= List of members of the Estonian Provincial Assembly =

This is a list of members of the Provincial Assembly of Estonia. On 12 April 1917, a decree issued by the Provisional Government in Russia created the autonomous Governorate of Estonia with its own Governor and a Provincial Assembly (or Council; Maanõukogu, but commonly known as the Maapäev) to be composed of elected members. The elections took place on 5 June 1917, and the Assembly convened on 14 July. On 28 November, it declared its laws sovereign over Estonia and moved to create a Constituent Assembly; once that was established and its members elected, the Provisional Assembly ceased to exist and its session ended on 23 April 1919.

== Officers ==
Source: Jaan Toomla, Valitud ja Valitsenud: Eesti parlamentaarsete ja muude esinduskogude ning valitsuste isikkoosseis aastail 1917–1999 (National Library of Estonia, 1999), p. 22.

=== Chairman ===
14 July 1917 – 25 October 1917: Artur Vallner

25 October 1917 – 27 November 1918: Otto Strandman

27 November 1918 – 3 February 1919: Ado Birk

3 February 1919 – 23 April 1919: Karl Parts

=== First Assistant Chairman ===
27 July 1917 – 25 October 1917: Jaan Teemant

25 October 1917 – 27 November 1918: Jüri Jaakson

27 November 1918 – 3 February 1919: Karl August Baars

3 February 1919 – 23 April 1919: Julius Seljamaa

=== Second Assistant Chairman ===
27 July 1917 – 25 October 1917: Jüri Vilms

25 October 1917 – 27 November 1918: Nikolai Köstner

27 November 1918 – 3 February 1919: Karl Saral

3 February 1919 – 23 April 1919: Peeter Põld

=== Temporary Secretary ===
14 July 1917 – 27 July 1917: Ado Birk

14 July 1917 – 27 July 1917: Julius Seljamaa

=== Secretary ===
27 July 1917 – 25 October 1917: Mart Kiirats

25 October 1917 – 16 February 1918: Herman Kask

27 November 1918 – 23 April 1919: Karl Ast

=== Second Assistant Secretary ===
27 July 1917 – 25 October 1917: Rudolf Jaska

25 October 1917 – 27 November 1918: Hugo Raudsepp

27 November 1918 – 3 February 1919: Victor Neggo

3 February 1919 – 23 April 1919: Jüri Parik

=== Second Assistant Secretary ===
27 July 1917 – 25 October 1917: Herman Kask

25 October 1917 – 27 November 1918: Victor Neggo

27 November 1918 – 23 April 1919: Hugo Raudsepp

== Members ==
Source: Jaan Toomla, Valitud ja Valitsenud: Eesti parlamentaarsete ja muude esinduskogude ning valitsuste isikkoosseis aastail 1917–1999 (National Library of Estonia, 1999), pp. 22–24.

Name	Notes
Juhan Mihkel Ainson	
Jaan Anvelt	Expelled on 5 February 1919
Alma Anvelt-Ostra (also Oinas)	From 20 November 1918, replacing Jaan Treial
Christjan Arro	
Karl Ast (also Rumor)	
Eduard Georg Aule	Left office on 20 November 1918; succeeded by Jüri Parik
Karl August Baars	
Ado Birk	
Max Woldemar Gustav Ed. Bock	
Aleksander Ennemuist	
Karl Theodor Grau	
Jüri Jaakson	
Juhan Januson (also Jaanuson)	
Rudolf Jaska	
Peet Johanson	
Juhan Kalm	
Eduard Kansman (also Kansmann or Kansa)	
Herman Kask	Died in office on 16 February 1918 and replaced by Mart Meos
Mart Kiirats	
August Kohver (also Koffer)	
Ivan Koort	
Hans Kruus	
Juhan Kukk	
Andres Kurrikoff	
Juhan Kurvits	
Timofei Kuusik	
Hugo Kuusner	Took office on 13 September 1917
Jaan Kärner	
Nikolai Köstner	
Juhan Lasn	
Tiido Laur (also Lauri)	
Anna Leetsmann	Expelled on 5 February 1919
Juhan Lehman (also Lehmann or Leeman)	Took office on 26 November 1918
Villem Maasik	
Mihkel Martna	Left office on 26 November 1918
Mart Meos	Took office on 27.11.1918, replacing Herman Kask
Friedrich Volrad Mikkelsaar	
Victor Neggo (also Neggu)	
Aleksander Oinas	Took office on 26 November 1918, replacing Hugo Karl Reiman
Aleksei Palm	
Jüri Parik	Took office on 26 November 1918, replacing Eduard Georg Aule
Karl Parts	
Anton Piip	
Aleksander Podrätšik	
Peeter Siegfried Põld	Took office on 26 November 1918
Konstantin Päts	
Hans Pöhl	
Hans Pöögelmann	Expelled on 5 February 1919
Jaan Raamot	
Hugo Raudsepp	
Hugo Karl Ferdinand Reiman	Left office on 26 November 1918; succeeded by Aleksander Oinas
Julius Eduard Reintam	
Hans Riiberg (also Riiberk)	
Hans Reinhold Roos	
Karl Saral	
Julius Seljamaa	
Jaan Sihver	Died on 28 November 1918; posthumously expelled on 5 February 1919
Otto August Strandman	
Jaan Teemant	
Jaan Treial	Died in office on 11 January 1918; succeeded by Alma Anvelt-Ostra
Jaan Tõnisson	
Artur Vallner (also Vainer)	Expelled on 5 February 1919
Aleksander Veiler	
Jüri Vilms	Died in office on 13 April 1918
Karl Johannes Virma	
Jaak Ümarik	
