= Juhan =

Male given name and family name

- Gender: Male
- Language: Estonian
- Name day: June 24 (Estonia)

Origin
- Region of origin: Estonia

Other names
- Related names: Johannes; Johan; Johann; Juhani; Hannes; Hans

Juhan (Estonian pronunciation: [ˈjuhɑn]) is a common Estonian male given name and occasionally a surname.

== Given name ==
- Juhan Aare (1948–2021), Estonian journalist and politician
- Juhan Aavik (1884–1982), Estonian composer
- Juhan Mihkel Ainson (1873–1962), Estonian politician
- Juhan af Grann (1944–2023, Heikki Juhani Grann), Finnish film director and producer
- Juhan Habicht (1954–2026), Estonian translator and writer
- Juhan Jaanuson (1894–1967), Estonian statistician and politician
- Juhan Jaik (1899–1948), Estonian writer and journalist
- Juhan Kahk (1928–1998), Estonian historian
- Juhan Kalm (1884–1953), Estonian agronomist and politician
- Juhan Kikas (1892–1944, also known as Jaan Kikkas), Estonian weightlifter
- Juhan Kivirähk (born 1957), Estonian sociologist
- Juhan Kreem (born 1971), Estonian historian, writer, and archivist
- Juhan Kukk (1885–1942), Estonian politician
- Juhan Kunder (1852–1888), Estonian writer
- Juhan Kurvits (1895–1939), Estonian politician
- Juhan Lasn (1861–1930), Estonian politician
- Juhan Leeman (1872-19??), Estonian politician and educator
- Juhan Leinberg (1812–1885), Estonian religious leader, also known as prophet Maltsvet
- Juhan Liiv (1864–1913), Estonian poet
- Juhan Luiga (1873–1927), Estonian psychiatrist, author, publicist, and politician
- Juhan Albert Luur (1883–1937), Estonian politician
- Juhan Maaker (1845–1930), Estonian folk musician
- Juhan Maiste (born 1952), Estonian art historian and professor
- Juhan Mettis (born 1990), Estonian judoka
- Juhan Muks (1899–1983), Estonian artist and painter
- Juhan Narma (1888–1942), Estonian politician
- Juhan Parts (born 1966), Estonian politician
- Juhan Peegel (1919–2007), Estonian journalist, linguist and writer
- Juhan Simm (1885–1959), Estonian composer, conductor and choral conductor
- Juhan Smuul (1922–1971), Estonian writer, until 1954 he used the given name Johannes Schmuul
- Juhan Sütiste (1899–1945), Estonian poet
- Juhan Tõrvand (1883–1942), Estonian military Major General
- Juhan Treisalt (1898–1980, better known as Ivan Triesault), Estonian-born American actor
- Juhan Ulfsak (born 1973), Estonian actor
- Juhan Uuemaa (1903–1942), Estonian politician and lawyer
- Juhan Viiding (1948–1995), Estonian poet and actor, also known under the pseudonym of Jüri Üdi

=== Surname ===
- Alexander Juhan (1765–1845), American violinist, composer and conductor
- Frank Juhan, (1887–1967), American football player
- Katherine Juhan-Arnold, American politician
