= Nikolai Köstner =

Estonian politician, economist, diplomat and academic

Nikolai Köstner (1889–1959) was an Estonian politician, economist, diplomat and academic. He was a member of the Provisional Assembly of the Autonomous Estonian Governorate (1917–19) and the Constituent Assembly of the newly established Republic of Estonia (1919–20); he also served as a minister in Jaan Raamot's Provincial Government (Estonian: Eesti Maavalitsus) in 1917, in the Second and Third Provisional Governments (1918–19), and in Otto Strandman's first Cabinet and Jaan Tõnisson's first Cabinet. He was also part of the Estonian delegation to the 1919 Paris Peace Conference. In later life, he worked as an academic at the University of Tartu and as an adviser to a number of national banks.

== Early life and education ==
Köstner was born on 26 March 1889 in Luunja Parish in Kreis Dorpat, Governorate of Livonia, the son of Jaak Kostner and Ann, née Jermakoff. He attended Tammistu Rural School (Vallakool) between 1896 and 1899, and then the Tartu Teachers' Seminar (1900–1901) and Tartu Reaalkool (Realschule) until 1907, when he began studying at the Moscow Commercial Institute, graduating in 1915. He worked in Moscow and St Petersburg before returning to Estonia in 1917.

== Government ==
In 1917, Köstner was elected to the Provincial Assembly of the Autonomous Governorate of Estonia; he served for the duration of its only session (1917–19) and was the assembly's Second Vice-Chairman between 25 October 1917 and 27 November 1918. In 1919, he was elected to the Constituent Assembly of the newly established Republic of Estonia as a member of the Estonian Social Democratic Workers' Party, but he stepped down on 3 February 1920, to be replaced by Johan Epner.

Köstner's parliamentary career ended there, but he also held a range of government offices. He was Head of the General Administration Department in the Provincial Government between 3 August and 25 October 1917, serving in Jaan Raamot's administration. He returned to government on 16 November 1918, when he was appointed Acting Minister of Commerce in the Second Provisional Government under Konstantin Päts; on 27 November 1918, he was made Minister of Industry and Trade in Päts's new administration (the Third Provisional Government), serving until 12 March 1919, when he was replaced by August Janson. In Otto Strandman's cabinet – the first of the Republic of Estonia – he served as Minister of Trade and Industry and Minister of Roads (Transport Minister), for the duration of the cabinet, from 8 May 1919 to 18 November 1919, when he was appointed Minister of Commerce and Industry in Jaan Tõnisson's first cabinet, serving until 15 April 1920.

== Academic, economic and diplomatic work, and later life ==
Outside of government, Köstner represented Estonia at the Paris Peace Conference in 1919, and was Estonian Representative and Consul in the United States between 1921 and 1922, when he was appointed an adviser to the Ministry of Finance, serving until 1927. He was an adviser of the Bank of Estonia between 1928 and 1932, held academic posts at the University of Tartu, serving as Assistant Professor of Statistics and Economic Geography from 1926, and then from 1932 to 1935 he was a Professor of Practical and Political Economy. Between 1932 and 1940, he was an adviser to the Bank of Bulgaria, and from 1941 held a similar post at the Bank of Egypt. He died in Cairo, Egypt, on 17 February 1959.

== See also ==
- Money doctor
