= Estonia electoral district =

Constituency for the 1917 Russian Constituent Assembly election

Estonia
- Former Civilian constituency for the All-Russian Constituent Assembly
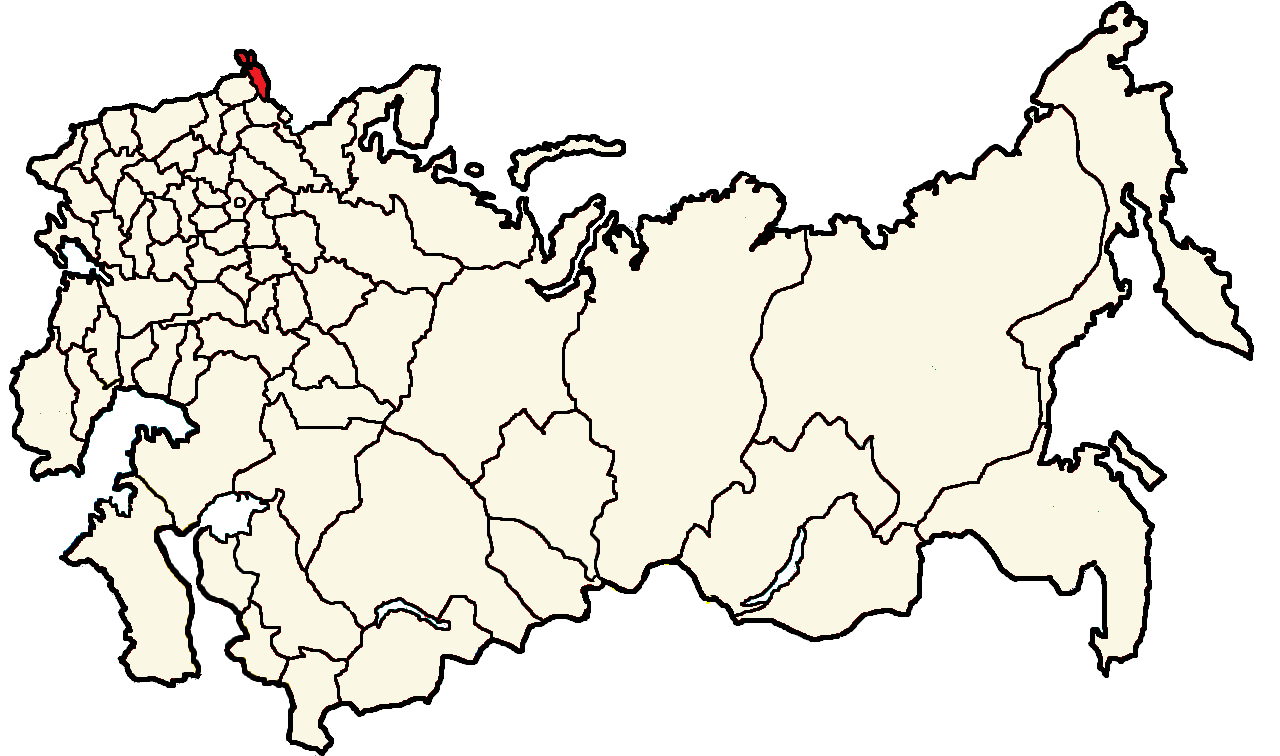

Former constituency
- Created: 1917
- Abolished: 1918
- Number of members: 8
- Number of Uyezd Electoral Commissions: 9
- Number of Urban Electoral Commissions: 2
- Number of Parishes: 349

The Estonia electoral district (Russian: Эстляндский избирательный округ) was a constituency created for the 1917 Russian Constituent Assembly election, covering the Autonomous Governorate of Estonia.

Voter turnout stood at 56.6% in the Estonia electoral district.

Notably, the Bolsheviks benefited from popular discontent with the failure of the Provisional Government to follow through on its promises of self-determination for Estonia. The Bolsheviks and Estonian Labour Party had their strongest support in Reval and northern Estonia. Bolsheviks obtained 22,003 votes (47.6%) in Reval, the Estonian Labour Party obtained 13,855 votes (29.9%), the Estonian Democratic Party 4,735 votes (10.2%), Estonian Social Democrats 2,689 votes (5.8%), Radical Democrats 1,136 votes (2.4%), Russian SRs 1,135 votes (2.4%) and Estonian SRs 787 votes (1.7%).

The Democratic Bloc obtained 53.4% of the votes in Tartu, and did also get a good number of votes in southern Estonia. In Tartu the Democratic Bloc got 8,441 votes, the Bolsheviks 5,394 votes, the Estonian SDs 1,226 votes, the Estonian SRs 349 votes, the Russian SRs 247 votes, the Estonian Labour Party 220 votes and the Radical Democrats 143 votes.

In Rakvere the Estonian Labour Party obtained 1,186 votes, the Bolsheviks 861 votes, the Estonian Democratic Bloc 543 votes, Estonian SDs 86 votes, the Estonian SRs 40 votes, Estonian Radical Democratic Party 29 votes and Russian SRs 27 votes. There was 57% voter participation in Rakvere.

In Fellin the Bolsheviks got 1,332 votes, the Estonian Labour Party 1,283 votes, the Democratic Bloc 983 votes, Estonian SRs 156 votes, the Estonian SDs 111 votes, the Radical Democrats 31 votes and the Russian SRs 8 votes.

Soldiers stationed at garrisons in Estonia did not vote in the Estonian district, but in the Baltic Fleet constituency.

== Results ==
Estonia
Party	Vote	%	Seats	%
List 2 - Bolsheviks	119,863	39.98	4	50.00
List 7 - Estonian Democratic Bloc (Estonian Democratic Party and Estonian Land Union)	68,085	22.71	2	25.00
List 3 - Estonian Labour Party	64,704	21.58	2	25.00
List 1 - Estonian SRs	17,726	5.91		
List 6 - Estonian Radical Democratic Party and Peasants Union	17,022	5.68		
List 4 - Estonian SDs	9,244	3.08		
List 5 - Socialist-Revolutionaries	3,200	1.07		
Total:	299,844		8	

Deputies Elected
Anvelt	Bolshevik
Pöögelmann	Bolshevik
Rabchinsky	Bolshevik
Vakmann	Bolshevik
Seljamaa	Estonian Labour
Vilms	Estonian Labour
Poska	Estonian Democratic
Tõnisson	Estonian Democratic

== Electoral propaganda ==
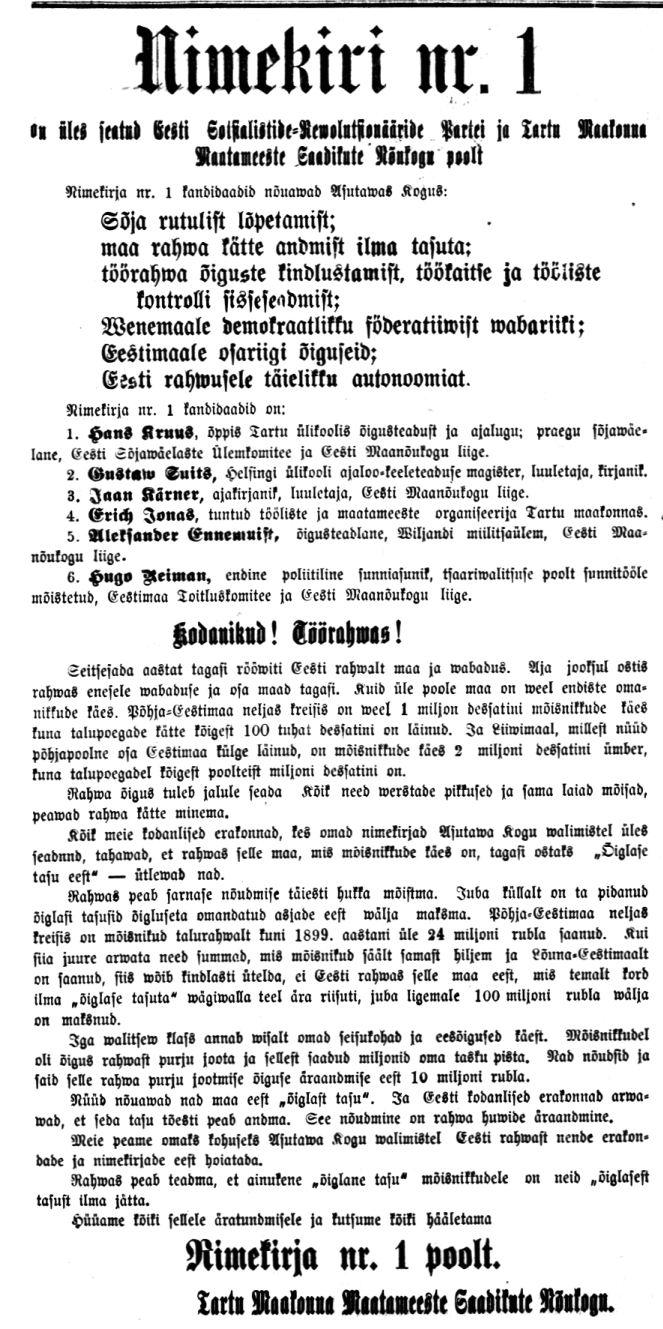
Communique issued by the Tartu Soviet of Peasants Deputies, calling for a vote for List 1 (Estonian SRs)

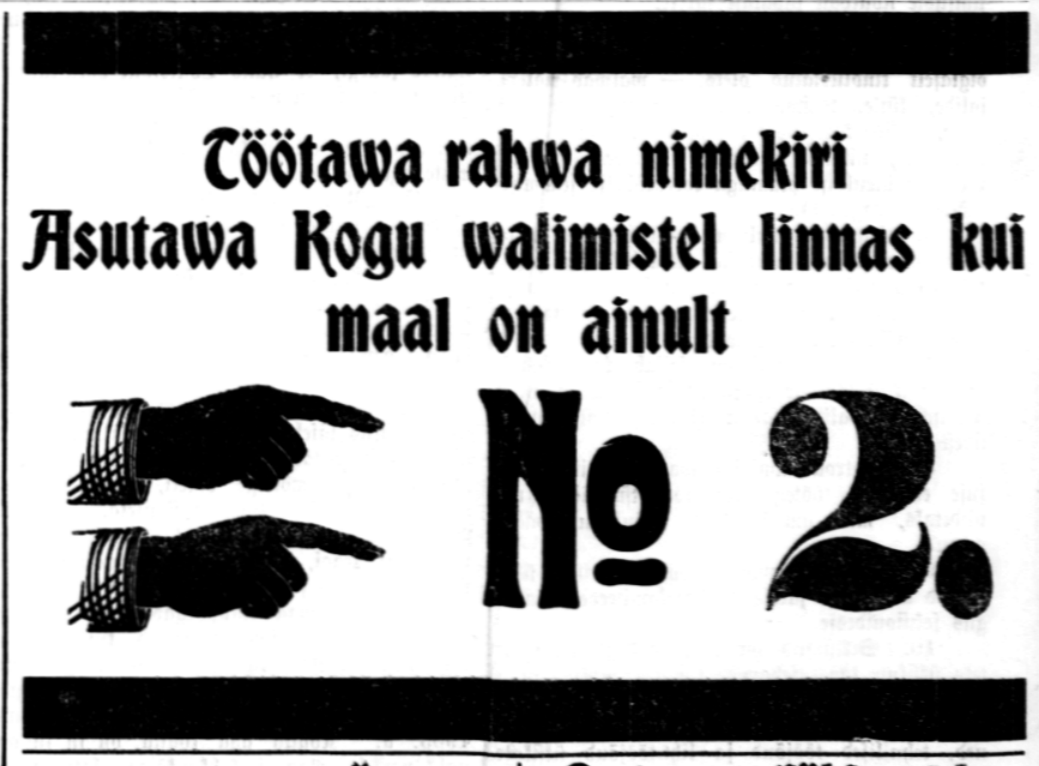
Advert for List 2 (Bolsheviks) in Tartu Tööliste ja Soldatite Saadikute Nõukogu Teataja

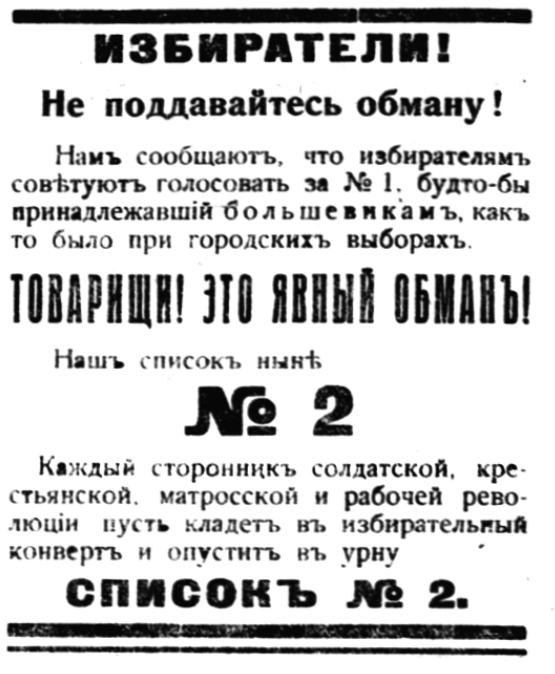
Advert in the newspaper Zvezda for List 2 (Bolsheviks)

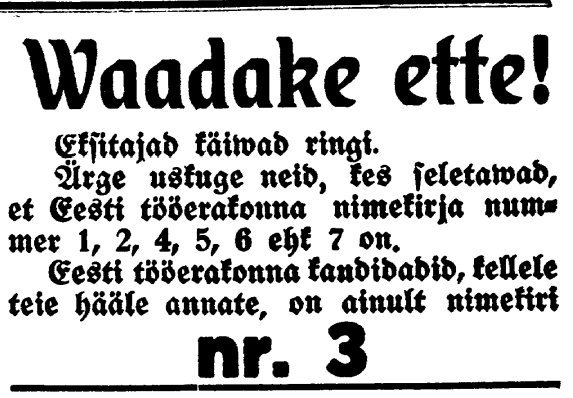
Advert in the newspaper Uus Päewaleht for List 3 (Estonian Labour Party)

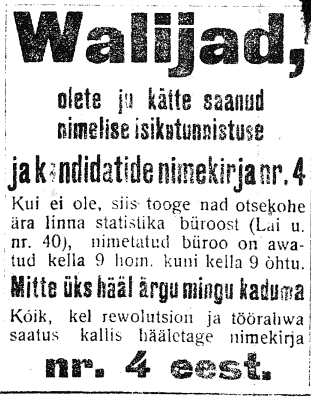
Advert for List 4 (Estonian SDs) in the newspaper Sotsialdemokrat

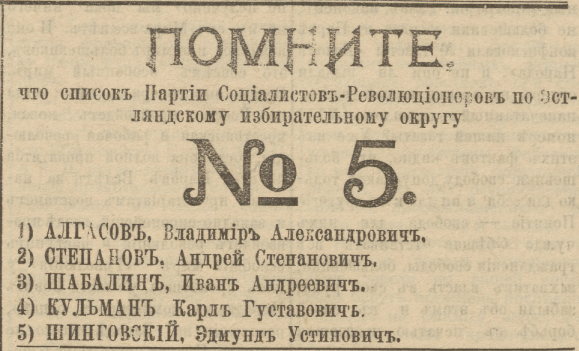
Advert in the newspaper Golos Naroda for List 5 (Socialist-Revolutionaries). The list was headed by Vladimir Algasov

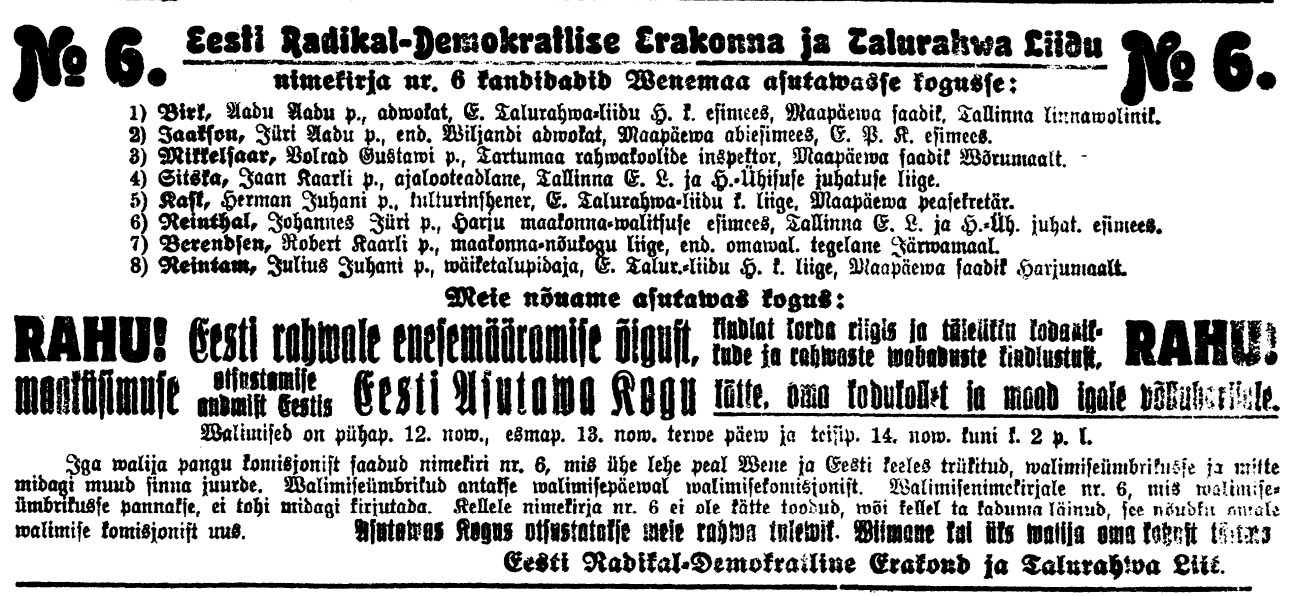
Advert for List 6 (Estonian Radical Democratic Party and Peasants Union) in Teataja

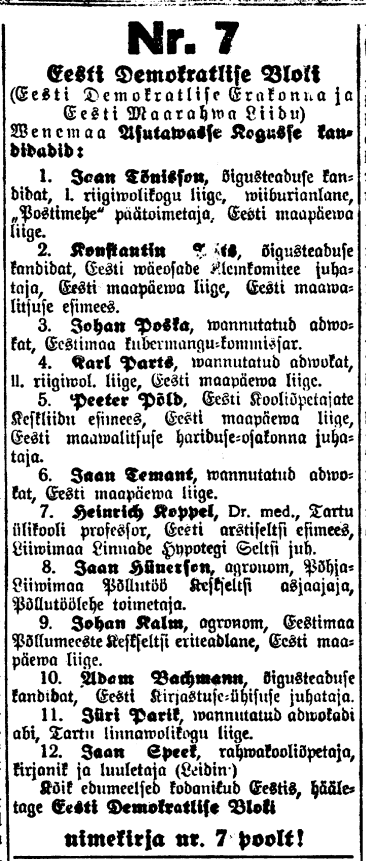
Advert in the newspaper Postimees for List 7 (Estonian Democratic Bloc)

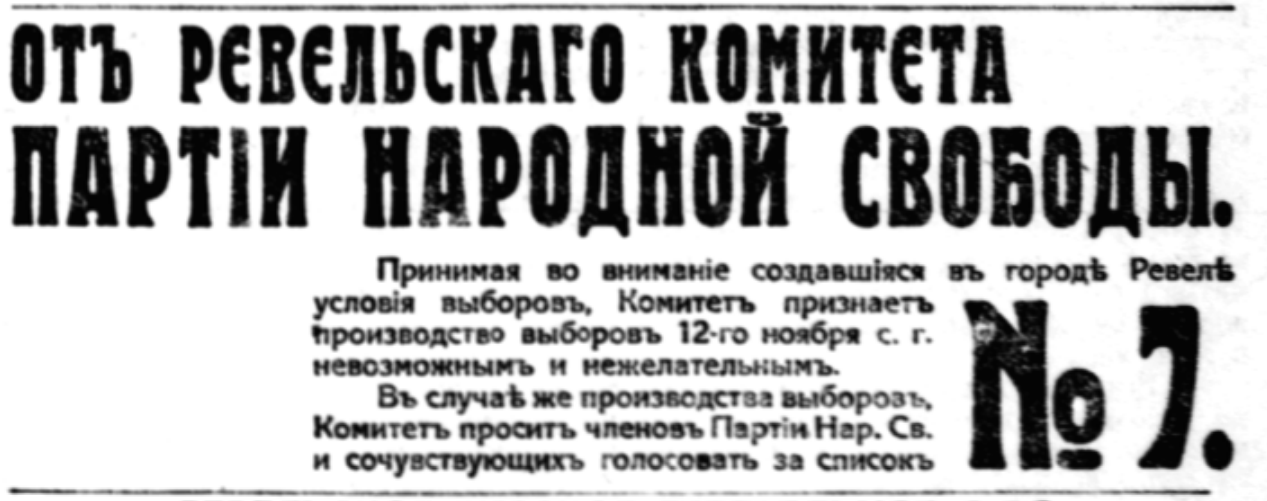
Advert issued by the Reval Committee of the People's Freedom Party (Kadet Party) in the newspaper Revelskoye Slovo, calling on voters to cast their votes for List 7 (Estonian Democratic Bloc)

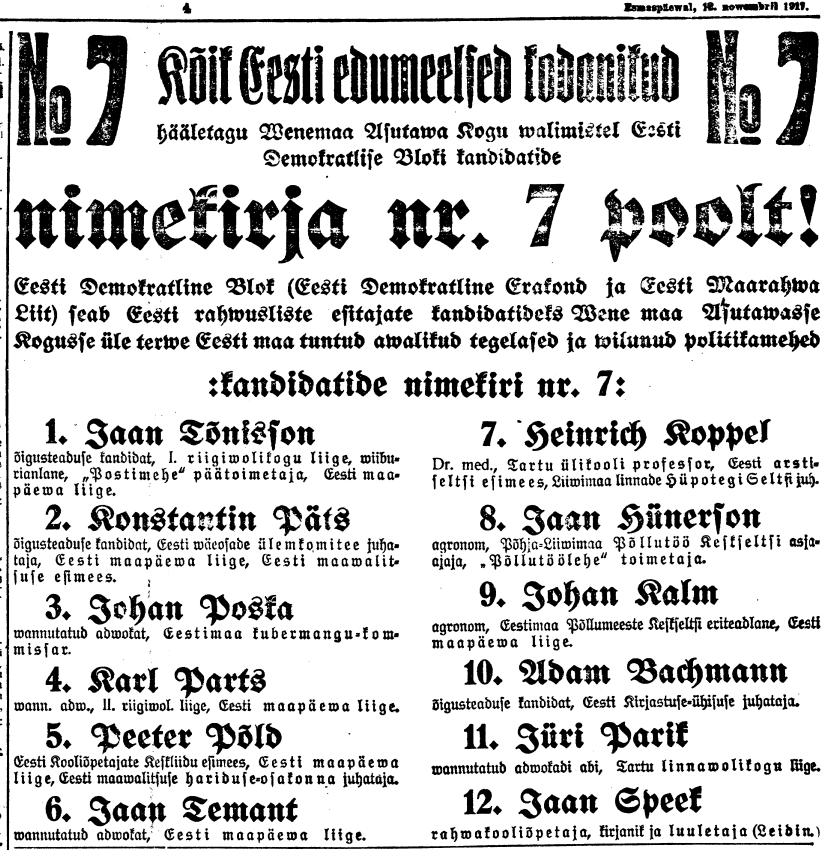
Advert in the newspaper Postimees for List 7 (Estonian Democratic Bloc)
