= Ado Birk's cabinet =

Government of Estonia from 28 July 1920 to 30 July 1920

Ado Birk's cabinet was in office in Estonia from 28 July 1920 to 30 July 1920, when it was succeeded by Jaan Tõnisson's second cabinet.

== Members ==
This cabinet's members were the following:

Name	Portrait	Position
Ado Birk		Prime Minister
Karl Einbund		Minister of the Interior
Karl Pusta		Minister of Foreign Affairs
Theodor Pool		Minister of Agricultural Affairs
Aleksander Bürger		Minister of Roads
Jüri Jaakson		Minister of Court
Adam Bachmann		Minister of Labor and Welfare
Viktor Pihlak		Minister of Commerce and Industry
Aleksander Tõnisson		Minister of War
Tõnis Vares		Minister of Finance
Gustav Viard		Minister of Nutrition
Nikolai Kann		Minister of Education
