= Raamot =

Raamot is an Estonian surname. Notable people with the surname include:

- Jaan Raamot (1873–1927), Estonian politician
- Mari Raamot (1872–1966), Estonian activist
