= Anna Leetsmann =

Estonian communist politician

Anna Henriette Leetsmann (12 October 1888 – 5 March 1942) was an Estonian Bolshevik activist, politician, educator and historian. She was the only woman elected to the Provincial Assembly of the Autonomous Governorate of Estonia in 1917, although she was expelled from the chamber in February 1919 after her Bolshevik activism during the period when Estonian communists, sponsored by the Soviet Union, de facto governed parts of Estonia. By that time, she had already lived in the Soviet Russia since the German occupation of Estonia in February 1918; the rest of her life was spent teaching, studying and working for the party in the USSR. She was detained by the Soviet authorities twice for (allegedly) being a Trotskyist; she died during the second period of incarceration.

== Early life and education ==
Leetsmann was born on 12 October 1888 in Kalvi, Viru County, the daughter of a schoolmaster; she was brought up speaking German and studied at her father's village school in Rannu. She then attended the Zeeh Girls' School in Rakvere, graduating in 1904, and the Rakvere City School, completing her exams. She then taught at the Aseri Cement Factory's school and in 1911 began studying at St Petersburg University.

== Career ==
=== Communist politics and the Provincial Assembly ===
In 1917, Leetsmann joined the Russian Social Democratic Labour Party (Bolsheviks) and became secretary of the party's Aseri branch. She served on the supervisory board of Viru County, and was elected to the Provincial Assembly of the newly-established Autonomous Governorate of Estonia. She tended to vote with the socialist faction of the Assembly and was the first woman elected to the Assembly and the only one until Alma Ostra-Oinas joined in November 1918. In December 1917, the Bolshevik Jaan Anvelt and his party seized de facto power in Tallinn and other parts of Estonia and, sponsored by the new Russian Council of People's Commissars, declared the Provincial Assembly dissolved. Leetsmann endorsed the call and travelled to Aseri to establish a revolutionary committee and organise the cement factory's brigade of Red Riflemen (Punakaart). She was elected, in December 1917, secretary of the Soviet of Workers and Soldiers (Tööliste ja Soldatite Saadikute Nõukogu) and appointed the Revolutionary Commissar of Viru County.

The Imperial Germany Army expelled the communists in February 1918 and Leetsmann retreated to Soviet Russia to teach and work for her party; in the meantime, Germany withdrew from the Baltic lands after losing the First World War, prompting the Soviets to reoccupy the territory despite the Estonian Provisional Government declaring its independence. Once the resulting Estonian War of Independence had forced the Soviet Red Army out of Estonia by February 1919, the Provincial Assembly moved to establish its first Constitution. Its members also expelled Leetsmann, on 5 February, and she took no further part in Estonian politics.

=== Life in the Soviet Union, teaching and captivity ===
Leetsmann never returned to Estonia. In 1923, she became head of the Estonian division of Communist University of the National Minorities of the West and lectured on the communist party's history. After studying at the Leningrad Institute of History and Research (1930–32), she taught at the MN Pokrovski Pedagogical Institute and served as deputy director. Two years later, she was appointed to a position in the Education Department in Leningrad (now Saint Petersburg). After Sergey Kirov's assassination in December 1934, she left the city and the following year became Head of the Education Department in the Dubrovnik District of Tobolsky District in the Omsk Oblast. The next year, she was arrested and accused of harbouring Trotskyist sympathies; expelled from the party, she was released but later rearrested and died while detained, on 5 March 1942.
