= Eduard Aule =

Estonian politician (1878–1947)

Eduard Georg Aule (28 December 1878 – 7 March 1947) was an Estonian banker and politician.

Born in the Kabala manor (now part Türi Parish) in Kreis Fellin of the Governorate of Livonia on 28 December 1878 (16 December OS), Aule attended Tartu Reaalkool and studied commerce at Riga Polytechnical Institute.

He later worked as a banker.

He was elected to the Estonian Provincial Assembly, which governed the Autonomous Governorate of Estonia between 1917 and 1919; he served until 20 November 1918, when he stepped down and was replaced by Jüri Parik. He was also elected to the Asutav Kogu (Constituent Assembly) as a member for the Estonian Rural People's Union (Estonian: Eesti Maarahva Liit; EMRL) party (later renamed Farmers' Assemblies), but stepped down on 23 April 1919, and was replaced by Jaan Raamot. In the meantime, Aule briefly served as Minister of Food, between 6 February 1919 and 9 May 1919.

Aule was President of the Bank of Estonia between 1921 and 1925 and sat on the board of other banks. Between 1923 and 1940, he was treasurer of the Estonian Olympic Committee, and in 1941 moved to Germany before returning to Tallinn to serve in the municipality's Economic and Finance Directorate between 1942 and 1944. He left Estonia that year, and died on 7 March 1947 in Goslar in the British Zone of Allied-occupied Germany.
