= Villem Maasik =

Estonian lawyer and politician

Villem Maasik (1883–1919) was an Estonian lawyer, trade unionist and politician.

Maasik was born in 1883 in Vastseliina, Võru County. He was elected to the Provincial Assembly of the newly established Autonomous Governorate of Estonia, which sat between 14 July 1917 and 23 April 1919. During this time, he also sat in government; he was Head of the Labour Department from its inception on 2 August 1917, serving for the duration of Jaan Raamot's period as Chairman of the Provincial Government (Estonian: Eesti Ajutine Maavalitsus). When Konstantin Päts replaced Raamot on 25 October, he kept Maasik in his office, which he renamed "Head of the Labour and Welfare Department". On 24 February 1918, Maasik was then appointed Minister of Labour and Welfare in the first Provisional Government, again under Päts. In practice, the Germans occupied Estonia in late February 1918, forcing the government underground. After the German defeat in the First World War, Päts' second government took office on 12 November 1918, but Maasik was not among them and did not return to government. He was executed on 3 September 1919 in Izborsk.
