= Konstantin Päts's first provisional cabinet =

Government of Estonia from February 1918 to November 1918

Konstantin Päts's first provisional cabinet was in office in Estonia from 24 February 1918 to 12 November 1918, when it was succeeded by Konstantin Päts's second provisional cabinet.
