= Jüri Parik =

Estonian lawyer and politician

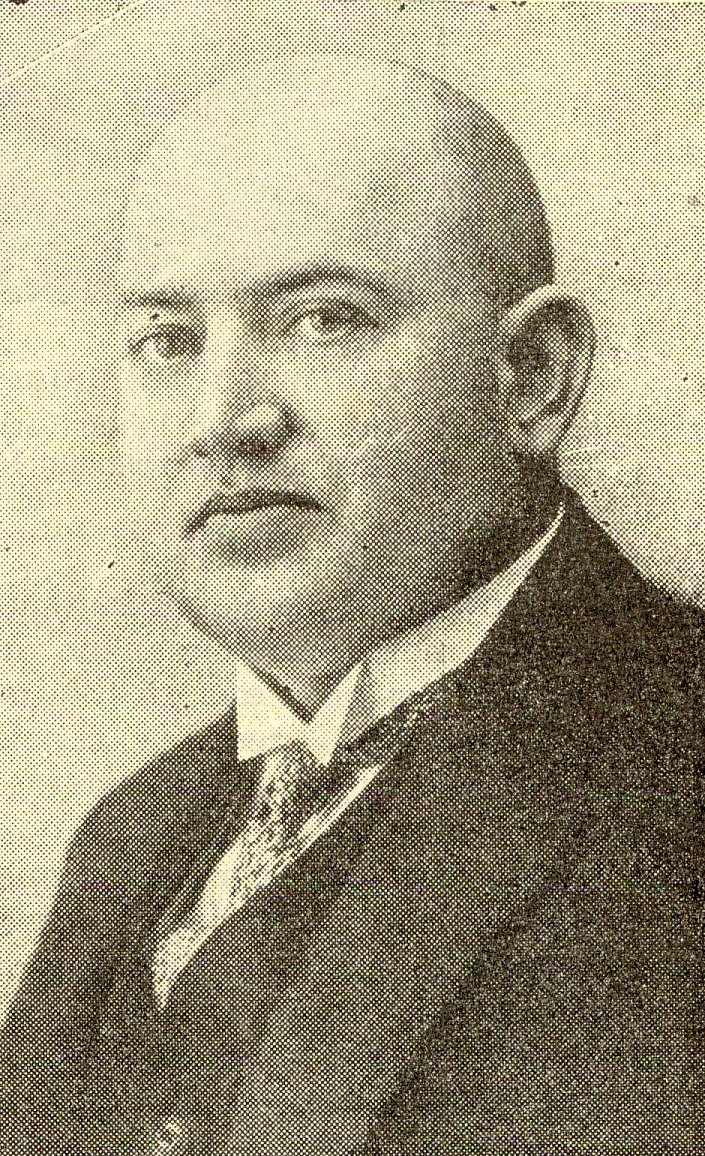
Jüri Parik

Jüri Parik (1889–1929) was an Estonian lawyer and politician.

Born on 16 April 1889 in Uue-Võidu Parish (now Viljandi Parish) in Kreis Fellin of the Governorate of Livonia, Parik was a member of the Estonian Provincial Assembly which governed the Autonomous Governorate of Estonia between 1917 and 1919. He joined the assembly on 26 November 1918, replacing Eduard Aule who had resigned. He served until the end of the session and was the First Assistant Secretary to the Assembly between 3 February 1919 and 23 April 1919. Parik did not participate in the independent Republic of Estonia's Asutav Kogu (Constitutional Assembly) which followed, but he was elected to the first session of the Riigikogu (Estonian Parliament) as a representative of the Farmers' Assemblies party. He served for the duration of the session, which ended in 1923.

Parik died on 21 May 1929 in Tallinn.
