= Aleksander Ennemuist =

Estonian politician, lawyer

Aleksander Ennemuist (23 January, 1899– 12 April, 1975) was an Estonian lawyer, educator and politician.

Ennemuist was born on 23 January 1899 in Lõve (now Tõrva Parish) in Kreis Fellin, Governorate of Livonia and practiced as a lawyer. He was elected to the Estonian Provincial Assembly, which governed the Autonomous Governorate of Estonia between 1917 and 1919; he served for the whole term, but did not sit in the newly formed Republic of Estonia's Asutav Kogu (Constituent Assembly) or the Riigikogu. He died on 12 April 1975 in Kehra.
