= Estonian Provincial Government =

Government of Estonia from 1917 to 1918

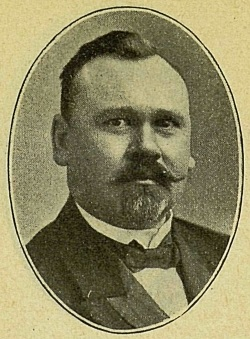
Jaan Raamot, first chairman of the Estonian Provincial Government (1917)

The Estonian Provincial Government (Estonian: Eesti Ajutine Maavalitsus) was the provincial government of the Autonomous Governorate of Estonia, still under the formal sovereignty of the post-tsarist Russia. It was the executive body of the Estonian Provincial Assembly. The provincial government was in office from 2 August 1917 to 24 February 1918, when it was succeeded by the Provisional Government of the newly proclaimed Republic of Estonia. The provincial government was headed by Jaan Raamot (2 August to 25 October 1917) and Konstantin Päts (25 October 1917 – 24 February 1918).

== Sources ==
- Baumgart, Winfried (1966). Deutsche Ostpolitik 1918: Von Brest-Litovsk bis zum Ende des Ersten Weltkrieges. Wien: Oldenbourg.
- Hiden, John (1987). The Baltic States and Weimar Ostpolitik. Cambridge: Cambridge University Press.
- Kuldkepp, Mart (2021). "The political choices and outlooks of the Estonian Swedish national minority, 1917-1920" (PDF). National Identities. 23 (4): 409–431.
- Materski, Wojciech (2020). "The Problem of the Demarcation of the Border between Estonia and Russia in 1917-1920" (PDF). Zapiski Historyczne. 85 (4): 89–110. Archived from the original on 2025-12-14.
- O'Connor, Kevin (2003). The History of the Baltic States. Westport: Greenwood Press.
- Rauch, Georg (1974). The Baltic States: The Years of Independence: Estonia, Latvia, Lithuania, 1917-1940. London: Hurst.
- Stone, Norman (1998) [1975]. The Eastern Front, 1914–1917. New York: Penguin Books.
- Sukiennicki, Wiktor (1984). East Central Europe During World War I: From Foreign Domination to National Independence. Boulder: East European Monographs.
