= Märt Meos =

Estonian educator and politician

Märt Meos (16 January 1881 – 1 March 1966), was an Estonian educator and politician.

== Career ==
Meos was born on 16 January 1881 in Tarvastu, Viljandi County; he was the son of Märt Meos, a farm-owner, and his wife Anu, née Raudjalg. He studied in Tarvastu-Kuresaar rural school and Tarvastu parish school before studying at the Tartu Teachers' Seminar. After graduating in 1901, he taught at Vana-Lõve ministry school (1901–02), and then the Kärstna ministry school, where he was headteacher (1902–07). He was also head of the Väike-Maarja parish school from 1907 to 1919, when he became the Viru County school counselor (koolinõunik).

Meos was also active in politics. He joined the Provincial Assembly of the Autonomous Governorate of Estonia on 27 November 1918, replacing Herman Kask. He served for the duration of the term, which last until 23 April 1919. He did not sit in the national legislature again, but he was an important figure in the reforms to Viru County's education system after Estonian independence.

He continued to work as the county's school counsellor until 1944, when he retired (by that time, the position had been renamed school inspector, or koolide inspektor, following the Soviet model). He then taught Russian at Väike-Maarja High School but in the 1950s his house in Väike-Maarja was nationalised by the Estonian SSR and he was removed from his teaching post; he managed to regain the right to live in his house, and was restored in his post, but retired in 1957. He moved to Viljandi in 1960 and died on 1 March 1966.

== Bibliography ==
Meos authored the following works:

- Avaldanud brogüüri Meie kool (1922),
- Kuidas õpetada lugema ja kirjutama (1925),
- Kooliaed (1928)
- Vaatlusi ja harjutusi õigekirja õppimiseks:
  - Ja II (1929),
  - III ja IV (1930),
  - Ja VI (1931)
