= Herman Kask =

Estonian politician and surveyor

Herman Kask (died 1918), also known as Hermann Kask, was an Estonian surveyor and politician.

Kask was elected to the Estonian Provincial Assembly, which governed the Autonomous Governorate of Estonia between 1917 and 1919; he was the Assembly's Second Assistant Secretary between 27 July 1917 and 25 October 17, when he was appointed full Secretary. He served until his death on 16 February 1918; his seat in the Assembly was taken up by Mart Meos on 27 November 1918.
