= Aleksei Palm =

Estonian educator and politician

Aleksei Palm (10 February 1887 – 12 February 1942), also known as Ado Palm, was an Estonian educator and politician.

Palm was born on 10 February 1887 in Velise in Wiek County. In 1917, he was elected to sit on the Estonian Provincial Assembly, the national diet of the Autonomous Governorate of Estonia in the Russian Empire. He served for the duration of the session, which ended in 1919, but did not sit on the Estonian Constituent Assembly or the Estonian Parliament which followed.

Palm died on 12 February 1942 aged 55 in Nizhny Baskunchak in the Astrakhan Oblast of the Soviet Union.
