= Karl Theodor Grau =

Estonian politician

Karl Theodor Grau (1884–1952) was an Estonian lawyer and politician.

Grau was born on 31 October 1884 in Soosaare Parish (now Viljandi Parish) in Kreis Fellin and practised as a lawyer. He was elected to the Estonian Provincial Assembly, which governed the Autonomous Governorate of Estonia between 1917 and 1919; he served for the whole term, but did not sit in the newly formed Republic of Estonia's Asutav Kogu (Constituent Assembly) or the Riigikogu. He died on 18 August 1952 in Augsburg, West Germany.
