= Democratic Bloc (Estonia) =

Political party in Estonia

The Democratic Bloc (Estonian: Demokraatlik Blokk) was a political grouping in Estonia.

== History ==
The Bloc was formed in 1917 by the Estonian Democratic Party, the Estonian Radical Democratic Party and the Rural League. Between them the parties had won 24 of the 62 seats in the Provincial Assembly elections in the same year.

In the Russia-wide elections in November 1917, the Democratic Bloc received around 23% of the vote in the Autonomous Governorate of Estonia. In the Estonian Constituent Assembly elections the following year, the Bloc maintained its vote share at around 23%.

In March 1919 the Estonian Democratic Party and Estonian Radical Democratic Party merged to form the Estonian People's Party, with the Rural League remaining a separate party.
