= Vallner =

Vallner is an Estonian surname. Notable people with the surname include:

- Artur Vallner (1887–1939), Estonian educator and politician
- Karl Andre Vallner (born 1998), Estonian footballer
- Siiri Vallner (born 1972), Estonian architect
