= Andres Kurrikoff =

Estonian farmer and politician

Andres Kurrikoff (1863–1925) was an Estonian farmer and politician.

Kurrikoff was born on 29 October 1863 in Pärsti, a village in Viljandi County. He was elected to the Estonian Provincial Assembly, which governed the Autonomous Governorate of Estonia between 1917 and 1919; he served the full term. He did not sit in the newly formed Republic of Estonia's Asutav Kogu (Constituent Assembly) or its Riigikogu (Parliament). He died on 13 August 1925 in Pärsti.
