= Rudolf Jaska =

Estonian lawyer and politician

Rudolf Jaska (1891–1974) was an Estonian lawyer and politician.

Jaska was born on 5 December 1891 in Mäksa in Tartu County and practised as a lawyer. He was elected to the Estonian Provincial Assembly, which governed the Autonomous Governorate of Estonia between 1917 and 1919; he served for the whole term and was its first assistant secretary between 27 July and 25 October 1917, but did not sit in the newly formed Republic of Estonia's Asutav Kogu (Constituent Assembly) or the Riigikogu. He died on 22 April 1974 in Tartu.
