= Pihlak =

Family name

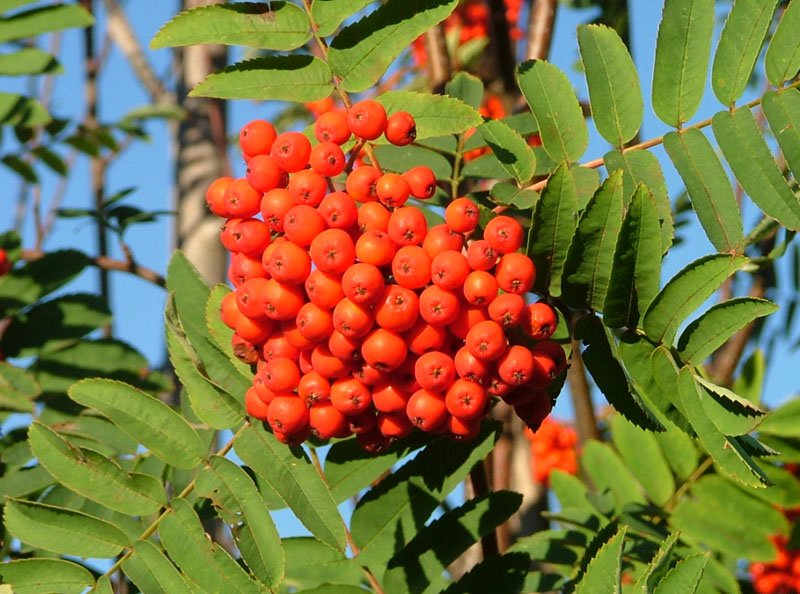

Origin
- Language: Estonian
- Meaning: rowan
- Region of origin: Estonia

Other names
- Variant forms: Pihlakas given name Finnish: Pihla

Pihlak is an Estonian surname meaning rowan (more common form is Pihlakas).

People bearing the surname Pihlak include:

- Arnold Pihlak (1902–1982), football player
- Eduard Pihlak (1888–1944), physician and military commander
- Helle Meri (née Pihlak; born 1949), actress and the First Lady
- Oskar Pihlak (1901–1968), physician (:et)
- Viktor Pihlak (1886–1942), architect and industrialist
