= Hugo Kuusner =

Estonian jurist and politician

Hugo Jakob Kuusner (19 March 1887 – 23 March 1942) was an Estonian jurist and politician.

Kuusik was born on 19 March 1887 in Pärnu. A jurist, he sat in the Estonian Provincial Assembly, which governed the Autonomous Governorate of Estonia, between 13 September 1917 and the end of the session on 23 April 1919. He was also elected to newly formed Republic of Estonia's Asutav Kogu (Constituent Assembly), and served for the full session (1919–20) as a member of the Estonian People's Party. Kuusner also served in the Estonian Defence League. During the Second World War, Kussner was arrested by the occupying Soviet authorities (on 14 June 1941) and deported to Tavda in the Sverdlovsk Oblast, where he died on 23 March 1942 aged 55.
