= Aleksander Podrätšik =

Estonian historian and politician

Aleksander Podrätšik (1888–1921), also spelt Aleksander Podrätshik, was an Estonian teacher, historian and politician.

Born on 4 May 1888 in Konguta in Tartu County, Podrätšik was a member of the Estonian Provincial Assembly which governed the Autonomous Governorate of Estonia between 1917 and 1919. He sat for the duration of the assembly, which was from 14 July 1917 until 23 April 1919, after which Estonia became a sovereign nation; thereafter, Podrätšik did not sit on the Asutav Kogu (the Constitutional Assembly) or independent Estonia's new parliament, the Riigikogu. He died on 8 February 1921 in Pärnu.
