= Christian Arro =

Estonian politician (1885–1942)

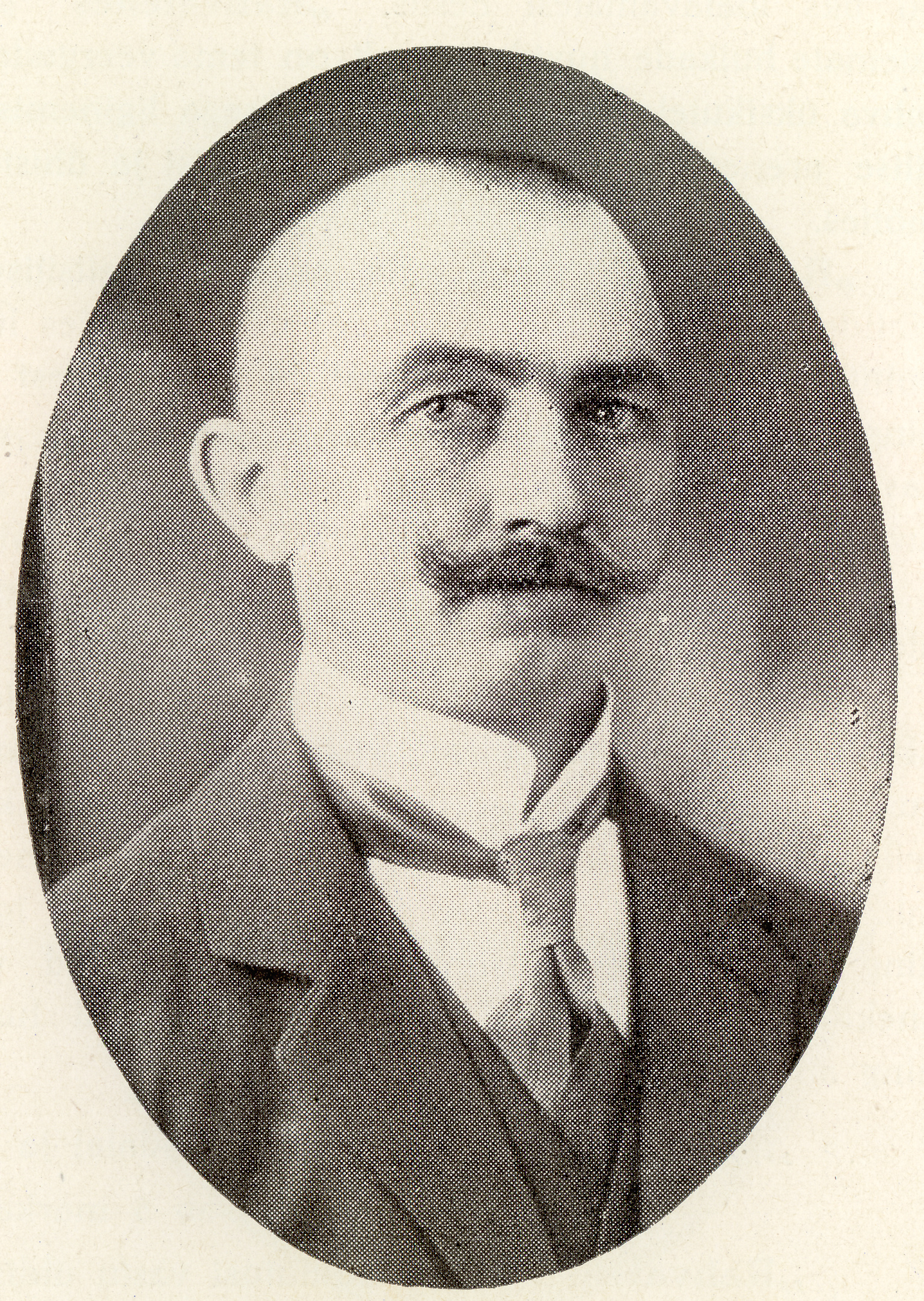
- Born: 25 January 1885; Polli, Governorate of Livonia, Russian Empire
- Died: 21 April 1942 (aged 57); Sverdlovsk, Russian Soviet Federative Socialist Republic, Soviet Union
- Occupations: politician, farmer

Christian Arro (also known as Christjan Arro and Kristjan Arro; 25 January 1885 – 21 April 1942) was an Estonian agriculturist, farmer and politician.

Born in the village of Polli on 25 January 1885, Arro was an agriculturist and farmer. He was also active in politics, and sat on the Estonian Provincial Assembly (which governed the Autonomous Governorate of Estonia) for the entirety of its only session (1917–19). He did not sit on the Constituent Assembly, but was elected to the first and second legislatures of the Riigikogu in 1920 and 1923, respectively. He resigned from the second legislature on 7 November 1924, and was replaced by Hans Mitt. Throughout his time in the chamber, he sat as a member of the Farmers' Assemblies party.

During the Soviet occupation of Estonia during the Second World War, Arro was deported to Sverdlovsk (now Yekaterinburg) in the Soviet Union, where he was executed on 21 April 1942.
