= Koort =

Family name

Origin
- Language: Estonian
- Meaning: "cord"
- Region of origin: Estonia

Koort is an Estonian language surname meaning "cord". As of 1 January 2021, 272 men and 305 in Estonia have the surname Koort. Koort is ranked as the 168th most common surname for men in Estonia, and 167th for women. The surname Koort is most common in Viljandi County, where 11.75 per 10,000 inhabitants of the county bear the surname.

Notable people bearing the surname Koort include:

- Alfred Koort (1901–1956), philosopher
- Andres Koort (born 1969), painter, scenographer, exhibit designer and curator
- Heikki Koort (1955–2021), diplomat, sports figure and actor
- Jaan Koort (1883–1935), sculptor, painter and ceramicist
- Joann Koort (aka Ivan Koort and Johann Koort; 1871–1931), merchant and politician
