= Lasn =

Family name

Lasn is an Estonian surname. Notable people with the surname include:

- Juhan Lasn (1861–1930), Estonian politician
- Kalle Lasn (born 1942), Estonian-Canadian film maker, author, magazine editor, and activist
