= Tiido Laur =

Estonian politician and archivist

Tiido Laur (1882–1930), also known as Tiido Lauri, was an Estonian politician and archivist.

Laur was born on 31 August 1882 in Kohtla, Viru County. He sat in the Estonian Provincial Assembly, which governed the Autonomous Governorate of Estonia; he served in the full session which sat between 14 July 1917 and 23 April 1919. He did not sit in the newly-formed Republic of Estonia's Asutav Kogu (Constituent Assembly) or Riigikogu (Parliament). Laur died on 1 August 1930 in Tallinn.
