= Estonian Radical Socialist Party =

Estonian political party

The Estonian Radical Socialist Party (Estonian: Eesti Radikaalsotsialistlik Partei, ERSP) was a political party in Estonia.

== History ==
The party was founded on 6 May 1917 in Tallinn in order to contest the Estonian Provincial Assembly elections that year. Its initial leaders were Jüri Vilms and Eduard Laaman. The party co-operated closely with the Social Travaillist Party and the two became known as the "Labourites".

The Labourites won 11 of the 62 seats in the Assembly elections, becoming the second-largest faction after the Rural League, and went on to finish second in the 1918 Constituent Assembly elections.

In 1919 the two parties merged to form the Estonian Labour Party.

== Ideology ==
The Radical Socialist Party was founded as a clearly left-wing party, that supported social equality, democracy, but also liberal economic policies, and had a similar programme to the Russian Trudoviks. Its voters came from the poorer classes and therefore it had a radical approach to the land reform and advocated the separation of church and state and a democratic constitution, which would give more power to the parliament.
