= Jaan Tõnisson's second cabinet =

Government of Estonia from July 1920 to October 1920

Jaan Tõnisson's second cabinet was in office in Estonia from 30 July 1920 to 26 October 1920, when it was succeeded by Ants Piip's cabinet.

== Members ==
This cabinet's members were the following:

Name	Portrait	Position
Jaan Tõnisson		Prime Minister
Karl Einbund		Minister of the Interior
Ado Birk		Minister of Foreign Affairs
August Kerem		Minister of Agricultural Affairs
Aleksander Bürger		Minister of Roads
Jüri Jaakson		Minister of Justice
Friedrich Sauer		Minister of Education
