= Estonian Democratic Party =

Estonian political party

The Estonian Democratic Party (Estonian: Eesti Demokraatlik Erakond, EDE) was a political party in Estonia.

== History ==
The party had its roots in the Estonian national movement towards the end of the 19th century. It was formally founded by Jaan Tõnisson in the city of Tartu in 1905 as the Progressive National Democratic Party (Eesti Rahvameelne Eduerakond). Tönisson represented the party in the Russian Duma, where the party was affiliated with the Constitutional Democratic Party.

In 1917 the party was renamed the "Democratic Party". It won seven seats in the Provincial Assembly elections in the same year, and became part of the Democratic Bloc in the Assembly alongside the Estonian Radical Democratic Party and the Rural League. The three contested the 1918 elections as the Democratic Bloc, receiving around 23% of the vote.

In March 1919 the party merged with the Radical Democratic Party to form the Estonian People's Party, with the new party going on to win 25 of the 120 seats in the Constituent Assembly elections in April. Some party members unhappy with the merger left to help form the Christian Democratic Party.
