= Jaak Ümarik =

Estonian politician

Jaak Ümarik (18 January 1891 Tuhalaane Parish, Viljandi County – 4 November 1981 Tallinn) was an Estonian politician. He was a member of Estonian Provincial Assembly.
