= Joann Koort =

Estonian merchant and politician

Joann Koort (1871–1931), also known as Ivan Koort or Johann Koort, was an Estonian merchant and politician.

== Early life ==
Koort was born in 1871 in Leisi, a village in Saaremaa.

== Career ==
Koort was elected to the Estonian Provincial Assembly, which governed the Autonomous Governorate of Estonia between 1917 and 1919; he served the full term. He did not sit in the newly formed Republic of Estonia's Asutav Kogu (Constituent Assembly) or its Riigikogu (Parliament). He died on 8 June 1931 in Leisi.
