= Juhan Kurvits =

Estonian politician (1895–1953)

Juhan Kurvits (13 January 1895 – 28 March 1953) was an Estonian politician.

Kurvits was born on 13 January 1895. He was elected to the Estonian Provincial Assembly, which governed the Autonomous Governorate of Estonia between 1917 and 1919; he served the full term. He did not sit in the newly formed Republic of Estonia's Asutav Kogu (Constituent Assembly) or its Riigikogu (Parliament). He died in 1953 in Chicago in the United States.
