= Karl August Baars =

Estonian lawyer and politician

Karl August Baars (also known as Kaarel August Baars; 25 March 1875 – 27 February 1942) was an Estonian lawyer and politician.

Baars was born at Iigaste Manor (now in Valga Parish) in Dorpat County on 25 March [O.S. 13 March] 1875.

Baars was a lawyer. He was elected to the Estonian Provincial Assembly, which governed the Autonomous Governorate of Estonia between 1917 and 1919, and served as the First Assistant Chairman between 27 November 1918 and 3 February 1919. He sat on the Asutav Kogu (Constituent Assembly) and each of the first five legislatures of the newly formed Riigikogu, between 1920 and 1934. He was Minister of Finance between 26 October 1920 and 25 January 1921, and served twice as Minister of Justice: between 14 and 25 January 1921 and between 1 April and 14 May 1924.

Baars was arrested during the Soviet occupation of Estonia during the Second World War, and he was sentenced to death and transported to the Kirov Oblast. He died on 27 February 1942, before the death sentence could be carried out.
