= Hans Riiberg =

Estonian politician

Hans Riiberg (also Hans Riberg; 1871 Luiste Parish (now Märjamaa Parish), Kreis Wiek - ?) was an Estonian politician. He was a member of Estonian Provincial Assembly.
