= Ants Piip's cabinet =

Government of Estonia from 1920 to 1921

Ants Piip's cabinet was in office in Estonia from 26 October 1920 to 25 January 1921, when it was succeeded by Konstantin Päts' first cabinet.

== Members ==
This cabinet's members were the following:

Name	Portrait	Position
Ants Piip		Prime Minister and War Minister
Otto Strandman		Minister of Foreign Affairs and Minister of Justice
Karl Baars		Minister of Monetary Affairs
Theodor Pool		Minister of Agricultural Affairs
Juhan Kukk		Minister of Transport
Lui Olesk		Minister of Labor and Welfare; Minister of Internal Affairs
Juhan Kukk		Minister of Commerce and Industry; Minister of Roads
Jüri Annusson		Minister of Education
Peet Johanson		Minister of Nutrition
