= Hugo Reiman =

Estonian politician

Hugo Karl Ferdinand Reiman (9 January 1887 Tartu – 13 January 1957 Tallinn) was an Estonian statistician and politician. He was a member of the Estonian Provincial Assembly. On 26 November 1918, he resigned his position and he was replaced by Aleksander Oinas.
