= Juhan Kalm =

Estonian politician, agronomist

Juhan Kalm (1884–1953) was an Estonian farmer, agronomist and politician.

Kalm was born on 19 March 1884 in Saadjärve in Tartu County and worked as a farmer and agronomist. He was elected to the Estonian Provincial Assembly, which governed the Autonomous Governorate of Estonia between 1917 and 1919; he served for the whole term, but did not sit in the newly formed Republic of Estonia's Asutav Kogu (Constituent Assembly) or Riigikogu (Parliament). Kalm died in Canada on 17 July 1953.
