= Karl Saral =

Estonian politician

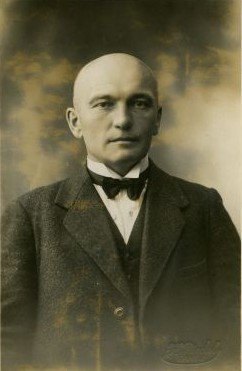
Karl Saral

Karl Saral (5 February 1880 Kuigatsi Parish, Tartu County – 13 June 1942 Krivosheino District, Tomsk Oblast, Russia) was an Estonian politician. He was a member of Estonian Provincial Assembly. From 27 November 1918 to 3 February 1919 he was Second Assistant Chairman of the assembly.
