= Victor Neggo =

Estonian politician, diplomat, educator

Victor Neggo (24 December 1890 – 15 June 1942) was an Estonian educator, politician and diplomat. His surname was also sometimes spelt Neggu or Nego, and he was known by the forenames Aleksander-Viktor, Karl-Aleksander and Viktor Alexander Woldemar, as well as the pseudonym Jursi Sander.

== Early life and education ==
Neggo was born on 24 December 1890 in Kuressaare, to Alexander Neggo, a farmer, and his wife Karoline, née Perker. He was home-schooled until 1900, when he enrolled at a private school in Kuressaare. In 1901, he began studying at the town's gymnasium (Estonian: gümnaasium). Between 1910 and 1911, he attended the faculty of mathematics and physics at St Petersburg University, and then spent the periods 1911–13 and 1914–16 at the University of Tartu, graduating in 1916. He returned to Tartu to study law between 1920 and 1922.

== Career ==
Neggo taught at Tartu Commercial School between 1913 and 1914, and at schools in Tallinn between 1916 and 1918, when he became office manager of the business Fr. Kangro, Neggo ja Ko. He was elected to the Provincial Assembly of the Autonomous Governorate of Estonia and served throughout its only session, which lasted from 14 July 1917 until 23 April 1919. He was selected to be second assistant secretary of the Assembly and served between 25 October 1917 and 27 November 1918, when he became first assistant secretary, which office he vacated on 3 February 1919. In the meantime, he was also Provincial Commissioner of Saaremaa (1918–19) and was charge d'affaires and consul to the Northwest Government in Pskov in 1919. He was subsequently Secretary at the Estonian consulate in Berlin (1919–20) and lectured at military schools between 1921 and 1923, when he continued with his business practices. Between 1925 and 1931, he prepared propaganda for the General Staff of the Estonian Defence League.

He returned to teaching in Tallinn high schools in 1924, before lecturing at Tallinn College from 1925 to 1931 and Kaarli Gymnasium from 1926 to 1931. He was then Inspector of the Narva Gymnasium for a year, before teaching at Valga City Gymnasium until 1934, when he was appointed director of the Tartu Boy's Gymnasium; he was also director of the Tartu Technical School from 1935. He was a member of the second chamber of the Estonian National Assembly which sat in 1937. Neggo was removed from both teaching offices and arrested by the occupying Soviet authorities on 23 December 1940 in Tartu. He was sentenced to death and deported to Molotov oblast, where he was executed on 15 June 1942.
