= Estonian Radical Democratic Party =

Estonian political party

The Estonian Radical Democratic Party (Estonian: Eesti Radikaal-Demokraatlik Erakond, ERDE) was a political party in Estonia.

== History ==
The party had its roots in the Tallinn Radicals, who had formed in the early 1900s around Konstantin Päts and his Teataja newspaper. By 1917 the group had coalesced into the Radical Democratic Party, which won four seats in the Estonian Provincial Assembly in 1917. In the Provincial Assembly the party was a member of the Democratic Bloc alongside the Estonian Democratic Party and the Rural League.

A rightwards shift in the party in 1918 resulted in Päts leaving to join the Rural League, leaving Ado Birk as the most prominent party member. The Bloc contested the 1918 elections together, winning around 23% of the vote. Prior to the 1919 elections the ERDE merged with the Democratic Party to form the Estonian People's Party.
