= Johannes Jaanis =

Estonian politician

Johannes Jaanis (also Johannes Janis; 15 September 1888 in Kalvi (now in Viru-Nigula Parish), Wierland County – 12 February 1959 in Paris, France) was an Estonian politician. He was a member of II Riigikogu.
