= Juhan Mihkel Ainson =

Estonian politician (1873–1962)

Juhan Mihkel Ainson (1 July 1873 – 1962), also known as Johan Mihkel Ainson, was an Estonian politician.

Born in the village of Holstre on 1 July 1873, Ainson was a doctor and practised as a veterinary scientist. He was a member of the Provincial Assembly which governed the Autonomous Governorate of Estonia between 1917 and 1919. After the Estonian War of Independence allowed Estonia to set up its own constitution, he sat on the Constituent Assembly which drafted it. He was a member from the start of the session on 23 April 1919 until he stepped down on 18 December 1919; Juhan Ostrat replaced him. Ainson sat in the Constituent Assembly as a member of the Estonian People's Party.

Ainson died in 1962 in West Germany.
