= Ants Roos =

Estonian politician

Ants Roos (also Hans Reinhold Roos; 6 April 1885 in Paide – 11 April 1962 in New York) was an Estonian politician. He was a member of the Estonian Provincial Assembly.
