= Social Travaillist Party =

Estonian political party

The Social Travaillist Party was a political party in Estonia.

== History ==
The party was founded in July 1917 by Ants Piip and Julius Seljamaa order to contest the Estonian Provincial Assembly elections that year. It was modelled on the French Radical Socialist Party, and used the French "Travail" in its name.

The party co-operated closely with the Estonian Radical Socialist Party and the two became known as the "Labourites". The Labourites won 11 of the 62 seats in the Assembly elections, becoming the second-largest faction after the Rural League, and went on to finish second again in the 1918 Constituent Assembly elections.

In 1919 the two parties merged to form the Estonian Labour Party.

== Ideology ==
The Social Travaillist Party aimed to mediate between the conservative agrarian parties and the revolutionary parties in the left. It gained its support from civil servants and commercial workers.
