= Kalvi =

Village in Estonia

- Village
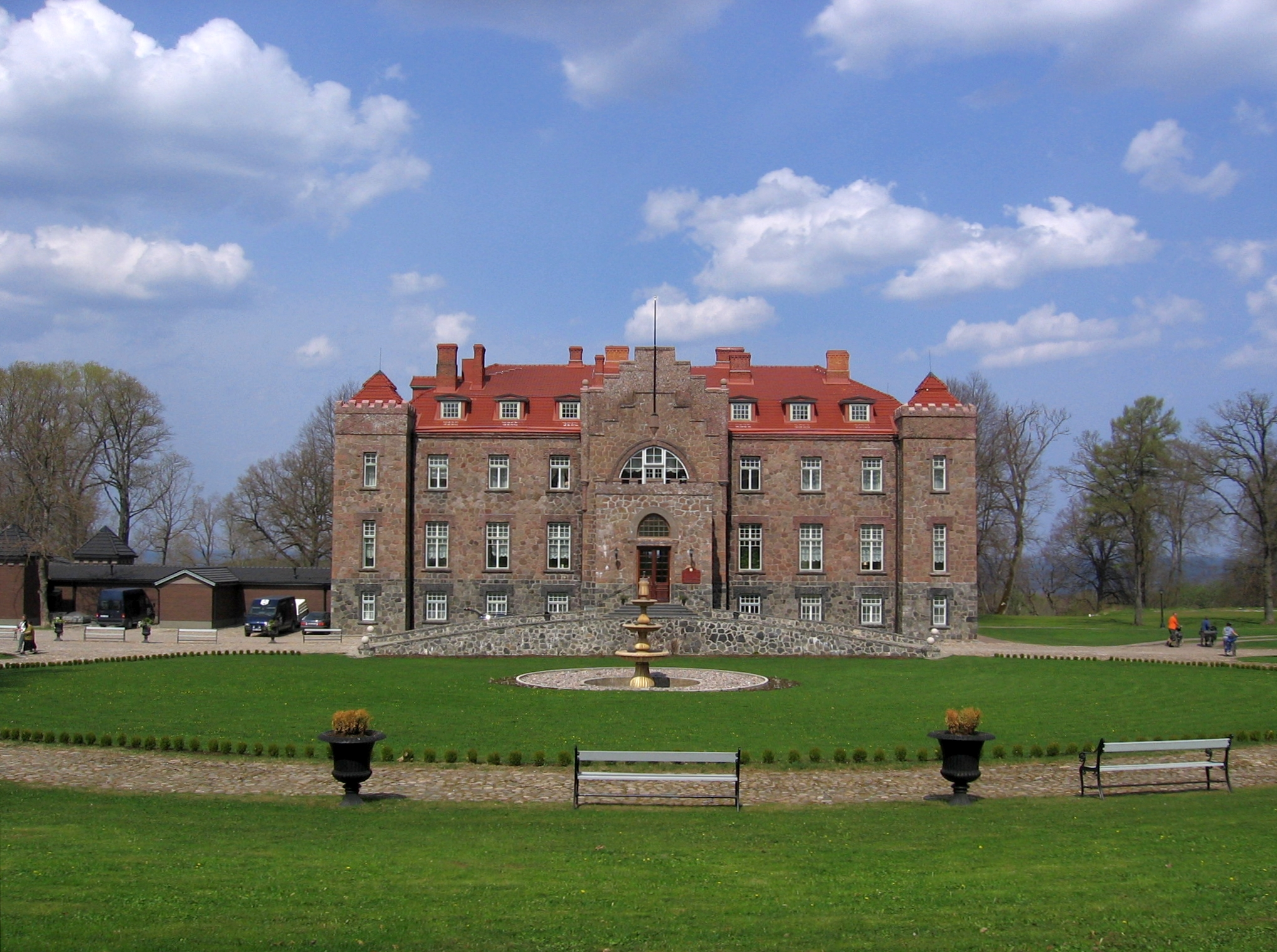
- Main building of Kalvi Manor

- Location in Estonia
- Coordinates: 59°28′49″N 26°47′17″E
- Country: Estonia
- County: Lääne-Viru County
- Municipality: Viru-Nigula Parish
- First mentioned: 1485

Population (01.01.2012)
  - Total: 51

Kalvi is a village in Viru-Nigula Parish, Lääne-Viru County, in northeastern Estonia. It is located about 4 km (2 mi) north of the Tallinn–Narva road (part of E20), 5 km (3 mi) northwest of Aseri and 7 km (4 mi) northeast of Viru-Nigula, on the coast of the Gulf of Finland. Kalvi has a population of 51 (as of 1 January 2012).

Kalvi is best known for its Medieval manor. It was first mentioned in 1485. The owners von Lodes had built there one of the grandiosest vassal fortresses in Estonia. Ca. 30 m wide trapezoid-shaped castellum type fortress was probably built in the beginning of the 15th century. It is also possible that the manor had existed already in 13th–14th centuries.

A new Early-Classical main building was erected on the eastern wing of the fortress, by the von Essens. In 1910, it burned down and was replaced by a new luxurious eclectic main building nearby in 1913. The manor was owned by the von Stackelbergs until 1940. Nowadays, a hotel and a restaurant operate in the building.

Russian military commander Magnus Gustav von Essen (1759–1813) was born in Kalvi Manor. Soviet Estonian political leader Johannes Käbin (1905–1999) was born in Kalvi before emigrating to Russia. Politicians Anna Leetsmann and Johannes Jaanis were also born in Kalvi.

== Gallery ==
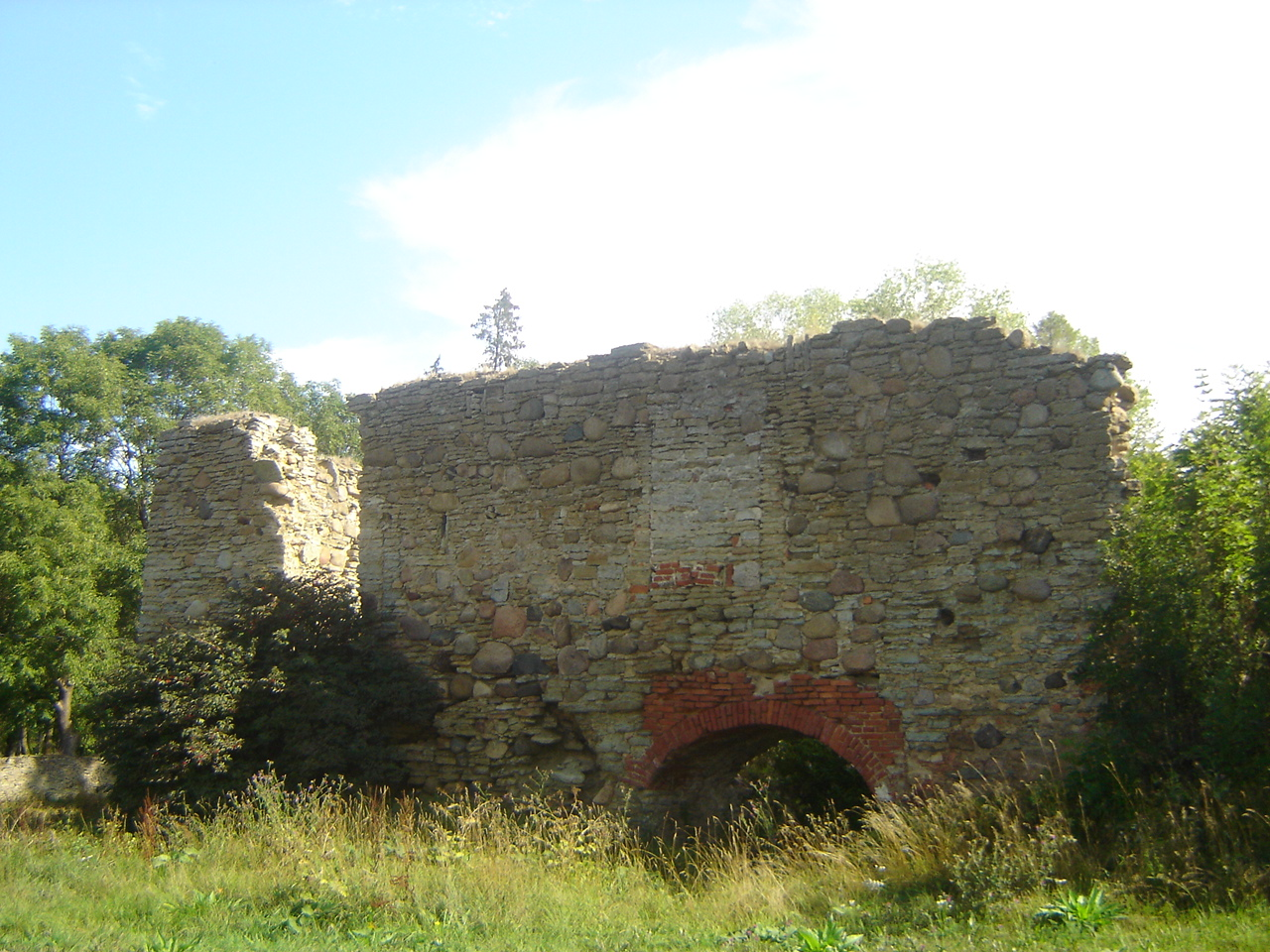
The ruins of the Kalvi fortress.

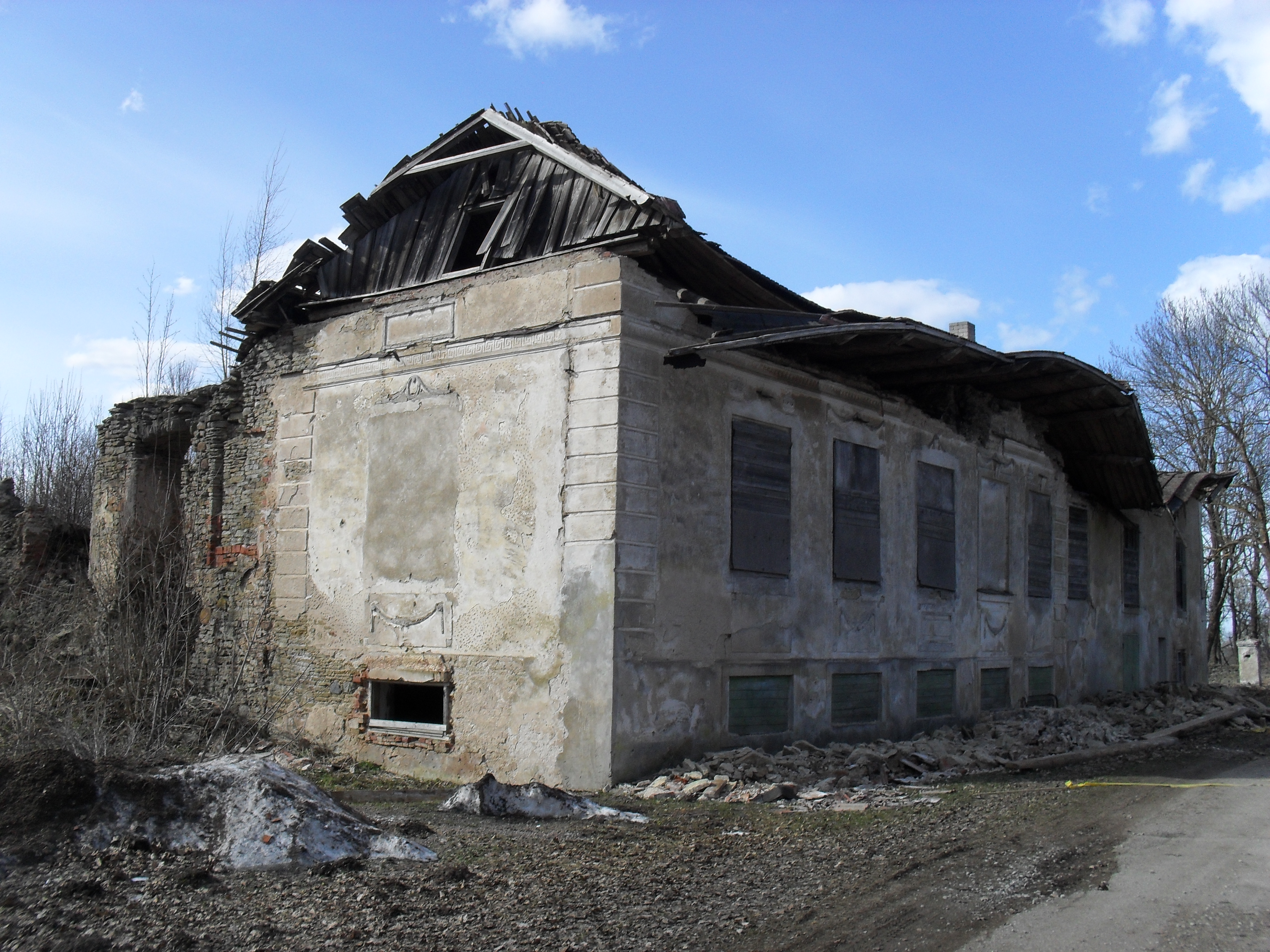
The ruins of the old main building of Kalvi Manor.

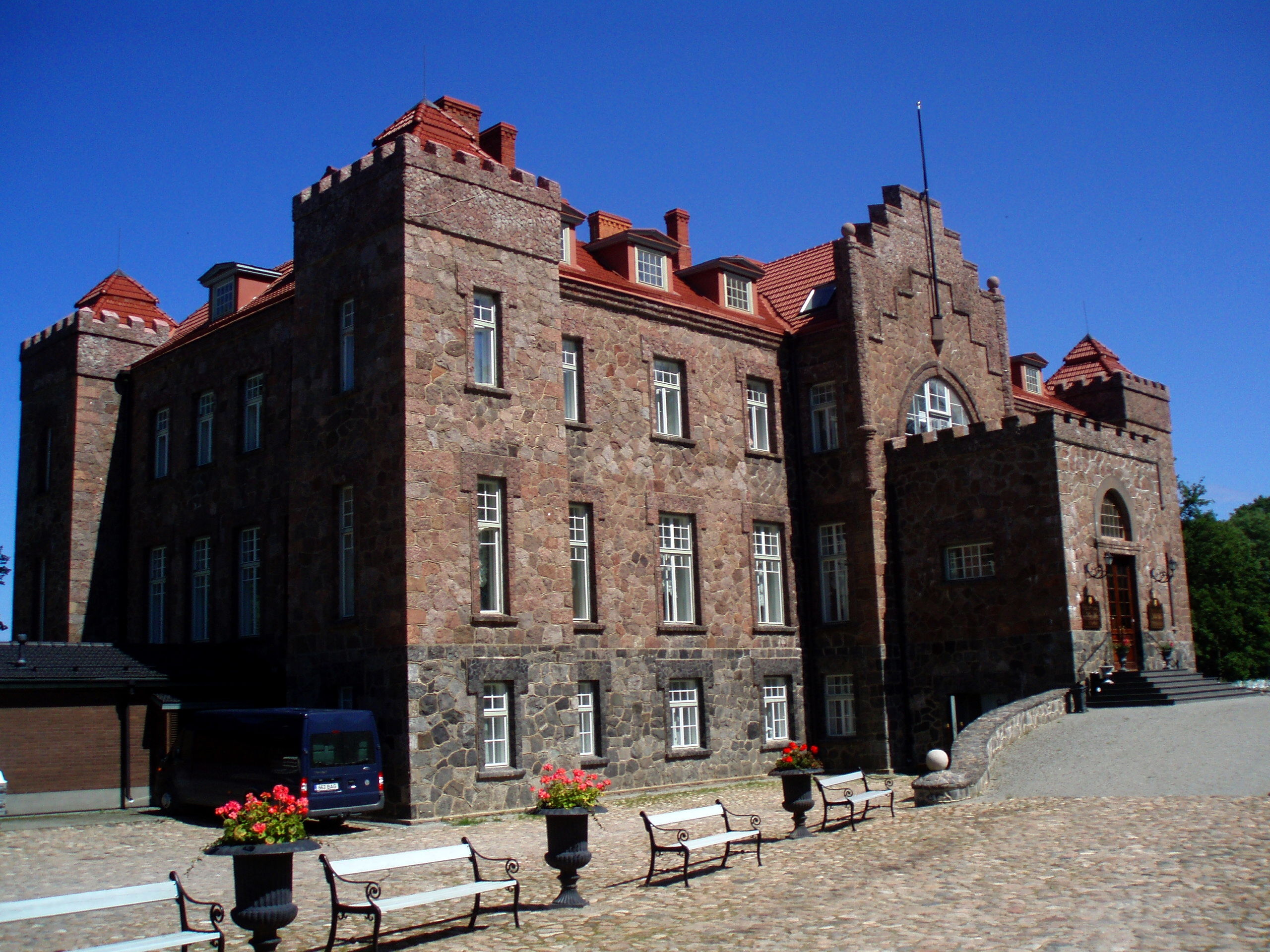
The new main building of Kalvi Manor from 1913.

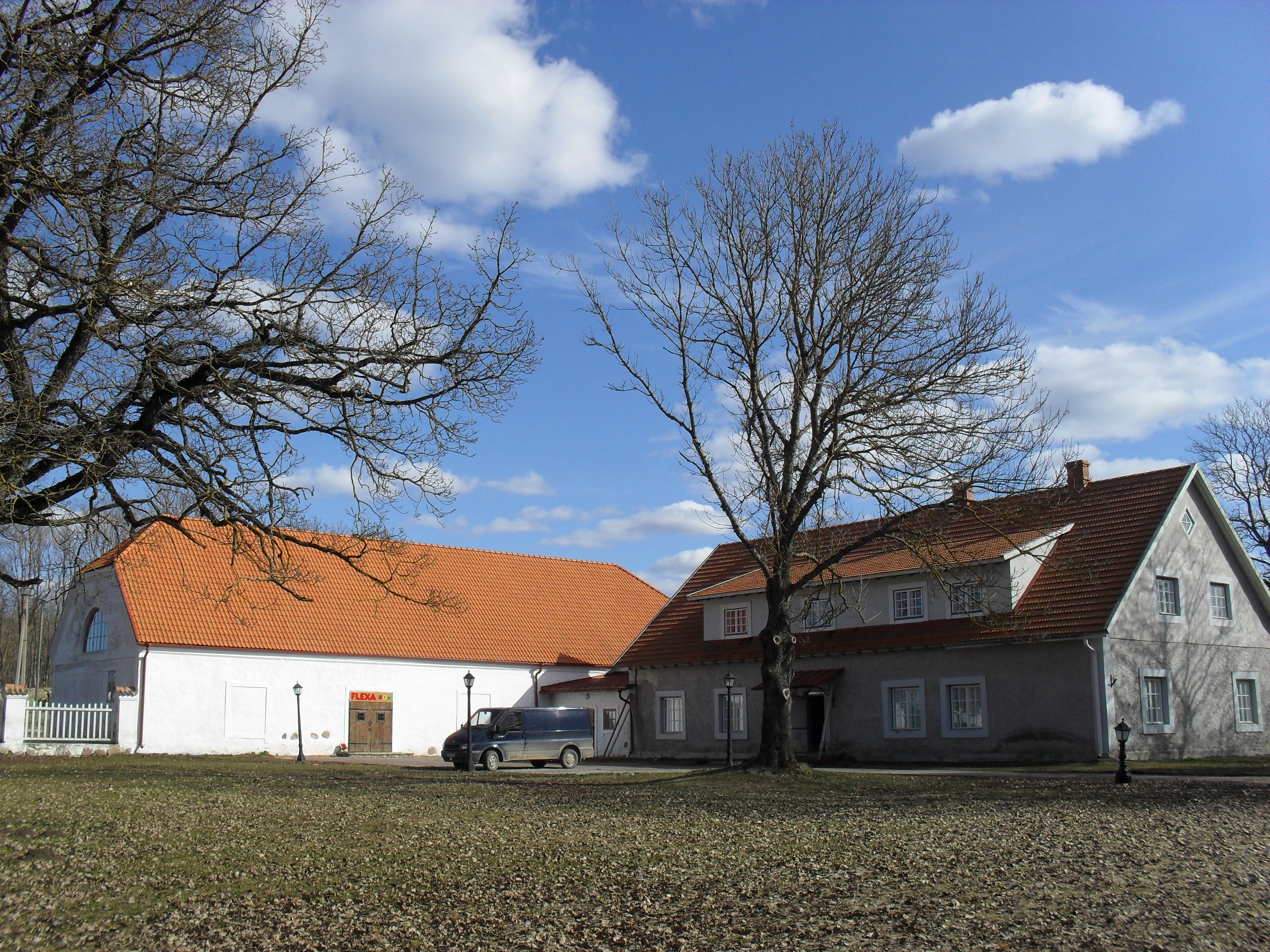
The granary and the servant house.

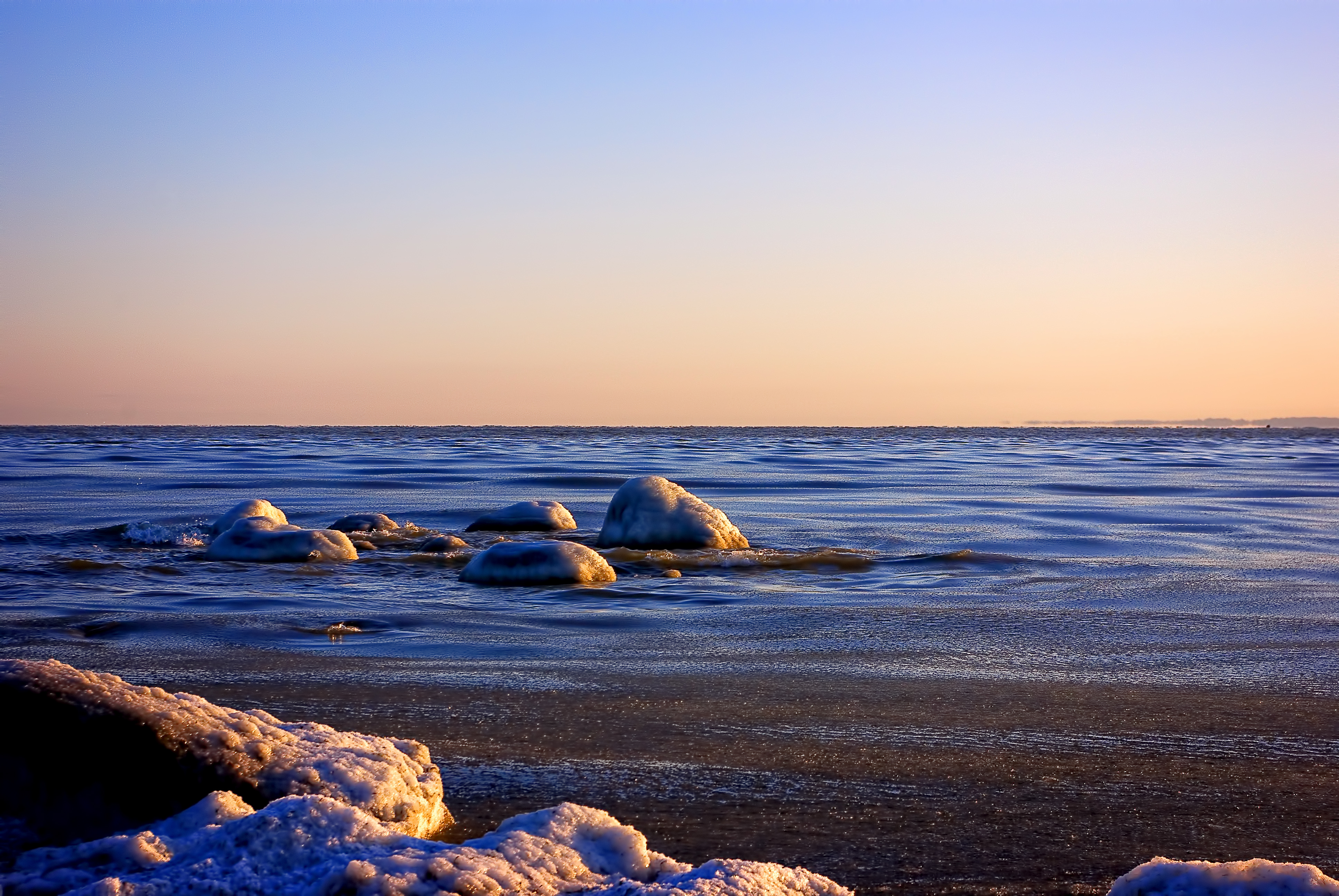
Beach at Kalvi, with glacial erratic boulders.
