= Friedrich Volrad Mikkelsaar =

Estonian educator and politician

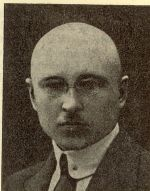
Friedrich Volrad Mikkelsaar

Friedrich Volrad Mikkelsaar (1886–1930) was an Estonian educator, educational administrator and politician.

Mikkelsaar was the founder of the foundations of school organization in the Republic of Estonia, the leaders of the school renewal movement, he was in favor of democratic school organization, a convergence and work school and a secondary school with vocational education.

== Early life and education ==
Mikkelsaar was born on 10 December 1886 in the schoolhouse in Linnamäe, Võru County, where his father Gustav (1847–1926) was schoolmaster and his mother, Anna Marie (née Haller) was a housewife. Gustav and his father Jaan came from Kahkva, but Gustav spent seven years as the teacher in Nursi before arriving at Linnamäe, where he spent 23 years teaching. Friedrich was taught by his father and then studied at Urvaste rural school between 1897 and 1899, after which he attended Võru city school until 1905.

== Career ==
He spent a year training to be a primary school teacher at Tallinn's Katariina Linnakool (City School), graduating in 1906. He then studied at St Petersburg Institute of Teachers, graduating in 1909, and started teaching at Jaunjelgava city school. In 1910, he moved to Haapsalu city school, where he taught until 1913 when he joined the Valga kõrgemas algkoolis (Higher Primary School); he remained there for four years. From 1917 to 1918, he was a Public School Inspector for Tartu and then worked at the Ministry of Education until his death, on 5 March 1930 at Taagepera in Valga County.

Mikkelsaar was also active in politics. He was elected to the Provincial Assembly of the newly-formed Autonomous Governorate of Estonia, which sat between 14 July 1917 and 23 April 1919. He served for the duration of the assembly.
