= Juhan Jaanuson =

Estonian politician

Juhan Jaanuson (1894–1967), also known as Joann Jaanuson, Juhan Janusson and Joann Janusson, was an Estonian statistician and politician.

Jaanuson was born on 28 October 1894 in Karksi in Viljandi County and worked as a statistician. He was elected to the Estonian Provincial Assembly, which governed the Autonomous Governorate of Estonia between 1917 and 1919; he served for the whole term, but did not sit in the newly formed Republic of Estonia's Asutav Kogu (Constituent Assembly) or the Riigikogu. He died on 17 January 1967 in Tallinn.
