= Gustav Viard =

Estonian politician

Gustav Viard (15 August 1881 – 28 September 1968, in Tallinn) was an Estonian politician.

In 1920 he was Minister of Nutrition.
