= Mari Raamot =

Estonian activist (1872–1966)

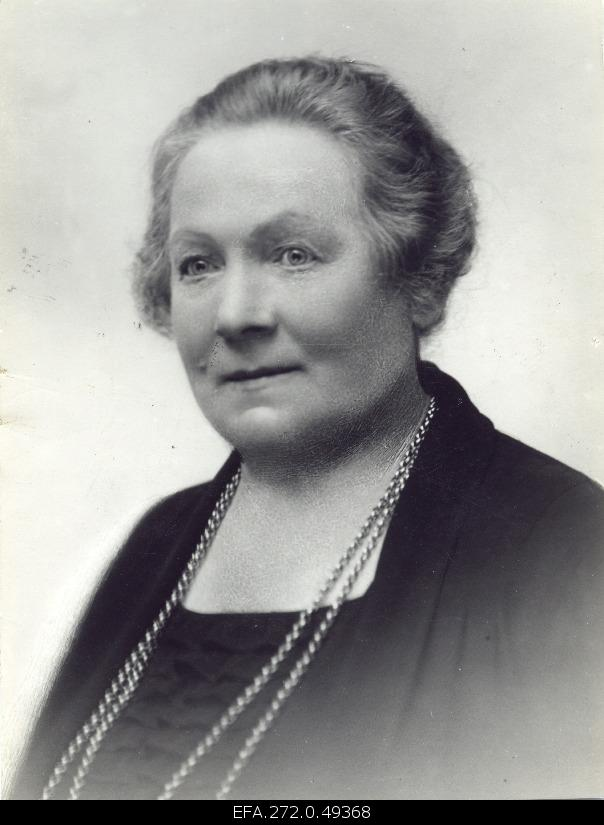
Mari Raamot in 1932

Mari Raamot (birth name Mari Tamm; August 6, 1872 in Kiltsi, Tarvastu Parish (now Viljandi Parish), Kreis Fellin – March 12, 1966 in New York City) was an Estonian socialist, homemaker, and founder of the Estonian women's national defense movement.

She was born in Kiltsi, Tarvastu Parish (now Viljandi Parish), Kreis Fellin as the daughter of a farmer. One of her four sisters was singer and pedagogue Aino Tamm. Her brother was the horn player and music figure Jaan Tamm. During her teenage years she studied home economics at the Lilli Suburg Girls' School in Viljandi, then at Königsberg, and later at Kiel and Leipzig, and worked as a home teacher in St. Petersburg.

In 1899, married politician Jaan Raamot in St. Petersburg. Their son Ilmar Raamot was an agronomist and politician. Jaan Raamot died in 1927

During the first German occupation in 1918, she was imprisoned. Later, she was a member of the Estonian Red Cross General Government and the head of the fundraising department, one of the founders and chairman of the Young Women Christian Association, the founders and chairwoman of the Women's Home Guard 1927–1936, and one of the founders of the Housewives Movement.
