= Jaan Tõnisson's first cabinet =

Government of Estonia from 1919 to 1920

Jaan Tõnisson's first cabinet was in office in Estonia from 18 November 1919 to 28 July 1920, when it was succeeded by Ado Birk's cabinet.

== Members ==
This cabinet's members were the following:

Name	Portrait	Position
Jaan Tõnisson		Prime Minister
Ado Birk		Minister of Foreign Affairs
Theodor Pool		Minister of Agricultural Affairs
Eduard Säkk		Minister of Roads
Konstantin Treffner		Minister of Education
Aleksander Hellat		Minister of the Interior
Jüri Jaakson		Minister of Court
Juhan Kukk		Minister of Finance
Anton Palvadre		Minister of Labour and Welfare
Jaan Kriisa		Minister of Nutrition
August Hanko		Minister of War
