= Juhan Lasn =

Estonian politician (1861–1930)

Juhan Lasn (1861–1930), also known as Johannes Lasn, was an Estonian politician.

Lasn was born on 29 February 1861 in Sauga, Pärnu County. He sat in the Estonian Provincial Assembly, which governed the Autonomous Governorate of Estonia; he served in the full session which sat between 14 July 1917 and 23 April 1919. He did not sit in the newly-formed Republic of Estonia's Asutav Kogu (Constituent Assembly) or Riigikogu (Parliament). Lasn died on 7 January 1930 in Pärnu.
