= Rannu =

Borough in Estonia

- Small borough
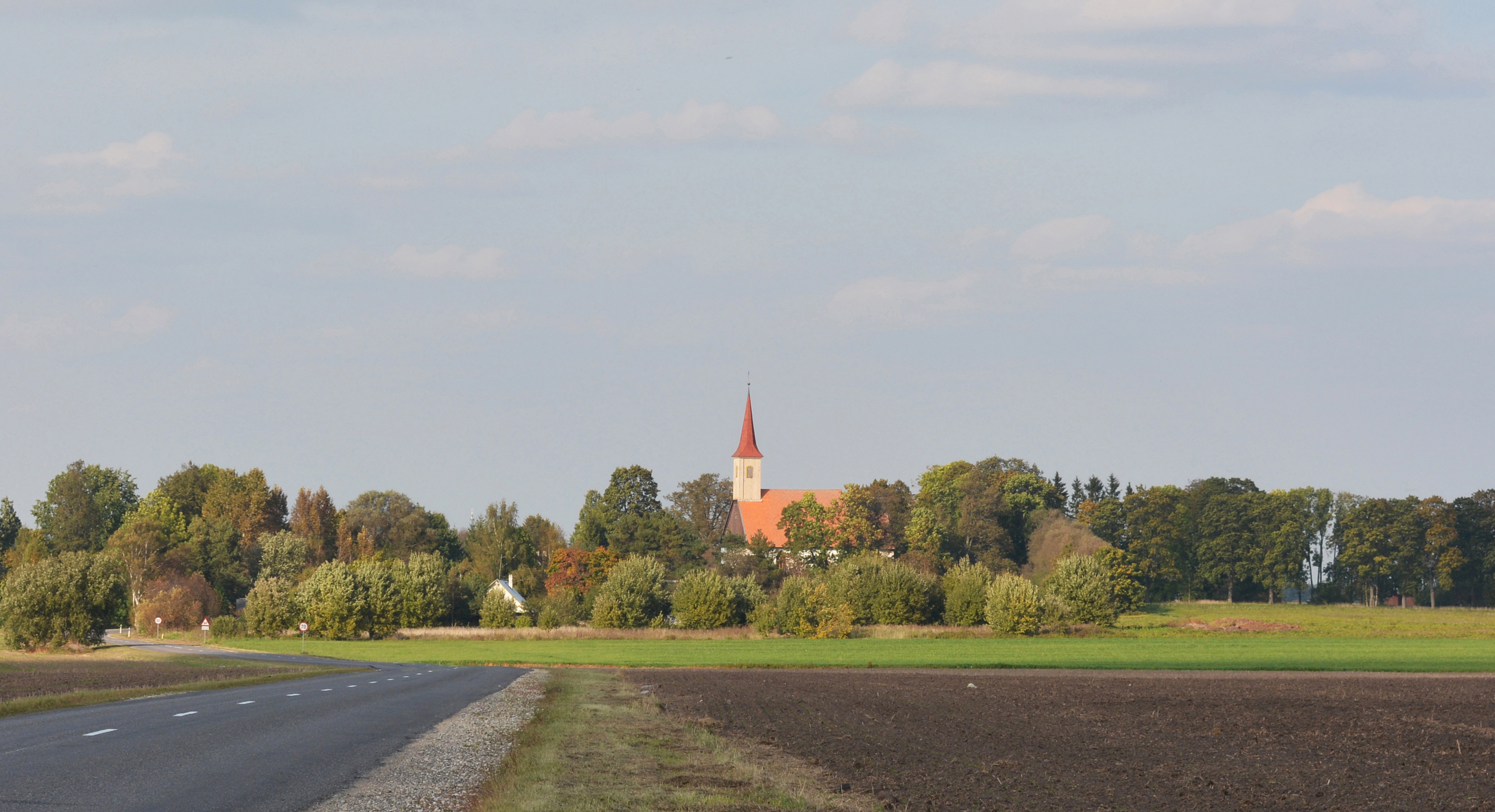

- Location in Estonia
- Coordinates: 58°14′22″N 26°13′12″E
- Country: Estonia
- County: Tartu County
- Municipality: Elva Parish
- Time zone: UTC+2 (EET)
  - Summer (DST): UTC+3 (EEST)

Rannu (German: Randen) is a small borough (Estonian: alevik) in Tartu County, Estonia.

== Gallery ==
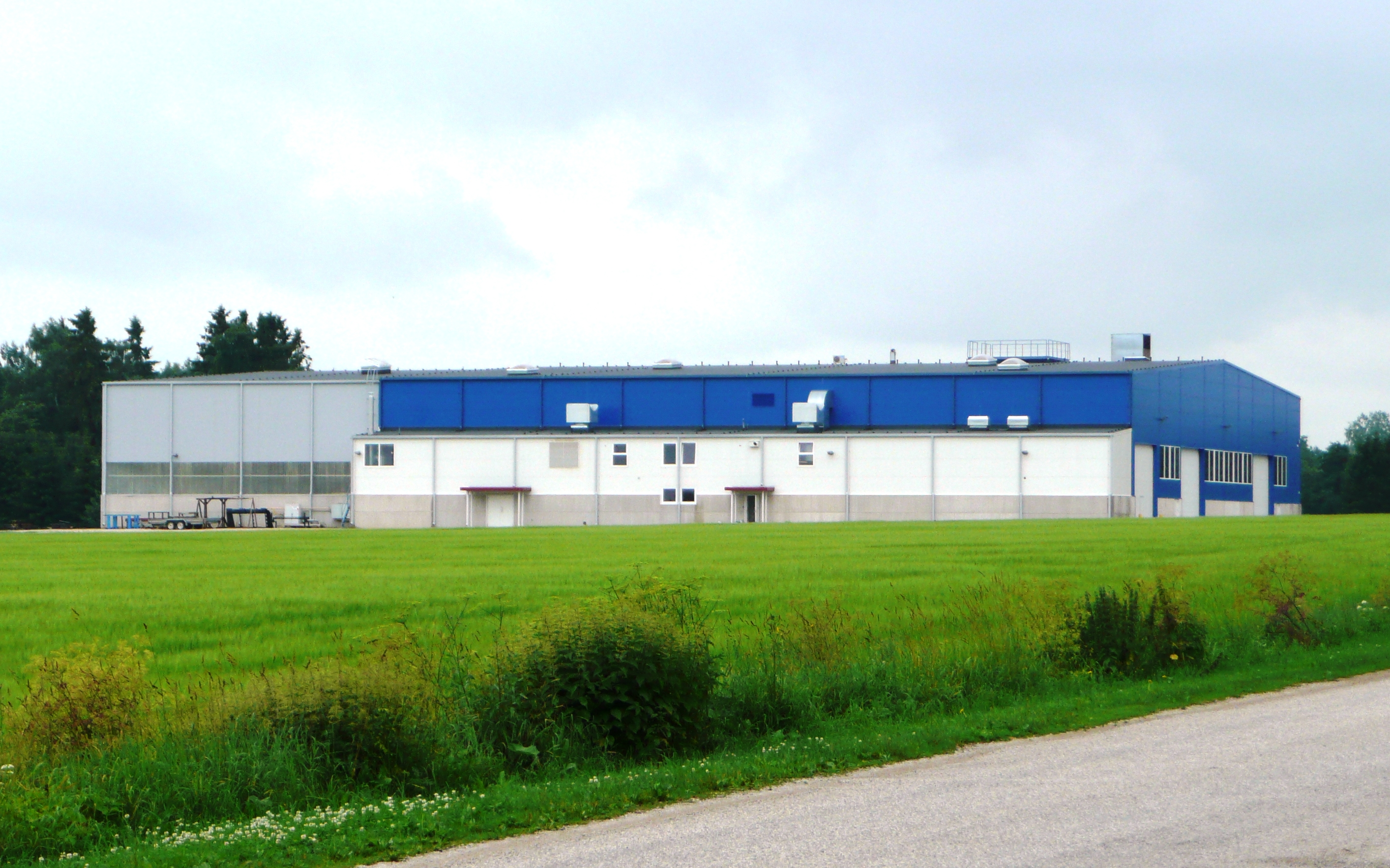
Industrial buildings

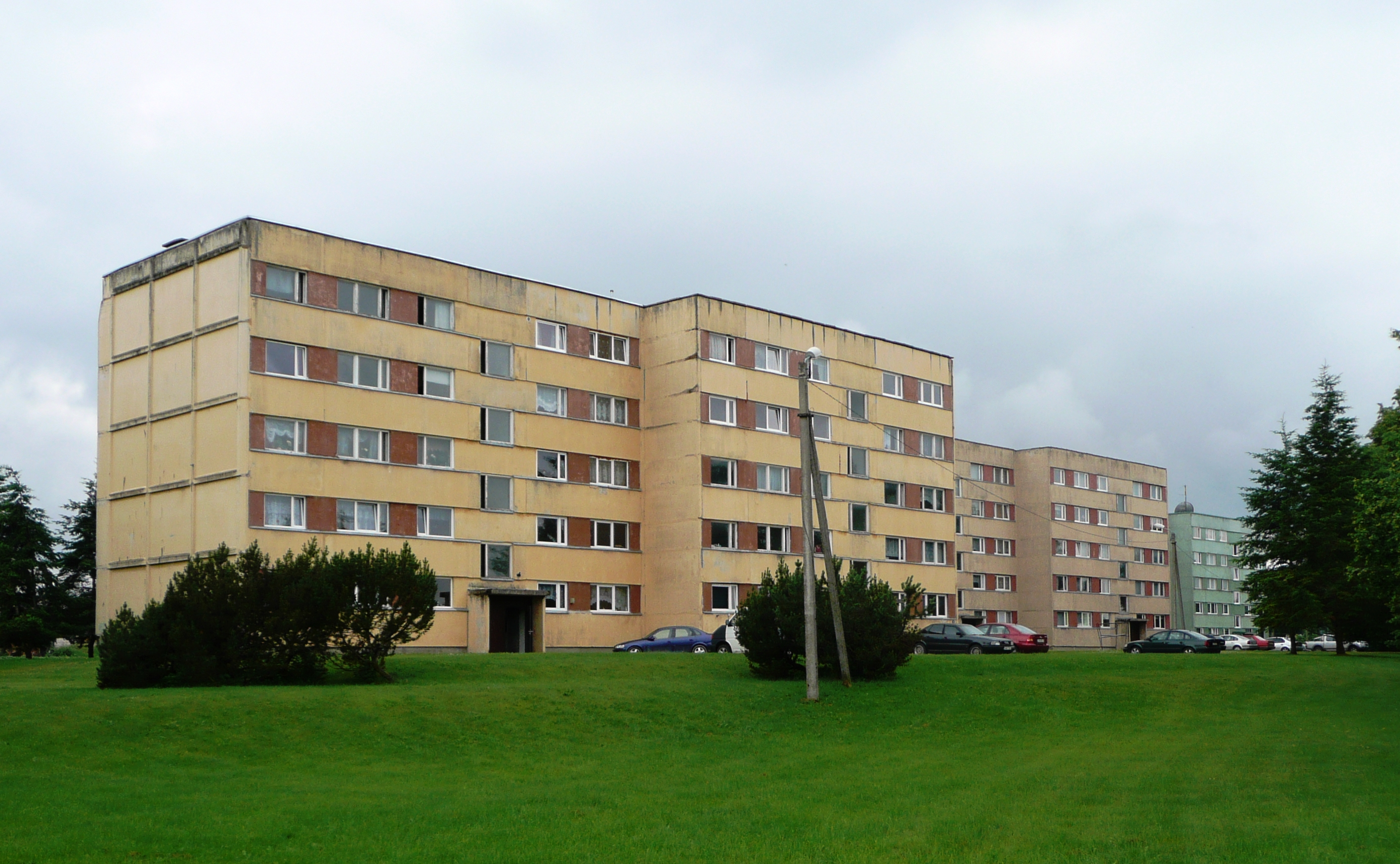
Apartment buildings

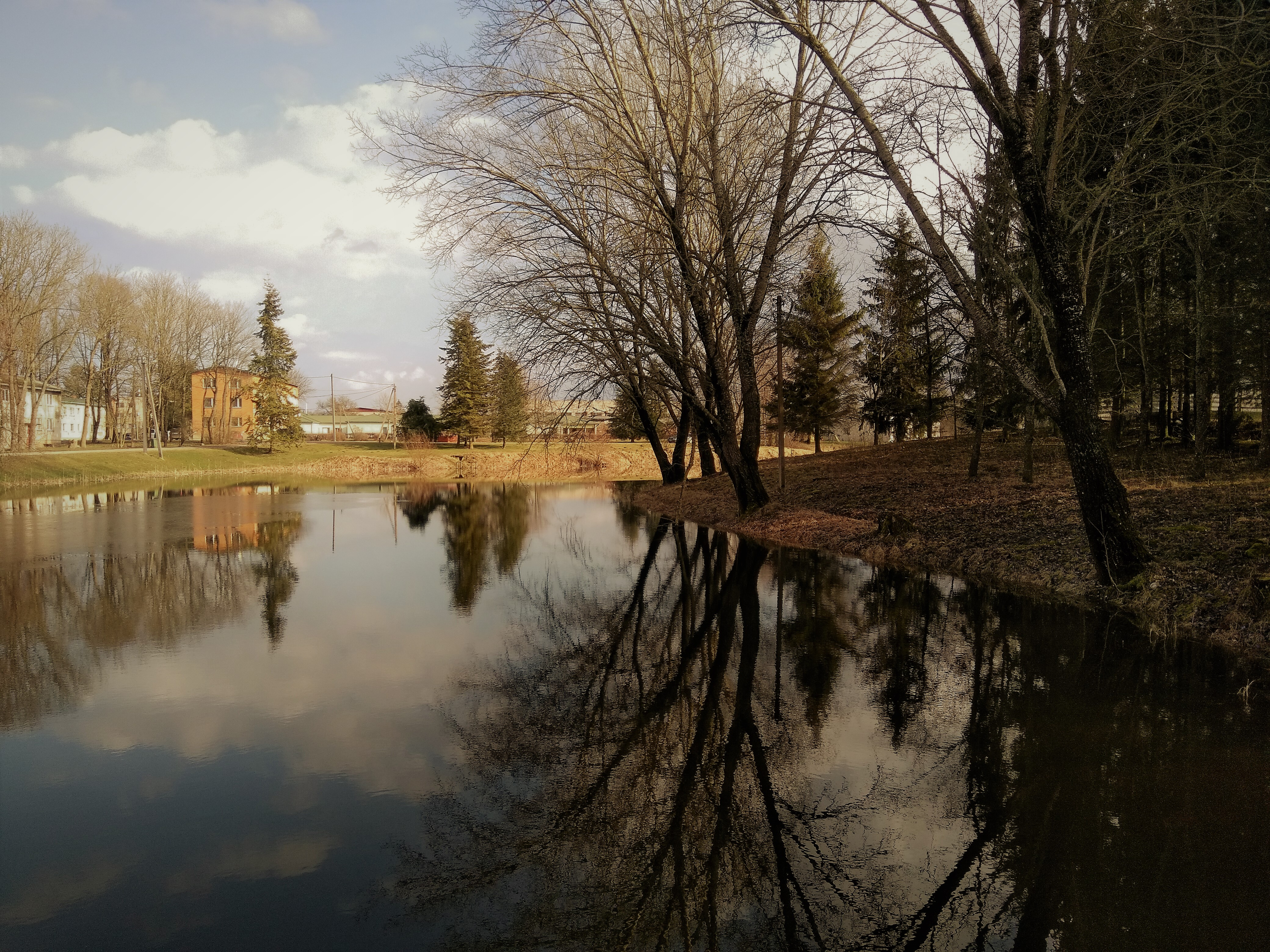
Reservoir and houses

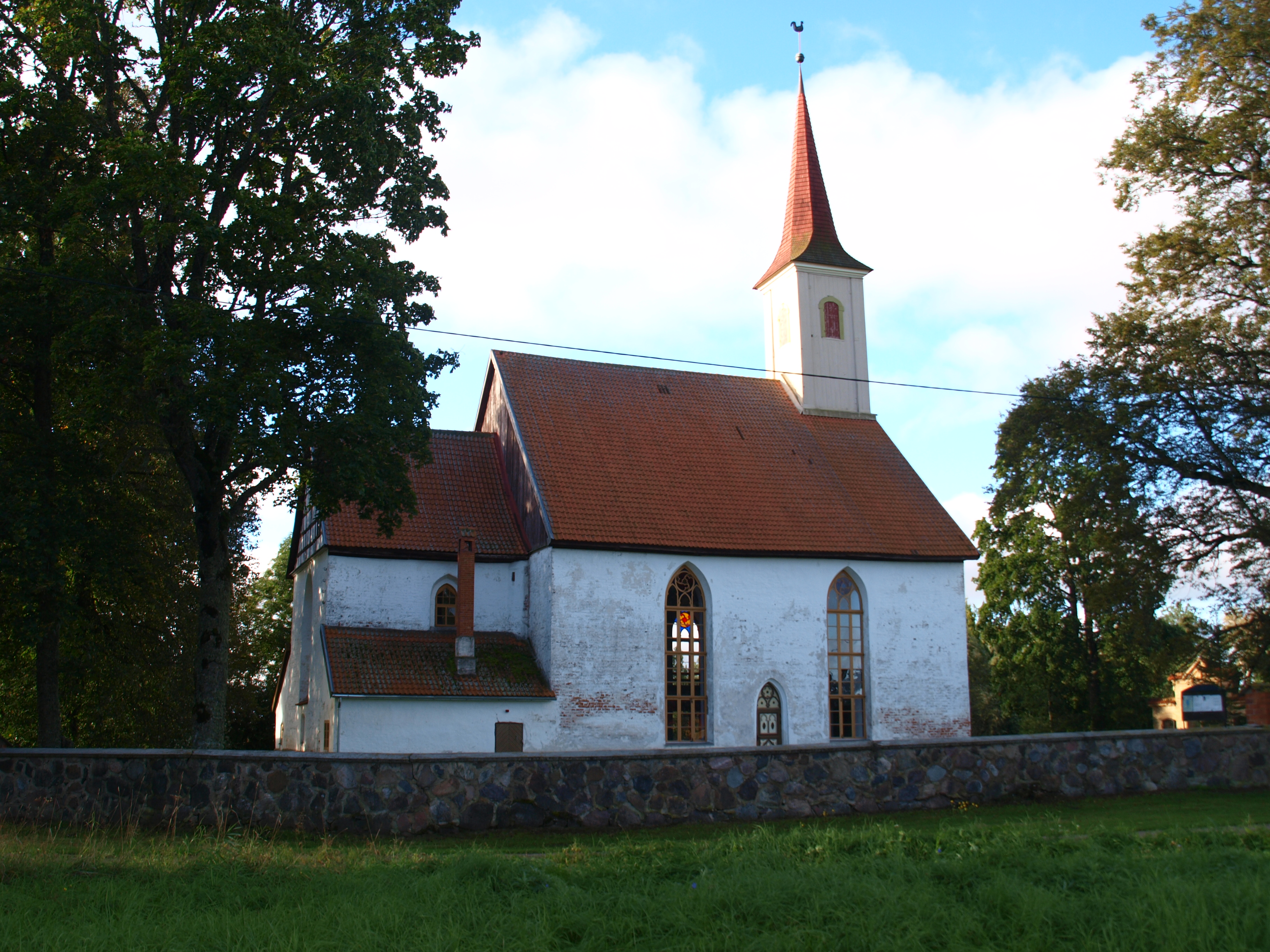
Church
