= Juhan Sütiste =

Estonian poet

Juhan Sütiste (until 1936 Johannes Schütz; 28 December 1899 in Tähtvere Parish, Tartu County – 10 February 1945 in Tallinn) was an Estonian poet.

During the Estonian War of Independence, he belonged to the reserve battalion of Tartu schoolteachers.

From 1938 to 1940, he was the dramaturge for the Estonian Drama Theatre in Tallinn.

In 1941, he was mobilized into the Tallinn Workers' Regiment.

== Works ==
- Rahutus (poetry collection, 1928)
- Peipsist mereni (poetry collection, 1930)
- Maha rahu (poetry collection, 1932)
- Kaks leeri (poetry collection, 1933)
- Südasuvi (poetry collection, 1934)
- Päikese ootel (poetry collection, 1935)
- Sadamad ja saared (poetry collection, 1936)
- Ringkäik (poetry collection, 1937)
- Kahe sõja vahel (cycle of poetry, 1937–1941)
- Valgus ja varjud (poetry collection, 1939)
- Ristikoerad (play, 1945)
