= Otto Strandman's first cabinet =

Government of Estonia from May 1919 to November 1919

Otto Strandman's cabinet was in office in Estonia from 9 May 1919 to 18 November 1919, when it was succeeded by Jaan Tõnisson's first cabinet.

== Members ==
This cabinet's members were the following:

Name	Portrait	Position
Otto Strandman		Prime Minister and War Minister
Aleksander Oinas		Minister of the Interior (until 18.07.1919)
Aleksander Hellat		Minister of the Interior (since 25.07.1919)
Jaan Poska		Minister of Foreign Affairs (until 20.09.1919)
Ants Piip		Minister of Foreign Affairs (since 09.10.1919)
Theodor Pool		Minister of Food and Agricultural Affairs
Jüri Jaakson		Minister of Justice
Anton Palvadre		Minister of Labour and Welfare
