= Tallinna Teataja =

Estonian newspaper

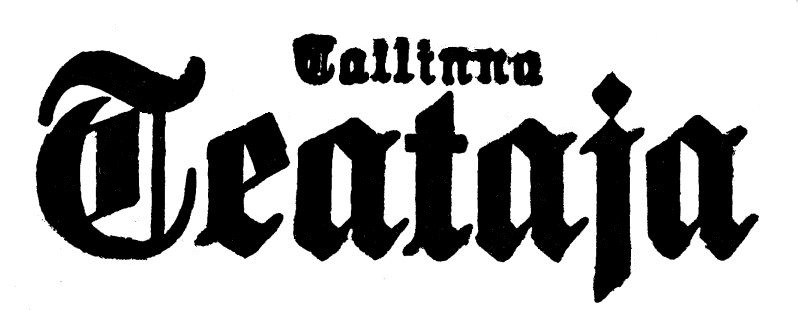
- Founded: 1910
- Ceased publication: 1922
- Language: Estonian
- Circulation: 6 x per week

Tallinna Teataja was a newspaper published between 1910 and 1922 in Tallinn, Estonia.

Publishers were:

- M. Schiffer (1910-1911 nr. 97)
- A. Kampf (1911 nr. 98-184)
- H. Ant ja J. Masing (1916 nr. 261 - 1917)
- Ed. Sarepera (1918 nr. 1-62).
