= Konstantin Päts's third provisional cabinet =

Government of Estonia from 1918 to 1919

Konstantin Päts's third provisional cabinet was in office in Estonia from 27 November 1918 to 9 May 1919, when it was succeeded by Otto Strandman's first cabinet.
