= Konstantin Päts's second provisional cabinet =

Government of Estonia from 11 November 1918 to 27 November 1918

Konstantin Päts's second provisional cabinet was in office in Estonia from 11 November 1918 to 27 November 1918, when it was succeeded by Konstantin Päts' third provisional cabinet.
