= Viktor Pihlak =

Estonian architect and politician

Viktor Pihlak (15 December 1886 – 10 July 1967 Tallinn) was an Estonian architect and politician.

In 1920 he was Minister of Commerce and Industry.
