= Artur Vallner =

Estonian educator and politician

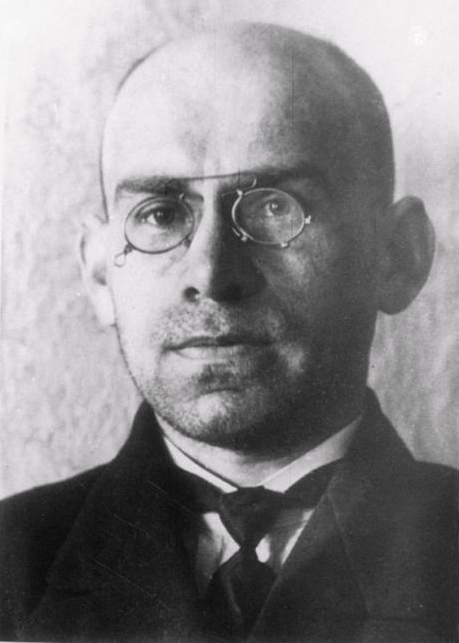
Artur Vallner

Artur Vallner (18 October 1887 Tallinn – 1939 (or 4 November 1937)) was an Estonian educator and politician.

In 1917 he was Chairman of Estonian Provincial Assembly. Vallner was executed during the Great Purge.
