= Aleksander Pürge =

Estonian politician

Aleksander Pürge (born Aleksander Ernst Bürger; 28 August 1887, Tallinn – 2 January 1940, Tallinn) was an Estonian politician, technical scientist, engineer, and military officer (lieutenant).

1920 he was Minister of Roads.
