= 1919 Estonian Constituent Assembly election =

1919 elections in Estonia

- 7 April 1919

120 seats in the Constituent Assembly 61 seats needed for a majority
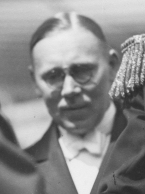

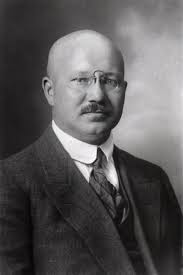

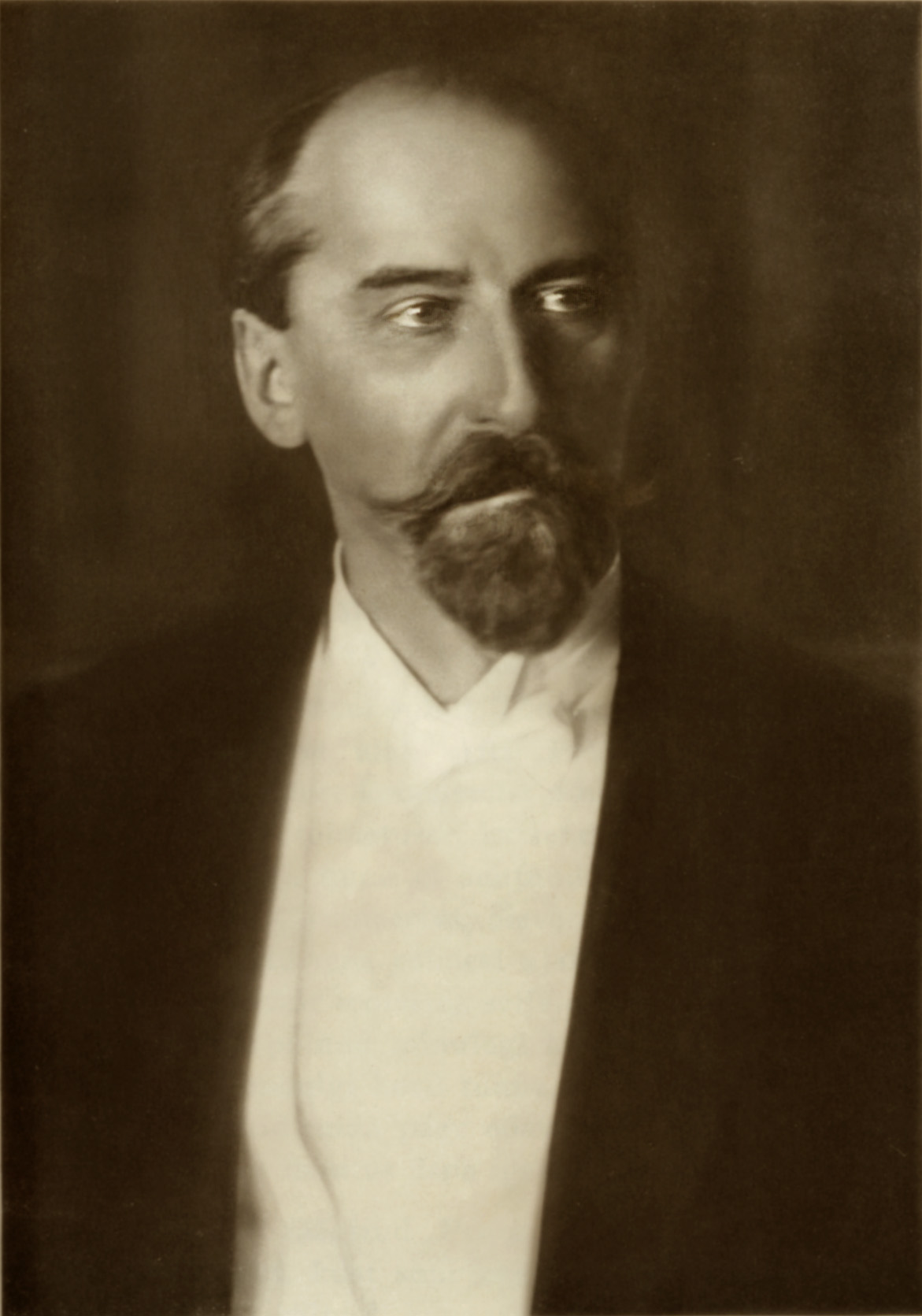
	First party	Second party	Third party
Leader	August Rei	Otto Strandman	Jaan Tõnisson
Party	ESTP	Labour Party	People's Party
Seats won	41	30	25
Popular vote	152,341	114,879	94,892
Percentage	33.27%	25.09%	20.72%
Prime Minister of the Provisional Government before election
Konstantin Päts
Estonian Country People's Union
Elected Prime Minister
Otto Strandman
Labour Party

Constituent Assembly elections were held in Estonia on 5–7 April 1919. The elections were called by the Estonian Provisional Government during the Estonian War of Independence. The Assembly was elected by party-list proportional representation in one nationwide district using the D'Hondt method. Eligible voters included soldiers at the front. The elections were won by left-wing and centrist parties.

== Results ==
Party	Votes	%	Seats
Estonian Social Democratic Workers' Party	152,341	33.27	41
Estonian Labour Party	114,879	25.09	30
Estonian People's Party	94,892	20.72	25
Rural League	29,989	6.55	8
Socialists-Revolutionaries	26,536	5.80	7
Christian Democratic Party	20,157	4.40	5
German Party in Estonia	11,462	2.50	3
Russian National Union	5,765	1.26	1
Party of the Residents of Hiiumaa Island	1,090	0.24	0
All-Estonian Sailors' Union	795	0.17	0
Total	457,906	100.00	120
Registered voters/turnout	653,000	–	
Source: McHale, Nohlen & Stöver
