= 1918 Estonian Constituent Assembly election =

1918 elections in Estonia

Elections to the Estonian Constituent Assembly were held on 3–4 February 1918. In some electoral districts, the elections were postponed until 9–10 February. During the October Revolution in 1917, the Bolsheviks also took power in parts of Estonia, mostly in urban areas in Northern Estonia. Parts of Estonia were already occupied by Germany and the elections were not held in these areas.

The Russian Social Democratic Labour Party (Bolsheviks) allowed the elections to be held, in hope of getting a majority of the votes. However, they achieved only 37% of the votes, leaving a majority for parties that supported Estonian independence. The Estonian Constituent Assembly was never convened after these elections, because the Communists annulled the elections and Germany occupied the rest of Estonia in the same February. New elections to the Constituent Assembly were held in 1919.

== Results ==
Party	Votes	%
Russian Social Democratic Labour Party (Bolsheviks)	87,113	37.20
Labourites	69,931	29.86
Democratic Bloc	54,504	23.28
Estonian Socialist Revolutionary Party (Left)	8,317	3.55
Christian Union	5,455	2.33
Estonian Social Democratic Workers' Party	4,075	1.74
Estonian Socialist Revolutionary Party (Right)	2,256	0.96
Union for Estonian Independents	1,312	0.56
Democratic Organization of Russian Citizens	1,197	0.51
Total	234,160	100.00
Total votes	234,902	–
Registered voters/turnout	315,026	74.57
Source: Eesti NSV ajaloo küsimusi
