= Jaan Raamot =

Estonian politician (1873–1927)

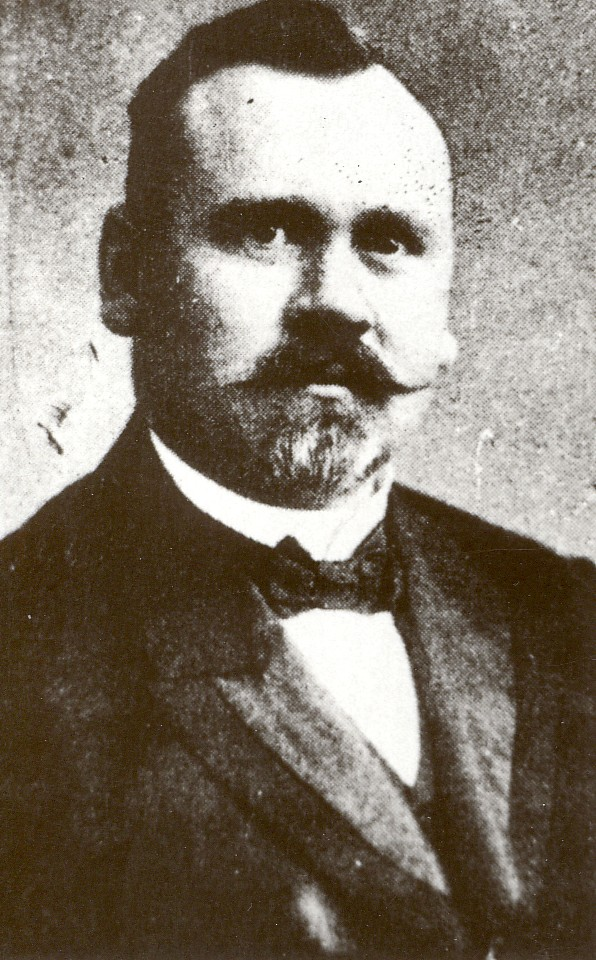
Jaan Raamot in 1927

Jaan Raamot (9 August 1873, Avaste – 5 January 1927, Jäneda) was an Estonian agrarian personnel, politician, pedagogue.

He was a member of Estonian Provincial Assembly and Asutav Kogu.

His spouse was Mari Raamot.
