= Estonian Provincial Assembly =

Estonian post-1917 revolution legislature

The Estonian Provincial Assembly or Estonian State Diet, (Note: Estonian: Eestimaa Kubermangu Ajutine Maanõukogu, (Ajutine) Maanõukogu, Eesti Maanõukogu, (Eesti) Maapäev) also known by its Estonian language name Maapäev, was elected in May–June 1917 during the Russian Revolution as the provincial parliament (diet) of the autonomous Governorate of Estonia. On 28 November 1917, after the Bolshevik coup in Petrograd (then Saint Petersburg, capital of Russia), the Assembly declared itself the sole sovereign power in the governorate of Estonia and called for the elections of Estonian Constituent Assembly. On the eve of the German occupation of Estonia during World War I the council of elders the Maapäev elected the Estonian Salvation Committee, who went on to issue the Estonian Declaration of Independence on 24 February 1918.

== History ==
On 12 April 1917 the Russian Provisional Government issued an order on the provisional autonomy of Estonia. The Governorate of Estonia (now northern Estonia) was merged with Estonian-speaking northern part of the Governorate of Livonia (now southern Estonia), to form the autonomous governorate. The Russian Provisional Government decreed that the provincial assembly be created with members elected by indirect universal suffrage.

Elections for the 62 deputies of the Maapäev were held in many stages; members representing the rural communities were elected in two-tiered elections in May–June, while the town representatives were elected in July–August 1917. The election process saw the creation and reorganization of Estonian national parties.

Six parties were represented at the diet, with three independent deputies and two deputies representing the local German and Swedish ethnic minorities.

== Results ==
Party	Seats
Rural League	13
STP–ERSP	11
Estonian Social Democratic Association	9
Estonian Socialist Revolutionary Party	8
Estonian Democratic Party	7
Russian Social Democratic Labour Party (Bolsheviks)	5
Estonian Radical Democratic Party	4
German ethnic minority	1
Swedish ethnic minority	1
Independents	3
Total	62
Source: Raun, Suny

== Aftermath ==
In the wake of the November 1917 Bolshevik coup in the Russian capital Petrograd (Saint Petersburg), when a local Bolshevik "Military Revolutionary Committee" staged a similar coup in the Estonian capital Tallinn (Reval), the Maapäev refused to recognize the new Bolshevik rule. The Bolsheviks then attempted to disband the council. In its last meeting on 15 November 1917, the Maapäev proclaimed itself the supreme legal authority of Estonia until the convening of the Constituent Assembly. The Committee of Elders was authorized to issue laws. The council was then dissolved by force on 26 November by the Bolsheviks, compelling leading politicians to go underground. In the Constituent Assembly elections in early 1918, which were organised by the Bolsheviks, two-thirds of the voters supported the parties who stood for national statehood. The Bolsheviks then immediately proclaimed the elections null and void. On 19 February 1918, the Committee of Elders of the Land Council decided to proclaim Estonian independence. A Salvation Committee (a three-member committee formed by the Maapäev as executive body for the time when the activities of the Assembly were hindered) with special powers was set up for that purpose. On 24 February, after the Bolsheviks abandoned Tallinn and one day before German forces occupied the country's capital city, the Salvation Committee issued a formal declaration of independence of the Republic of Estonia.

After the German occupation of Estonia ended in November 1918, the Maapäev continued as the legislature of Estonia until 1919.

== See also ==
- Autonomous Governorate of Estonia
- Salvation Committee
- History of Estonia
- List of Chairmen of the Estonian Provincial Assembly
- Estonian War of Independence
- Treaty of Tartu (Russian–Estonian)
