= Autonomous Governorate of Estonia =

Autonomous entity of the Russian Republic 1917–1918

Governorate of Estonia Estonian: Autonoomne Eestimaa kubermang
- Autonomous entity of the Russian Republic
- 1917–1918
- Capital: Reval (Tallinn)
- Government
  - Type: Autonomous governorate
- Commissar
  - 1917: Jaan Poska
- Legislature: Estonian Provincial Assembly
- History
  - Local autonomy: 12 April 1917
  - Sovereignty declared: 28 November 1917
  - Narva (including Ivangorod) added to the governorate: 3 January 1918
  - Independence declared: 24 February 1918
Preceded by	Succeeded by
Governorate of Estonia; Governorate of Livonia	Estonia
- Today part of: Estonia

The autonomous Governorate of Estonia (Note: Estonian: Eestimaa kubermang, German: Gouvernement Estland, Russian: Эстляндская губерния, romanized: Estlyandskaya guberniya) was an autonomous governorate of the Russian state, that existed from April 1917 to February 1918, centered in Tallinn. It was established as a result of political and administrative reforms implemented by the Russian Provisional Government, after the Russian Revolution in March 1917. Responding to demands of Estonian political leaders, the Government in Petrograd agreed to integrate several northern, ethnically Estonian districts of the Governorate of Livonia into the Governorate of Estonia, thus creating the enlarged and autonomous Estonian governorate on 12 April (1917). Estonian politician Jaan Poska was appointed Commissar (governor) of Estonia. In July 1917, the Assembly of Autonomous Estonia was elected, initially chaired by Artur Vallner, and later by Otto Strandman.

After the Bolshevik Revolution in November 1917, the Assembly refused to recognize political legitimacy and authority of the newly established Bolshevik Government in Petrovgrad, and proclaimed itself the supreme provisional and political authority in Estonia, but still without formal secession. Since local Bolsheviks succeeded in asserting full control in Tallinn, the Assembly was suppressed, but its leaders continued political activities in secret. They emerged in February 1918, and created the Estonian Salvation Committee, that issued the Estonian Declaration of Independence on 24 February, while the Imperial German Army was closing on Tallinn. The city was captured the next day, and the rest of Estonia fell by the beginning of March, thus establishing the German occupation of Estonia, that lasted until the end of 1918.

== History ==
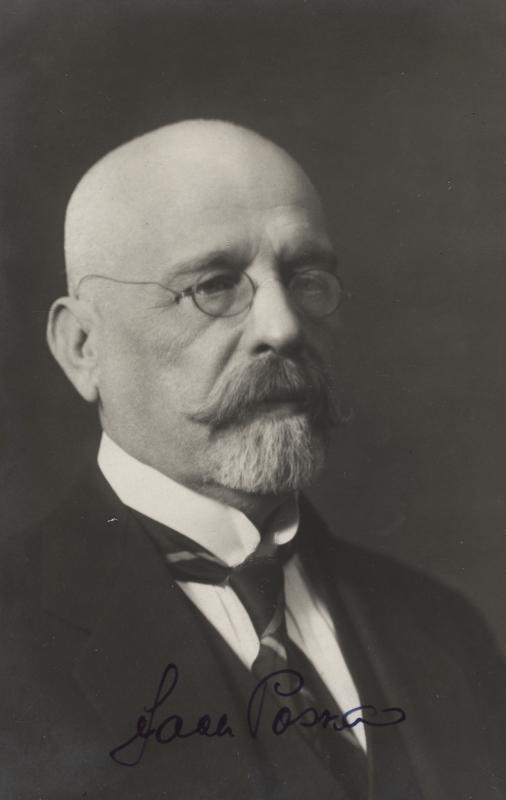
Jaan Poska (1866-1920), the commissar (governor) of the autonomous Estonia (1917)

For most of the time during the rule of Russian Empire 1710–1917, the area of what is now Estonia was divided between two governorates. The Governorate of Estonia in the north corresponded roughly to the area of Danish Estonia, and the northern portion of the Governorate of Livonia, which had a majority of ethnic Estonians. These two areas were amalgamated on 12 April [O.S. 30 March] 1917 by administrative reforms of the Russian Provisional Government.

Free multi-party elections for the Provincial Assembly (Maapäev) were held in May–June 1917. On 5 November 1917, two days before the Bolshevik coup in Petrograd (Saint Petersburg), local Bolsheviks led by Jaan Anvelt and supported by pro-Soviet Russian soldiers and sailors declared themselves the new government in Tallinn (Reval), and attempted to usurp political power in the governorate from governor Jaan Poska on 9 November. On 28 November [O.S. 15 November] 1917 the Maapäev, refusing to recognize the attempted Bolshevik coup d'état, proclaimed itself to be the only legally elected and constituted authority in Estonia. However, it was soon driven underground by the Bolsheviks.

During the reign of the Soviet Estonian Executive Committee, Ants Dauman, the newly elected mayor of Narva, organized a plebiscite with an intention of removing the town of Narva (including the then suburb of Ivangorod) from the Petrograd Governorate and adding them to the new autonomous governorate, receiving permission for the referendum on 29 November [O.S. 16 November] 1917 from the All-Russian Central Executive Committee. As 80% of the town's population supported joining Estonia in the 23 December [O.S. 10 December] 1917 plebiscite, the Soviet Estonian Executive Committee recognized the new additions to the governorate on 3 January 1918 [O.S. 21 December 1917]. Even though the plebiscite was to determine the administrative boundaries within Soviet Russia and it was organised by the Bolshevik regime, the subsequent governments of independent Estonia implicitly acknowledged the referendum's result, as the entire town of Narva (including the suburb of Ivangorod) became part of the territory of the newly independent Republic of Estonia from 1918 onward.

In February 1918, after the collapse of the peace talks between Soviet Russia and the German Empire, mainland Estonia was occupied by the German Empire's armed forces. On 24 February 1918, one day before German forces entered Tallinn, the Salvation Committee of the Estonian National Council Maapäev emerged from underground and issued the Estonian Declaration of Independence. After the German capitulation had ended World War I, on 11-14 November 1918, the representatives of Germany in Estonia handed over all power to the government of the newly independent Republic of Estonia.

== See also ==
- History of Estonia

== Sources ==
- Baumgart, Winfried (1966). Deutsche Ostpolitik 1918: Von Brest-Litovsk bis zum Ende des Ersten Weltkrieges. Wien: Oldenbourg.
- Hiden, John (1987). The Baltic States and Weimar Ostpolitik. Cambridge: Cambridge University Press.
- Kuldkepp, Mart (2021). "The political choices and outlooks of the Estonian Swedish national minority, 1917-1920" (PDF). National Identities. 23 (4): 409–431.
- Materski, Wojciech (2020). "The Problem of the Demarcation of the Border between Estonia and Russia in 1917-1920" (PDF). Zapiski Historyczne. 85 (4): 89–110.
- O'Connor, Kevin (2003). The History of the Baltic States. Westport: Greenwood Press.
- Rauch, Georg (1974). The Baltic States: The Years of Independence: Estonia, Latvia, Lithuania, 1917-1940. London: Hurst.
- Stone, Norman (1998) [1975]. The Eastern Front, 1914–1917. New York: Penguin Books.
- Sukiennicki, Wiktor (1984). East Central Europe During World War I: From Foreign Domination to National Independence. Boulder: East European Monographs.
