= Timeline of the Estonian War of Independence =

This article covers the timeline of the Estonian War of Independence (1918−1920) and a few key events in the prelude and aftermath of the war.

== Prelude ==
=== 1917 ===
- 12 April (N.S.) (30 March O.S.): The Russian Provisional Government declares the autonomous Governorate of Estonia.
- 12–21 October (N.S.) (30 September – 9 October O.S.): Operation Albion: German forces capture the West Estonian archipelago.
- 5 November (N.S.) (23 October O.S.): October Revolution: The War-Revolutionary Council of Estonia, working under the Soviet Executive Committee of Estonia, takes over power in Tallinn, two days before the revolution in Russia.
- 8 November (N.S.) (26 October O.S.): October Revolution: The Soviet Executive Committee of Estonia declares itself the highest power in Estonia.
- 9 November (N.S.) (27 October O.S.): October Revolution: The Bolshevik "War-Revolutionary Council of Estonia" takes over power from Governor Jaan Poska. Bolshevik power will be limited to larger towns, resulting in a period of dual power in Estonia.
- 28 November (N.S.) (15 November O.S.): The Estonian Provincial Assembly declares itself the sovereign power in Estonia. It will go underground and operate through its Committee of Elders.
- 7 December (N.S.) (24 November O.S.): The Knighthood of Saaremaa declares its independence from Russia and asks for German annexation.
- 13 December (N.S.) (30 November O.S.): The Knighthood of Estonia declares its independence from Russia and asks for German protection.
- 23 December (N.S.) (10 December O.S.):
  - The Knighthood of Livonia declares its independence from Russia and asks for German protection.
  - The town of Narva in the Petrograd Governorate holds a plebiscite and with 80% support, is annexed into the Governorate of Estonia.

=== 1918 ===
- 18 February: Operation Faustschlag: German forces begin an eastward offensive against the Red Army.
- 19 February: Ice Cruise: The Soviet Navy begins its evacuation from Tallinn.
- 20 February: Operation Faustschlag: German forces land on the Estonian mainland.
- 24 February:
  - Ice Cruise: Last Soviet ships evacuate from Tallinn.
  - The Estonian Salvation Committee of the Committee of Elders of the Estonian Provincial Assembly issues the Estonian Declaration of Independence from Soviet Russia.
- 25 February: Operation Faustschlag: German forces capture Tallinn. Germany will not recognize the Estonian Provisional Government and will occupy its territory.
- 3 March: Treaty of Brest-Litovsk: Soviet Russia renounces its claims over Estonia.
- 4 March: Operation Faustschlag: German forces capture the last parts of Estonia from the Red Army.
- 16 June: German authorities arrest Konstantin Päts, the chairman of the Council of Ministers of the underground Estonian Provisional Government.
- 3 November: November Revolution: Beginning of a revolution in the German Empire.
- 8–11 November: A general strike in Tallinn.
- 9 November: November Revolution: Emperor Wilhelm II of Germany abdicates and Germany is declared a republic.
- 10 November: Lieutenant General Adolf von Seckendorff of the German 68th Corps allows the acting chairman of the Council of Ministers Jaan Poska to resume the operations of the Estonian Provincial Assembly and the Estonian Provisional Government.
- 10–11 November: The Central Committee of the Estonian Branches of the Russian Communist Party (Bolsheviks) in Petrograd declares a mobilization of Estonian communists to restore communist power in Estonia.
- 11 November:
  - Germany signs the Armistice of Compiègne, officially ending World War I. The Entente Powers order German forces to remain in the Baltic states indefinitely.
  - The Estonian Provisional Government resumes its operations, headed by minister of foreign affairs and acting chairman of the Council of Ministers Jaan Poska. Chairman of the Council of Ministers Konstantin Päts remains imprisoned in a German internment camp in Poland.
  - The Estonian Provisional Government establishes an irregular army called the Estonian Defense League, headed by Major general Ernst Põdder.
- 11–14 November: German authorities give over all political power to the Estonian Provisional Government.
- 12 November:
  - The newly established Estonian Police takes over power from German forces in Tallinn.
  - The Estonian Provisional Government renews its cabinet composition, leaving Konstantin Päts as both prime minister and minister of internal affairs, even though he remains imprisoned in a German internment camp in Poland.
  - The Estonian Provisional Government establishes a regular army called Estonian People's Force.
  - A workers' demonstration in Tallinn is dispersed by German forces.
  - Many school students in Tartu join the Estonian Defense League in corpore.
- 12–15 November: Tallinn factories elect their workers' councils, setting way for communists to resume their power in Estonia after German retreat.
- 13 November:
  - The All-Russian Central Executive Committee annuls the Treaty of Brest-Litovsk, whereby Soviet Russia renounced its claims over Estonia.
  - Minister of War Andres Larka returns to Tallinn from exile. He starts organizing the newly established Estonian People's Force as its acting chief of staff.
- 15 November: The Central Committee of the Estonian Branches of the Russian Communist Party (Bolsheviks) in Petrograd establishes the Provisional Revolutionary Committee of Estonia, headed by Jaan Anvelt. The committee will organize the reconquest of Estonia.
- 16 November:
  - Soviet westward offensive: The commander-in-chief of the Red Army Jukums Vācietis gives an order to go on a wide offensive from Gulf of Finland to Ukraine, but to avoid confrontations with the retreating German forces.
  - The Estonian Provisional Government declares a mandatory mobilization into the Estonian People's Force for all officers, doctors and military personnel and a voluntary mobilization for men aged 21–25.
- 16–19 November: In Riga, an Estonian Provisional Government delegation is in negotiations with the General Plenipotentiary of Germany to the Baltic states August Winning.
- 17 November:
  - Soviet westward offensive: The Red Army begins its offensive stretching from the Gulf of Finland to Ukraine.
  - Prime Minister and Minister of Internal Affairs Konstantin Päts is released from a German internment camp near Grodno, Poland (now Belarus).
- 18 November:
  - The Republic of Latvia declares independence from Soviet Russia.
  - Soviet westward offensive:
    - The commander-in-chief of the Red Army Jukums Vācietis gives an order to go on an offensive towards Pskov and thereafter towards Valga/Valka–Cēsis–Riga. The offensive will begin on 25 November.
    - First Red Army units invade Latvia, marking the beginning of the Latvian War of Independence.
- 19 November:
  - At Riga, the Estonian Provisional Government and the General Plenipotentiary of Germany to the Baltic states August Winning sign a treaty, whereby Germany officially gives over power in Estonia and recognizes the sovereignty of the Estonian Provisional Government over Estonia, but falls short on recognizing Estonian independence. The treaty will come into effect on 21 November.
  - The Estonian Provisional Government restores the legal order as was in effect on 6 November (N.S.) (24 October O.S.), before the October Revolution in the autonomous Governorate of Estonia.
  - The Tallinn Workers' and Soldiers' Council asks Soviet Russia to intervene to fight against the bourgeoisie and international imperialists.
- 20 November:
  - The Estonian Provincial Assembly convenes for the first time after the German occupation.
  - Prime Minister and Minister of Internal Affairs Konstantin Päts returns to Tallinn from a German internment camp in Poland.
  - The Estonian Provisional Government asks the United Kingdom to send a Royal Navy fleet to Estonian waters. The British Under-Secretary of State for Foreign Affairs Robert Cecil declares its support for Estonia and promises to provide military assistance.
- 21 November:
  - The treaty signed on 19 November between the Estonian Provisional Government and the General Plenipotentiary of Germany to the Baltic states August Winning on giving over power in Estonia comes into effect. German forces give over official power to the Estonian Provisional Government and the Estonian Provincial Assembly. This marks the end of the German occupation of Estonia during World War I.
  - The Estonian Provisional Government establishes the 1st Division of the Estonian People's Force, commanded by Major General Aleksander Tõnisson. It consists of the:
    - 1st Infantry Regiment in Tallinn, commanded by Major General Ernst Põdder;
    - 2nd Infantry Regiment in Tartu, commanded by Colonel Johan Unt;
    - 3rd Infantry Regiment in Võru, commanded by Lieutenant Colonel Eduard-Alfred Kubbo;
    - 4th Infantry Regiment in Narva, commanded by Colonel Aleksander Seiman;
    - 5th Infantry Regiment in Rakvere, commanded by Lieutenant Colonel Nikolai Reek;
    - 6th Infantry Regiment in Pärnu, commanded by Lieutenant Colonel Juhan Puskar;
    - 1st Artillery Regiment in Tallinn, commanded by Captain Hugo Eduard Kauler;
    - Cavalry Regiment in Tallinn, commanded by Captain Gustav Jonson;
    - Engineers Battalion in Nõmme, commanded by Captain Nikolai Peterson.
- 22 November: Soviet westward offensive: Red Army's 6th Guards Division of the 7th Army of the Northern Front tries to capture Narva, but is repelled by German forces.
- 23 November: The Estonian Provisional Government sends deputy prime minister and minister of courts Jaan Poska and minister without portfolio Jaan Tõnisson to Finland to acquire weapons and an external loan.
- 25 November: Soviet westward offensive: Red Army's Western Front goes on an offensive towards Pskov, forcing the German forces to retreat. A communist revolt in the town forces the Russian White Northern Corps to retreat as well, mostly in disarray, while only Stanisław Bułak-Bałachowicz's cavalry regiment manages to retreat in formation.
- 26 November:
  - Major General Andres Larka is appointed Chief of Staff of the Estonian People's Force.
  - Soviet westward offensive: Red Army captures Pskov.
  - The Estonian Provisional Government sends a delegation to Sweden to seek military assistance.
  - The Estonian Provisional Government signs a treaty with the Estonian Knighthood and Saaremaa and other Baltic German organizations to repel the advance of the Red Army.
- 27 November:
  - The Estonian Provisional Government renews its cabinet composition, retaining Konstantin Päts as prime minister, but also naming him the minister of war.
  - In accordance with the treaty between the Estonian Provisional Government and Baltic German organizations signed on 26 November, the Baltic German "Baltic Battalion" is established, headed by Colonel Constantin von Weiss. A voluntary mobilization of Baltic Germans aged 18–45 is declared.
- 28 November: The Red Army attacks Narva, now guarded by Estonians, and take it the following day, starting the Estonian War of Independence.

== See also ==
- Estonian War of Independence
- Timeline of Estonian history
