= Capture of Tapa =

Battle in Estonia in 1919

- Part of the Estonian War of Independence
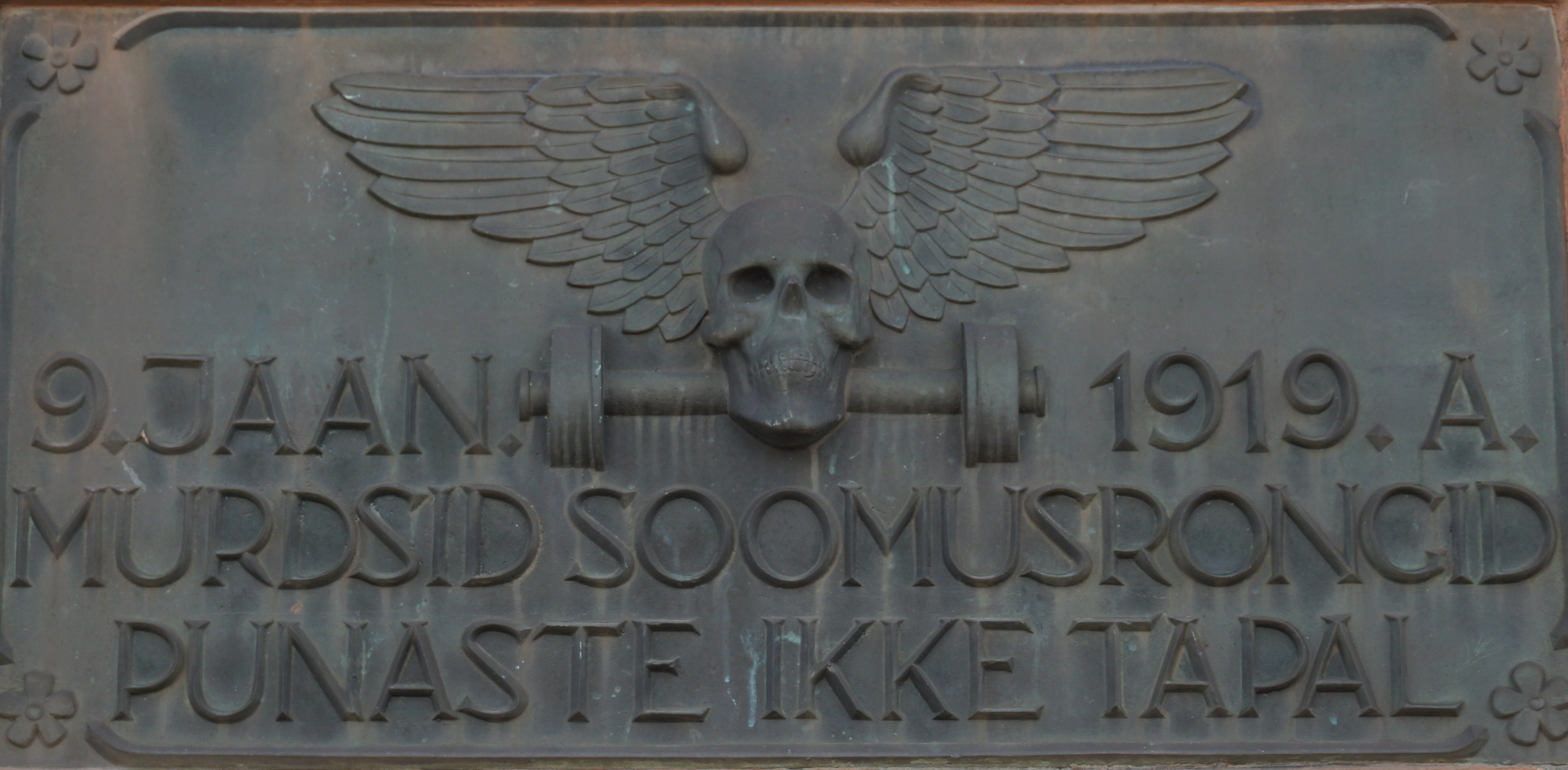
- Plaque commemorating actions made by the armored trains and its men in the Capture of Tapa at the Tapa railway station.
Date	9 January 1919
Location	Tapa, Estonia 59°16′N 25°57′E
Result	Estonian victory

Belligerents
Estonia	Russia

Commanders and leaders
Karl Parts	Jaan Anvelt

Strength
448 men 48 machine guns 5 cannons 3 armored trains	Unknown

Casualties and losses
4 wounded	~100 dead 78 captured

The Capture of Tapa (Estonian: Tapa vallutamine), sometimes known as the Battle of Tapa (Estonian: Tapa lahing), took place on 9 January 1919 in Tapa, Estonia, between troops of the Russian Red Army and Estonia. The goal of the Estonian troops was to capture and liberate the Tapa Railway Station from occupation by Russia. Three armored trains (soomusrong) were used in the engagement, led by Captain Anton Irv, Captain Oskar Luiga, and Captain Jaan Lepp.

== Background ==
On 28 November 1918, the Red Army fought against the Estonian and German troops and captured Narva. The Red Army continued to capture northeastern and southeastern Estonian territory. On the Christmas Eve of 1918, the 6th Red Rifle Division captured Tapa and its railway junction. Russian troops reached within 34 kilometers of Tallinn, Estonia. Estonian troops strengthened and advanced to liberate Soviet-occupied territory. The Red Army's advances were halted by the Estonian Army between the 2nd and 5th of January 1919, and the Estonian army continued the counter-offensive on January 7. On 9 January the Estonian Army attempted a liberation of Tapa.

== Course of the Battle ==
On 6 January 1919, A counter-offensive and an order for armored trains 1, 2, and 3 to capture the Tapa railway on 7 January was made. The order was postponed due to destroyed bridges leading towards Lehtse.

=== First Attempt ===
On the morning of 8 January 1919, three Estonian armored trains, numbers 1, 2 and 3, left Lehtse to travel to Tapa. Infantry of the Red Army was positioned near Pruuna Manor, near the village of Pruuna. Soldiers from the armored trains advanced towards Pruuna Manor, and captured the manor 30 minutes later. Russian machine guns, horses, and around 9 soldiers were captured. A bridge leading towards Tapa was destroyed, delaying the initial battle until January 9th.

=== Battle ===
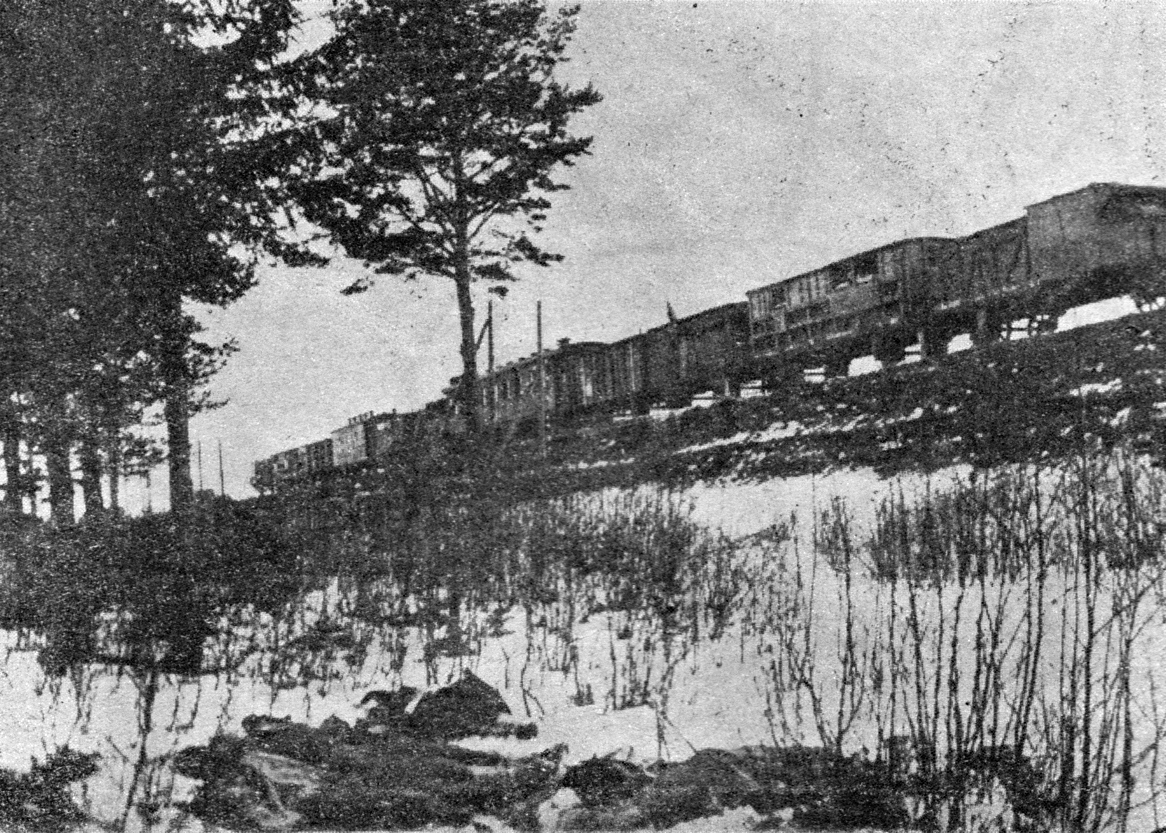
Armored Train nr. 1 (Later named "Kapten Irw") during the Capture of Tapa

Around 5 in the morning on 8 January 1919, three Estonian armored trains, numbers 1, 2 and 3, left Lehtse to travel to Tapa. Armored train nr. 4 remained at Lehtse to protect the train station. A surprise attack was planned by the Estonian troops, but the railway needed to be repaired further.

Around 7 a.m., while soldiers from the Estonian armored trains advanced towards Tapa, soldiers of the Red Army opened fire in the direction of the armored trains. The Estonian soldiers returned fire and took cover. Around 7:30 a.m., the Estonian soldiers continued to advance towards Tapa. Soldiers of the Red Army began to retreat towards a wooded area. The Red Army soldiers continued running into a field.

The firefight continued into Tapa, with Red Army soldiers defending the town. Armored trains were able to advance closer to Tapa due to repairs on the railway. Soldiers of the Red Army took cover in buildings of the town due to artillery being fired from the armored trains, while Estonian soldiers advanced into Tapa. Red Army soldiers retreated in the direction of the Valgejõgi river. Tapa was captured by the Estonians.

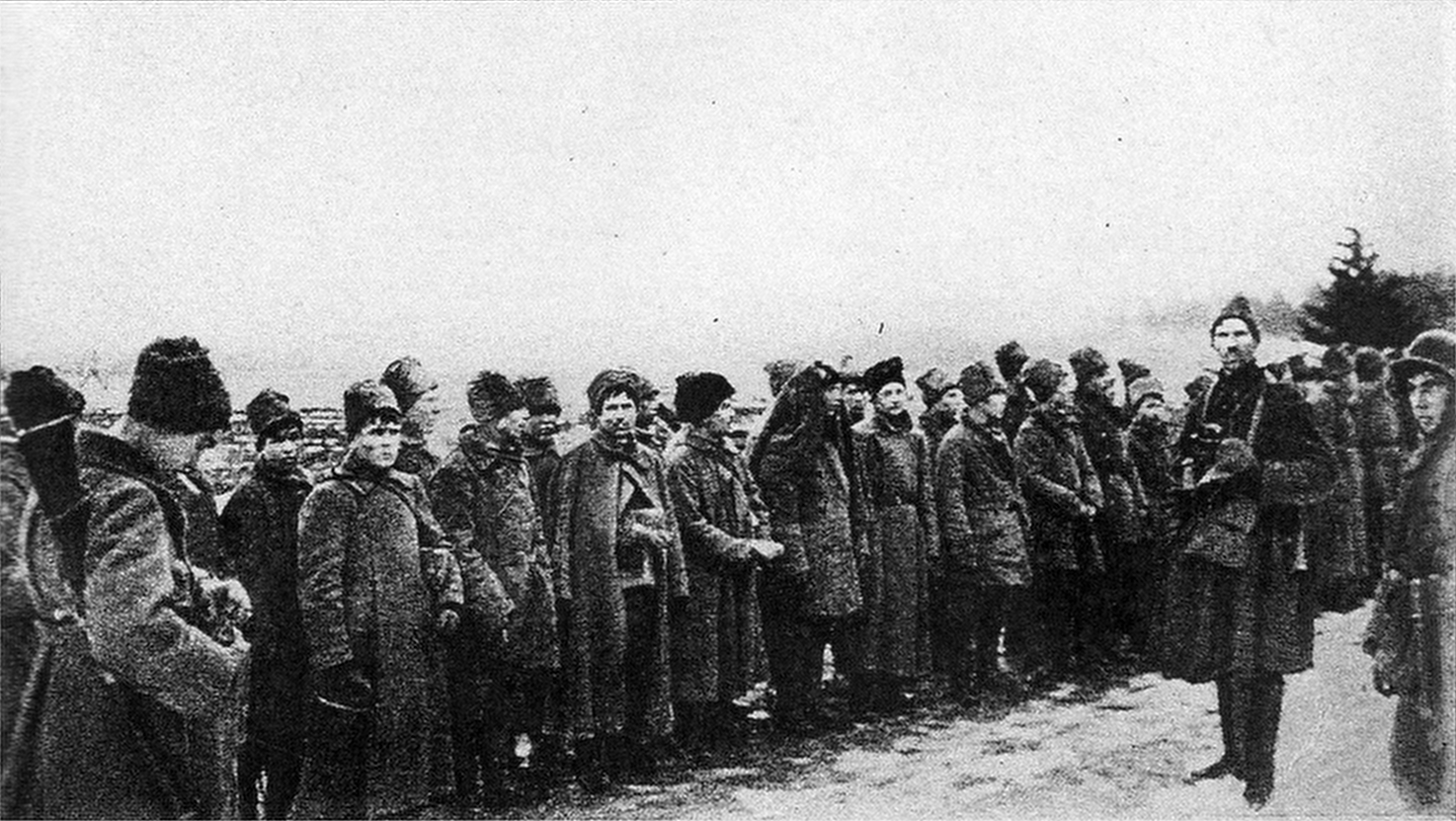
Russian Prisoners of War taken during the Capture of Tapa, Karl Parts (right) is holding binoculars

Estonian soldiers advanced toward the Valgejõgi river, capturing Red Army soldiers. A Red Army armored train fought against the advancing Estonian soldiers.

Estonian armored train no. 1 attacked a group of Red Army soldiers, and captured 40 Red Army soldiers.

== Outcome ==
Estonian losses was only 4 injured with no deaths, while the Red Army was at least 100 fallen and 78 captured. Tapa was captured by the Estonian army, giving the control of the strategically important Tapa railway to the Estonians, due to the railway providing rail access to major Estonian cities (Such as the country's capital, Tallinn, Narva, and Tartu), places in Latvia, and places in Russia. The capture of the town would be important for further use of armored trains in later battles of the Independence War.

== Commemorative Plaque ==
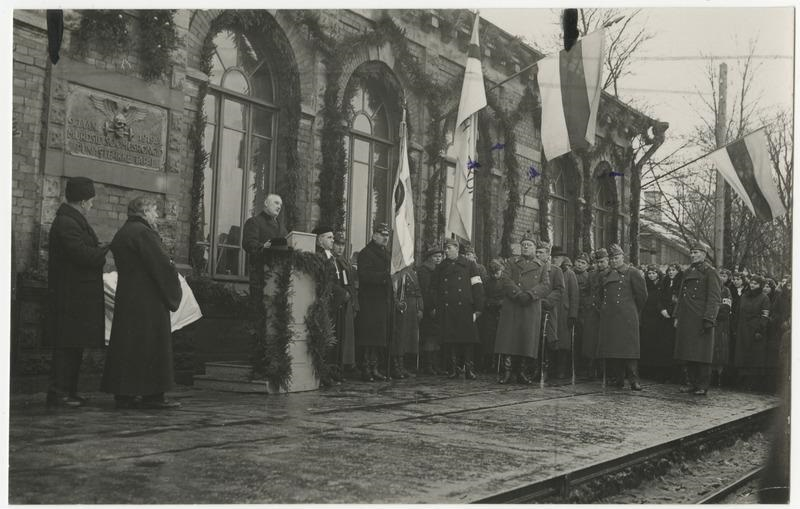
The plaque being unveiled on the Tapa Railway Station building by Johan Laidoner, in 1934.

In 1934, a commemorative plaque was unveiled at the Tapa Railway Station for the 15th Anniversary of the Capture of Tapa. The plaque was unveiled on January 9, 1934, by Johan Laidoner. The plaque reads "9. Jaan 1919, murdsid soomusrongid punaste ikke Tapal" (English: On January 9, 1919, the men of the Armored trains broke through the Reds and captured Tapa").
