= German occupation of Estonia =

German occupation of Estonia may refer to:

- German occupation of Estonia during World War I
- German occupation of Estonia during World War II
