= Mothander =

Mothander is a surname. Notable people with the name include:

- Bell (singer) (born Bell Mothander; 2000), Swedish singer
- Bo Mothander, Swedish figure skater
- Carl Axel Mothander (1886–1965), Swedish soldier
- Ingela Agardh (née Mothander; 1948–2008), Swedish journalist
