= Estonian Declaration of Independence =

1918 founding act of the Republic of Estonia

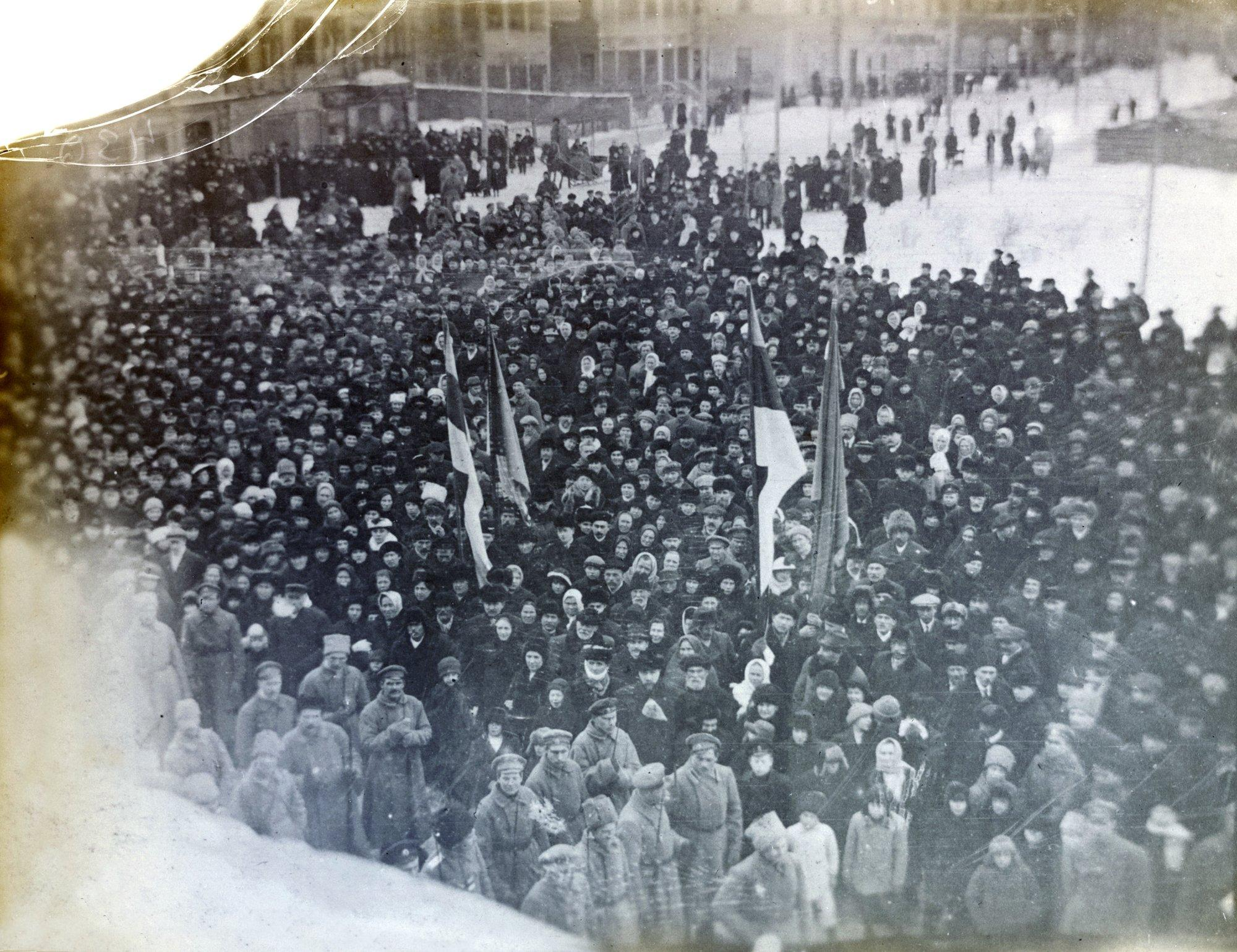
The first proclamation of Estonia's Declaration of Independence, on 23 February 1918 in Pärnu

The Estonian Declaration of Independence, also known as the Manifesto to the Peoples of Estonia (Estonian: Manifest Eestimaa rahvastele), is the founding act which established the independent democratic Republic of Estonia on 24 February 1918. Since then, 24 February has been celebrated as Estonian Independence Day, the national day of Estonia.

== Historical context ==
The declaration was drafted by the Salvation Committee elected by the elders of the Estonian Provincial Assembly and consisting of Konstantin Päts, Jüri Vilms and Konstantin Konik. Originally intended to be proclaimed on 21 February 1918, the proclamation was delayed until the evening of 23 February, when the manifesto was printed and read out aloud publicly in Pärnu. On the next day, 24 February 1918, the manifesto was printed and distributed in the capital, Tallinn (Reval).

During World War I, on 24 February 1918, in the capital city Tallinn, between the retreating Russian bolshevik troops and the advancing German army (and the nearing occupation by the German Empire), the Estonian Salvation Committee — the executive body of the democratically elected Provincial Assembly (Maapäev) — declared the independence of Estonia. The declaration was made in the main hall of the local branch of the State Bank of the Russian Empire (subsequently part of the head office of Bank of Estonia).

The German Empire did not recognise the newly declared "democratic republic of Estonia". However, after the defeat of the Central Powers in World War I in November 1918, Germany withdrew its troops from Estonia, and formally handed power in Estonia over to the Estonian Provisional Government on 19 November 1918. The Russian Bolshevik invasion and the Estonian War of Independence followed. On 2 February 1920, the Tartu Peace Treaty was signed by the Republic of Estonia and Bolshevik Russia. The Republic of Estonia obtained international recognition and became a member of the League of Nations in 1921.

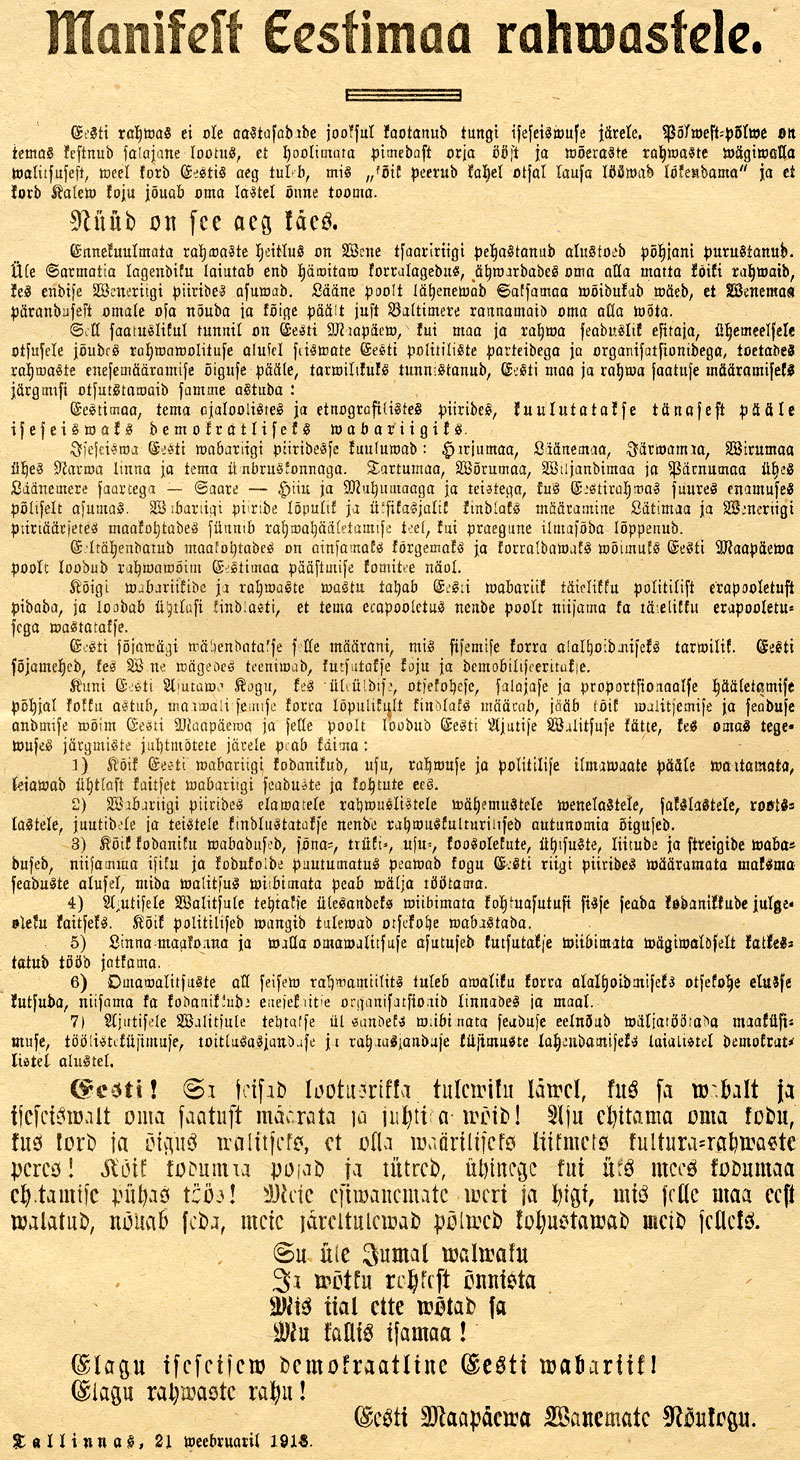
Estonian Declaration of Independence

== See also ==
- Independence Day (Estonia)
- Estonian War of Independence
- Estonian Sovereignty Declaration
