= Jüri Vilms =

Estonian politician (1889–1918)

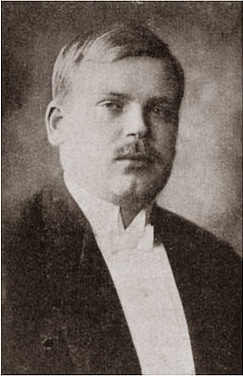
- Jüri Vilms

Jüri Vilms (13 March [O.S. 1 March] 1889, Arkma, Kabala Parish (now Türi Parish), Kreis Fellin, Governorate of Livonia – May 2, 1918, Hauho near Hämeenlinna, Finland, place unconfirmed) was a member of the Estonian Salvation Committee and the first Deputy Prime Minister of the Republic of Estonia. Empowered by Maapäev, the Salvation Committee issued the Estonian Declaration of Independence on 24 February 1918 in the middle of a political power vacuum created by the retreating Russian and advancing German troops during World War I. The German forces taking over the country did not recognize the independence of Estonia. The Salvation Committee went underground and Jüri Vilms volunteered to go to Finland to take funds and instructions to the Estonian missions working to get diplomatic recognition for the newly sovereign nation. According to an "official" version, he was captured on reaching the Finnish coast and executed by German troops in Helsinki. According to the latest research Jüri Vilms may have been executed by a unit of the Swedish Brigade in Hauho. Estonia gained its independence after the German troops were withdrawn from Estonia due to the German Revolution and the ensuing Estonian War of Independence ended with Peace Treaty of Tartu.

Jüri Vilms was born in Kabala, now in Türi Parish, Järva County. He studied at Pärnu Gymnasium where he qualified for free tuition due to a high grade point average. After graduating Vilms continued his studies at the University of Tartu Faculty of Law 1907–1911. At the University he became a member of the Estonian Students Association where he was chosen to the position of elected chairman. In 1911 Vilms started to practise as a lawyer, first as an associate, and later opening his own law firm. After the beginning of World War I Vilms became involved with the Estonian National Movement, publishing articles demanding autonomy for Estonia within the Russian Empire. He criticized the political concepts of Jaan Tõnisson who advocated the idea of cultural autonomy only and the ideas of Konstantin Päts who saw political opportunities in cooperating with Baltic Germans in Estonia. In 1917 Vilms founded a new political party in Estonia, the left-of-centre Eesti Tööerakond (Estonian Labour Party).

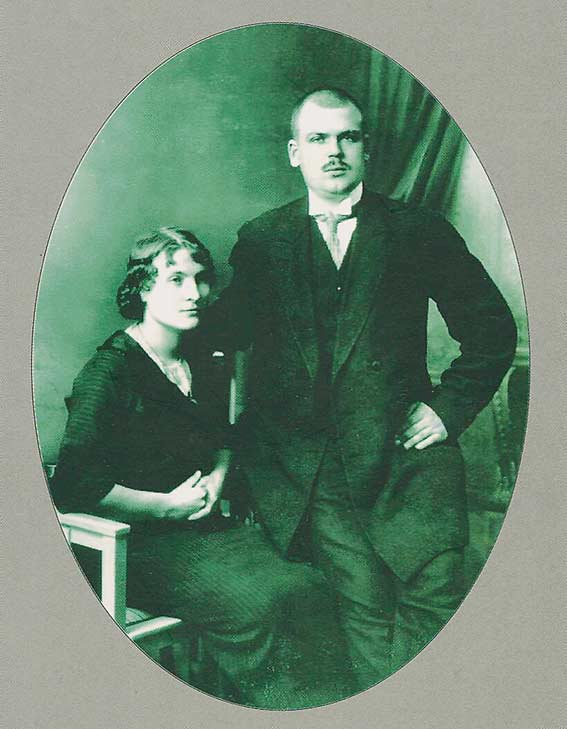
Jüri Vilms with Marie Oberst, his colleague from University of Tartu

After the Russian February Revolution Jüri Vilms became a full-time politician. He was labelled as the advocate of the Estonian people by Aleksander Looring at the time. Together with Heinrich Koppel, Otto Strandman and Jaan Raamot the legal preparations for the administrative reforms establishing the Autonomous Governorate of Estonia were compiled. The documents became the basis for the decree of the Russian Provisional Government on 30 March [O.S. 17 March] 1917 establishing the autonomy for Estonia.

Juri Vilms has been characterized by Jaan Kross in his historical novel Tabamatus, translated into Swedish Motstånd, Finnish Kuningasajatus and French Dans l’insaisissable.

== See also ==
- List of unsolved deaths

== Books ==
- Kuusela, Kari (2015), Jüri Vilmsin mysteeri. In: Nieminen, J. (ed.) Helsinki ensimmäisessä maailmansodassa, pp. 42–43, Helsinki: Gummerus Kustannus Oy, ISBN 978-951-24-0086-7
