= Karl Parts =

Estonian military commander

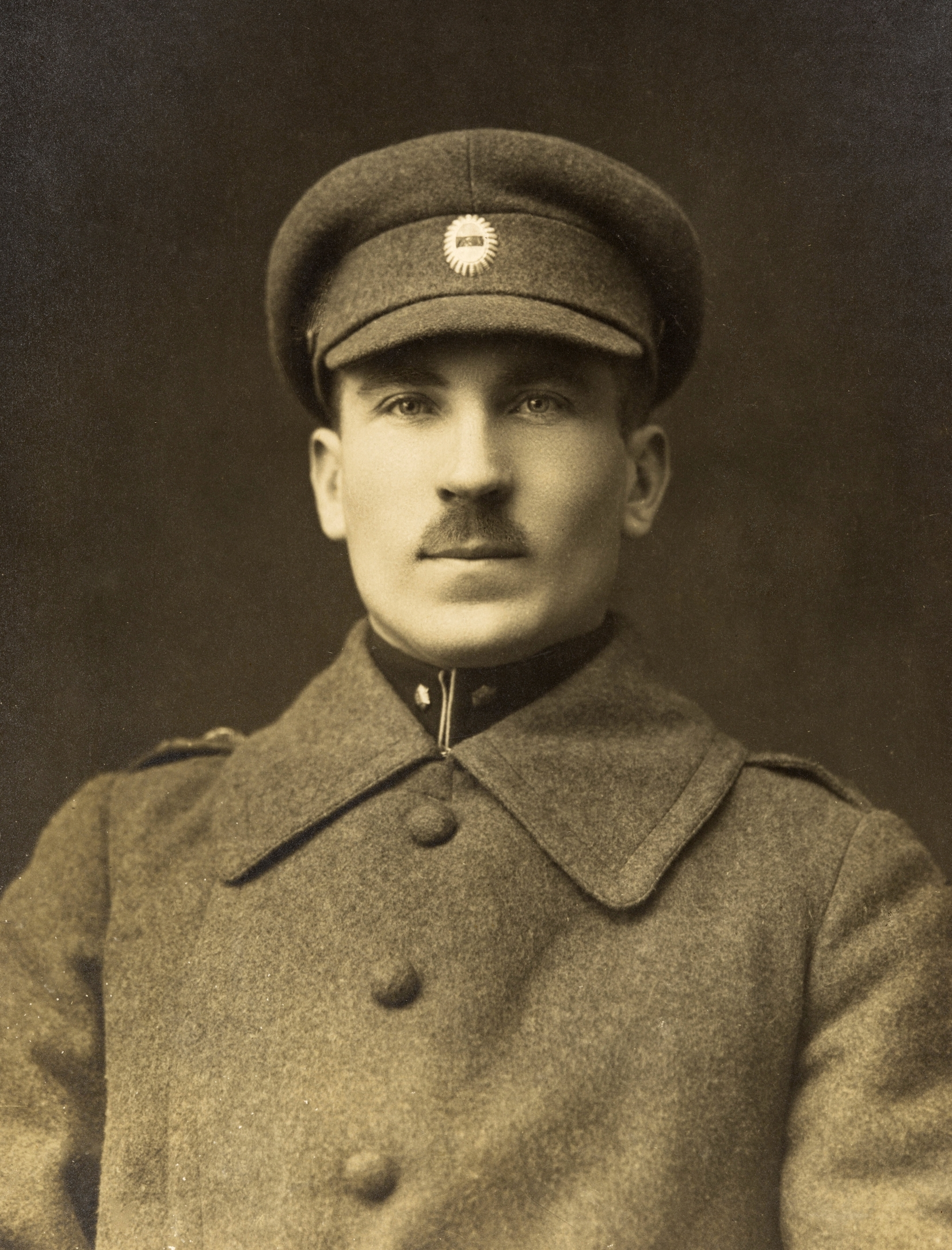
- Born: 15 July 1886; Palupera Parish, Estonia
- Died: 1 September 1941 (aged 55); Kirov, Soviet Union
- Military career
- Allegiance: Russian Empire; Estonia
- Branch: Estonia
- Service years: 1914–1917 (Russia); 1918–1925 (Estonia)
- Rank: Colonel
- Unit: Estonian Army
- Conflicts: World War I Estonian War of Independence
- Awards: Cross of Liberty
- Other work: Farmer

Karl Parts VR I/1, VR II/2, VR II/3 (15 July 1886 in Palupera Parish, Estonia – 1 September 1941 in Kirov, Soviet Union) was an Estonian military commander during the Estonian War of Independence.

In 1915, he graduated from Peterhof Military School, and participated in World War I. In July 1917, Parts joined the Estonian national units. During the German occupation in 1918, he organized the underground Estonian Defence League. In the Estonian Liberation War, Karl Parts led and organized the armoured trains, and in December 1918, became the commander of the Armoured Trains Division. He commanded in the biggest armoured conflict of war that resulted in the capture of Pskov. After the war, Parts served as commander of the Armoured Trains Brigade from 1921 to 1923, and later as inspector. He actively participated in defeating the 1924 coup attempt. In 1925, he retired and became a farmer. In 1940, Soviet occupation authorities arrested Parts, and he was shot in imprisonment the year after. Six weeks before his death, a Soviet destruction battalion doused his son Emil-Mauritius (1912–1941) with acid and killed him.

== See also ==
- Estonian War of Independence
- Freikorps in the Baltic
