= Estonian War of Independence =

War between Estonia and Soviet Russia in 1918–1920

- Part of Aftermath of World War I, Russian Civil War, Latvian War of Independence and Heimosodat
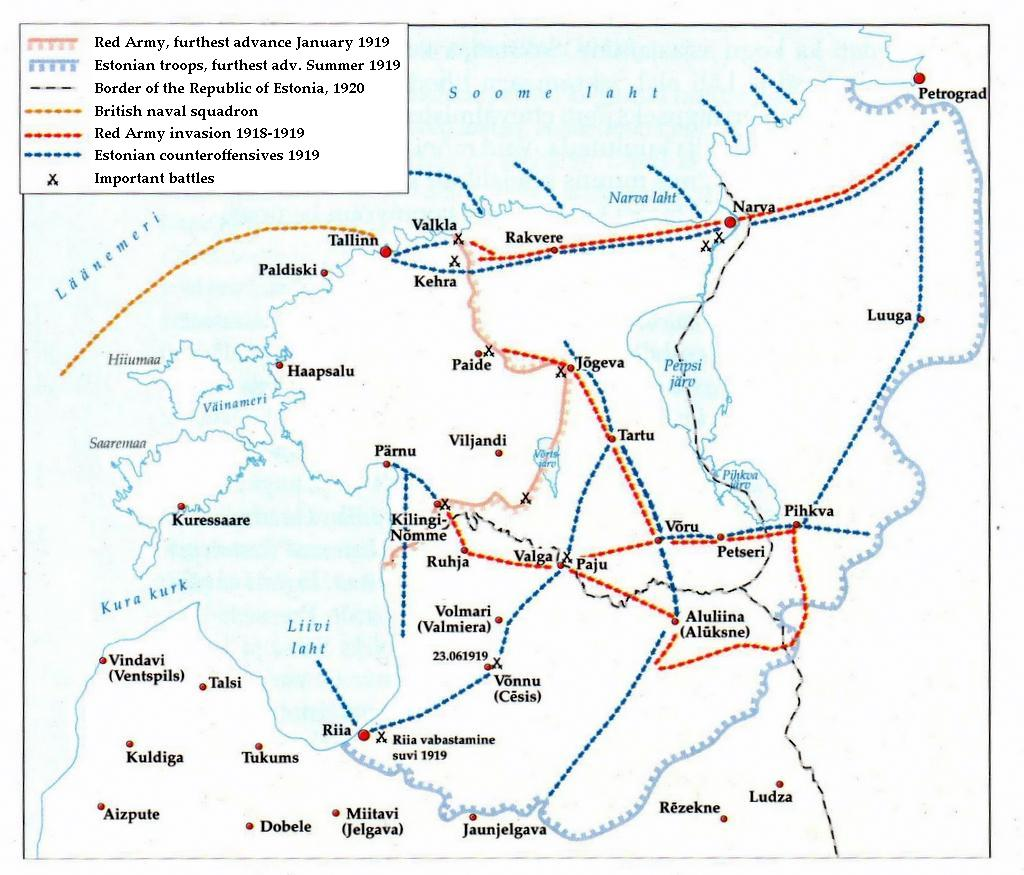
Date	28 November 1918 – 2 February 1920 (1 year, 2 months and 5 days)
Location	Estonia, Latvia, Northwestern Russia
Result	Estonian victory: Treaty of Tartu; Expulsion of the Red Army from Estonia
Territorial changes	Estonia gains independence

Belligerents
Estonia; Finnish, Danish, and Swedish volunteers; (Latvia) North Latvian Brigade; (Russia) White Movement; United Kingdom (Note: Naval support)	Soviet Russia; Commune of Estonia; Soviet Latvia	Landeswehr; Freikorps

Commanders and leaders
(Estonia) Konstantin Päts (Estonia) Otto Strandman (Estonia) Jaan Tõnisson (Estonia) Johan Laidoner (Estonia) Jaan Soots (Russia) Nikolai Yudenich	(Russian Soviet Federative Socialist Republic) Vladimir Lenin (Russian Soviet Federative Socialist Republic) Leon Trotsky (Russian Soviet Federative Socialist Republic) Jukums Vācietis (Russian Soviet Federative Socialist Republic) Sergey Kamenev (Russian Soviet Federative Socialist Republic) Dmitry Nadyozhny (Russian Soviet Federative Socialist Republic) Vladimir Gittis	(German Empire) Rüdiger von der Goltz (German Empire) Alfred Fletcher

Strength
7 January 1919: 4,450–16,500 Including: (Estonia) 14,500 Estonian national guard + Estonian army (in process of formation); 6th Light Cruiser Squadron of the Royal Navy; (Finland) 2,000 Finnish volunteers + respective number of Finnish officers, Baltic German forces (Note: Although many Baltic Germans fought against the Republic of Estonia as part of the Baltische Landeswehr, one regiment originally formed by ethnic German students fought as part of the Estonian Army until 1920, when it was disbanded.); May 1919: 86,000 Including: (Estonia) Estonian army (74,500); (Russia) Northern Corps (2,750); (Latvia) North Latvian Brigade (1,500); Baltic Battalion (900); Ingrian Battalion; Swedish/Danish volunteer companies; 1st Light Cruiser Squadron	7 January 1919: 5,750–7,250; 26 assault guns 3 armoured cars 1 armoured train 141 machine guns May 1919: 80,000	June 1919: 20,000

Casualties and losses
3,588 killed 15,000 injured	Unknown; 10,000 captured	400 killed 1,500 wounded

The Estonian War of Independence, also known as the Estonian Liberation War, and War of Freedom (Note: Estonian: Vabadussõda) in Estonia, was a defensive campaign of the Estonian Army and its allies, most notably the United Kingdom and Finland, against the Soviet Russian westward offensive of 1918–1919 and the 1919 aggression of the pro–German Baltische Landeswehr. The campaign was the struggle of the newly established democratic state of Estonia for independence in the aftermath of World War I. It resulted in a victory for Estonia and was concluded in the 1920 Treaty of Tartu.

== Preface ==
During the 1917 Russian Revolution, the newly elected provincial legislature (State Diet or Maapäev) of the Autonomous Governorate of Estonia proclaimed itself the highest sovereign authority in Estonia, instead of the new Bolshevik government of Russia. As a result, the local Bolsheviks soon dissolved the Maapäev and temporarily forced the democratically elected Estonian leadership underground in the capital Tallinn. A few months later, in February 1918, using the interval between the Red Army's retreat and the arrival of the Imperial German Army, the Salvation Committee formed by Maapäev issued the Estonian Declaration of Independence in Tallinn on 24 February 1918 and formed the Estonian Provisional Government. This first period of independence was extremely short-lived, as the German troops entered Tallinn the following day. The German authorities recognized neither the provisional government nor its claim for the independence of Estonia.

After the German Revolution with the capitulation of Imperial Germany at the end of World War I, 11–14 November 1918, the representatives of Germany formally handed over political power to the Estonian Provisional Government. On 16 November 1918, the provisional government called for voluntary mobilization and began to organize the Estonian armed forces, with Konstantin Päts as Minister of War, major general Andres Larka as the chief of staff, and major general Aleksander Tõnisson as commander of the Estonian army, initially consisting of one division.

== Course of the war ==
=== Soviet westward offensive ===
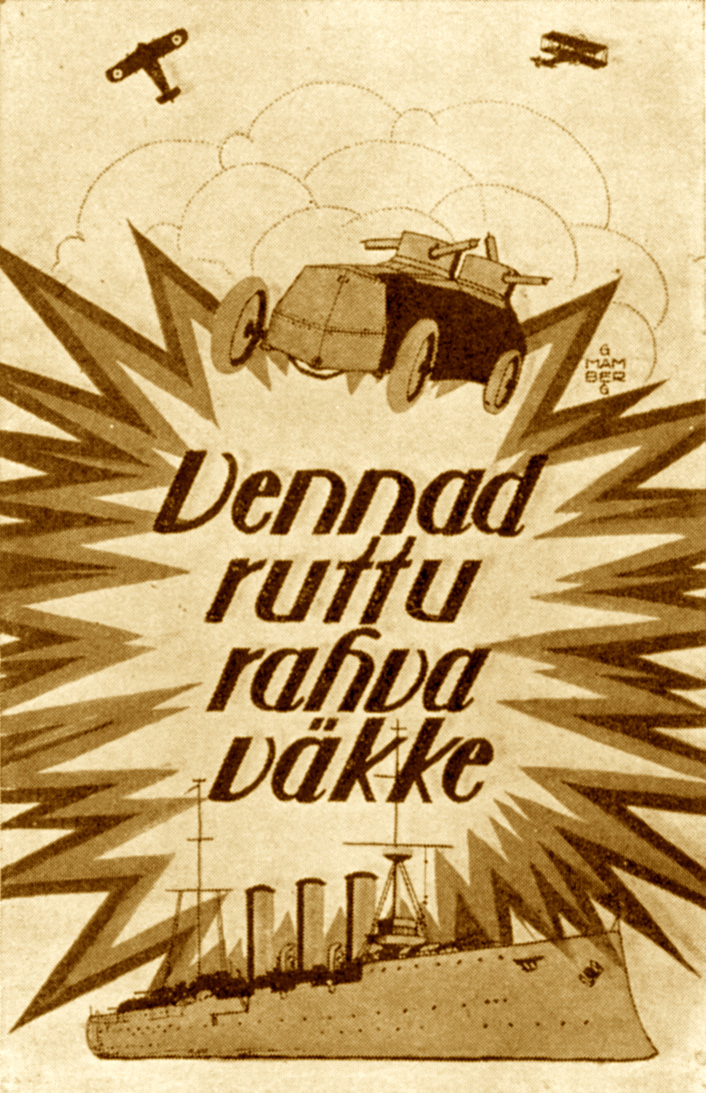
"Brothers, Hurry to Join the Nation's Army!" Estonian Army Recruiting poster in 1918

In late November 1918, the Bolshevik Soviet Russian armed forces moved against Estonia. On 28 November 1918, the Soviet 6th Red Rifle Division attacked the border town of Narva, marking the beginning of the Estonian War of Independence.

The Soviet 6th Red Rifle Division attacked with 7,000 infantry, 22 field guns, 111 machine guns, an armored train, two armored vehicles, two airplanes, and the Bogatyr class cruiser Oleg supported by two destroyers. The city was defended by men of the Estonian Defence League (Home Guard) (consisting partly of secondary school students) and Infanterie-Regiment Nr. 405 of the German Army. The Reds captured Narva on 29 November and the Infanterie-Regiment Nr. 405 withdrew westwards.

The Soviet 2nd Novgorod Division opened a second front south of Lake Peipus, with 7,000 infantry, 12 field guns, 50 machine guns, two armored trains, and three armored vehicles.

Estonian military forces at the time consisted of 2,000 men with light weapons and about 14,500 poorly armed men in the Estonian Defence League. The end of November 1918 saw the formation of the Baltic Battalion, primarily a mounted machine-gun company plus infantry. Estonia's Baltic German minority provided a sizable troop of volunteer militia for the Battalion, which was one of the first fighting units of the Estonian Army, and maintained staunch loyalty to the authority of the Republic.

The 49th Red Latvian Riflemen Regiment took the Valga railway junction on 18 December and the city of Tartu on Christmas Eve. Also on Christmas Eve, the 6th Red Rifle Division captured the Tapa railway junction, advancing to within 34 kilometers of the nation's capital Tallinn. Estonian Bolsheviks declared the Estonian Workers' Commune in Narva.

By the end of the year, the 7th Red Army controlled Estonia along the front line 34 kilometers east of Tallinn, west from Tartu and south of Ainaži.

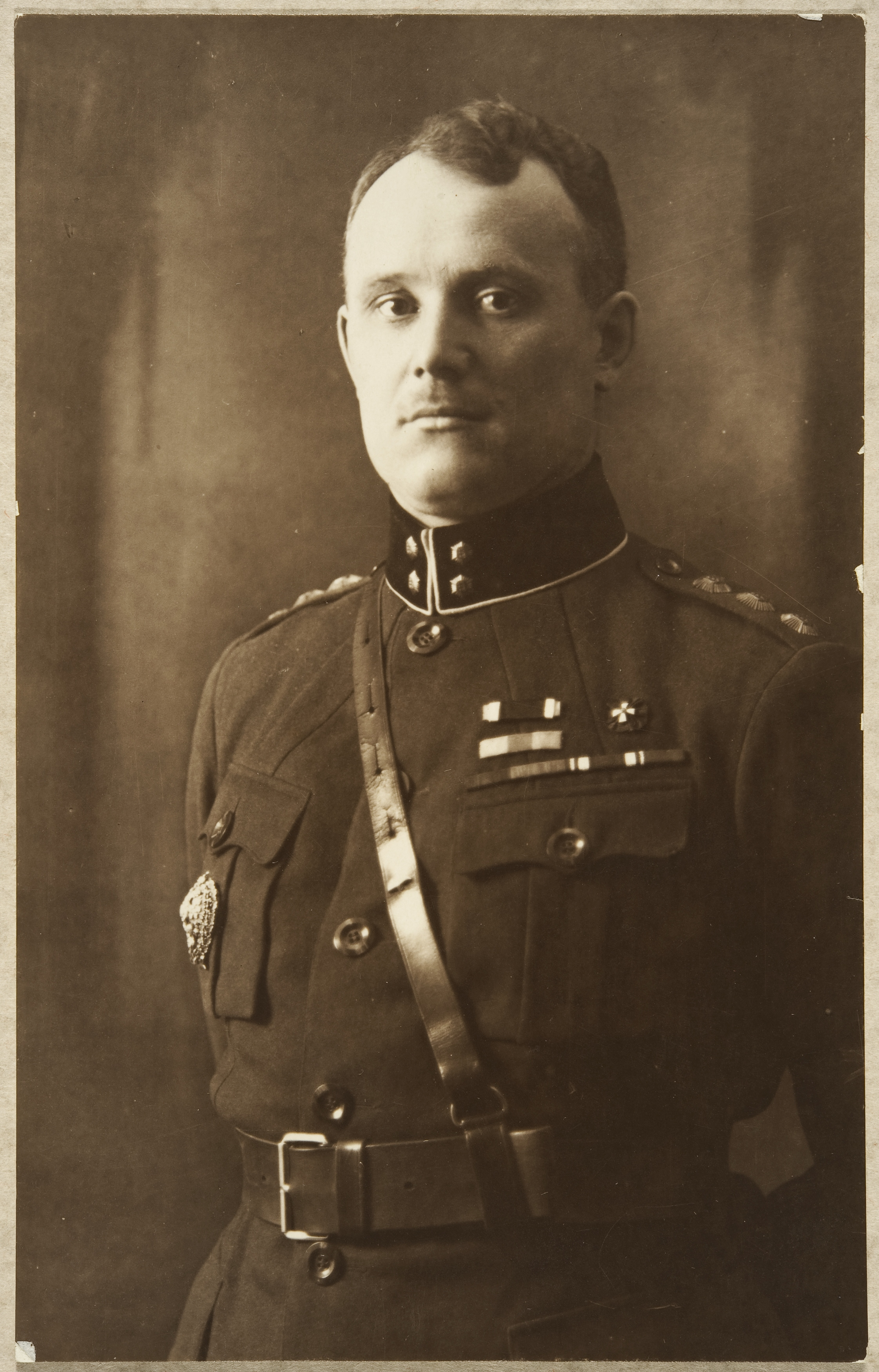
General Laidoner during the War of Independence

Colonel Johan Laidoner was appointed Commander in chief of the Estonian armed forces. He recruited 600 officers and 11,000 volunteers by 23 December 1918.

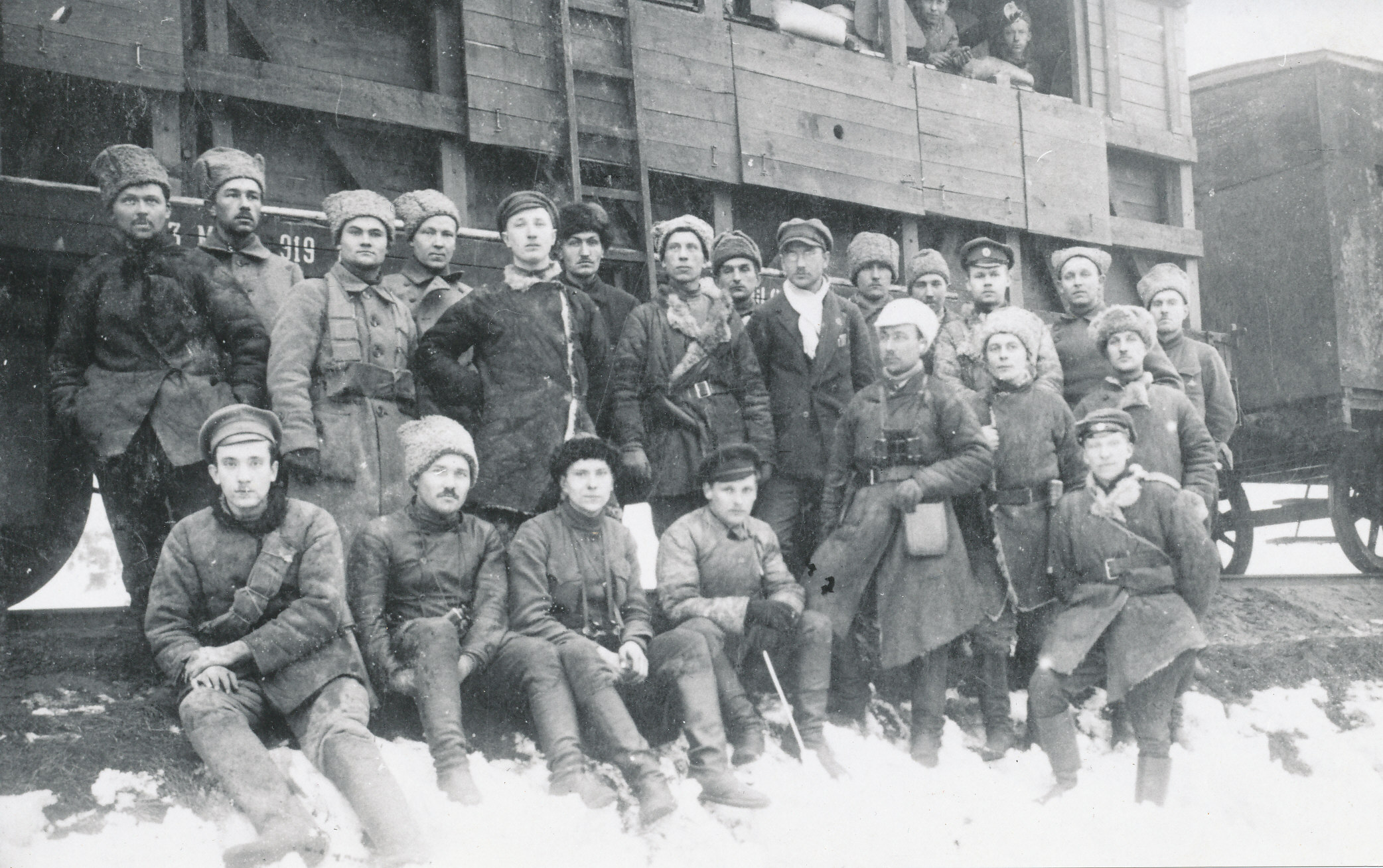
Officers of Estonian armoured train nr 1 in December 1918

He reorganized the forces by setting up the 2nd Division in Southern Estonia under the command of Colonel Viktor Puskar, along with commando units, such as the Tartumaa Partisan Battalion and the Kalevi Malev Battalion.

The national government obtained foreign assistance. On 5 December, Finland delivered 5,000 rifles and 20 field guns along with ammunition.

A British Royal Navy squadron commanded by Rear Admiral Sir Edwyn Alexander-Sinclair arrived at Tallinn on 31 December and delivered 6,500 rifles, 200 machine guns, and two field guns. The squadron captured two Russian destroyers, Spartak and Avtroil, and turned them over to Estonia, which renamed them Vambola and Lennuk.

On 2 January, Finnish volunteer units with 2,000 men arrived in Estonia. Three armored trains were built in Tallinn under the command of sea captain Johan Pitka and Captain Karl Parts.

=== Liberation of Estonian territory ===
The first celebration of Estonian Independence Day in Tallinn on 24 February 1919

By the beginning of 1919, the Estonian Army had increased its ranks to a total of 13,000 men, with 5,700 on the front facing 8,000 Soviets. The strengthened Estonian Army stopped the 7th Red Army's advance in its tracks between 2 and 5 January 1919 and went on the counter-offensive on 7 January.

Tapa was liberated two days later in a campaign highlighted by the implementation of the highly successful "soomusrongid" (armoured trains). This turn of events was swiftly followed by the liberation of the sizable town of Rakvere on 12 January.

In liberating Narva, a 1,000-strong Finnish-Estonian force landed at Utria to the rear of the Soviet 6th Rifle Division on 17 January. In so doing, retreat eastward for the Soviet forces was precluded. The following day Narva was liberated.

Consequent to this the northeastern front stabilized along the Narva river. Within 11 days, the 1st Division had advanced 200 km.

In the southern sphere-of-conflict, Tartu was liberated through the rapid deployment of armored trains and the Tartumaa Partisan Battalion. The 2nd Division continued to advance southwards facing increasing Soviet resistance. In the Battle of Paju, the Tartumaa Partisan Battalion and the Finnish volunteers drove the Red Latvian Riflemen out of Valga on 31 January.

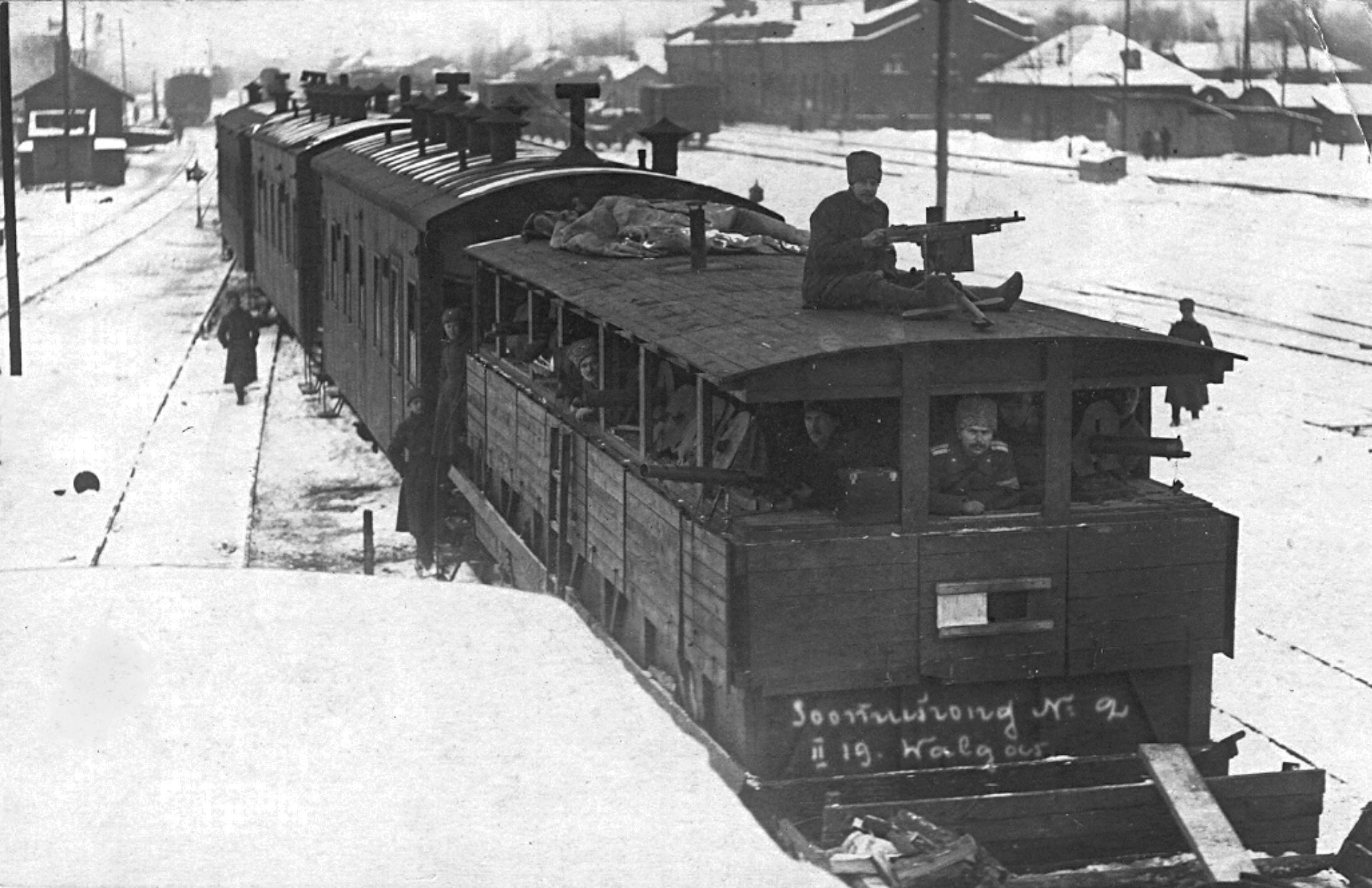
Estonian armoured train in Valga in February 1919

The 7th Red Army was routed outside the boundaries of contemporary Estonia and the battle-front continued outwards into the ancient, historical Estonian settlement area. The second half of February saw the Estonian southward advance capture Salacgrīva and Alūksne. This advance was soon stopped by a Soviet buildup ostensibly for a new expansionist offensive into Estonia. On the first Independence Day of 24 February 1919, the pro-independence Estonian forces on the front consisted of 19,000 men, 70 field guns, and 230 machine guns. Estonia had become the first country to repel the Soviet westward offensive.

In the second half of February, the Red armies started the new Soviet offensive to capture Estonia. To this end, the Soviets established what was referred to as the new 'Estonian' Red Army. This sizable force consisted upwards of 80,000 conscripts.

In positions along the Narva River the Estonian 1st Division and their allied White Russian Northern Corps repelled the 7th Red Army's attacks. The Red Army heavily bombarded Narva, leaving about 2,000 people homeless yet ultimately failed to capture the city. The majority of Soviet forces were concentrated at and along the southern front. The so-called 'Estonian' Red Army captured Alūksne, Setomaa, Vastseliina, and Räpina parishes by 15 March.

Having received reinforcements, the Estonian 2nd Division counterattacked and regained Petseri by 29 March. Subsequently, the 'Estonian' Red Army was pushed behind the Optjok River.

On 27 March, the Estonian 3rd Division was deployed along the western flank of the southern front under the command of Major-General Ernst Põdder. At Võru, the situation became critical on 22 April when the Red Army approached to within 1.5 km of the town. Heavy fighting continued at the southeastern front up to the first half of May.

On 25 April, the Red Latvian Riflemen captured Rūjiena, but were soon pushed back by the 3rd Division to Salacgrīva-Seda-Gauja line.

=== Estonian elections and formation of foreign units ===
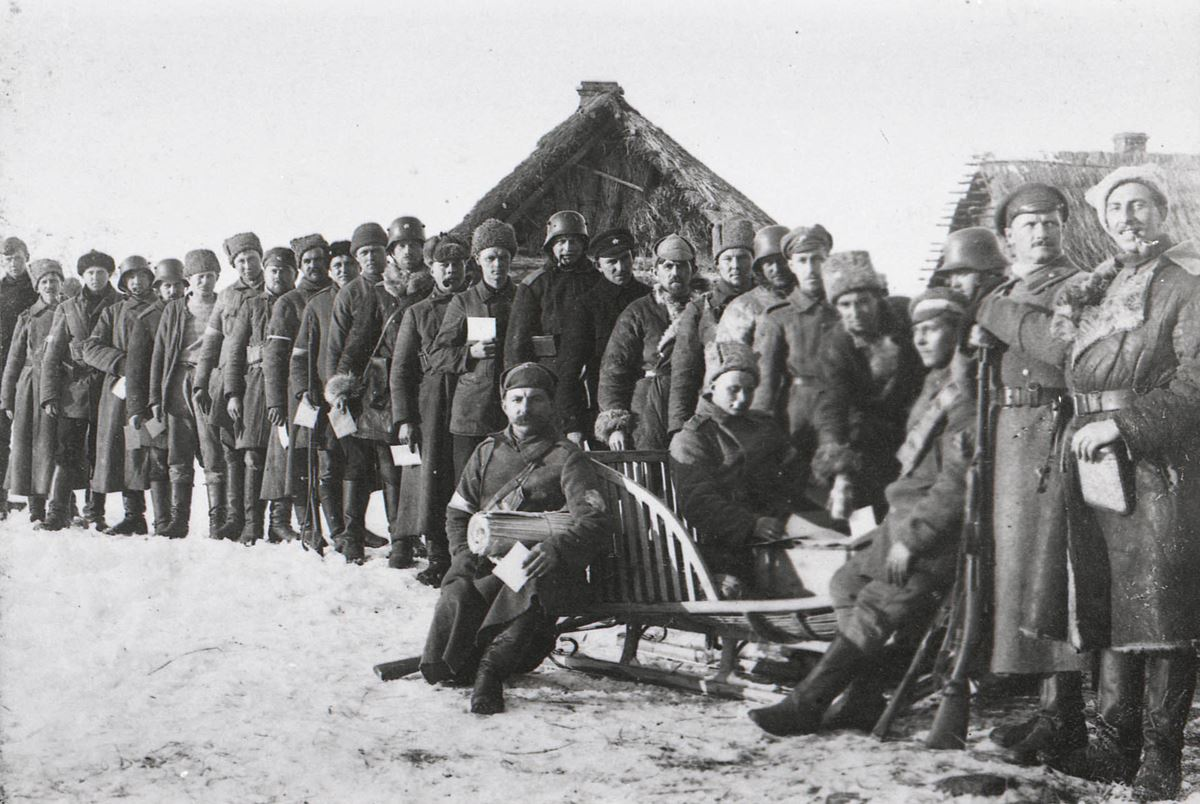
Estonian soldiers participating in Constituent Assembly election in April 1919

On 5–7 April 1919 the Estonian Constituent Assembly was elected. The elections were won by the Left and Centre parties. The 120 members of the Constituent Assembly met at the opening session on 23 April and elected Social Democrat August Rei as chairman. The provisional government retired, and a new government headed by Otto Strandman was formed. On 4 June the assembly adopted a temporary Constitution of Estonia. On 10 October the Land Reform Act was passed, which confiscated and redistributed the large Baltic German estates that covered more than half of the territory of Estonia.

Estonia actively helped to organize White Russian, Latvian and Ingrian forces on the territory of the Republic. The White Russian Northern Corps had been organizing in Estonia since December 1918. On 18 February, an agreement was signed between Estonia and Latvia, which allowed formation of Latvian forces under Estonian command but using them only on the southern front. The North Latvian Brigade under the command of Jorģis Zemitāns was formed from the citizens of Latvia who had fled to Estonia. In March 1919, an agreement was signed with the Ingrian National People's Committee for the formation of an Ingrian battalion. By May 1919, there were 6,000 Russians, 4,000 Latvians and 700 Ingrians in their respective national units.

=== Offensives into Russia and Latvia ===
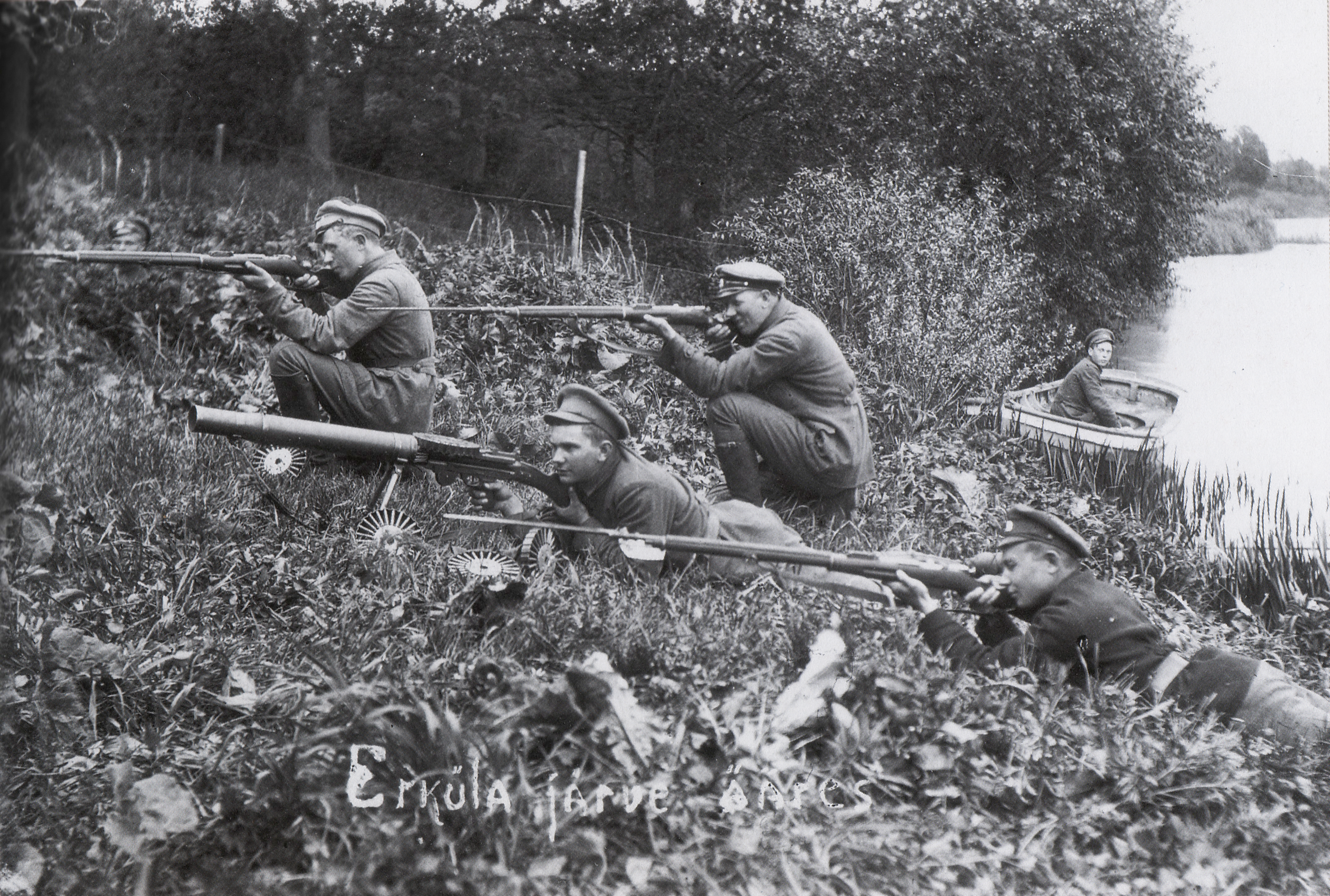
Estonian soldiers near Ārciems in Latvia in May 1919

Although the Estonian Army had attained control over its country, the opposing Red armies were still active. The Estonian High Command decided to push their defense lines across the border into Russia in support of the White Russian Northern Corps. On 13 May, the Northern Corps went on the offensive at Narva, catching the Soviets by surprise and destroying their 6th Division. The offensive was supported along the Gulf of Finland's coast by the British and Estonian navy and marines. With the front approaching, the garrison of the Krasnaya Gorka fort mutinied. But the 7th Red Army received reinforcements and counterattacked, pushing the White Russians back, until the front was stabilised with the support from the Estonian 1st Division on the Luga and Saba rivers.

The offensive of the Estonian Petseri Battle Group began on 24 May. The 600 troops of 1st Estonian Rifle Regiment of the Red Army together with Leonhard Ritt, commander of the 1st Estonian Rifle Division switched sides on the same day. An offensive destroyed the Estonian Red Army, captured Pskov on 25 May and cleared the territory between Estonia and the Velikaya River of Soviet forces. A few days later White Russian forces arrived in Pskov, but as they were unable to defend the town on their own, some Estonian forces remained in Pskov, while the rest were pulled back to the state border. The Northern Corps mobilised members of the local population in the Pskov region. On 19 June 1919, the Estonian Commander-in-Chief General Johan Laidoner rescinded his command over the White Russians, and they were renamed the Northwestern Army. Shortly afterwards, General Nikolai N. Yudenich took command of the troops.

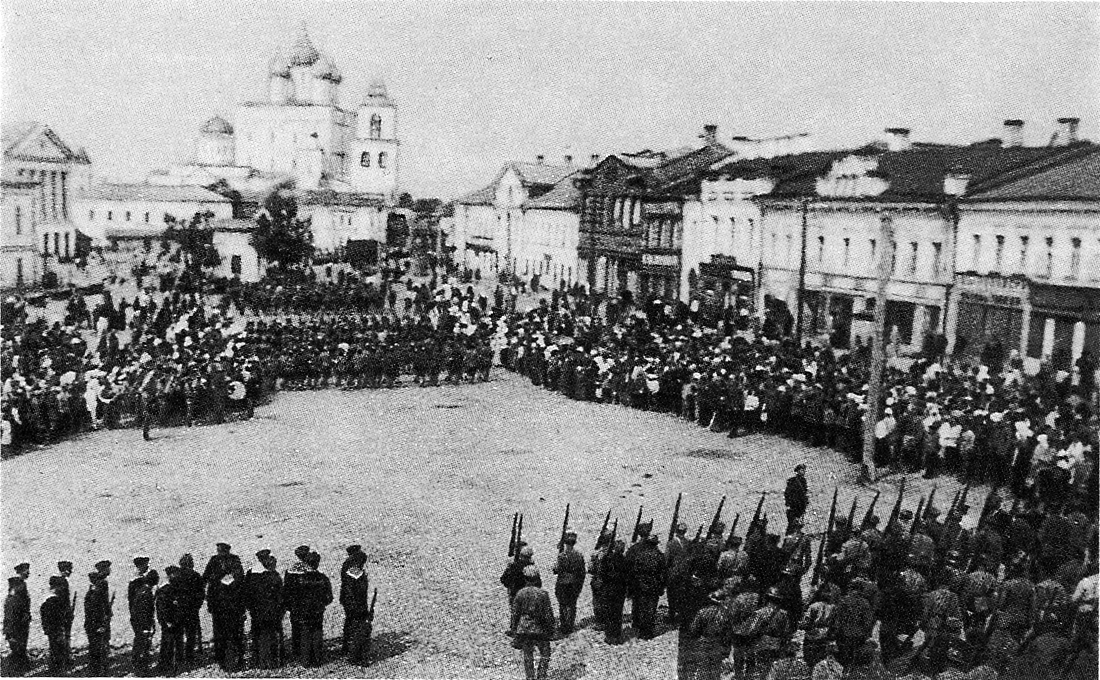
Estonian army parade in Pskov on 28 May 1919

Simultaneously with the Pskov offensive Estonian 2nd and 3rd divisions also started southward offensive into Northern-Latvia. By the end of May they had captured Alūksne and Valmiera. Due to simultaneous German-Latvian offensives in Western-Latvia, the situation was becoming very difficult for the Soviets. On 31 May, an Estonian cavalry regiment led by Gustav Jonson reached Gulbene, capturing large amount of rolling stock, including 2 armoured trains. a rapid offensive of the 2nd Division, spearheaded by its cavalry regiment, continued and on 6 June it crossed Daugava river and captured Jēkabpils, but the 3rd Division could not support the advance of the 2nd division anymore as it was now facing a new enemy: the Baltische Landeswehr.

=== War against the Landeswehr ===
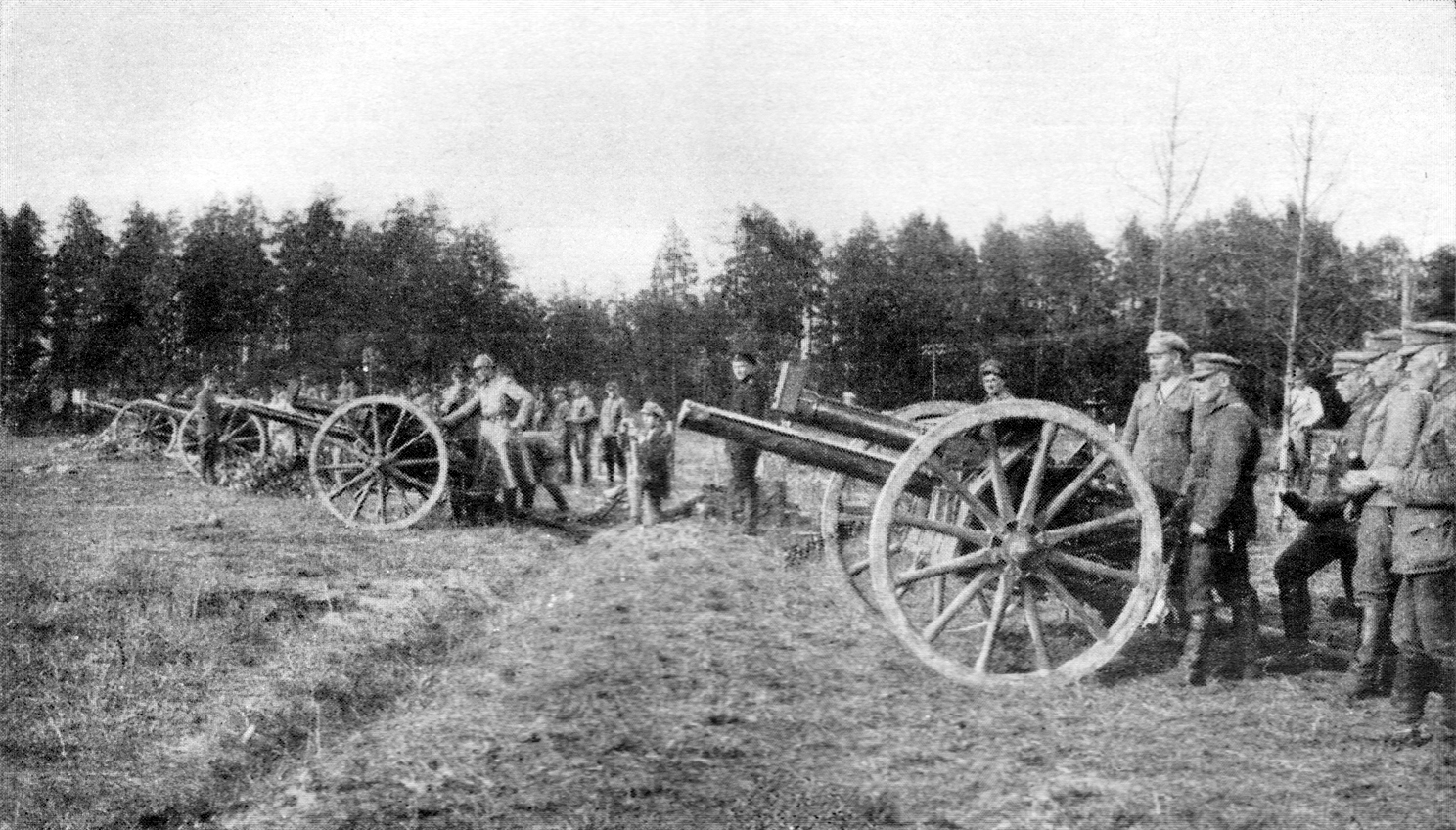
Estonian artillery in war against the Landeswehr

The war against the Baltische Landeswehr broke out on the southern front in Latvia on 5 June 1919. The Latvian democrats led by Kārlis Ulmanis had declared independence as in Estonia but were soon pushed back to Liepāja by Soviet forces, where the German VI Reserve Corps finally stopped their advance. This German force, led by general Rüdiger von der Goltz, consisted of the Baltische Landeswehr formed from Baltic Germans, the Guards Reserve Division of former Imperial German Army soldiers who had stayed in Latvia, and the Freikorps Iron Division of volunteers motivated by prospects of acquiring properties in the Baltics. This was possible because the terms of their armistice with the Western Allies obliged the Germans to maintain their armies in the East to counter the Bolshevist threat. The VI Reserve Corps also included the 1st Independent Latvian Battalion led by Oskars Kalpaks, which consisted of ethnic Latvians loyal to the Provisional Government of Latvia.

The Germans disrupted the organization of Latvian national forces, and on 16 April 1919 the Provisional Government was toppled and replaced with the pro-German puppet Provisional Government of Latvia led by Andrievs Niedra. Ulmanis took refuge aboard the steamship "Saratow" under Entente protection. The VI Reserve Corps pushed the Soviets back, capturing Riga on 23 May, continued to advance northwards, and demanded that the Estonian Army ended its occupation of parts of northern Latvia. The real intent of the VI Reserve Corps was to annex Estonia into a German-dominated puppet state.

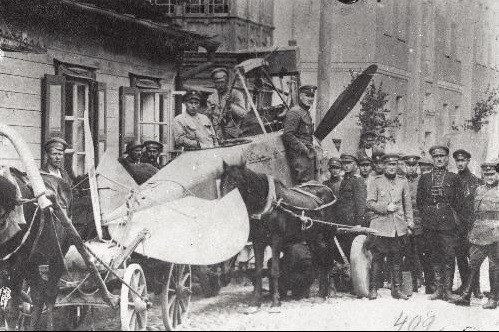
Landeswehr plane shot down by Estonian forces

On 3 June, Estonian General Laidoner issued an ultimatum demanding that German forces must pull back southwards, leaving the broad gauge railway between Ieriķi and Gulbene under Estonian control. When Estonian armoured trains moved out on 5 June to check compliance with this demand, the Baltische Landeswehr attacked them, unsuccessfully. The following day, the Baltische Landeswehr captured Cēsis. On 8 June, an Estonian counterattack was repelled. The first clashes demonstrated that the VI Reserve Corps was stronger and better equipped than the Soviets. On 10 June, with Entente mediation, a ceasefire was made. Despite the Entente demand for the German force to pull behind the line demanded by the Estonians, von der Goltz refused and demanded Estonian withdrawal from Latvia, threatening to continue fighting. On 19 June, fighting resumed with an assault of the Iron Division on positions of the Estonian 3rd Division near Limbaži and Straupe, starting the Battle of Cēsis. At that time, the 3rd Estonian Division, including the 2nd Latvian Cēsis regiment under Colonel Krišjānis Berķis, had 5990 infantry and 125 cavalry. Intensive German attacks on Estonian positions continued up to 22 June, without achieving a breakthrough. On 23 June, the Estonian 3rd Division counterattacked, recapturing Cēsis. The anniversary of the Battle of Cēsis (Võnnu lahing in Estonian) is celebrated in Estonia as the Victory Day.

The Estonian 3rd Division continued their advance towards Riga. On 3 July, when the Estonian forces were at the outskirts of Riga, a ceasefire was made on the demand of the Entente and the Ulmanis government was restored in Riga. The German forces were ordered to leave Latvia, the Baltische Landeswehr was put under the command of the Latvian Provisional Government and sent to fight against the Red Army. However, to circumvent Entente's orders, the troops of the disbanded VI Reserve Corps, instead of leaving, were incorporated into the West Russian Volunteer Army, officially hired by the German puppet Government of Latvia and led by Pavel Bermondt-Avalov. In October, fighting restarted when the West Russian Volunteer Army attacked Riga. Following the Latvian request to help, Estonia sent two armoured trains to aid repelling the German attack. The Estonian army also remained to support the defence of Latvia against Soviets by defending the front north of Lake Lubāns.

=== Final battles and peace negotiations ===
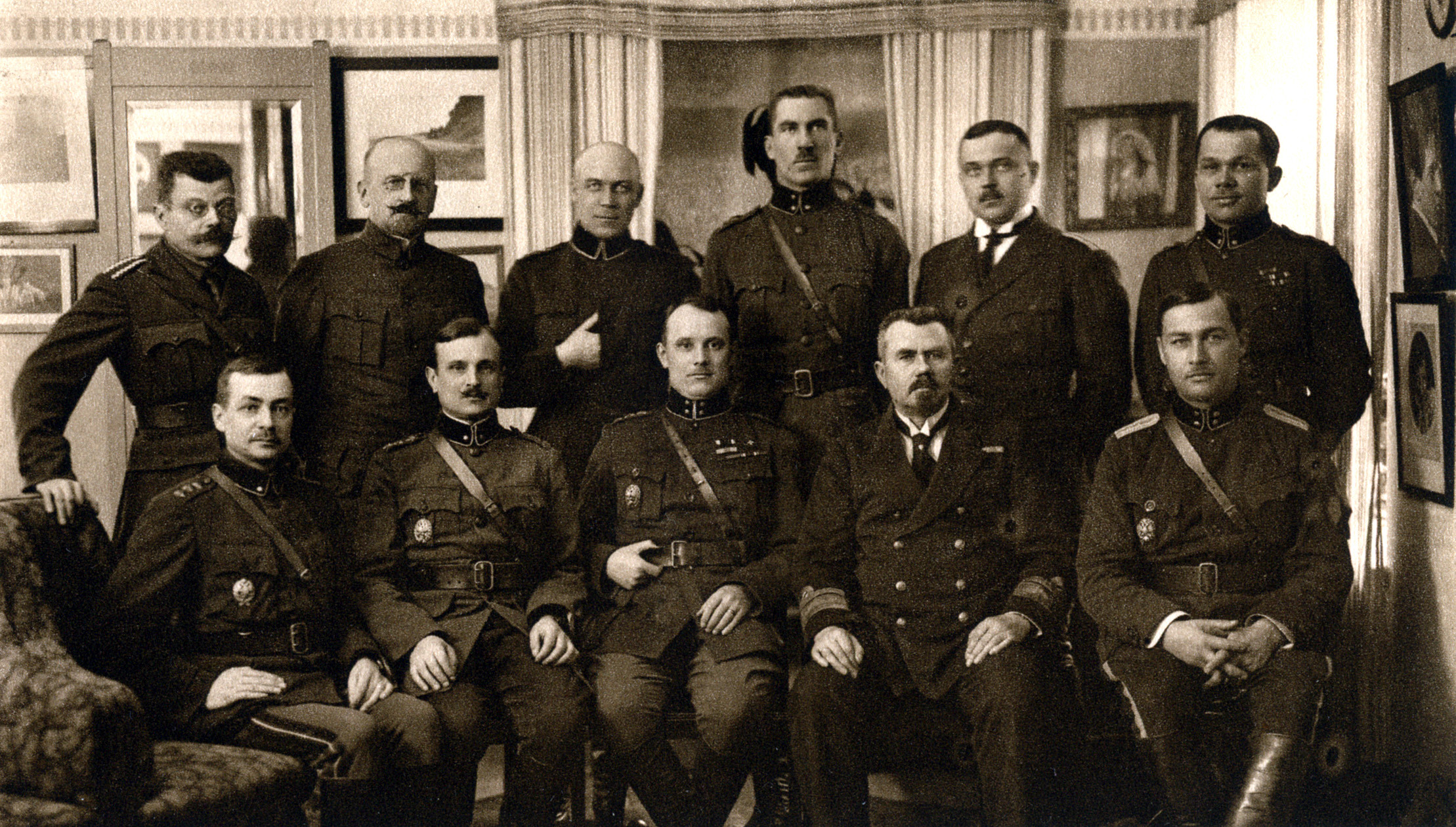
Estonian Army High Command in 1920 Names: From upper left: Major General Ernst Põdder; Dr. Arthur Lossmann; Major General Aleksander Tõnisson; Colonel Karl Parts; Colonel Viktor Puskar; Colonel Jaan Rink; From bottom left: Major General Andres Larka; Major General Jaan Soots; Commander-in-chief Lieutenant General Johan Laidoner; Admiral Johan Pitka; Colonel Rudolf Reimann

Soviet Russia had been attempting to conclude a peace since the spring of 1919. On 25 April 1919, Hungarian Communists offered to mediate a settlement between the Bolsheviks and the Estonians, but Admiral Cowan threatened withdrawal of support to the Estonians unless they rejected the Hungarian offer. The Russians then publicly broached the subject of peace talks in a radio broadcast on 27 and 28 April. On 5 June the Estonian Commune was abolished. A subsequent broadcast by the Russians on 21 July led to the British journalist Arthur Ransome sounding out the Commissar for Foreign Relations Georgy Chicherin on the subject of peace talks. As a result, the Soviet government made a formal offer for negotiations on 31 August 1919. The Estonians accepted on 4 September, and delegations started talks on 16 September. Estonia then proposed to stop the negotiations until Latvia, Lithuania and Finland have agreed to participate in joint negotiations.

In the autumn, the Northwestern Army launched operation White Sword, a major effort to capture Petrograd. With the arms provided by Britain and France, and the operational support by the Estonian Army, Estonian Navy, and Royal Navy, the Northwestern Army began the offensive on 28 September 1919. Estonia supported the Northwestern Army due to the demands of the Entente. The Estonian forces made joint naval and land attacks against the Krasnaya Gorka fort, while the Estonian 2nd Division attempted to destroy bridges over the Velikaya River and the Estonian 3rd Division attacked towards Pytalovo. The Northwestern Army approached to 16 kilometres (10 miles) from Petrograd, but the Red Army repulsed the White Russian troops back to the Narva River. Distrustful of the White Russians, the Estonian High Command disarmed and interned the remains of the Northwestern Army that retreated behind the state border.

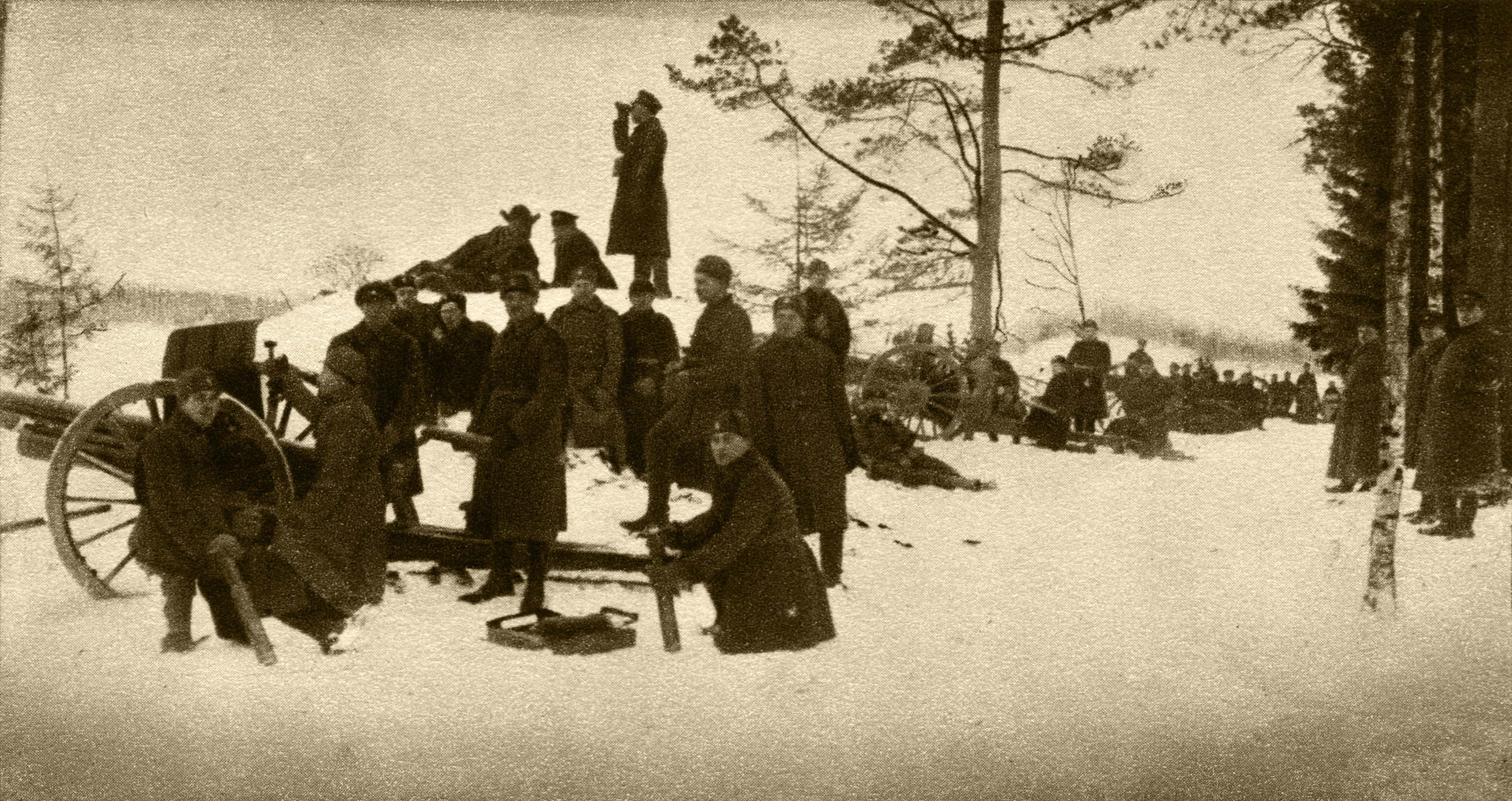
Estonian field battery near Narva in late 1919

The 7th and 15th Soviet Armies advancing behind collapsing White Russian forces continued to attack the fortified positions at the state border near Narva. The first clashes took place on Luga River on 16 November, starting the conclusive battles with 120,000 Soviets facing 40,000 Estonians. After repeated attacks, the 7th Red Army managed to achieve some limited success. At the end of November, the situation on the front calmed, as the Soviets needed to replenish their forces. In order to pressure Estonia in the peace talks, intensive Soviet attacks restarted on 7 December. On 16 December, the situation became critical as forward units of the 15th Red Army crossed the Narva River. The next day, an Estonian counterattack pushed the Soviets back. The Estonian high command actively reinforced the 1st Division at Narva during the battles, sending in the headquarters of the 3rd Division. General Tõnisson became commander of the Viru Front. After suffering 35,000 casualties in heavy battles, the Red Army was completely exhausted by the end of December.

On 19 November, the new government of Jaan Tõnisson decided to restart talks with Soviet Russia, even without the participation of other Baltic countries. Negotiations began on 5 December, with the main point of dispute being territorial issues. Talks continued through December, with both sides pressing their territorial demands, while heavy fighting continued at Narva. The peace treaty was finally concluded on 31 December 1919, and the ceasefire came into effect on 3 January 1920.

== Foreign assistance ==
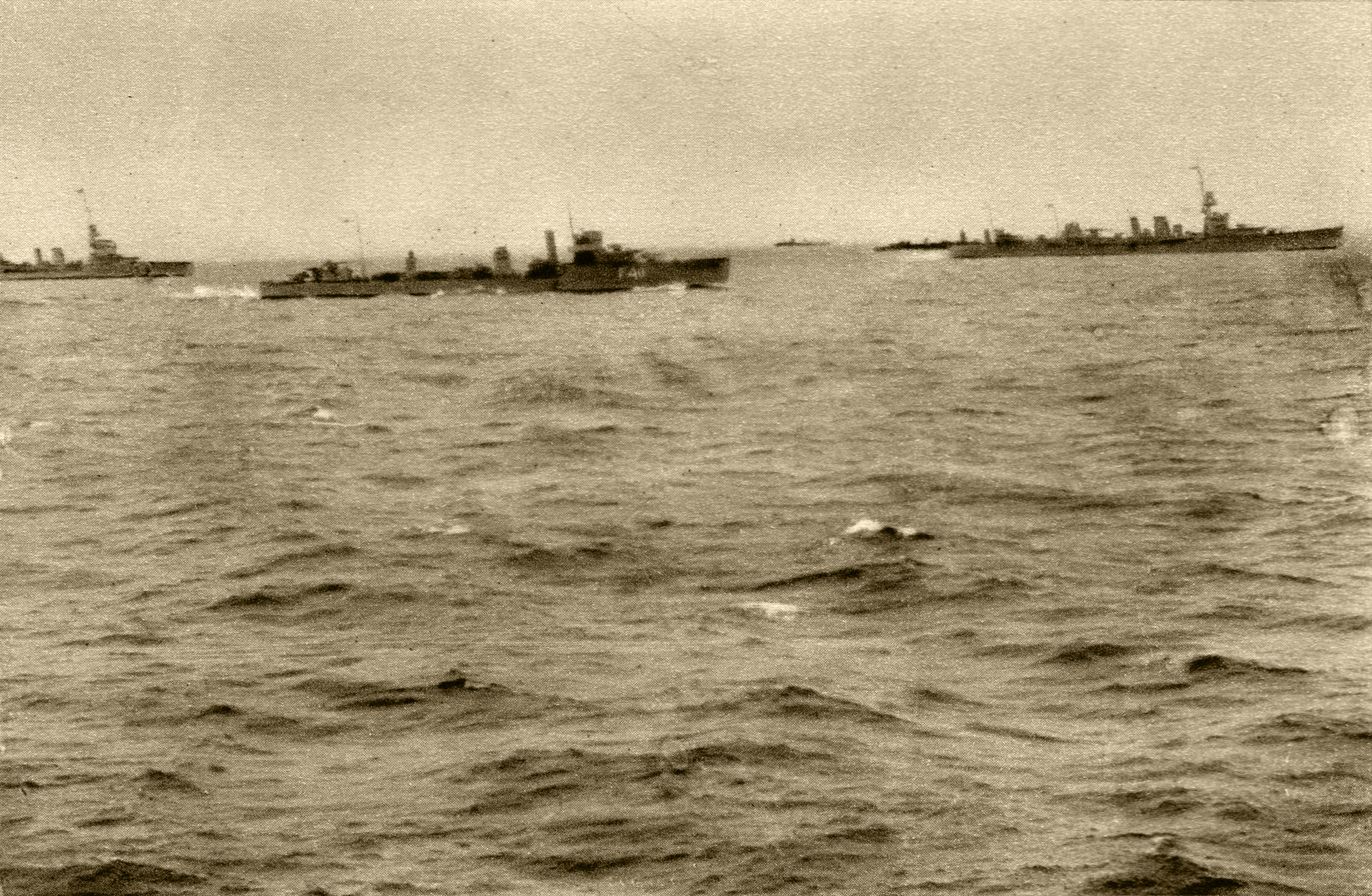
British squadron in Koporye Bay in October 1919

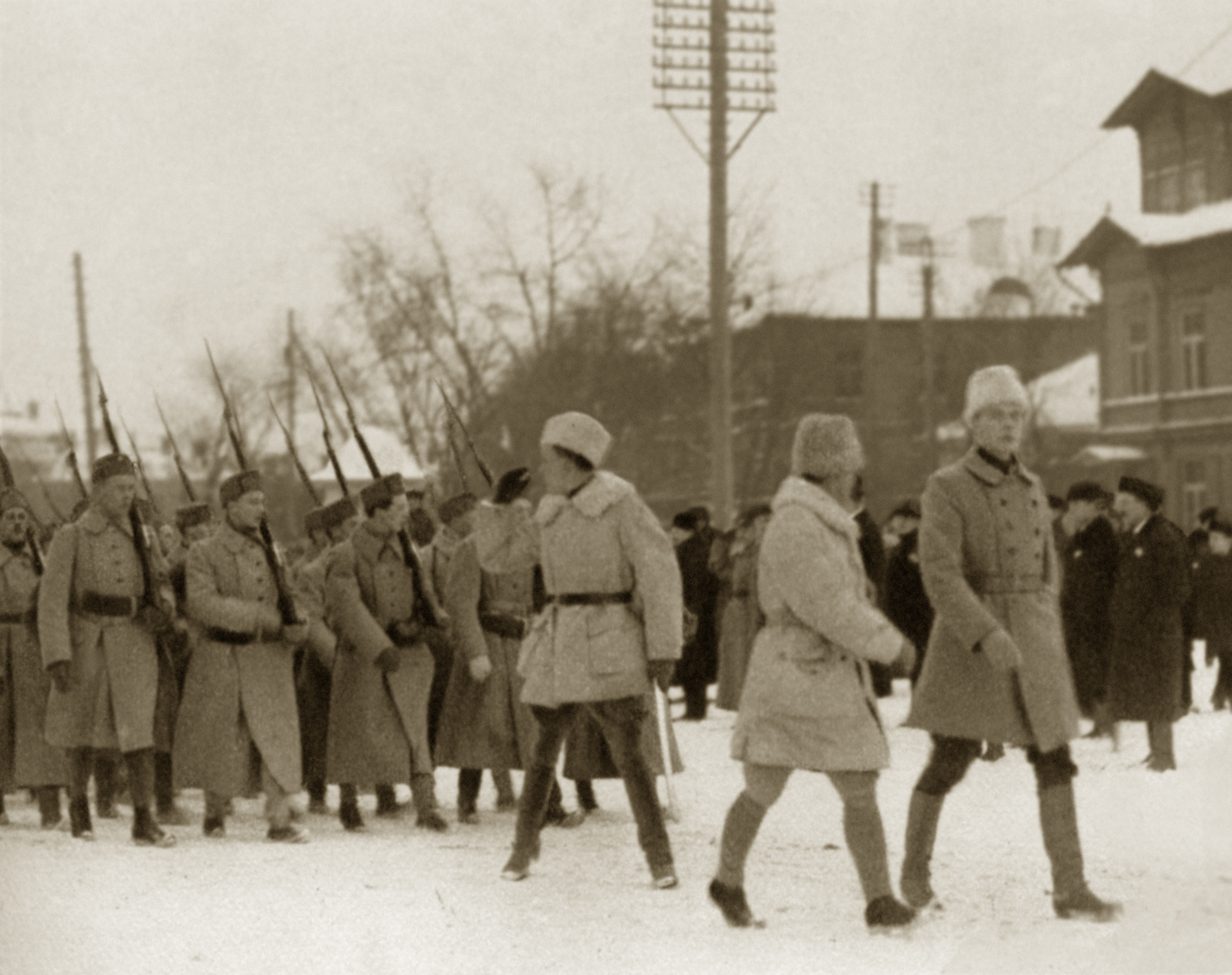
Finnish volunteers arrive in Tallinn, Estonia, in December 1918

Foreign assistance, mostly from the United Kingdom and Finland, played a very important role during the early stages of war.

British naval and air forces arrived in December 1918, after lobbying in London by Estonian politicians. At this time, the new Estonian government was weak and desperate, and the Estonian Prime Minister even asked that his state be declared a British protectorate, but Britain would not meet this plea. However, the British squadron delivered 6500 rifles, 200 machine guns, and two field guns. In addition, two Soviet destroyers were captured near Tallinn and turned over to Estonia. A Royal Navy squadron continued to provide artillery support on the coast and also protected the Estonian flank against the Russian Baltic Fleet. The United Kingdom remained Estonia's main supplier of arms and equipment throughout the war.

While the British navy provided considerable support, the historian William Fletcher concludes that "the British naval force would have had little effect on the outcome of Baltic affairs had not the Estonians and Latvians provided a vibrant and disciplined land and sea force". The British contributed 88 ships to the Baltic campaign, of which 16 were sunk. 128 British servicemen died in the campaign, nine were captured, and at least 27 were wounded.

Concerned with having Bolshevik rule in the South, Finland delivered funds and weapons. Finland provided 5000 rifles and 20 field guns by 12 December. Finland also sent 3500 volunteers. Pohjan Pojat led by Hans Kalm fought at the Southern Front, including at the Battle of Paju, while I Suomalainen Vapaajoukko led by Martin Ekström fought at the Viru Front, including at the Battle of Utria. Finnish volunteers returned to Finland on March–April 1919, having lost 150 men.

The Danish-Baltic Auxiliary Corps with approximately 200 men was formed under the command of Captain Richard Gustav Borgelin in April 1919. The company took part in battles against Bolsheviks in Latvia and near Pskov and 19 men were killed by the time their contract ended in September. R. G. Borgelin was promoted to Lieutenant Colonel and given Maidla manor in gratitude for his services.

The Swedish volunteer unit under the command of Carl Mothander was formed in Sweden in early 1919. In March 1919, 178 volunteers took part in scout missions in Virumaa. In April, the company was sent to the Southern front and took part of the battles near Pechory. In May, the company was disbanded with some volunteers joining other units and the rest returning to Sweden.

== Tartu Peace Treaty ==
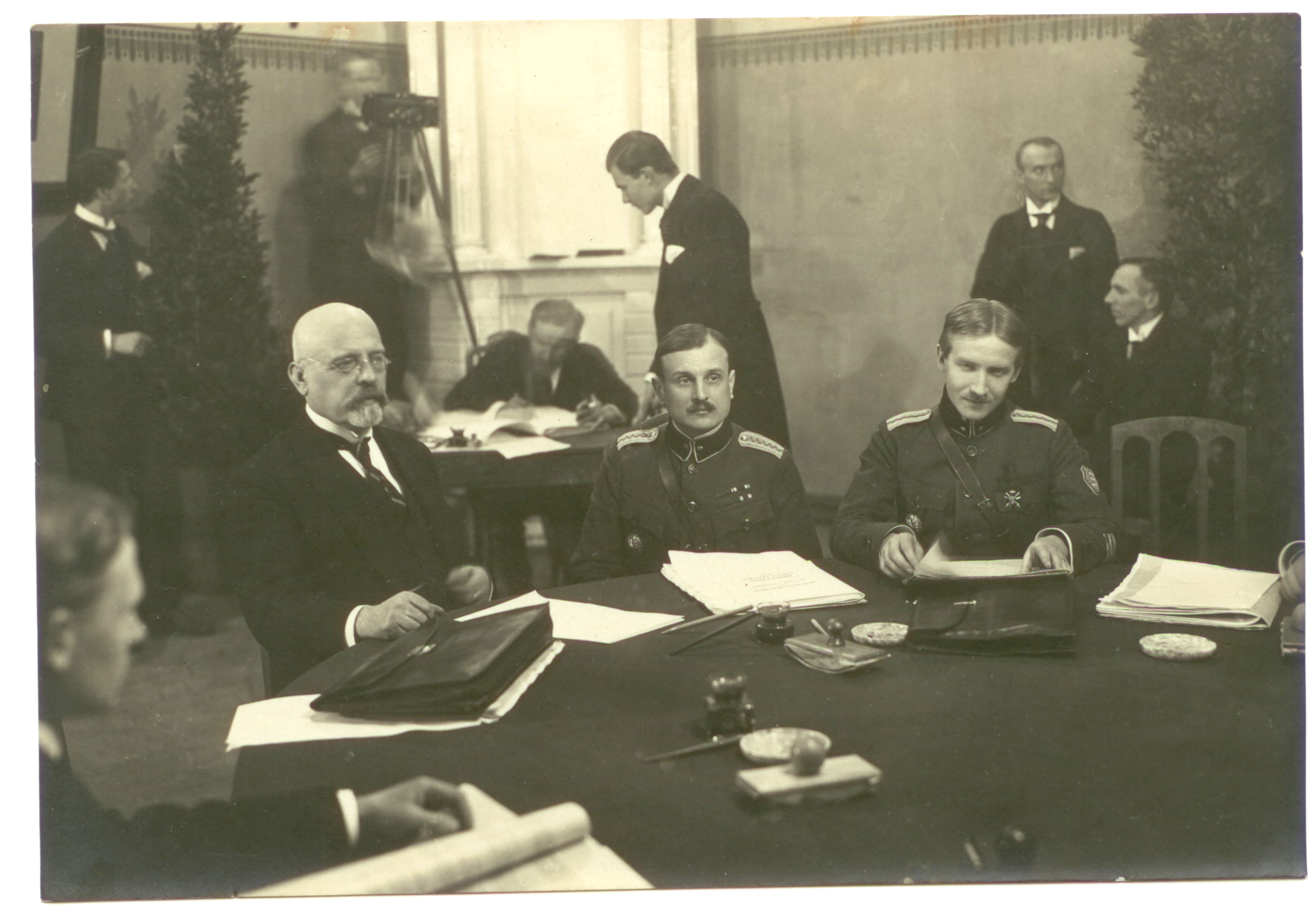
Part of the Estonian delegation at the negotiations of the Treaty of Tartu (left to right): Jaan Poska, Jaan Soots and Victor Mutt.

On 2 February 1920, the Peace Treaty of Tartu was signed by the Republic of Estonia and RSFSR. At this point, the Bolshevist regime had not been recognized by any Western power. The terms of the treaty stated that Russia renounced in perpetuity all rights to the territory of Estonia. The agreed frontier corresponded roughly with the position of the front line at the cessation of hostilities. In particular, Estonia retained a strategic strip to the east of the Narva river and Setumaa in the southeast. (Note: These areas were lost by Estonia during World War II in 1944, shortly after the Soviet troops had reconquered Estonia, when the Stalinist Soviet central government administratively transferred the land east of the Narva River and most of Petseri County from then Soviet-controlled Estonia to Soviet Russia.)

== In popular culture ==
The most notable works on the war of independence include a 1927 silent film The Young Eagles, directed by Theodor Luts, a 1936 novel Names in Marble by Albert Kivikas, which served as the basis for the 2002 film adaptation of the same name, directed by Elmo Nüganen, and a twelve-part television mini-series Windward Land (2008–2013).

== See also ==
- List of states and regions involved in the Russian Civil War
- Bibliography of the Russian Revolution and Civil War
- Outline of the Russian Revolution and Civil War
- Timeline of the Estonian War of Independence
- Political terror in Finland and Baltic States after World War I
- History of Estonia
- Latvian War of Independence
- Lithuanian Wars of Independence
- Ukrainian War of Independence
- Finnish Civil War
- War of Independence Victory Column
