= Arkma =

Village in Estonia

Coordinates: 58°40′N 25°36′E

- Village
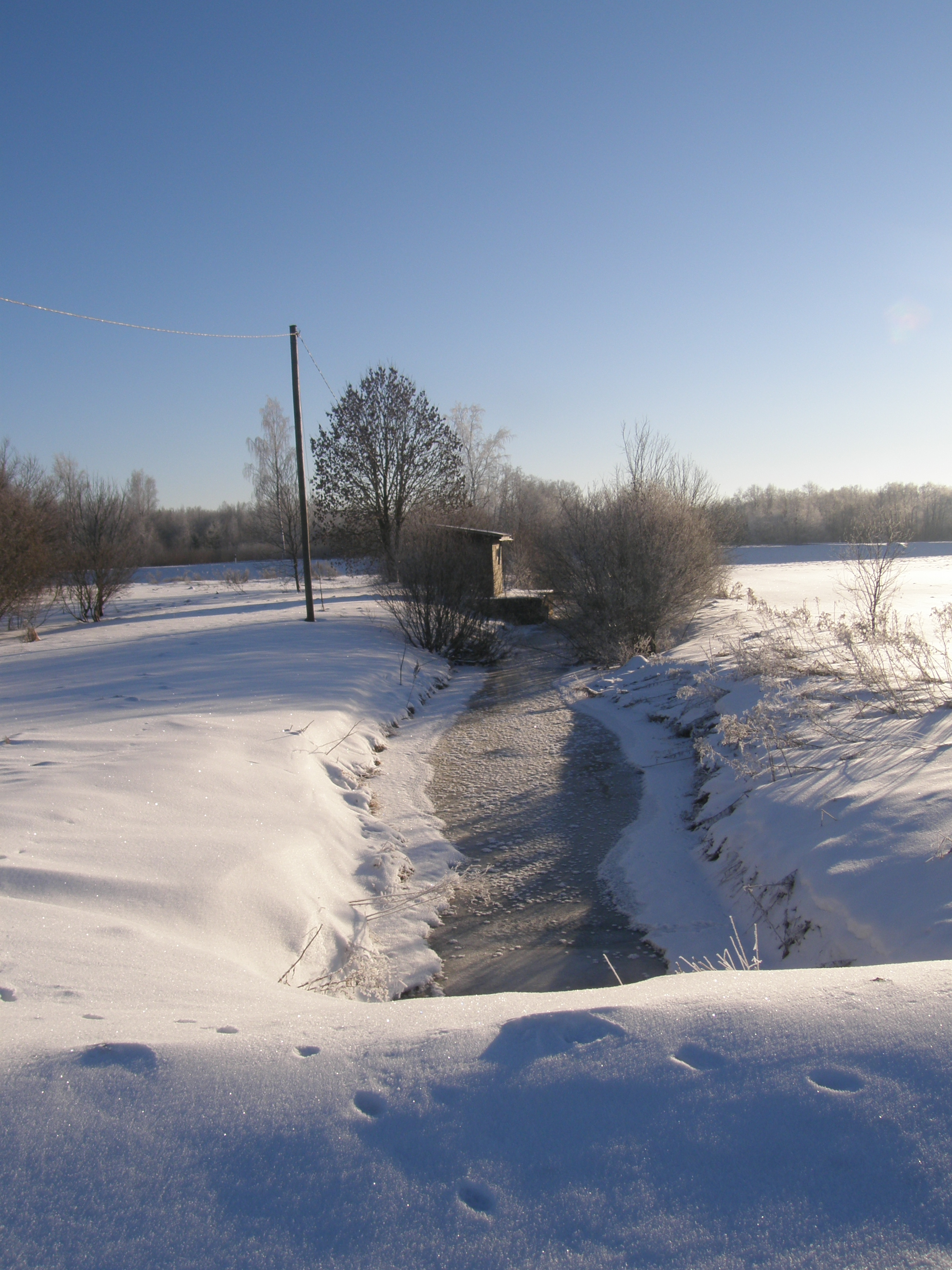
- Interactive map of Arkma
- Country: Estonia
- County: Järva County
- Parish: Türi Parish
- Time zone: UTC+2 (EET)
  - Summer (DST): UTC+3 (EEST)

Arkma is a village in Türi Parish, Järva County in northern-central Estonia.

The politician Jüri Vilms (1889–1918) was born in Arkma.
