= Estonian Provisional Government =

1918–1919 intermittently existing government of Estonia

The Estonian Provisional Government (Estonian: Eesti Ajutine Valitsus) was formed on 24 February 1918, by the Salvation Committee appointed by Maapäev, the Estonian Province Assembly.

== History ==
=== Konstantin Päts' first provisional cabinet ===
The Provisional Government was led by Konstantin Päts. Jüri Vilms was appointed minister of justice, Jaan Poska minister of foreign affairs, Juhan Kukk minister of finance, Jaan Raamot minister of food and agriculture, Andres Larka minister of war. Villem Maasik was minister of labour and welfare, Ferdinand Peterson minister of roads and Peeter Põld minister of education.

The main functions of the Provisional Government were lobbying for diplomatic recognition for Estonian independence abroad, oppose the German occupation of Estonia and organise elections to the Estonian Constituent Assembly.

After the formation of the Provisional Government, the country was occupied by German troops and became administered by Ober Ost. As the result of German revolution and capitulation of Germany in World War I on 11 November, the German occupation authorities handed over the power to the Estonian Provisional Government on 19 November 1918.

=== Konstantin Päts' second provisional cabinet ===
From 11 November 1918 to 27 November 1918, Konstantin Päts' second provisional cabinet was in power.

=== Konstantin Päts' third provisional cabinet ===
The Estonian Provisional Government resigned on 8 May 1919, after the Estonian Constituent Assembly had met on 23 April 1919, and the first elected government of the Republic of Estonia took office.

== See also ==
- Estonian War of Independence
- Commune of the Working People of Estonia
- Autonomous Governorate of Estonia
