= Carl Axel Mothander =

Swedish military personnel

Major Carl Axel Mothander
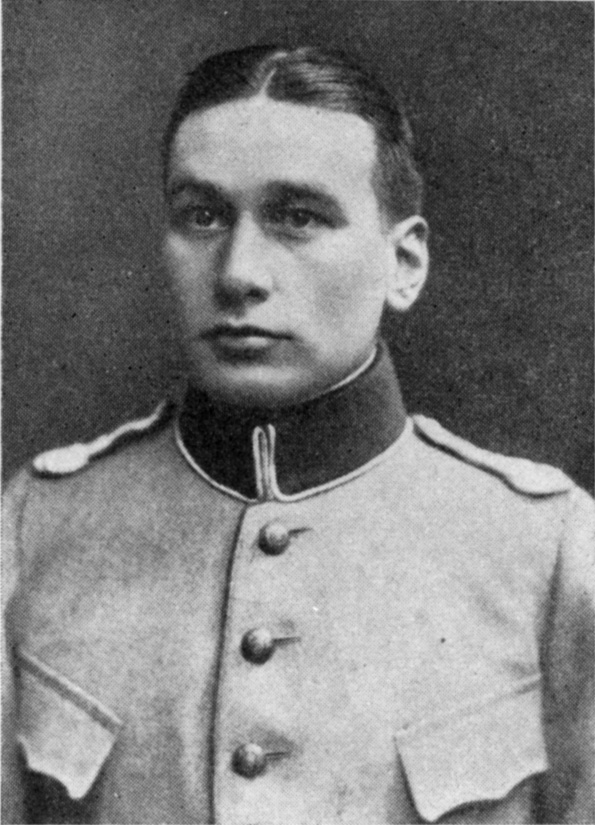
- Born: 1886; Stockholm
- Died: 1965 (aged 78–79)
- Occupations: Soldier and author
- Spouse: Benita von Wrangel

Carl Axel Mothander (14 January 1886 – 1965) was a former Swedish reserve officer; major in the White Finnish Army in the Finnish Civil War, organizer of the Finnish White Army's field hospitals promoted to major; commander of the Swedish volunteers in the Estonian War of Independence promoted to lieutenant colonel. After the war, in 1928, Mothander settled in Estonia, as he married a Baltic German Baroness, Benita von Wrangel (1878–1967). Thereafter Mothander tried to take the role of mediator between the Estonians and the Baltic Germans. The Baltic Germans' effective rule and class privileges had come to an end with the establishment of the Republic of Estonia. On October 10, 1919, The Land Reform Act was passed by the Estonian Constituent Assembly. This act confiscated and redistributed the Baltic German estates, ending 700 years of possession of the regions that the Germans had gained after the Livonian Crusade.

Mothander is the author of the books Baroner, bönder och bolsjeviker i Estland (Barons, Locals and Bolsheviks in Estonia) translated into German, Finnish and Estonian. The book analyzed the relationships between Estonians, Baltic Germans and Bolsheviks after the War of Independence. The Finnish translation was censored and banned from book stores in Finland in 1944–1946 Svenske kungens Vita Skepp, det äventyrliga spelet om Estlandssvenskarna (The Swedish King's White Ship) is a book written by Carl Mothander about the Estonian Swedes. The books were published in Sweden after Mothander and his wife narrowly escaped from the hands of the NKVD in 1940.

The Swedish volunteer unit to support the Republic of Estonia in the Estonian War of Independence under the command of Carl Mothander was formed in Sweden in early 1919. In March 1919, 178 volunteers took part in scout missions in Virumaa. In April, the company was sent to the Southern front and took part of the battles near Pechory. By May 5 there was 68 men left in the company. On May 17, the company was disbanded by order of the Estonian Minister of War. Some of the volunteers returned home to Sweden, some joined the Estonian Army, some the Danish volunteer unit. Other commanders of the Swedish volunteers in Estonia included C.G. Malmberg and L. Hällen.

Mothander also worked for the Estonian Red Cross and was a member of the Red Cross Katyn Commission that investigated the Soviet mass murder of Polish officers taken prisoner during the Soviet Invasion of Poland.
