= Konstantin Konik =

Estonian politician and surgeon

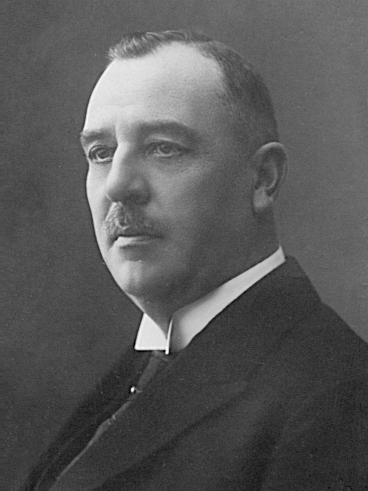
- Born: 31 December 1873; Dorpat, Russian Empire
- Died: 3 August 1936 (aged 62); Tartu, Estonia
- Occupations: Surgeon, Politician
- Known for: Member of the Estonian Salvation Committee

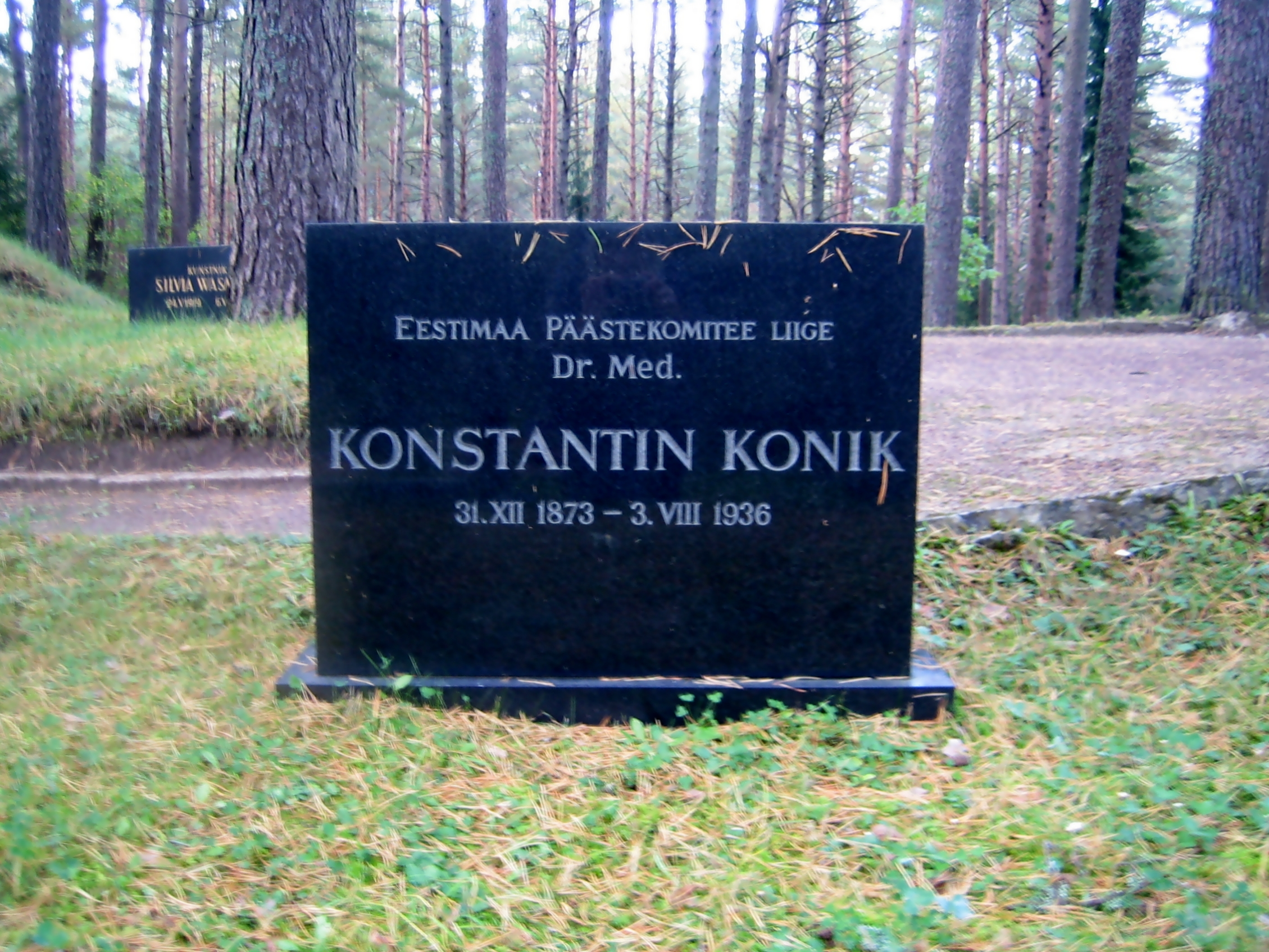
Konstantin Konik's grave at Metsakalmistu Cemetery in Tallinn.

Konstantin Konik (31 December [O.S. 19 December] 1873 – 3 August 1936) was an Estonian politician and surgeon who served as a member of the Estonian Salvation Committee.

Konstantin Konik was born to a working-class family in Tartu; his father made living as a carter. After studying at the Governorate Gymnasium in Tartu, Konstantin Konik graduated from the faculty of Medicine of the Imperial University of Dorpat (now University of Tartu) in 1873, and made his doctorate degree at the Odessa University in 1903.

On 8 March 1920 Konik made history at the University of Tartu by giving the first lecture ever made on medicine in Estonian. The University of Tartu was established as an Estonian institution only in 1919, it had been the University of Dorpat, a Baltic German institution, before, where only German and since the 1880s–90s Russian language had been used.

Political offices
Preceded by Hugo Kukke	Estonian Minister of Education; 1933	Succeeded by Nikolai Kann
