= German occupation of Estonia during World War I =

Part of the war

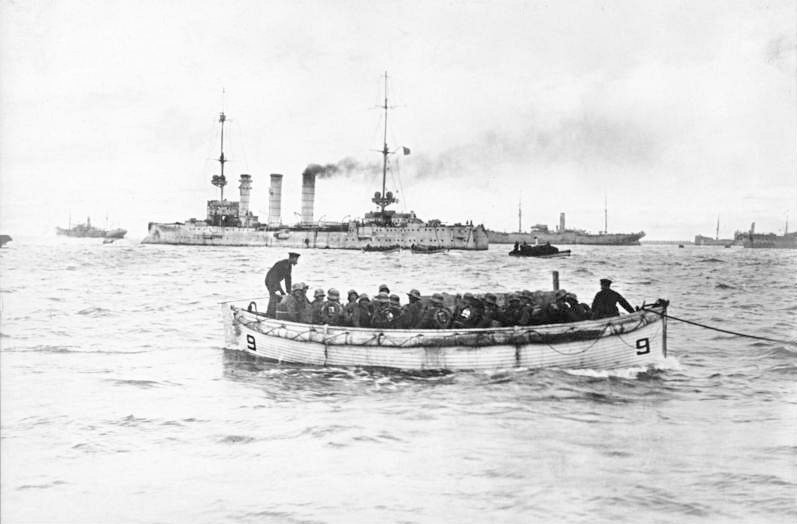
German troops landing at Saaremaa (Ösel)

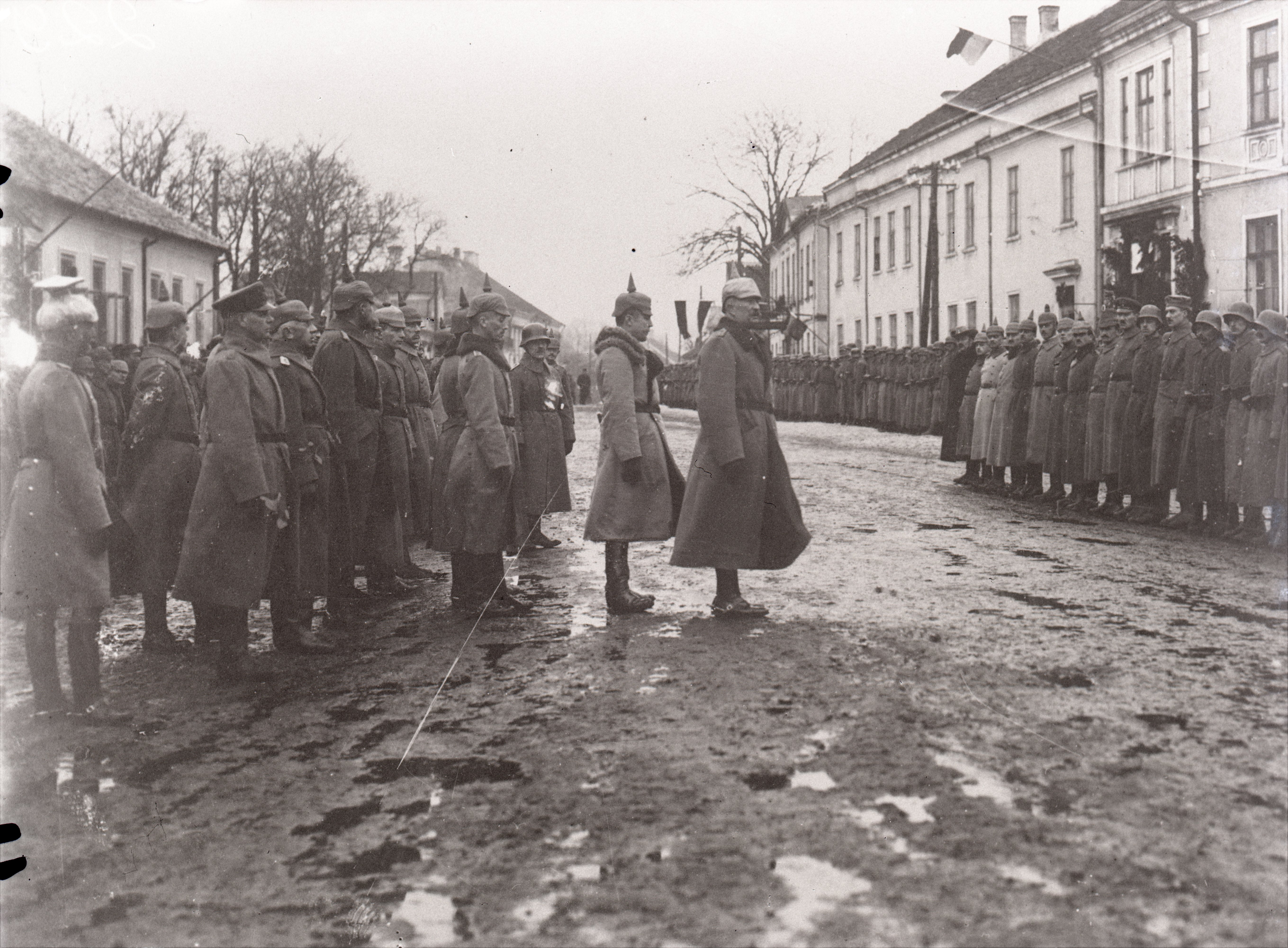
German troops in midtown Kuressaare (1918)

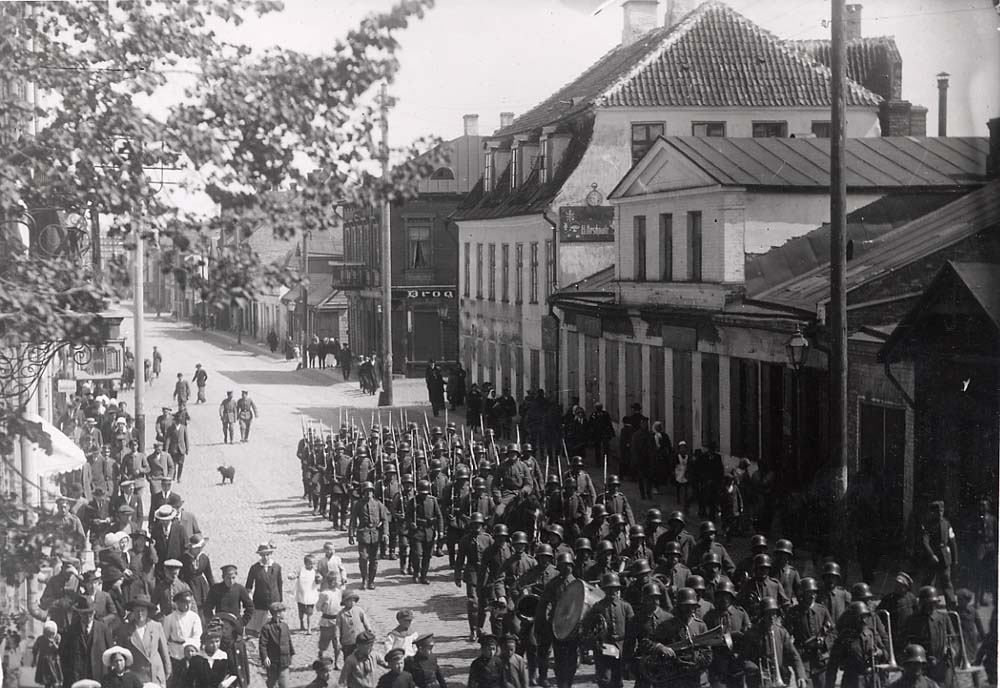
German military parade in Tartu, Estonia (1918)

Estonia was under military occupation by the German Empire during the later stages of the First World War. On 11–21 October 1917, the Imperial German Army occupied the West Estonian archipelago (Moonsund archipelago), including the larger islands of Saaremaa (Ösel), Hiiumaa (Dagö), and Muhu (Moon).

Fighting in Estonia ceased whilst negotiations over the Treaty of Brest-Litovsk took place. These broke down in February 1918, and to put pressure on the new Bolshevik regime of Soviet Russia to sign the Treaty of Brest-Litovsk, the Germans landed on the mainland of Estonia on 18 February 1918 and marched on Haapsalu (Hapsal) on 21 February 1918. The German forces occupied Valga (Walk) on 22 February, and Pärnu (Pernau), Viljandi (Fellin) and Tartu (Dorpat) on 24 February. Tallinn (Reval) was occupied on 25 February 1918, and in the rest of the Estonian mainland the last town captured by German forces was Narva (Narwa) on 4 March 1918. For the time being, the German advance put an end to both the Estonian Provisional Government which had declared the country independent on 24 February 1918 in Tallinn, as well as to the remaining Bolshevik Russian Red Guards in Estonia. The last Red Guards escaped to Russia over the Narva river on 5 March 1918.

Lieutenant General Adolf von Seckendorff arrived in Tallinn on 28 February 1918. He had acted as military commander of the 3rd Kommandatur at the head of the German military administration of the West Estonian archipelago. Later in 1918, with the signing of the Treaty of Brest-Litowsk, the Russian Bolshevik government renounced all claims of sovereignty over Estonia, formally giving the German Empire the right to either annex, or create a client state in, Estonia. Estonia became part of the German Ober Ost (military administration for Curonia, Estonia, Livonia, Ösel, and Riga) until the end of World War I in November 1918.

== German occupation ==
The first part of what is now Estonia that was occupied was island Ruhnu (then part of Governorate of Livonia) in 1915.

During the occupation of Estonia, the Germans suffered total 368 dead and about 1400 wounded soldiers. They took 20,000 Russian Bolshevik POW's and captured several Russian warships. One older Russian warship, battleship Slava, was sunk during the Battle of Moon Sound near the coast of Muhu island. The Imperial German Army used its 60th Corps (19th Infantry Division, 77th Reserve Division, and 4th Cavalry Division) to attack Northern Livonia and Estonia. The 6th Corps (205th and 219th Infantry Divisions, and 1st Cavalry Division) attacked from West Estonian archipelago to Lihula, Virtsu, and Haapsalu.

== Estonian Declaration of Independence ==
Between retreating Russian and advancing German troops, the Occupation of Estonia by the German Empire approaching, the Estonian Salvation Committee of the Estonian Provincial Assembly, declared the independence of Estonia on 24 February 1918. However, the German forces did not recognise the independence of Estonia before the end of World War I and the German capitulation in November 1918.

In 1918, the local Baltic German nobility made an unsuccessful attempt to establish a pro-German client state ("United Baltic Duchy") in then German-occupied Latvia and Estonia. When signing the Treaty of Brest-Litovsk on 3 March 1918, the Soviet Russian government of Vladimir Lenin formally accepted the German military administration over Estonia.

On 23 March 1918, the Commander of German 68th Corps declared the just formed Estonian army illegal. The arrests of the leaders of the national independence movement started in June 1918. A leader of the Estonian provisional government Konstantin Päts was arrested, deported and imprisoned in Germany. During this whole period the Estonian Salvation Committee continued its underground activities, entering into diplomatic relations with the Western Allied powers. Great Britain recognised Estonian independence (de facto) on May 3, 1918, followed by France on May 18, and Italy on 29 May 1918, giving the committee a legal status of the representative of the Estonian nation.

After the German Revolution, between 11 and 14 November 1918, the representatives of Germany formally handed over political power in Estonia to the national government. As the departure of German troops in November 1918 left a void, the Russian Bolshevik troops invaded Estonia triggering the 1918-1920 Estonian War of Independence. On 2 February 1920, the Peace Treaty of Tartu was signed by the Republic of Estonia and Bolshevist Russia. The Republic of Estonia obtained international recognition and became a member of the League of Nations in 1921.

== Ober Ost ==
Tallinn, Tartu, and Narva were placed direct under the German military administration (Ober Ost), but the rest of the country was divided and administered as Amtsbezirks and smaller Ortsbezirks. Usually, representatives of the Baltic German nobility (Baltic German feudal landowners) were appointed as local heads of administration. All Estonian language newspapers, except the German-minded Rewaler Tagesblatt / Tallinna Päevaleht were forbidden. This situation lasted until November 10, 1918. Germany denounced the Treaty of Brest-Litovsk with all its (then secret) additional protocols on 5 November 1918. August Winnig, the last German representative in Estonia signed the treaty with the Estonian Provisional Government on November 19, 1918, giving all the administration power to the Estonian Provisional Government. Soviet Russia invaded Estonia on November 28, 1918, starting the Estonian War of Independence.

== German military administrators ==
Three German military administrations (Etappenverwaltungen) – Estonia, Livonia and Ösel – were set up as German advance progressed. The military administrators were at first subordinated to the Ober Ost 1917–1918 and then to the Head of the Military Administration of the Baltic Lands.

=== Estonia ===
Head of the Administration Verwaltungschefs

=== Ösel ===
(for the West Estonian archipelago (Moonsund archipelago), Ösel being the German name for Saaremaa, the major island)

Head of the Military Administration Verwaltungschefs

- October 1917 – February 1918 Gen. Franz Adolf, Freiherr von Seckendorff (1857)
- March 1918 – November 1918 Gen. ... von Balk
- 1918 – Gen. Franz Adolf, Freiherr von Seckendorff
