= Estonian Salvation Committee =

Executive body of Estonian Provincial Assembly in 1918

The Estonian Salvation Committee (Estonian: Eestimaa Päästekomitee or Päästekomitee) was the executive body of the Estonian Provincial Assembly that issued the Estonian Declaration of Independence.

The Salvation Committee was created on February 19, 1918, by the Provincial Assembly in a situation where Russian forces were retreating and forces of Imperial Germany were advancing in Estonia during World War I. The committee was granted full decision-making powers to ensure the continued activity of the Provincial Assembly. The members of the Salvation Committee were Konstantin Päts, Jüri Vilms and Konstantin Konik. It drafted a declaration of independence that was approved by elders of the Provincial Assembly. The Salvation Committee publicly proclaimed Estonia an independent and democratic republic on February 24 in Tallinn. The committee appointed the Estonian Provisional Government on February 24, 1918.

== See also ==
- Estonian Provincial Assembly
- History of Estonia
- Estonian Declaration of Independence
