= List of members of the Asutav Kogu =

Members list of Estonian Constituent Assembly of 1919-20

The following is a list of members of the Estonian Constituent Assembly (Asutav Kogu) of 1919–20. The Russian Provisional Government created the Autonomous Governorate of Estonia in April 1917 and decreed that it should have its own governor and an elected Provincial Assembly, which convened in July 1917. On 28 November that year, it declared its laws sovereign over Estonia, but the Bolsheviks led by Jaan Anvelt occupied Tallinn (Estonia's capital) and declared the Provincial Assembly dissolved; as they retreated in February 1918, the Estonian Salvation Committee issued the Estonian Declaration of Independence. Soon afterwards, however, German forces occupied Estonia, a situation made formal under the Treaty of Brest-Litovsk; after Germany's withdrawal at the end of the First World War in November 1918, a Provisional Government proclaimed independence, but the Soviet Russian Red Army occupied Estonia shortly afterwards, triggering the Estonian War of Independence. Only once the Red Army had been expelled from the region in February 1919 could the Provincial Assembly (still technically sitting) establish a Constituent Assembly "to lay the foundations for Estonian statehood [and] to adopt the Constitution". The Assembly sat between 23 April 1919 and 20 December 1920, following elections held on 5–7 April 1919. It ratified the 1st Constitution of Estonia which provided for a new legislative chamber: the Riigikogu.

== List of members ==
Source: Jaan Toomla, Valitud ja Valitsenud: Eesti parlamentaarsete ja muude esinduskogude ning valitsuste isikkoosseis aastail 1917–1999 (National Library of Estonia, 1999), pp. 25–32.

Name	Party	Notes
Juhan Mihkel Ainson	ER	Left office 18.12.1919, replaced by Juhan Ostrat
Jaan Ammermann	ESDTP	
Ado Anderkopp	ETE	
Alma Anvelt-Ostra (or Oinas)	ESDTP	
August Arras	ETE	Left office 16.10.1919; replaced by Theodor Käärik
Emma Asson (Petersen)	ESDTP	
Karl Ast (or Rumor)	ESDTP	
Alma Ast-Anni	ESDTP	Took office 28.05.1920; replaced Eduard Vilde
Robert Astrem (or Aström)	ESDTP	Left office 23.04.1920; replaced by Gustav Küjen
Marie Helene Aul	ESDTP	Left office 12.05.1919; replaced by Karl Lukk
Eduard Georg Aule	EMRL	Left office 23.04.1919; replaced by Jaan Raamot
Kaarel August Baars	ETE	
Adam Bachmann (or Randalu)	ER	
Ado Birk	ER	
Eduard Birkenberg	ER	Took office 12.12.1919, replacing Peeter Põld; left office 21.10.1920 and replaced by Gustav Seen
Max Woldemar Gustav Ed. Bock	SEE	
Christian Brüller	EMRL	Took office 28.09.1920, replacing Heinrich Tats
Karl Einbund (or Eenpalu)	ER	Took office 26.04.1919, replacing Jaan Masing
August Ehrlich	ER	Took office 27.08.1919, replacing Jaan Mägi
Johan Epner	ESDTP	Took office on 04.02.1920, replacing Nikolai Köstner; left office on 31.07.1920 and replaced by Verner Nerep
Johannes Ernesaks	ESDTP	
Villem Ernits	ESDTP	
Karl Oskar Freiberg (or Kurmiste)	(ESRP)EISTP	Took office on 07.09.1920, replacing Johannes Semper
Julius Grünberg (or Tarmisto)	EMRL	Left office 23.04.1919; replaced by Kristjan Haho
Timotheus Grünthal	ETE	
Gustav Arnold Grünvald (or Grünvaldt)	ESDTP	Left office 14.11.1919; replaced by Jaan Pakk
Kristjan Haho	EMRL	Took office on 23.04.1919, replacing Julius Grünberg
Voldemar Hammer	ESDTP	Left office 30.06.1919; replaced by Jakob Mikiver
Eduard Hubel	ER	Left office 23.04.1919; replaced by Johannes Reinthal
Jaan Hünerson	EMRL	
Karl Inglist	ESDTP	
Karl Ipsberg	EMRL	
Jüri Jaakson	ER	
Johan Jans	ESDTP	
Aleksander Janson (or Alumäe)	(ESRP)EISTP	Took office 10.10.2019, replacing Andres Loorits
Leopold Johannes Johanson	ESDTP	
Peet Johanson	ETE	
Erich Joonas (or Jonas)	(ESRP)EISTP	
Mihkel Juhkam	ETE	Left office 03.11.1919; replaced by Ferdinand Peterson
Jaan Järve	ER	Took office 27.09.1919, replacing Hans Priimägi
August Jürman (or Jürmann/Jürima)	EMRL	
Tõnis Kalbus	ETE	
Oskar Philipp Kallas	ER	Left office 21.05.1919; replaced by Aleksander Schipai
Nikolai Kann	KRE	
Eduard Kansman (or Kansa)	ETE	Took office 5.11.1919, replacing Johannes Zimmermann; left office 16.03.1920 and replaced by Madis Käbin
Artur Kaplur	ESDTP	
Aleksander Leon Richard Kapp	KRE	Took office 30.07.1919, replacing Johann Kõpp
Peeter Karin (or Karrin)	ESDTP	Left office 15.04.1920 and replaced by Johannes Rätsep
Juhan Kartau	ESDTP	
Hugo Bernhard Kikson	ESDTP	
Karl-Bernhard Kirp	ER	Left office 09.03.1920, replacing Jaan Poska; left office 11.03.1920 and replaced by Jakob Ploompuu
Hermann Koch	SEE	
Theodor Koik	ESRP	Left office 02.05.1919 and replaced by Jaan Piiskar
Rudolf Koil	ESDTP	Took office 17.12.1919, replacing August Reeben
Konstantin Konik	ETE	
Karl-Ferdinand Kornel	ER	
Hans Kruus	(ESRP)EISTP	
Juhan Kukk	ETE	
Minni Kurs-Olesk	ESDTP	
Hugo Kuusner	ER	
Johann Kõpp	KRE	Left office 29.07.1919; replaced by Aleksander Kapp
Madis Käbin	ETE	Took office 17.03.1920, replacing Eduard Kansman
Jaan Kärner	(ESRP)EISTP	
Theodor Käärik	ETE	Took office 17.10.1919, replacing August Arras
Nikolai Köstner	ESDTP	Left office 03.02.1920; replaced by Johan Epner
Eduard Kübarsepp	ER	Took office 24.01.1920, replacing Harald Normak
Gustav Küjen	ESDTP	Took office 24.04.1920, replacing Robert Astrem; died in office 17.08.1920 and replaced on 18.08.1920 by Johannes Põllupüü
Anton Laar	KRE	Left office 17.11.1919 and replaced by Hans Leesment
Jaan Lattik	KRE	
Hans Leesment	KRE	Took office 18.11.1919, replacing Anton Laar
Johannes Lehtman	ETE	Left office 06.10.1919; replaced by Jakob Sõnajalg
Jaan Letner	ESDTP	Left office 23.04.1919; replaced by Tõnu Talbak
Jakob Lindros	ESDTP	
Tõnu Loik	ETE	
Peeter Londo	ESDTP	Took office 23.04.1919, replacing Georg Puusepp
Andres Loorits	ESRP	Left office 09.10.1919 and replaced by Aleksander Janson
Karl Michael Lukk	ESDTP	Took office 13.05.1919, replacing Marie Helene Aul
Jaan Lõo	ER	Left office 16.12.1919 and replaced by Harald Normak
Nikolai Maim	ER	Took office 25.07.1919, replacing Karl Väli
Anton Martinson	ESDTP	Died in office 17.06.1919; replaced by Märt Raud on 18.06.1919
Hans Martna	ESDTP	
Mihkel Martna	ESDTP	Left office 26.04.1919; replaced by Karl Einbund
Jaan Masing	ER	
Hans Mets	ESDTP	
Jaan Mets	ETE	
Johannes Meier (or Meyer)	SEE	Left office 26.01.1920; replaced by George Stackelberg
Jakob Mikiver	ESDTP	Took office 01.07.1919, replacing Voldemar Hammer
Jaan Mägi	ER	Left office 26.08.1919; replaced by August Ehrlich
Mihkel Neps	ESDTP	
Verner Nerep	ESDTP	Took office 07.09.1920, replacing Johan Epner
Eduard Nipmann	ESDTP	
Harald Normak	ER	Took office 17.12.1919, replacing Jaan Lõo; left office 23.01.1920 and replaced by Eduard Kübarsepp
Hans Nurk	ESDTP	
Mats Nõges	ER	
Aleksander Oinas	ESDTP	
Lui Olesk	ETE	
August Onton	ESDTP	
Hans Orav	ETE	Took office 07.10.1919, replacing Aleksander Velvelt
Juhan Ostrat	ER	Took office 19.12.1919, replacing Johan Ainson; left office 22.01.1920 and replaced on 23.01.1920 by Jaan Sitska
Johannes Paalberg	ER	Left office 11.05.1919 and replaced by Julius Reintam
Jaan Pakk	ESDTP	Took office 15.11.1919, replacing Gustav Grünvald
Kaarel Parts	ER	Left office 11.12.1919 and replaced by Heinrich Tats
Christoph Peiker	ETE	
Ferdinand Peterson (or Petersen)	ETE	Took office 04.11.1919, replacing Mihkel Juhkam
Ants Piip	ETE	
Jaan Piiskar	(ESRP)EISTP	Took office 03.05.1919, replacing Theodor Koik
Johan Pitka	ER	Left office 28.05.1919 and replaced by August Sternfeldt
Jakob Ploompuu	ER	Took office 12.03.1920, replacing Karl Kirp
Johann Ploompuu	ER	
Theodor Pool	ETE	
Jaan Poska	ER	Died in office 07.03.1920 and replaced on 09.03.1920 by Karl Kirp
Helmi Press-Jansen	ESDTP	
Hans Priimägi	ER	Took office 22.05.1919, replacing Jaan Uri; left office 26.08.1919 and replaced by Jaan Järve
Jakob Puss	ESDTP	Took office 24.10.1919, replacing Tõnu Talbak
Georg Puusepp	ESDTP	Left office 23.04.1919 and replaced by Peeter Londo
Peeter Siegfried Põld	ER	Left office 11.12.1919 and replaced by Eduard Birkenberg
Johannes Põllupüü	ESDTP	Took office 18.08.1920, replacing Gustav Küjen
Johanna Päts	ETE	
Konstantin Päts	EMRL	
Voldemar Päts	ETE	
Hans Pöhl	KRE	
Mait Püümann (or Püümets)	ESDTP	
Jaan Raamot	EMRL	Took office 23.04.1919, replacing Eduard Aule
Karl Rand	ESDTP	Took office 05.05.1920, replacing Johannes Rätsep
Nikolai Raps	ESDTP	Took office 24.10.1919, replacing Jüri Uustalu; left office 13.11.1919 and replaced by August Reeben
Anton Ratasepp	ESDTP	Took office 09.08.1919, replacing August Tibar
Märt Raud	ESDTP	Took office 18.06.1919, replacing Anton Martinson
Hugo Raudsepp	(ESRP)EISTP	
August Reeben	ESDTP	Took office 14.11.1919, replacing Nikolai Raps; left office on 16.12.1919 and replaced by Rudolf Koil
August Rei	ESDTP	
Julius Reintam	ER	Took office 12.05.1919, replacing Johannes Paalberg
Johannes Reinthal (or Reintalu)	ER	Took office 23.04.1919, replacing Eduard Hubel
Marie Reisik	ER	
Eduard Rosenvald	ER	
Peeter Ruubel	ETE	Took office 07.10.1919, replacing Karl Saar
Johannes Rätsep	ESDTP	Took office 16.04.1920, replacing Peeter Karin; left office 04.05.1920 and replaced by Karl Rand
Karl-August Saar	ETE	Left office 06.10.1919 and replaced by Peeter Ruubel
Aleksander Schipai (or Šipai)	ER	Took office 22.05.1919, replacing Oskar Kallas
Arnold Paul Schulbach (or Süvalep)	ETE	
Gustav Seen	ER	Took office 22.10.1920, replacing Eduard Birkenberg
Julius Seljamaa	ETE	
Johannes Semper	(ESRP)EISTP	Left office 06.09.1920 and replaced by Karl Freiberg
Jaan Sitska	ER	Took office 23.01.1920, replacing Juhan Ostrat
Aleksei Sorokin	VKK	
Georg Rudolf Stackelberg	SEE	Took office 27.01.1920, replacing Johannes Meyer
August Voldemar Sternfeldt	ER	Took office 29.05.1919, replacing Johan Pitka
Otto August Strandman	ETE	
Jakob Sõnajalg	ETE	Took office 07.10.1919, replacing Johannes Lehtman
Eduard Säkk	ETE	
Johannes-Friedrich Zimmermann	ETE	Left office 04.11.1919 and replaced by Eduard Kansman
Tõnu Talbak	ESDTP	Took office 23.04.1919, replacing Jaan Letner; left office 25.10.1919 and replaced by Jakob Puss
Nikolai Talts	ETE	
Heinrich Tats	EMRL	Took office 12.12.1919, replacing Kaarel Parts; left office 27.09.1920 and replaced by Christjan Brüller
Jaan Teemant	EMRL	
Anna Tellman (or Tõrvand)	ETE	Took office 07.10.1919, replacing Mihkel Varrik; left office 08.08.1919 and replaced by Anton Ratasepp
August Tibar	ESDTP	
Viktor Tomberg (or Tarmas)	ETE	
Karl Heinrich Tomingas		
Aleksander Tulp	ESDTP	
Jaan Tõnisson	ER	
Artur Uibopuu	ER	
Jüri Uluots	EMRL	
Jaan Uri	ER	Left office 21.05.1919 and replaced by Hans Priimägi
Jüri Uustalu	ESDTP	Left office 23.10.1919 and replaced by Nikolai Raps
Jaan Vain	ESDTP	
Mihkel Varrik	ETE	Left office 06.10.1919 and replaced by Anna Temman
Aleksander August Veiderman (or Veiderma)	ETE	
Aleksander Veiler	ETE	
Aleksander Velvelt	ETE	Left office 06.10.1919 and replaced by Hans Orav
Arnold Vesterberg	ESDTP	
Jakob Westholm	ER	
Eduard Vilde	ESDTP	Left office 27.05.1920 and replaced by Alma Ast-Anni
Karl Virma	ESDTP	
Karl Väli	ER	Left office 24.07.1919 and replaced by Nikolai Maim
