= Kulli =

Kulli may refer to:

== Places ==
=== Estonia ===
- Kulli, Harju County, a village
- Kulli, Pärnu County, a village
- Kulli, Tartu County, a village
- Kulli, Valga County, a village
- Kärla-Kulli, a village known as Kulli until 2014
- Lümanda-Kulli, village known as Kulli until 2014

=== Iran ===
- Kulli, Iran, a village in East Azerbaijan Province

== Other uses ==
- Simon Kulli (1973–2025), Albanian Roman Catholic bishop
- Külli, an Estonian feminine given name
- Kulli culture, prehistoric culture in what is now southern Balochistan, Pakistan
- A Finnish profanity
