= Külli =

Female given name

- Gender: Female
- Language: Estonian
- Name day: 8 December

Origin
- Region of origin: Estonia

Other names
- Related names: Küllike, Külliki, Külve, Külvi (Estonian); Kyllikki (Finnish)

Külli is an Estonian feminine given name. The name is often a diminutive of the given name Küllike/Külliki.

As of 1 January 2021, 2,053 women in Estonia have the first name Külli, making it the 82nd most popular female name in the country. The name is most commonly found in Võru County, where 40.73 per 10,000 inhabitants of the county bear the name. Individuals bearing the name Külli include:

- Külli Hallik (born 1954), Estonian skier and coach
- Külli Kaljus (born 1973), Estonian orienteer and runner
- Külli Palmsaar (born 1966), Estonian actress
- Külli Reinumägi (born 1974), Estonian actress
- Külli Teetamm (born 1976), Estonian actress
- Külli Tomingas (born 1972), Estonian opera singer

== See also ==
- Eve-Külli Kala (born 1959), Estonian diplomat
