= Kübarsepp =

Family name

Origin
- Language: Estonian
- Meaning: hat maker
- Region of origin: Estonia

Kübarsepp is an Estonian occupational surname meaning "hat maker"; a compound of kübar (hat) and sepp (smith). As of 1 January 2026, 114 men and 116 women have the surname Kübarsepp in Estonia. Kübarsepp ranks 671st for men and 741st for women in the distribution of surnames in the country. The surname Kübarsepp is the most common in Lääne County, where 6.38 per 10,000 inhabitants of the county bear the surname.

People bearing the surname Kübarsepp include:

- Eduard Kübarsepp (1877–1962), Estonian politician
- Jakob Kübarsepp (born 1947), Estonian engineer and materials scientist
- Kadi Kübarsepp (born 1982), Estonian metal and graphic artist
- Külliki Kübarsepp (born 1981), Estonian political scientist and politician
- Raul Kübarsepp (born 19750, Estonian computer game developer, conservationist and social activist
