= Mikiver =

Mikiver is an Estonian surname. Notable people with the surname include:

- Carmen Mikiver (born 1964), Estonian actress
- Jakob Mikiver (1881–1964), Estonian politician and watchmaker
- Mikk Mikiver (1937–2006), Estonian actor and theater director
- Tõnu Mikiver (1943–2017), Estonian actor
