= Talts =

Family name

Talts is an Estonian surname. Notable people with the surname include:

- Evelin Talts (born 1977), Estonian long-distance runner
- Jaan Talts (born 1944), Estonian weightlifter
- Janar Talts (born 1983), Estonian basketball player
- Nikolai Talts (1890–1949), Estonian lawyer and politician
