= Ratasepp =

Ratasepp is a surname. Notable people with the surname include:

- Anton Ratasepp, Estonian politician
- Katariina Ratasepp (born 1986), Estonian actress
- Ursula Ratasepp (born 1982), Estonian actress
