= Amerman =

Amerman is a surname of Dutch origin, or an Americanized version of Ammermann. Notable people with the surname include:

- Bill Amerman (born 1953), American politician
- Lemuel Amerman (1846–1897), American politician
- Marcus Amerman (born 1959), Choctaw bead artist, glass artist, painter, fashion designer, and performance artist
