= Käärik =

Käärik is an Estonian surname. Notable people with the surname include:

- Aino Käärik (1918–2021), Estonian botanist and microbiologist
- Theodor Käärik (1889–1940), Estonian politician
