= Johannes Paalberg =

Estonian politician (1883–1949)

Johannes Paalberg (25 January 1883 Liigvalla Parish, Järva County - 10 October 1949 Väinjärve Parish, Järva County) was an Estonian politician. He was a member of Estonian Constituent Assembly. On 11 May 1919, he resigned his position and he was replaced by Julius Reintam.
