= August Maramaa =

Estonian politician (1881–1941)

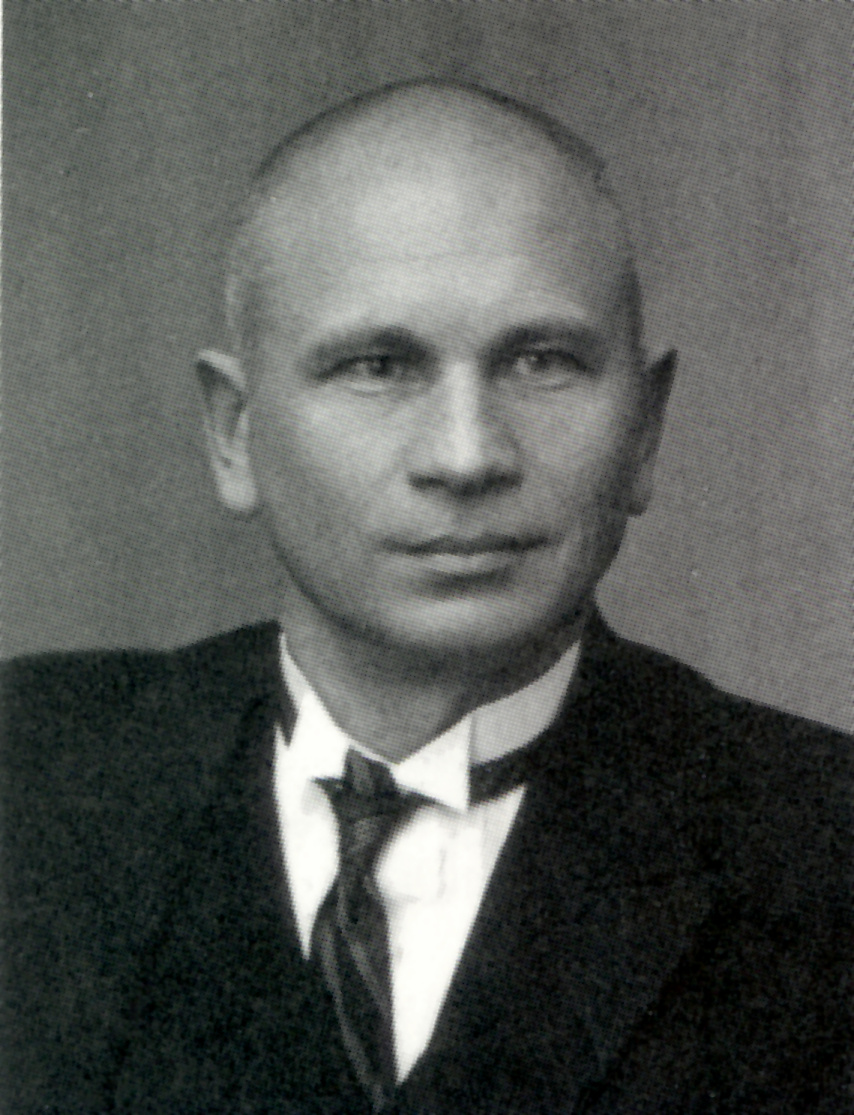
August Maramaa

August Maramaa (before 1922 August Marfeldt; 6 April 1881 Aakre Parish, Tartu County – 26 December 1941 Vyatski Prison Camp, Kirov, Russia) was an Estonian politician, teacher and mayor of Viljandi from 1919 to 1921 and 1927-1939.

He graduated in 1902. He worked as a teacher and school leader in Viljandi Country and Viljandi. He published mathematics textbooks.

He was a member of I Riigikogu. On 15 September, he resigned his position and he was replaced by Aleksander Tulp. Maramaa was Mayor of Viljandi from 1919 until 1921, and again from 1927 until 1939.

On January 8, 1941, he was arrested by the NKVD and deported to the Vyatski Prison Camp in Kirov, Russia, where he died on December 26 the same year.

== Personal ==
Maramaa married Anna Roosson in 1909 (Anna Maramma, deported in June 1941) and had five children.

His son Harri Haamer was a teacher at St. Jacob's Congregation, Tartu Paulus Congregation, Tarvastu Peetri Congregation and Kõpu Peetri Congregations. His grandson Eenok Haamer is a teacher at Mustvee and Lohusuu Congregations and his granddaughter Maarja Haamer-Render is an Estonian singer. His brother was the chemist Jaan Maramaa.

== Recognition ==
- 1938 Order of the Estonian Red Cross III class

== Commemoration ==
A sculpture of August Maramaa was opened next to Viljandi Town Hall in 2007. August Maramaa Puiestee (Boulevard) is also located in Viljandi.
