= Johannes Rätsep =

Estonian politician

Johannes Rätsep (1878 Mahu Parish, Virumaa - ?) was an Estonian politician. He was a member of Estonian Constituent Assembly. He was a member of the assembly since 16 April 1920. He replaced Peeter Karin. On 4 May 1920, he resigned his position and he was replaced by Karl Rand.
