= Äntu Landscape Conservation Area =

Nature reserve in Estonia

- Location within Estonia
- Location: Estonia
- Coordinates: 59°03′N 26°15′E
- Area: 391 ha (970 acres)
- Established: 1978 (2005)

Äntu Landscape Conservation Area (Estonian: Äntu Maastikukaitseala) is a nature reserve situated in Lääne-Viru County, Estonia.

Its area is 391 ha.

The protected area was designated in 1978 to protect Äntu lakes and its surroundings. In 2005, the protected area was redesigned to the landscape conservation area.
