= Emma Asson =

Estonian politician (1889–1965)

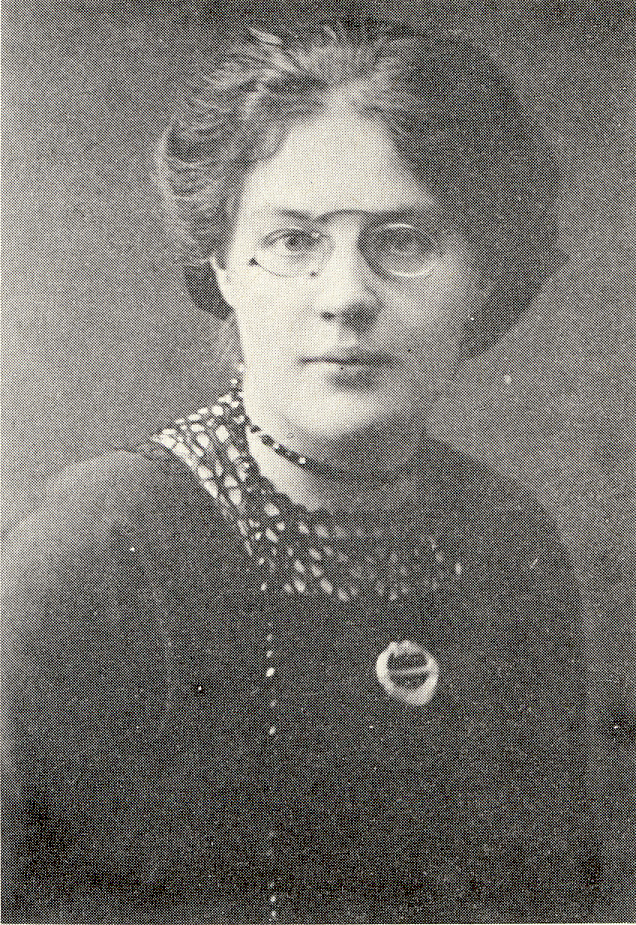
Emma Asson

Emma Asson (13 July 1889 – 1 January 1965) was an Estonian politician (Social Democrat). She was the first woman to be elected to the Estonian parliament. Asson participated in the creation of the first constitution of independent Estonia, particularly regarding education and gender equality. She also wrote one of the first history textbooks in Estonian in 1912.

== Biography ==
Emma Asson was born in Vaabina Parish, Võru County, Governorate of Livonia, part of the Russian Empire, as the daughter of a teacher. She studied at the A. S. Pushkin Girls' School in Tartu and graduated in history from the Bestuzhev Courses in Saint Petersburg in Russia in 1910. She was then employed as a history teacher at a girls' college in Tartu.

Emma Asson was active in various women's organisations for social and education issues. In 1919, she was elected to the Tallinn city council, she was also elected to the first national parliament of independent Estonia as a Social Democrat. In 1920, the women of Estonia were given full political rights under a new constitution. Two women were consulted over this constitution: Minni Kurs-Olesk and Asson. She was a member of the Education Ministry from 1919 to 1921, secretary of the Estonian Women's Association, and the head of the Education Department from 1925 to 1940.

She was married to the politician Ferdinand Petersen from 1921 to 1941.
