= Harald Normak =

Estonian politician (1890–1957)

Harald Normak (20 December 1890 Kohtla Parish, Virumaa – 14 December 1957 Uppsala, Sweden) was an Estonian politician. He was a member of Estonian Constituent Assembly. He was a member of the assembly since 17 December 1919. He replaced Jaan Lõo. On 23 January 1920, he resigned his position and he was replaced by Eduard Kübarsepp.
