= Karl Inglist =

Estonian politician (1874–1951)

Karl Gustav Inglist (30 January 1874 in Äntu – 18 November 1951 in Ambla) was an Estonian politician. He was a member of Estonian Constituent Assembly.
