= Madis Käbin =

Estonian politician (1877–1954)

Madis Käbin (25 March 1877 Kohtla Parish (now Toila Parish), Kreis Wierland – 24 October 1954 Tallinn) was an Estonian politician. In 1920, representing the Estonian Labour Party, he replaced Eduard Kansman as a member of Estonian Constituent Assembly.
