= Ea Jansen =

Estonian historian (1921-2005)

Ea Jansen in 1978

Ea Jansen (14 November 1921 Tallinn, Estonia – 20 April 2005 Tallinn, Estonia) was an Estonian historian of Finno-Ugric history. She was the daughter of the Estonian feminist Helmi Press-Jansen and painter August Jansen. Until her death, she worked for Tallinn Pedagogical University. She graduated from Tallinn 9th Secondary School in 1941 and studied at the University of Tartu from 1942 to 1949, where she graduated with a degree in history.

== Selected works ==
- 1998, "From an Ethnic Community to National Statehood: The Case of Estonians" (article)
