= Tooming =

Family name

Origin
- Language: Estonian
- Meaning: "bird cherry" (Prunus padus)
- Region of origin: Estonia

Other names
- Variant forms: Toomingas, Tomingas, Toming

Tooming is an Estonian surname derived from toomingas, meaning "bird cherry" (Prunus padus). As of 1 January 2021, 244 men and 263 women have the surname Tooming in Estonia. In terms of the distribution of surnames, Tooming ranks 206th for men and 221st for women. The surname is most commonly found in Jõgeva County, where 47.10 per 10,000 inhabitants of the county bear the name.

Notable people bearing the surname Tooming include:

- Alfred Tooming (1907–1977), Lutheran archbishop
- Jaan Tooming (born 1946), actor, theatre and film director and writer
- Osvald Tooming (1914–1992), journalist and writer
- Peeter Tooming (1939–1997), photographer, documentary film director and journalist
