= August Onton =

Estonian politician (1881–1965)

August Onton (24 October 1881 Kohtla Parish, Virumaa - 14 August 1965 Kohtla-Järve) was an Estonian politician. He was a member of Estonian Constituent Assembly.
