= Kristjan Haho =

Estonian politician (1877–1937)

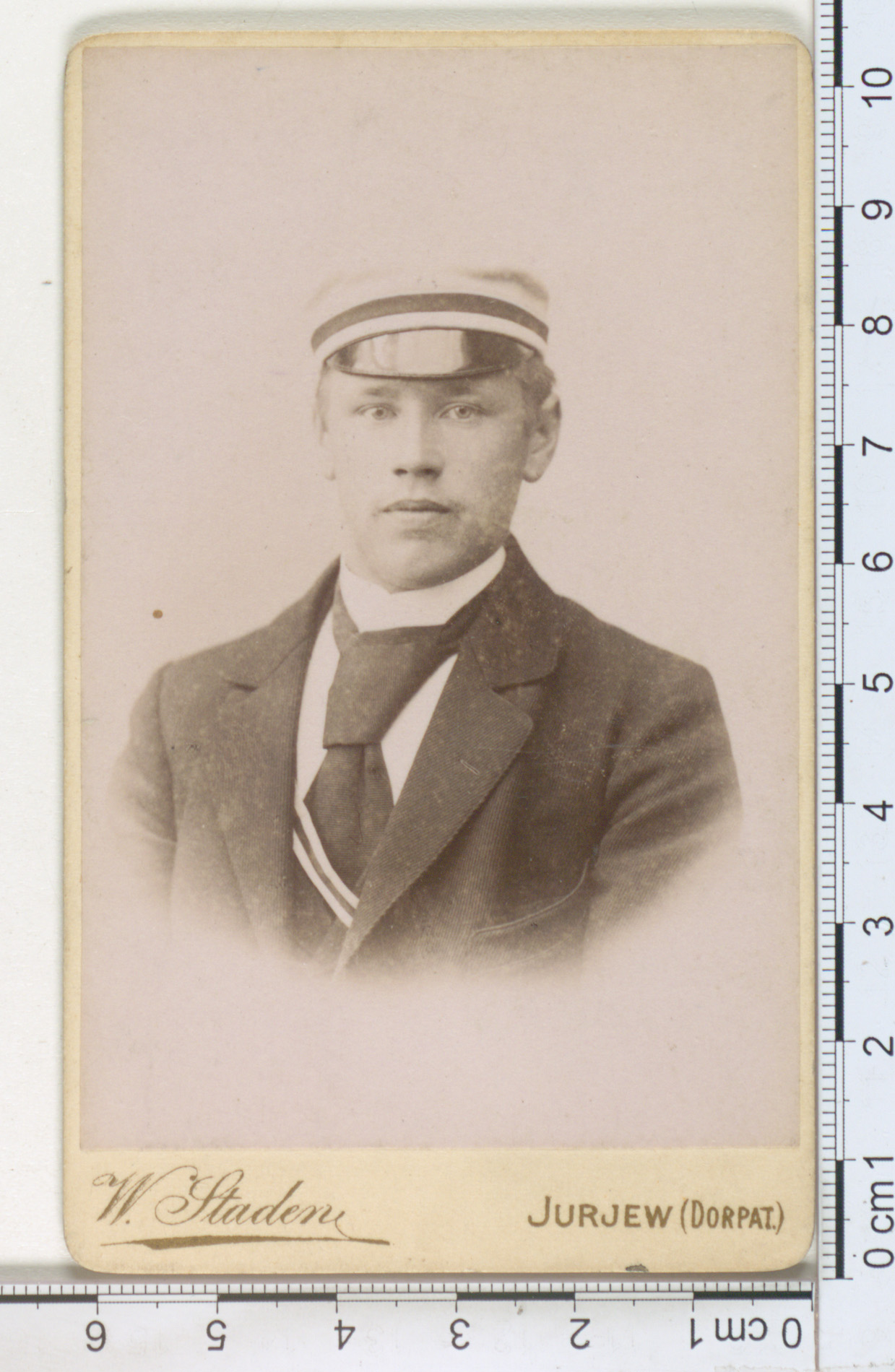

Kristjan Haho (also Kristjaan Haho; 5 February 1877 – 18 December 1937) was an Estonian lawyer, judge and politician. He was a member of Estonian Constituent Assembly. He was a member of the assembly since 23 April 1919. He replaced Julius Grünberg.

Haho was born in Oonurme. He graduated in 1913 from the Faculty of Law at the University of Tartu. He worked as a lawyer in Rakvere and Tallinn, a justice of the peace in Tallinn in 1919, a member of the Constituent Assembly, and a judge in Tallinn from 1920 until 1932. In 1935, he returned to his home village of Oonurme, where he died in to 1937. He is buried in Rakvere City Cemetery.
