= Karl-August Saar =

Estonian politician (1887–1941)

Karl-August Saar (12 August 1887 in Vao Parish, Virumaa – 30 November 1941 in Sverdlovsk Oblast, Russia) was an Estonian politician. He was a member of Estonian Constituent Assembly. On 6 October 1919, he resigned his position and he was replaced by Peeter Ruubel.
