= Mart Raud =

Mart Raud and Märt Raud may refer to:

- Mart Raud (writer) (1903–1980), Estonian writer
- Märt Raud (writer) (1881–1980), Estonian writer
- Märt Raud (engineer) (1878–1952), Estonian engineer, politician
