= Marie Helene Aul =

Estonian politician (1893–1955)

Marie Helene Aul (6 March 1893 Tallinn – 1955 Tallinn) was an Estonian politician. She was a member of Estonian Constituent Assembly, representing the Estonian Social Democratic Workers' Party. On 12 May 1919, she resigned her post and was replaced by Karl Michael Lukk.
