= Anton Martinson =

Estonian politician (1883–1919)

Anton Martinson (1883 Uulu Parish, Pärnu County – 17 June 1919) was an Estonian politician. He was a member of Estonian Constituent Assembly. On about 18 June 1919, he resigned his position and he was replaced by Märt Raud.
