= Ernesaks =

Ernesaks is an Estonian surname. Notable people with the surname include:

- Gustav Ernesaks (1908–1993), Estonian composer and choir conductor
- Gustav Ernesaks (weightlifter) (1896–1932), Estonian weightlifter
- Johannes Ernesaks (1876–1952), Estonian politician
