= Loorits =

Loorits is an Estonian surname. Notable people with the surname include:

- Andres Loorits (1869–1941), Estonian politician
- Oskar Loorits (1900–1961), Estonian folklorist
