= Jaan Mägi =

Estonian politician (1883–1939)

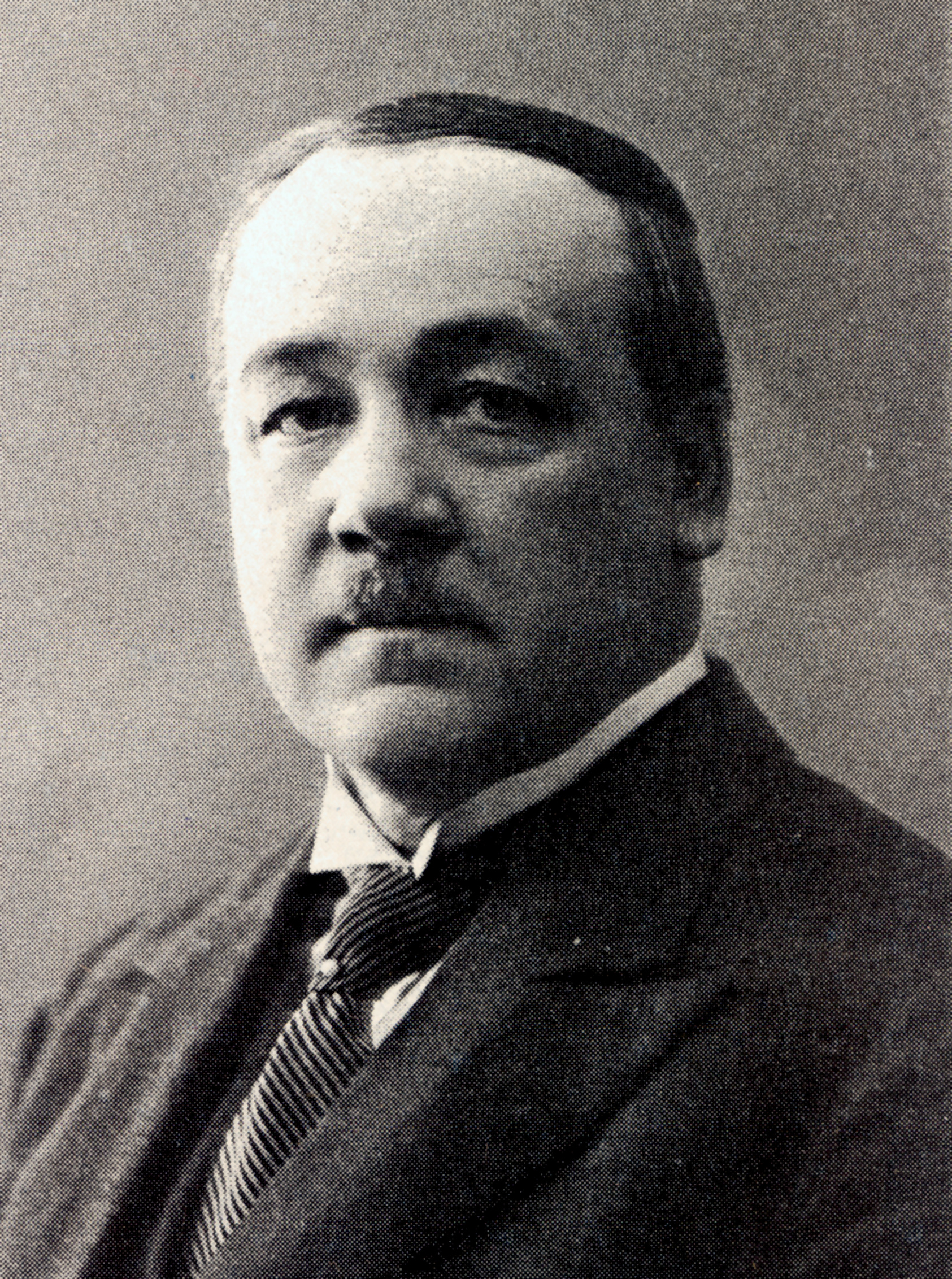
Jaan Mägi

Jaan Mägi (26 July 1883 Tarvastu Parish, Viljandi County – 25 July 1939 Elva) was an Estonian politician. He was a member of Estonian Constituent Assembly. On 26 August 1919, he resigned his position and he was replaced by August Ehrlich.
