= Tomingas =

Family name

Tomingas is an Estonian surname. Notable people with the surname include:

- Karl Heinrich Tomingas (1892–1969), Estonian politician
- Kärt Tomingas (1967–2025), Estonian actress, singer, and lecturer
- Külli Tomingas (born 1972), Estonian opera singer
- Tuuli Tomingas (born 1995), Estonian biathlete
