= Johanna Päts =

Estonian politician (1890–1977)

Johanna Päts (17 December 1890 Tallinn – 13 November 1977 Toronto) was an Estonian politician. She was a member of Estonian Constituent Assembly.
