= Erich Joonas =

Estonian politician (1893–1944)

Erich Joonas (also Erich Jonas; 26 April 1893 Kavastu Parish (now Peipsiääre Parish), Kreis Dorpat – 26 May 1944 Viljandi) was an Estonian politician. He was a member of Estonian Constituent Assembly.
