= Christoph Peiker =

Estonian politician (1888–1924)

Christoph Peiker (29 December 1888 – 15 July 1924, in Tallinn) was an Estonian politician. He was a member of the Estonian Constituent Assembly.
