= Peeter Londo =

Estonian politician

Peeter Londo (7 January 1879– 16 July 1947) was an Estonian politician. He was a member of Estonian Constituent Assembly. He was a member of the assembly since 23 April 1919. He replaced Georg Puusepp.
