= Julius Tarmisto =

Estonian politician

Julius Tarmisto (or Julius Grünberg; 14 December 1890 Otepää – 4 September 1956 Tallinn) was an Estonian politician. He was a member of the Estonian Constituent Assembly. On 23 April 1919, he resigned his position and he was replaced by Kristjan Haho.
