= Jakob Ploompuu =

Estonian journalist, publisher, and politician

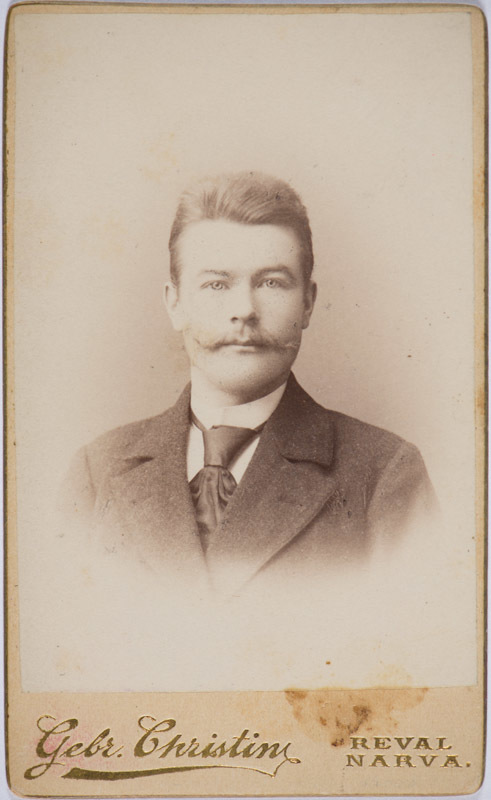
Jakob Ploompuu

Jakob Ploompuu (11 October 1872, Koitjärve (now Kuusalu Parish), Kreis Harrien – 13 September 1948, Koitjärve) was an Estonian journalist, publisher and politician. He was a member of the Estonian Constituent Assembly. He became a member of the assembly on 12 March 1920. He replaced Karl Kirp. Jakob Ploompuu was the younger brother of Johann Ploompuu.
