= Johann Ploompuu =

Estonian politician (1867–1943)

Johann Ploompuu (4 August 1867 Kiiu Parish (now Kuusalu Parish), Kreis Harrien – 11 December 1943 Harku Parish, Harju County) was an Estonian politician. He was a member of the Estonian Constituent Assembly, representing the Estonian People's Party and of the II Riigikogu, representing the Farmers' Assemblies. He was the older brother of Jakob Ploompuu.
