= Nikolai Maim =

Estonian politician (1884–1976)

Nikolai Maim (26 February 1884 Tartu – 10 January 1976 Orangeburg, New York) was an Estonian politician. He was a member of Estonian Constituent Assembly. He was a member of the assembly since 25 July 1919. He replaced Karl Väli.
