= Helmi Press-Jansen =

Estonian politician and feminist

- Born: 15 March 1889; Fellin, Governorate of Livonia, Russian Empire
- Died: 5 March 1960 (aged 70); Tallinn, Estonia
- Occupation(s): Politician, feminist

Helmi Press-Jansen (15 March 1889 – 5 March 1960) was an Estonian journalist, translator and social democratic politician. She was a member of the Estonian Constituent Assembly. She was one of the organisers of the Estonian demonstration in Petrograd in 1917, which demanded autonomy For Estonia. Press-Jansen was a women's rights activist and a board member of the Union of Estonian Women's Organizations from 1923 to 1930. From 1919, a member of the first board of the Estonian Journalists' Union and 1940–41 commissar of the Tallinn Jewish Union Bank.
