= Tartu Eesti Naesterahva Selts =

Women's rights organization in Tartu, Estonia

Tartu Eesti Naesterahva Selts (Tartu Women's Society) was an Estonian organisation for women's rights, founded in 1907 in Tartu. It was the first women's rights organization in Estonia and in the Baltic states, and the only one prior to 1917.

As was the case in Latvia, women's rights had been a subject of public debate in the press since the 1880s, mainly in connection to the nationalism. As in the other Baltic countries however, no political organizations could exist prior to the introduction of Parliamentatism in Russia in 1905.

The Tartu Eesti Naesterahva Selts was formed to raise women's economical, moral and educational opportunities. It was the first organization to voice the subject of women's rights in Estonia. Its leading members were Leena Gross, Lilli Muna and Marie Reisik. The organization mainly focused on women's rights to university studies, access to professions and equal pay for equal work. Women students were allowed to audit university courses in 1905 and special courses were given for women from 1911 onward, but they were not allowed to study as full students prior to independence.

After the Russian revolution, a number of smaller women's groups were formed. Women in Russia and thus also in Estonia, which was then a part of Russia, were given suffrage, encouraged to join political parties and ran in the upcoming elections, and the Tartu Eesti Naesterahva Selts formed a political chapter. In order to unite the new women's associations in cooperation, it organized the first women's congress in Tartu in May 1917. At the congress, the umbrella organization Union of Estonian Women's Organizations was formed. Women's suffrage was introduced early after Estonian independence in 1918.
