= Alma Ast-Anni =

Estonian politician (1884–1958)

Alma Ast-Anni (12 December 1884, in Kaavere Parish (now Põltsamaa Parish, Kreis Fellin) – 30 October 1958, in Tallinn) was an Estonian politician. She was a member of the Estonian Constituent Assembly, representing the Estonian Social Democratic Workers' Party. She was a member of the assembly since 28 May 1920. She replaced Eduard Vilde.
