= Jüri Uustalu =

Estonian politician (1889–1973)

Jüri Uustalu (31 January 1889 in Voose – 25 November 1973 in Haapsalu) was an Estonian politician. He was a member of Estonian Constituent Assembly. On 23 October 1919, he resigned his position and he was replaced by Nikolai Raps.
