= August Tibar =

Estonian politician

August Tibar (24 July 1888, in Viljandi County – ?) was an Estonian politician. He was a member of Estonian Constituent Assembly. On 8 August 1919, he resigned his position and he was replaced by Anton Ratasepp.
