= Viktor Tarmas =

Estonian politician

Viktor Tarmas (also Viktor Tomberg; 19 November 1891 Tori Parish, Pärnu County - ?) was an Estonian politician. He was a member of Estonian Constituent Assembly.
