= Heinrich Tats =

Estonian politician

Heinrich Tats (26 February 1878 Abja-Vanamõisa Parish (now Mulgi Parish), Kreis Pernau - 15 May 1940 Rajangu Parish, Pärnu County) was an Estonian politician. He was a member of Estonian Constituent Assembly. He was a member of the assembly since 12 December 1919. He replaced Kaarel Parts. On 28 September, he resigned his position and he was replaced by Christian Brüller.
