= Eduard Säkk =

Estonian politician (1875–1943)

Eduard Säkk (1 February 1875 Narva – 12 October 1943 Novosibirsk Oblast, Russia) was an Estonian engineer, industrialist and politician. He was a member of Asutav Kogu.

Säkk was a member of the Estonian Constituent Assembly, Minister of Roads from 27 November 1918 until 8 May 1919, and again from 18 November 1919 to 30 July 1920. Following the Soviet occupation of Estonia in 1940, Säkk was arrested by the NKVD on 19 October 1940 in Nõmme and died in a prison camp in Russia.
