= Theodor Koik =

Estonian politician (1888–1941)

Theodor Koik (2 January 1888 Türi – 4 November 1941 Verkhoturye prison camp, Sverdlovsk Oblast, Russia) was an Estonian politician. He was a member of Estonian Constituent Assembly. On 2 May 1919, he resigned his position and he was replaced by Jaan Piiskar.
