= Mihkel Varrik =

Estonian politician (1879–1967)

Mihkel Varrik (also Mihkel Warrik; 9 September 1879 Rannu Parish, Tartu County - 8 January 1967 Toronto) was an Estonian politician. He was a member of Estonian Constituent Assembly. On 6 October 1919, he resigned his position and he was replaced by Anna Tellman.
