= Karl Väli =

Estonian politician (1882–1925)

Karl Johannes August Väli (22 January 1882, Rapla Parish, Harju County – May 1925 Tallinn) was an Estonian politician. He was a member of Estonian Constituent Assembly. On 24 July 1919, he resigned his position and he was replaced by Nikolai Maim.
