= Johannes Põllupüü =

Estonian politician (1889–1946)

Johannes Põllupüü (1 November 1889 Kiviloo, Harju County – 20 October 1946 Älmeboda, Sweden) was an Estonian politician. He was a member of Estonian Constituent Assembly. He was a member of the assembly since 18 August 1920. He replaced Gustav Küjen.
