= Jaan Sitska =

Estonian politician (1867–1937)

Jaan Sitska (16 February 1867 – 31 May 1937) was an Estonian politician and member of the Estonian Constituent Assembly.

== Biography ==
Sitska was born 16 February 1867 in Tali Parish, Pärnu County. He was a member of the Estonian Constituent Assembly from 23 January 1920, replacing Juhan Ostrat. He died 31 May 1937 in Tallinn.
