= Anna Tõrvand-Tellmann =

Estonian teacher, school director and politician

Anna Tõrvand-Tellmann (sometimes written as Tellman; 28 July 1886 – 23 August 1953 Molotovsk, Perm Oblast) was an Estonian politician. She was a member of Estonian Constituent Assembly. She became a member of the assembly on 7 October 1919. She replaced Mihkel Varrik.
