= Aleksander Janson =

Estonian politician (1881–1939)

Aleksander Janson (also Aleksander Alumäe; 15 May 1881 – 26 June 1939 Tartu) was an Estonian politician. He was a member of Estonian Constituent Assembly. He was a member of the assembly since 10 October 1919. He replaced Andres Loorits.
