= Anton Laar =

Estonian politician (1885–1933)

Anton Laar (13 June 1885 Võisiku Parish, Viljandi County – 23 February 1933 Tartu) was an Estonian politician. He was a member of Estonian Constituent Assembly. On 17 November 1919, he resigned his position and he was replaced by Hans Leesment.
