= Arnold Vesterberg =

Estonian politician (1878–1959)

Arnold Vesterberg (14 December 1878 – May 20, 1959) was an Estonian politician. He was a member of Estonian Constituent Assembly.

Vesterberg was born in Tallinn. He married Emilie N. Olson (1886–1953) and they had seven children. Vesterberg emigrated to the United States in 1924. He became a naturalized US citizen under the name Arnold Friedrich Westerberg in 1935 and lived in Detroit, Michigan, where he worked as an electrician. He died in 1959 and is buried in Glen Eden Memorial Park in Livonia, Michigan.
