= Jaan Letner =

Estonian politician (1887–1960)

Jaan Letner (22 December 1887 – 31 October 1960 Tallinn) was an Estonian politician. He was a member of Estonian Constituent Assembly. On 23 April 1919, he resigned his position and he was replaced by Tõnu Talbak.
