= Karl Rand =

Estonian politician

Karl Rand (1880 – ?) was an Estonian politician. He was a member of Estonian Constituent Assembly. He was a member of the assembly since 5 May 1920. He replaced Johannes Rätsep.
