= Johan Epner =

Estonian politician

Johan Epner (or Johannes Epner; born 1893) was an Estonian politician. He was a member of Estonian Constituent Assembly. He was a member of the assembly since 3 February 1920. He replaced Nikolai Köstner. On 31 July 1920, he resigned his post and he was replaced by Verner Nerep.
