= Jaan Mets =

Estonian politician (1891–1969)

Jaan Mets (2 January 1891 Vana-Kariste Parish, Pärnu County – 18 September 1969 Uppsala, Sweden) was an Estonian politician. He was a member of Estonian Constituent Assembly.
