= Ammermann =

Ammermann is a German surname. Notable people with the surname include:

- Jaan Ammermann (1889–?), Estonian politician
- Max Ammermann (1878–?), German rower
- Otto Ammermann (born 1932), German equestrian

== See also ==
- Ammerman
