= Aleksander Schipai =

Estonian politician (1890–1942)

Aleksander Schipai (also Aleksander Šipai. 8 August 1890 in Saint Petersburg – 1 May 1942 in Turinsk, Sverdlovsk Oblast, USSR) was an Estonian politician. He was a member of the Estonian Constituent Assembly, representing the Estonian People's Party. He was a member of the assembly from 22 May 1919. He replaced Oskar Kallas.
