= August Reeben =

Estonian politician (1888–1973)

August Reeben (11 November 1888 Vana-Kuuste Parish, Tartu County – 19 January 1973 Tartu) was an Estonian politician. He was a member of Estonian Constituent Assembly. He was a member of the assembly since 14 November 1919. He replaced Nikolai Raps. On 16 December 1919, he resigned his position and he was replaced by Rudolf Koil.
