= Hans Mets =

Estonian politician

Hans Mets (30 August 1882 Kõo Parish, Viljandi County – ?) was an Estonian politician. He was a member of Estonian Constituent Assembly.
