= Johannes Reintalu =

Estonian politician (1875–1945)

Johannes Reintalu (also Johannes Reinthal; 31 March 1875 Kurista Parish, Viljandi County - 1 April 1945 Tallinn) was an Estonian politician. He was a member of Estonian Constituent Assembly. He was a member of the assembly since 23 April 1919. He replaced Eduard Hubel.
