= Eduard Birkenberg =

Estonian politician (1872–1943)

Eduard Birkenberg (2 February 1872 Saku Parish, Harrien County – 20 November 1943 Tallinn) was an Estonian politician. He was a member of Estonian Constituent Assembly, representing the Estonian People's Party and of the I and II Riigikogu, representing the Farmers' Assemblies. He was a member of the Constituent Assembly since 12 December 1919. He replaced Peeter Põld. Birkenberg himself resigned on 21 October 1920 and he was replaced by Gustav Seen.
