= Eduard Rosenvald =

Estonian politician

Eduard Rosenvald (8 October 1877 Keila Parish, Harju County - ?) was an Estonian politician. He was a member of Estonian Constituent Assembly.
