= Eduard Nipmann =

Estonian politician (1889–1960)

Eduard Nipmann (21 April 1889 Tallinn – 22 June 1960 Tallinn) was an Estonian politician. He was a member of Estonian Constituent Assembly.
