= Jakob Puss =

Estonian politician

Jakob Puss (born 14 October 1894 Kihelkonna, Saare County) was an Estonian politician. He was a member of Estonian Constituent Assembly. He was a member of the assembly since 25 October 1919. He replaced Tõnu Talbak.
