= Jakob Lindros =

Estonian politician

Jakob Lindros (born 1885) was an Estonian politician. He was a member of Estonian Constituent Assembly.
