= Rudolf Koil =

Estonian politician

Rudolf Koil (1878 – 1955) was an Estonian politician. He was a member of Estonian Constituent Assembly. He was a member of the assembly since 17 December 1919. He replaced August Reeben.
