= Vaabina =

Village in Estonia

- village
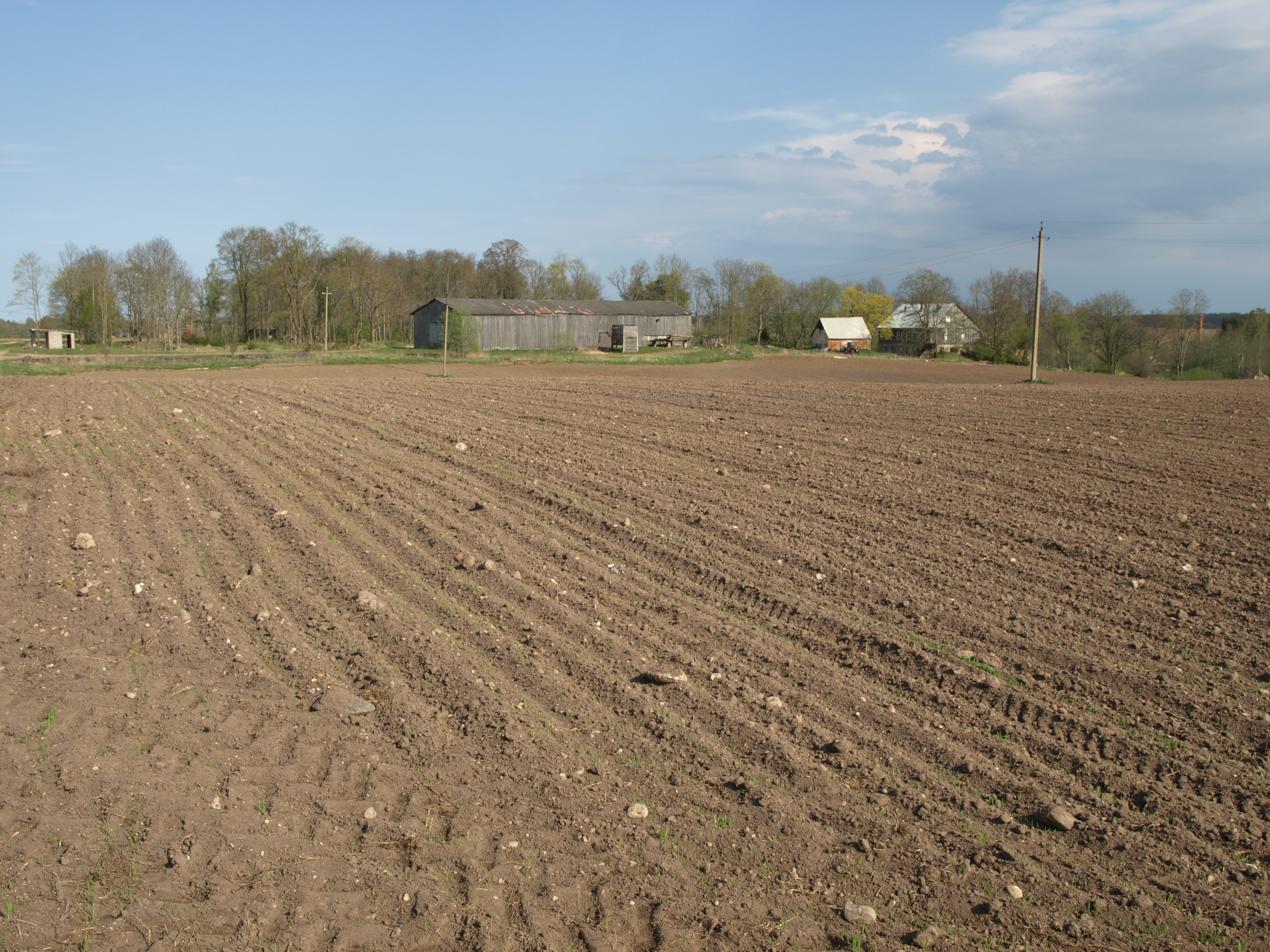
- Farm and site of ancient settlement

- Location in Estonia
- Coordinates: 57°51′50″N 26°36′31″E
- Country: Estonia
- County: Võru County
- Municipality: Antsla Parish

Population (26.05.2004)
  - Total: 232

Vaabina is a village in Antsla Parish, Võru County, in southeastern Estonia, located about 6 km northeast of the town of Antsla. It has a population of 232 (as of 26 May 2004).

Vaabina has a station on currently inactive Valga–Pechory railway. It is the birthplace of Emma Asson (1889–1965), who was the first women to be elected to the Estonian parliament.

== Vaabina Manor ==
Vaabina was first mentioned in 1405 as Ülzen or Uelzen. Its present name, Vaabina, is derived from the first name of Fabian von Tiesenhausen, the owner of Ülzen Manor in the 16th century. Today no remnants are left of the previous knight's manor.
