= Jaan Uri =

Estonian politician (1875–1942)

Jaan Uri (19 September 1875 Kambja Parish, Tartu County - 14 January 1942 Lesnoy, Kirov Oblast, Russia) was an Estonian politician. He was a member of Estonian Constituent Assembly. On 21 May 1919, he resigned his position and he was replaced by Hans Priimägi.
