= August Voldemar Sternfeldt =

Estonian politician

August Voldemar Sternfeldt (10 December 1884, in Mäksa Parish, Tartu County – ?) was an Estonian politician. He was a member of Estonian Constituent Assembly. He was a member of the assembly since 29 May 1919. He replaced Johan Pitka.
