= August Arras =

Estonian politician (1881–1968)

August Arras (27 June 1881 Erastvere Parish (now Kanepi Parish), Kreis Werro – 24 March 1968 Stockholm) was an Estonian politician. He was a member of Estonian Constituent Assembly, representing the Estonian Labour Party. On 16 October 1919, he resigned his post and he was replaced by Theodor Käärik.

He studied at Erastvere rural school and Kanepi parish school. In 1903 he graduated from Tartu Science School and in 1905 from Tartu Veterinary Institute, where he later worked as an assistant in a wound clinic. On his initiative, the EÜS Association was established in 1906, one of the predecessors of which was the veterinary students' association Aquilonia, which was being established.
