= Voldemar Hammer =

Estonian politician (1894–1982)

Voldemar Hammer (also Vladimir Hammer; since 1922 Kallas-Gammer; 8 June 1894, Ravila – 23 May 1982 Leningrad) was an Estonian politician. He was a member of Estonian Constituent Assembly. On 30 June 1919, he resigned his position and he was replaced by Jakob Mikiver.
