= Tõnu Loik =

Estonian politician

Tõnu Loik (19 November 1875 Einmanni Parish, Järva County – ?) was an Estonian politician. He was a member of Estonian Constituent Assembly.
