= Karl-Bernhard Kirp =

Estonian politician (1895–1930)

Karl-Bernhard Kirp (24 August 1895 in Valga – 4 May 1930 in Tartu) was an Estonian politician. He was a member of Estonian Constituent Assembly, representing the Estonian People's Party. He was a member of the assembly since 9 March 1920. He replaced Jaan Poska. On 11 March 1920, he resigned his position and he was replaced by Jakob Ploompuu.
