= Peeter Karin =

Estonian politician (1877–1944)

Peeter Karin (also Peeter Karrin; 9 October 1877 Tartu Parish, Tartu County – 23 August 1944 Ropka Parish, Tartu County) was an Estonian politician. He was a member of Estonian Constituent Assembly. On 15 April 1920, he resigned his position and he was replaced by Johannes Rätsep.
