= Jaan Pakk (politician) =

Estonian politician (1877–1948)

Jaan Pakk (1877 - 9 April 1948 Peningi Parish, Harju County) was an Estonian politician. He was a member of the Estonian Constituent Assembly, representing the Estonian Social Democratic Workers' Party. He was a member of the assembly since 15 November 1919. He replaced Gustav Grünvald.
