= Mats Nõges =

Estonian politician (1879–1973)

Mats Nõges (26 August 1879 in Kärksi, Viljandi Parish – 21 August 1973 in Viljandi) was an Estonian physician, editor and politician.

From 1915–1922 editor-in-chief of the newspaper Sakala. From 1917 until 1918, he was the Mayor of Viljandi. He was a member of Estonian Constituent Assembly.
