= Juhan Ostrat =

Estonian politician (1883–1957)

Juhan Ostrat (also Johannes Ostrat; 5 March 1883 Kudina Parish, Tartu County - 22 February 1957) was an Estonian politician. He was a member of Estonian Constituent Assembly. He was a member of the assembly since 19 December 1919. He replaced Juhan Ainson. On 22 January 1920, he resigned his position and he was replaced by Jaan Sitska.
