= Hans Orav =

Estonian politician

Hans Orav (27 July 1882 Pärnu County - ?) was an Estonian politician. He was a member of Estonian Constituent Assembly. He was a member of the assembly since 7 October 1919. He replaced Aleksander Velvelt.
