= Mait Püümets =

Estonian politician (1882–1965)

Mait Püümets (born Mait Johannes Püümann; 11 July 1882 in Peningi Parish, Harju County – 23 January 1965 in Tallinn) was an Estonian politician. He was a member of Estonian Constituent Assembly.
