= Gustav Arnold Grünvald =

Estonian politician (1888–1957)

Gustav Arnold Grünvald (also Gustav/Gustaf Grünvaldt; 25 August 1888 Tartu – 1957 New Zealand) was an Estonian politician. He was a member of the Estonian Constituent Assembly, representing the Estonian Social Democratic Workers' Party. On 14 November 1919, he resigned his position and he was replaced by Jaan Pakk.
