= Ammerman =

Ammerman is a surname. Notable people with the surname include:

- Brooke Ammerman (born 1990), American ice hockey player
- Celia Ammerman (born 1983), American fashion model
- Joseph S. Ammerman (1924–1993), American politician
- Nancy Ammerman (born 1950), American sociologist
- Robert W. Ammerman (1841–1907), American soldier and Medal of Honor recipient
- Ryan Ammerman (born 1985), American volleyball player

== See also ==
- Ammermann
