= Hans Nurk =

Estonian politician (1889–1944)

Hans Nurk (15 June 1889 Tarvastu Parish, Viljandi County – 17 November 1944 Tallinn) was an Estonian politician. He was a member of Estonian Constituent Assembly.
