= Hans Priimägi =

Estonian politician

Hans Priimägi (28 February 1880 Keeni Parish, Tartu County – ?) was an Estonian politician. He was a member of Estonian Constituent Assembly. He was a member of the assembly since 22 May 1919. He replaced Jaan Uri. On 26 August 1919, he resigned his position and he was replaced by Jaan Järve.
