= Artur Kaplur =

Estonian politician (1894–1953)

Artur Kaplur (1894 – 13 February 1953 Paide) was an Estonian politician. He was a member of Estonian Constituent Assembly, representing the Estonian Social Democratic Workers' Party.
