= Jaan Lõo =

Estonian politician (1872–1939)

Jaan Lõo (6 February 1872 Holstre Parish, Viljandi County – 18 February 1939 Tallinn) was an Estonian Supreme Court judge, poet and politician. He was a member of Estonian Constituent Assembly. On 16 December 1919, he resigned his position and he was replaced by Harald Normak. His collection of poems Nägemised, published in 196, contains mainly patriotic poetry and verses of ancient traditions.
