= Christian Brüller =

Estonian politician (1877–1950)

Christian Brüller (since 1938 Kristjan Prüller; 23 June 1877 Sulustvere, Kurista Parish, Kreis Fellin (Viljandi) – 14 May 1950 Põltsamaa) was an Estonian politician. He was a member of Estonian Constituent Assembly. He was a member of the assembly since 28 September 1920. He replaced Heinrich Tats.
