= Nikolai Raps =

Estonian politician

Nikolai Raps (1878–1953) was an Estonian politician. He was a member of the Estonian Constituent Assembly. He was a member of the assembly since 24 October 1919. He replaced Jüri Uustalu. On 13 November 1919, he resigned his position and he was replaced by August Reeben.
