= Tõnu Talbak =

Estonian politician

Tõnu Talbak (20 June 1888 Kolga Parish, Harju County - ?) was an Estonian politician. He was a member of Estonian Constituent Assembly. He was a member of the assembly since 23 April 1919. He replaced Jaan Letner. On 25 October 1919, he resigned his position and he was replaced by Jakob Puss.
