= Gustav Seen =

Estonian politician (1871–1943)

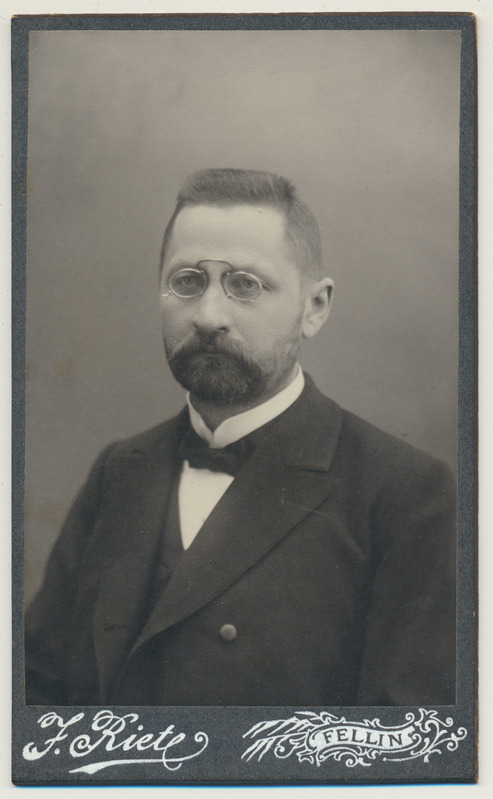
Gustav Seen ca 1910

Gustav Seen (30 March 1871 Urvast Parish, Võru County - 11 April 1943 Viljandi) was an Estonian politician. He was a member of Estonian Constituent Assembly. He was a member of the assembly since 22 October 1920. He replaced Eduard Birkenberg.
