= Georg Puusepp =

Estonian politician

Georg Puusepp (3 February 1869 – 26 October 1937 Narva) was an Estonian politician. He was a member of Estonian Constituent Assembly. On 23 April 1919, he resigned his position and he was replaced by Peeter Londo.
