= Gustav Küjen =

Estonian politician (1871–1920)

Gustav Küjen (13 January 1871 Peetri Parish, Järva County – 17 August 1920 Tallinn) was an Estonian politician. He was a member of Estonian Constituent Assembly. He was a member of the assembly since 24 April 1920. He replaced Robert Astrem. About 18 August 1920, he resigned his position and he was replaced by Johannes Põllupüü.
