= Hugo Bernhard Kikson =

Estonian politician

Hugo Bernhard Kikson (18 July 1898 Halina Parish, Pärnu County – 21 April 1942) was an Estonian politician. He was a member of Estonian Constituent Assembly.
