= Karl Heinrich Tomingas =

Estonian politician (1892–1969)

Karl Heinrich Tomingas (or Toomingas; 22 May 1892 – 13 February 1969) was an Estonian politician. He was a member of Estonian Constituent Assembly. On 7 September 1920, he resigned his position and he was replaced by Verner Nerep.

He was born in Sindi Municipality, Pärnu County.
