= Aleksander Velvelt =

Estonian politician (1897–1967)

Aleksander Velvelt (3 February 1897 in Pihtla Parish, Kreis Ösel – 14 February 1967 in Kohtla-Järve) was an Estonian politician. He was a member of Estonian Constituent Assembly. On 6 October 1919, he resigned his position and he was replaced by Hans Orav.
