= Vironians =

Tribe of Baltic Finns

The Vironians (Estonian: virulased) were one of the early medieval Finnic tribes that later formed into the Estonian people.

== History ==
They Vironians lived in the northeastern part of modern-day Estonia, in the pre-Christian maakond (county) of Vironia (Virumaa or Viru in Estonian, Wierland in German, Virland in Scandinavian languages) located in what are now the Ida-Viru County and Lääne-Viru County. Vironians are thought to have consisted of five "clans" (kilikunda), Maum (in Estonian "Mahu"), Laemund (Lemmu) also known as Pudiviru, Askele, Revele (Rebala), Alentagh (Alutaguse). They built many strongholds, like Tarwanpe (modern Rakvere) and Agelinde (now Punamägi Hill in Äntu village).

Like other Estonian tribes, Vironians remained predominantly pagan before Northern Crusades in the 13th century. According to the Chronicle of Henry of Livonia, Vironians believed that Tharapita, a god worshipped by Osilians (the tribe inhabiting Saaremaa) was born in Vironia. However, Vironian elder Thabelin of Pudiviru had endorsed Christianity before the German and Danish crusaders reached Estonia. Thabelin (Tabellinus) was baptized by Germans in Gotland island. Later, when competing Danish crusaders arrived in Vironia, Thabelin was suspected of being too pro-German and was hanged.

In 1219, the German crusaders of the Livonian Brothers of the Sword made a raid against Vironians together with recently christened Letts, Livonians, and several proto-Estonian tribes (Sakalians, Ugaunians and Jervians). After five days of killing and pillaging, Kyriavan, Thabelin and other Vironian elders asked for a truce. According to the chronicle, Kyriavan told he had a "very bad god" before and therefore was ready to accept the Christian god. After truce was made, Vironian elders accepted Christianity. Some sons of elders from all five Vironian clans were taken hostages by the crusaders as part of the truce.

In 1221, Vironians took part in failed attempt to oust Danes who had built a fortress in the place of modern Tallinn in the neighboring province of Revelia. Danes retaliated, killed several Vironian elders and put Vironians under heavy taxes. In 1225, Danes and German crusaders clashed with each other over the ownership of Vironia. In 1226, The papal legate William of Modena arrived at the Vironian stronghold of Tarwanpe and mediated peace between the Germans, Danes, and Estonians.

A year later the Vironian territories were taken by Brothers of the Sword. Vironians sided with the new Papal Legate Baldwin of Alna who in 1230 tried to create a Papal Vassal State in Northern Estonia, including Vironia. In 1233, the supporters of Baldwin were defeated by the Order in the city of Reval (Tallinn). Vironian territories were snatched by the Order again as Baldwin of Alna complained in his report to the Pope in 1234. The Order was also accused of oppressing Vironian converts and expelling local supporters of Church.

In 1238, Vironia was given to Denmark again according to the treaty of Stensby. The area went into hands of powerful vassals of Danish king, many of whom were of local "Vironian" origin, e.g Dietrich of Kievel who controlled a large estate in eastern Vironia, where he started to build the stronghold of Narva.

== Etymology ==
The name Viru probably has Finnic roots (e.g., Finnish language vireä means "vivacious", "lively"). According to an alternative hypothesis the word Viru may have originated from Baltic languages with the meaning 'man' (cf. English word virile). Earliest mention of the name is probably on the Ängby Runestone located in Uppland, Sweden which has inscription in memory of a Viking named Björn who was killed in Virland (uirlant). In the Finnish language, Estonia is still called Viro after Vironians.

In Estonian, the word virulased is typically used for inhabitants of the modern-day Lääne-Viru County and Ida-Viru County.

== Trivia ==
"Graüben, a girl from Virland" (French: "Graüben, jeune Virlandaise") is a character in Jules Verne's 'Journey to the Centre of the Earth'.

== See also ==
- Virumaa
- Danish Estonia
- Northern Crusades
