= Peeter Ruubel =

Estonian politician (1885–1957)

Peeter Ruubel (13 October 1885 Kaarli Parish, Viljandi County - 24 December 1957) was an Estonian politician. He was a member of Estonian Constituent Assembly. He was a member of the assembly since 7 October 1919. He replaced Karl Saar.
