= Verner Nerep =

Estonian politician (1895–1959)

Verner Nerep (25 October 1895 Sargvere Parish, Järva County – 25 August 1959 Stockholm) was an Estonian politician. He was a member of the Estonian Constituent Assembly from 7 September 1920 until its dissolution in December of that year, filling a position after Johan Epner's resignation.
