= August Ehrlich =

Estonian agronomist and politician

August Ehrlich (from 1940, August Eerme; 23 September 1893 – 1 September 1942) was an Estonian agronomist and politician. He was a member of the I and II Riigikogu.

August Ehrlich was born in Vana-Prangli, Krüüdneri Parish (now, part of Kanepi Parish, Põlva County) into a family of farmers. He attended Vana-Prangli Parish School, Vana-Kuuste Ministry School and Kambja Parish Primary School before being enrolled at the Hugo Treffner Gymnasium in 1906 and graduating in 1913. From 1913 to 1918 he studied agronomy at the University of Tartu. During World War I and the Estonian War of Independence, he worked as a military supplier. Ehrlich was a member of the Estonian Constituent Assembly and the I and II Riigikogu, representing the Estonian People's Party. From 1918 to 1924 he managed seed growing in the father's farm in Krüüdneri Parish.

In 1918, he married Magda Ruus. The couple had two daughters and a son.

Following the Soviet occupation of the Estonia in 1940, he was arrested and executed in 1942 in the Ussolye prison camp in Solikamsky District, Russian Soviet Federative Socialist Republic.
