= Theodor Käärik =

Estonian politician (1889–1940)

Theodor Andreas Käärik (10 November 1889 Viljandi – 3 February 1940 Tallinn) was an Estonian politician. He was a member of Estonian Constituent Assembly, representing the Estonian Labour Party. He was a member of the assembly, since 17 October 1919. He replaced August Arras.
