= Jakob Mikiver =

Estonian politician (1881–1964)

Jakob Mikiver (5 August 1881 Kolga Parish (now Kuusalu Parish), Kreis Harrien – 1 June 1964 Loksa Selsoviet, Harju District) was an Estonian politician and watchmaker. He was a member of Estonian Constituent Assembly, representing the Estonian Social Democratic Workers' Party. He was a member of the assembly since 1 July 1919. He replaced Voldemar Hammer.
