= Kärla-Kulli =

Village in Estonia

- Village
- Location within Estonia
- Coordinates: 58°19′9″N 22°0′28″E
- Country: Estonia
- County: Saare County
- Parish: Saaremaa Parish
- Time zone: UTC+2 (EET)
  - Summer (DST): UTC+3 (EEST)

Kärla-Kulli is a village in Saaremaa Parish, Saare County in western Estonia on the island of Saaremaa.

Before the administrative reform in 2017, the village was in Lääne-Saare Parish (prior to 2014 part of Kärla Parish).
