= Anton Ratasepp =

Estonian politician

Anton Ratasepp (1881 – ?) was an Estonian politician. He was a member of Estonian Constituent Assembly. He was a member of the assembly since 9 August 1919. He replaced August Tibar.
