= Kaarel Lukk =

Estonian racewalker

Personal information
- Nationality: Estonian
- Born: 6 December 1887 Tähtvere Parish (now part of Tartu), Kreis Dorpat, Governorate of Livonia, Russian Empire
- Died: 17 November 1970 (aged 82) Tartu, Estonia

Sport
- Sport: Athletics
- Event: Racewalking

Kaarel Lukk (also Karl Michael Lukk; 6 December 1887 – 17 November 1970) was an Estonian racewalker and politician. He competed in the men's 10 kilometres walk at the 1912 Summer Olympics for the Russian Empire.

He was a member of Estonian Constituent Assembly.
