= Äntu Lakes =

Lakes in Estonia

- Äntu järved (Estonian)
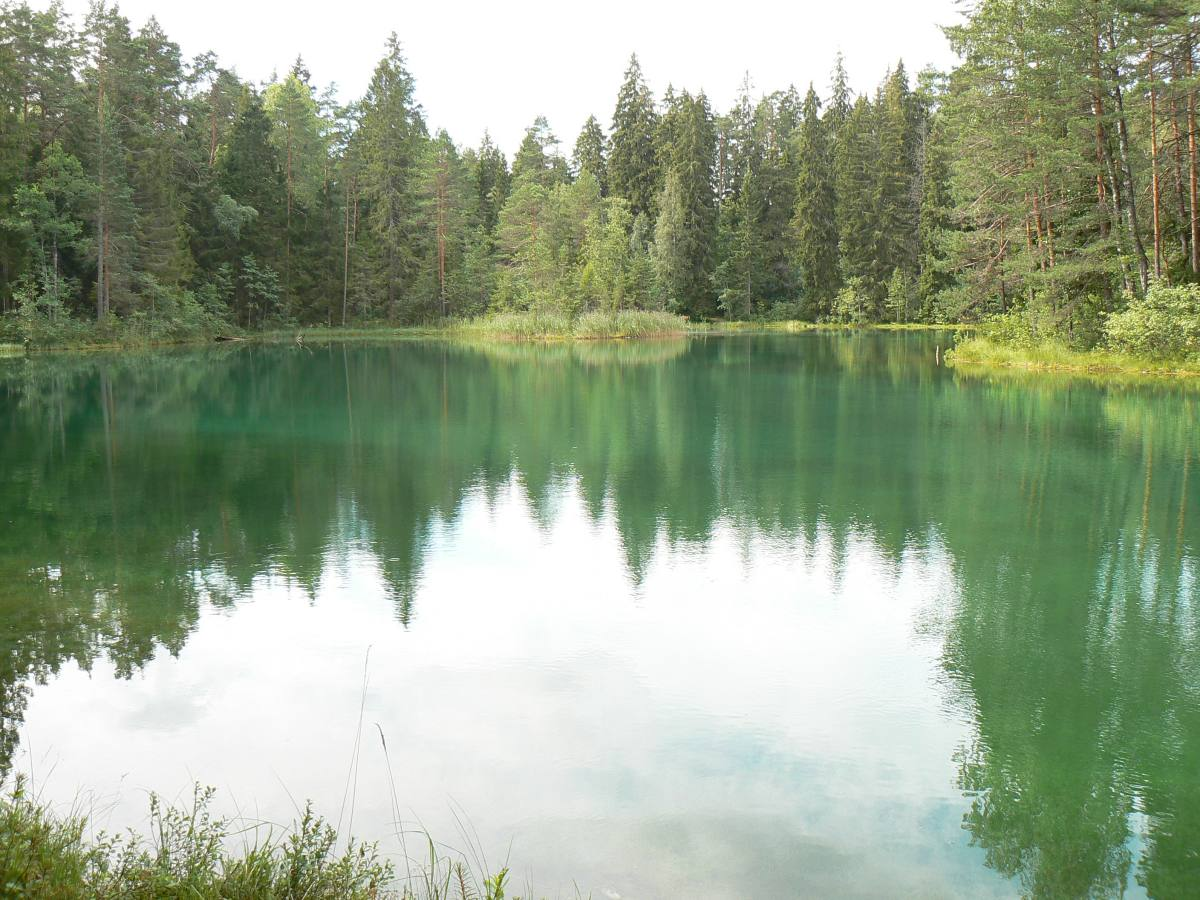
- Blue Lake (Sinijärv)

- Location within Estonia
- Interactive map of Äntu Lakes
- Location: Äntu, Lääne-Viru County
- Coordinates: 59.0605°N 26.2408°E
- Type: Lake
- Basin countries: Estonia
- Surface elevation: 94.6 metres (310 ft)

The Äntu Lakes (Estonian: Äntu järved) are group of seven natural lakes in Lääne-Viru County, Estonia, as well as three reservoirs (two unnamed).

The most notable of the lakes are Blue Lake (Estonian: Sinijärv) and Green Lake (Estonian: Roheline järv) because of their bluish-green colour and transparency. The lakes' bottom are covered with light-coloured lime.

== Lakes ==
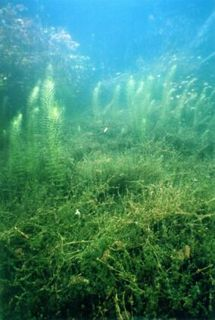
Bottom of Blue Lake

The Äntu Lakes are:

- Valgejärv (White Lake)
- Roheline järv (Green Lake) or Vahejärv (Middle Lake)
- Sinijärv (Blue Lake)
- Linaleojärv (Flax-Retting Lake) or Moora järv
- Mäeotsa järv or Mäetaguse järv
- Kaanjärv
- Umbjärv (Sink Lake)
- Järaniku järv or Äntu tehisjärv (Äntu Reservoir) or Äntu veehoidla (Äntu Reservoir)

Near and around the lakes there are many hiking trails.
