= Eve-Külli Kala =

Estonian diplomat

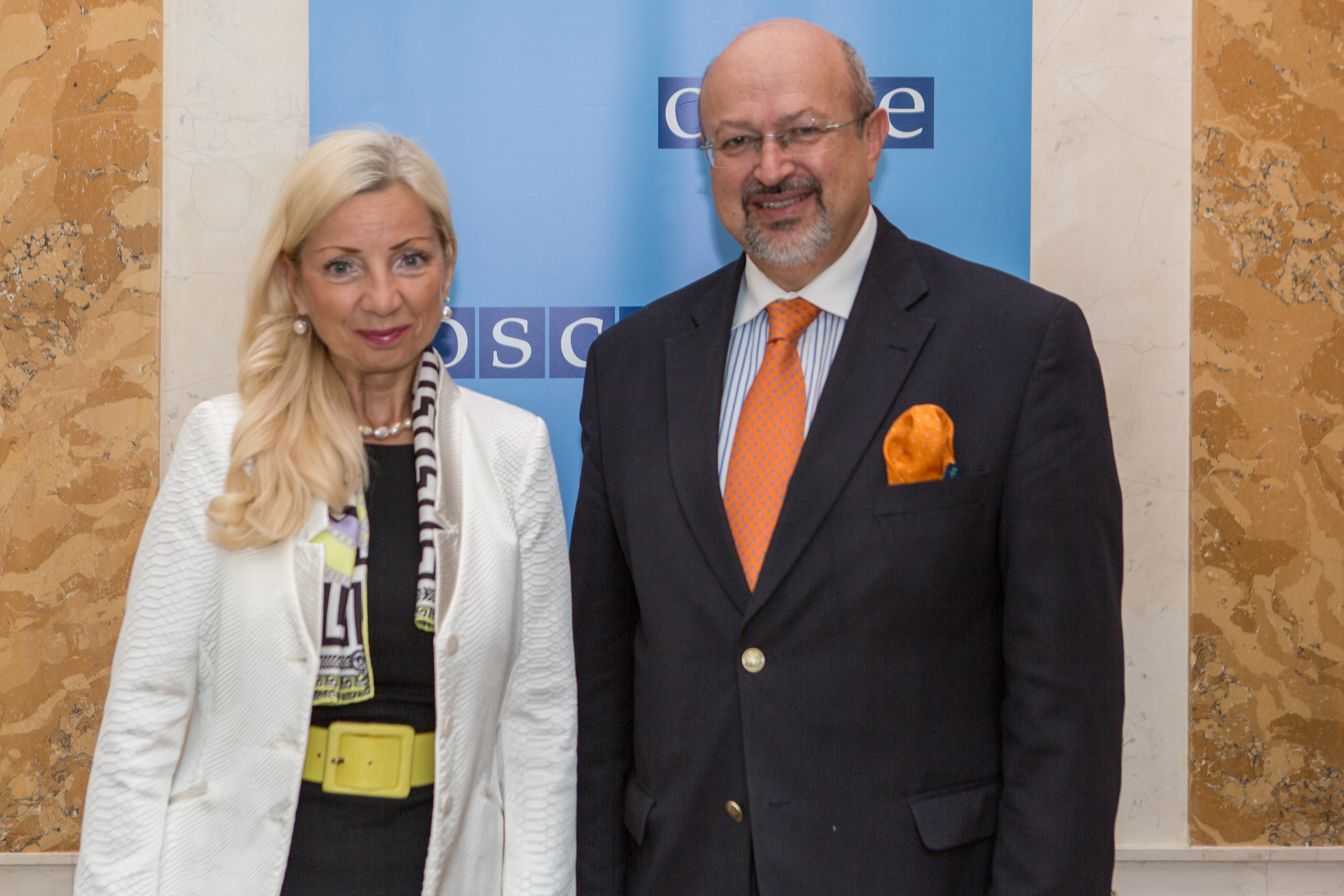
Eve-Külli Kala with the Secretary General of OSCE, Lamberto Zannier (2015)

Eve-Külli Kala (born 10 November 1959 in Tartu) is an Estonian diplomat.

She has graduated from Tallinn Pedagogical University in English and German philology, and also graduated from Estonian School of Diplomacy. Since 1992 she has worked for Estonian Foreign Ministry.

2002-2006 she was Ambassador of Estonia to Czech Republic. Since 2010 she was Ambassador of Estonia to Slovakia.

Awards:

- 2007: Order of the White Star, IV class.
