= Külli Reinumägi =

Estonian actress

Külli Reinumägi (née Koik; born 25 February 1974) is an Estonian actress.

Külli Reinumägi was born in Tallinn. She graduated from the Estonian Academy of Music and Theatre in 1996. After graduation, she began her stage career at the Estonian Drama Theatre. Later, she has continued her acting career as a freelancer and is one of the leaders and creators of the creative association MTÜ Oma Lava with Liia Kanemägi. In addition to theatrical role, Reinumägi has played in several television series, radio plays and films.

Reinumägi is married to film producer Alvar Reinumägi.

== Selected filmography ==
- 2007 Brigaad 3 (role: Ulvi Sein)
- 2007 Sügisball (role: Laura's colleague)
- 2010 Lumekuninganna (role: ?)
- 2010-2011 Unistuste Agentuur (role: Kristi)
- 2012-2013 Ment (role: Renate Paabel)
- 2012 Vikatimehe poeg (role: Grim reaper's spouse)
- 2014 Vaikivad orhideed (role: Kristi)
