= Johannes Ernesaks =

Estonian politician (1876–1952)

Johannes Ernesaks (22 July 1876 in Peningi Parish (now Raasiku Parish), Harrien County – 1952 in Kirov, Russian SFSR) was an Estonian politician. He was a member of the Estonian Constituent Assembly, representing the Estonian Social Democratic Workers' Party.
