= Eduard Kansma =

Estonian politician (1887–1946)

Eduard Kansma (1887–1946), also known as Eduard Kansman and Eduard Kansmann, was an Estonian politician.

Kansma was born on 10 October 1887 in Paldiski. He was elected to the Estonian Provincial Assembly, which governed the Autonomous Governorate of Estonia between 1917 and 1919; he served for the whole term. He then took up a seat in the newly formed Republic of Estonia's Asutav Kogu (Constituent Assembly), replacing Johannes-Friedrich Zimmermann on 5 November 1919, before stepping down on 16 March 1920. He sat in the Asutav Rogu as a member of the Estonian Labour Party. Kansma died on 2 January 1946 in Haapsalu.
