= Minni Kurs-Olesk =

Estonian politician (1879–1940)

Minni Kurs-Olesk (13 March 1879 Tartu – 20 October 1940 Tartu) was an Estonian politician. She was a member of Estonian Constituent Assembly in 1919-1920.
