= Nikolai Talts =

Estonian politician (1890–1949)

Nikolai Talts (26 November 1890 Laiksaare Parish, Pärnu County – 26 January 1949 Tallinn) was an Estonian lawyer and politician. He was a member of Estonian Constituent Assembly.

1933–1938 he was Minister of Agriculture.
