= Ferdinand Peterson =

Estonian engineer and politician

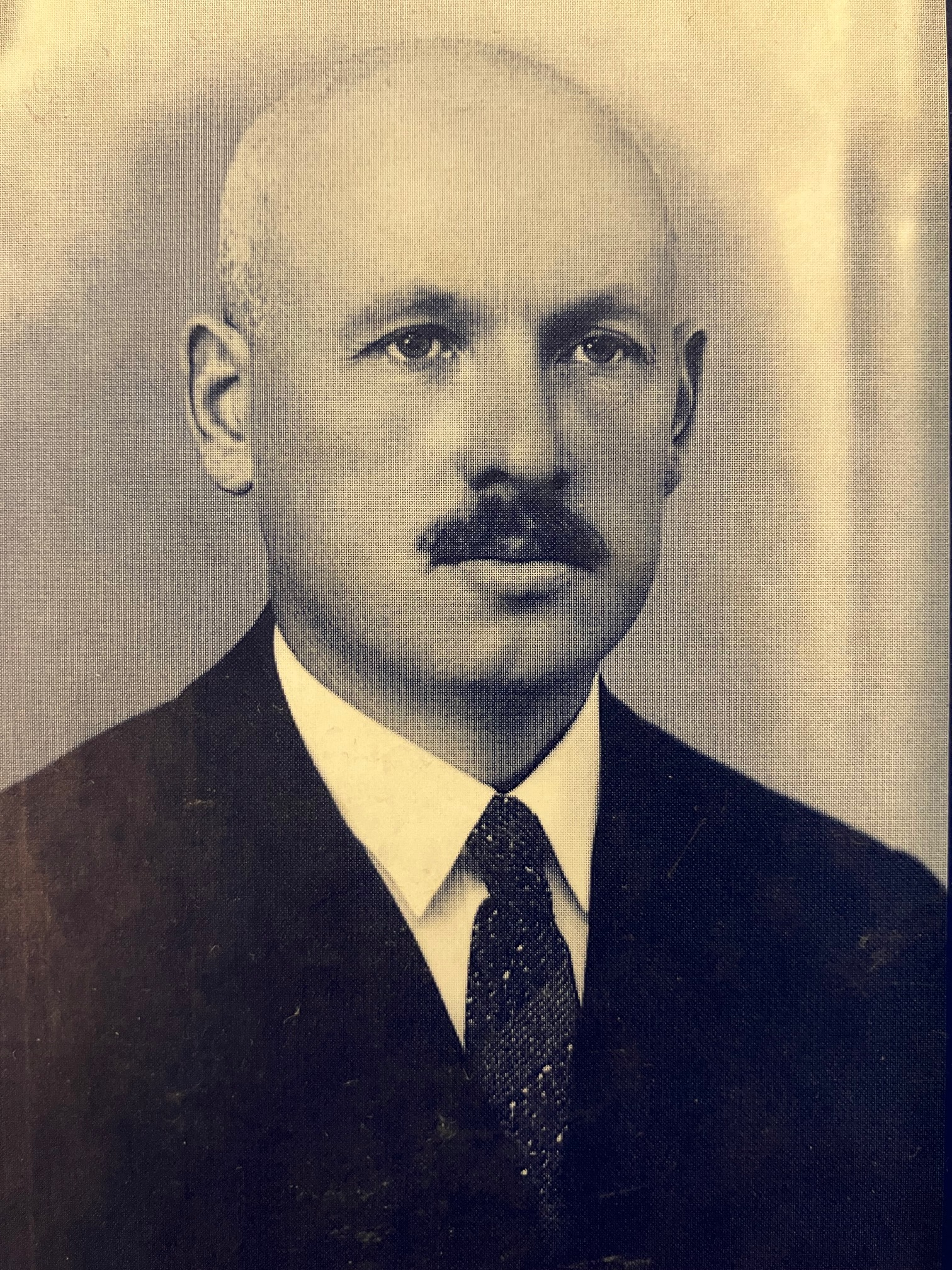
Ferdinand Peterson

Ferdinand August Peterson (also Ferdinand Petersen; 13 March 1887 Lehtse Parish (now Tapa Parish), Kreis Jerwen – 18 February 1979 Chapel Hill, North Carolina) was an Estonian engineer and politician.

From 1918 to 1919, he was the minister of roads in the Estonian Provisional Government. In 1919, he was a member of the Estonian Constituent Assembly.

In 1944, he fled the Soviet occupation of Estonia to Germany, and in 1949 he emigrated to the United States.

He was an honorary alumnus of the Estonian Students' Society.

Peterson died at Hillhaven Nursing Home in Chapel Hill, North Carolina in 1979.
