= Estonian Women's Union =

Organization based in Estonia

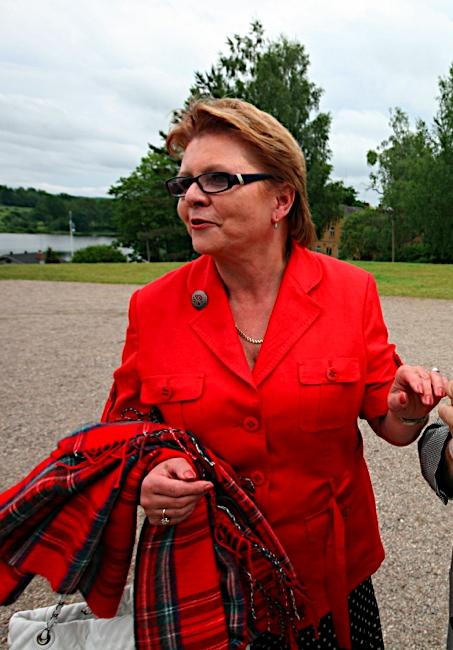
Siiri Oviir was ENL leader from 1996 to 2019

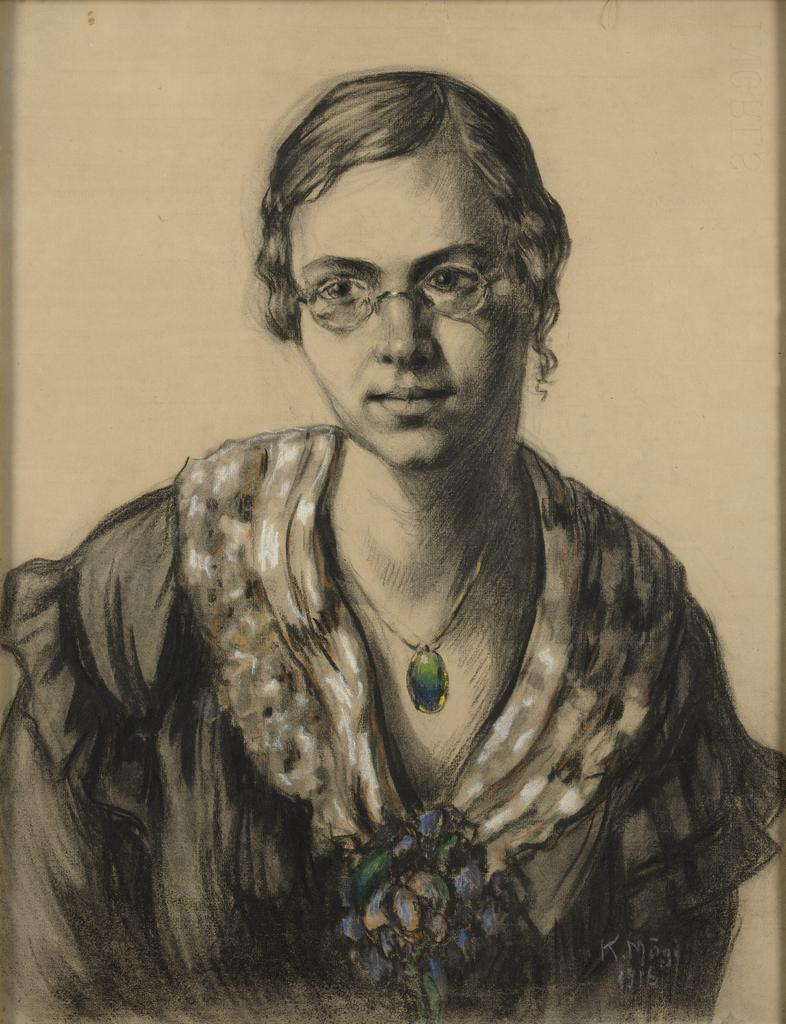
Marie Reisik was first ENL leader

Estonian Women's Union (Estonian: Eesti Naisliit, abbreviated ENL) is an Estonian organization which is the umbrella organization of Estonian women organizations, and which deals with topics related to women in Estonia.

ENL is established in 1920 as Union of Estonian Women's Organizations (Estonian: Eesti Naisorganisatsioonide Liit). First leader of ENL was Marie Reisik. In 1940, ENL was closed. ENL is re-established on 13 May 1989 in Tartu.

1996–2019, the leader of ENL was Siiri Oviir. Since 2019, the leader of ENL is Mailis Alt.

Every year, ENL chooses Mother of Year (Estonian: aasta ema) and Father of Year (Estonian: aasta isa).

== See also ==
- Tartu Eesti Naesterahva Selts
