= Andres Loorits =

Estonian politician (1869–1941)

Andres Loorits (30 November 1869 Holstre, Paistu Parish (now Viljandi Parish), Kreis Fellin – 4 September 1941 Tallinn) was an Estonian politician. He studied in Paistu Parish school (1878–1881). He was a member of the Estonian Constituent Assembly, representing the Estonian Socialist Revolutionary Party. On 9 October 1919, he resigned his position and he was replaced by Aleksander Janson.
