= Jaan Ammermann =

Estonian politician

Jaan Ammermann (1889 Uuemõisa (now Saaremaa Parish), Kreis Ösel – Kronstadt?) was an Estonian politician. He was a member of the Estonian Constituent Assembly, representing the Estonian Social Democratic Workers' Party.
