= Hans Martna =

Estonian politician (1890–1941)

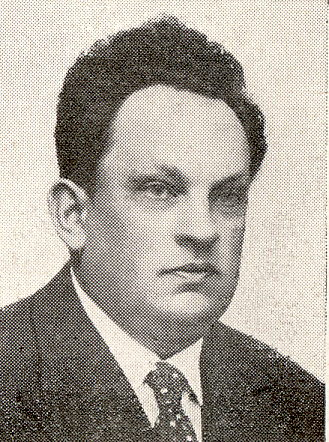
Hans Martna

Hans Martna (16 March 1890 Tartu – 3 November 1941 Solikamsk, Russia) was an Estonian politician. He was a member of Estonian Constituent Assembly. He was also the Secretary of the assembly.
