= Lümanda-Kulli =

Village in Estonia

Coordinates: 58°19′22″N 22°00′25″E

- Village
- Interactive map of Lümanda-Kulli
- Country: Estonia
- County: Saare County
- Parish: Saaremaa Parish
- Time zone: UTC+2 (EET)
  - Summer (DST): UTC+3 (EEST)

Lümanda-Kulli is a village in Saaremaa Parish, Saare County, in western Estonia.

Until 2014 the village was part of Lümanda Parish and bore the name of Kulli. From 2014 to 2017 the village renamed as Lümanda-Kulli, was part of a newly established municipality Lääne-Saare Parish. Since 2017, when all the municipalities on Saaremaa island were conjoined the village belongs to Saaremaa Parish.
