= Märt Raud (engineer) =

Estonian engineer

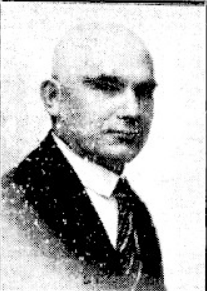
- Märt Raud
- Born: 23 July 1878; Õisu Parish, Kreis Fellin, Governorate of Livonia, Russian Empire
- Died: 4 July 1952; Krasnoyarsk Krai, Soviet Union
- Citizenship: Estonian
- Education: Riga Polytechnical Institute
- Known for: Developing of the oil shale industry in Estonia
- Scientific career
- Workplaces: Esimene Eesti Põlevkivitööstus (1918–1940)

Märt Raud (also Mart Raud; 23 July 1878 Õisu Parish, Kreis Fellin – 4 July 1952 Krasnoyarsk Krai, Russian SFSR) was an Estonian oil-shale industrialist, engineer and politician.

Märt Raud started his education at Õisu elementary school and continued it at Paistu parish school. Later he studied at Tartu Teachers' Seminar, after which he worked as the Head of Kolga-Jaani parish school in 1899–1906. He was one of the founders of Estonian high-school in St. Petersburg.

In 1906, Märt Raud began his studies at the Riga Polytechnical Institute, which he graduated in 1912 as a civil engineer. Between 1912 and 1913, he was a supervisor of the construction of the Theater House of the Estonian Education and Assistance Society in Riga. This building became later the building of the Riga Estonian Society. Märt Raud was also a founding member of the Estonian Students' Society of Riga.

Prior to the outbreak of World War I, Märt Raud was the head of the Land Improvement Bureau of the North Livonian Farmers' Society in Tartu. During the war until 1917 he worked in Petrograd as a military officer and was also in charge of courses for military road technicians and foremen. In March 1918, Raud who was influenced by a geologist Nikolay Pogrebov, began to examine literature on oil shale and to participate at discussions of Estonian oil shale research and perspectives. As a result, he became a convinced supporter of oil shale use with a vision how to build-up the oil shale industry in Estonia.

In August 1918, he was invited by German occupation authorities to return to Estonia for establishing the oil-shale industry. After the War of Independence, he served as head of the committee for returning assets which were transferred to Russia before the German occupation. On 26 September 1922 he became a member of I Riigikogu when he replaced Hans Martna, but he resigned his position and he was replaced by Robert Astrem on 29 September 1922.

From 1918 to 1940 he was the head of the State Oil Shale Industry (since 1936: First Estonian Oil Shale Industry). In addition, he was a member of the National Economic Council, the Estonian Child Protection Association, the Rotary Club, the Estonian-Finnish-Hungarian Association.

During the first year of the Soviet occupation, he was let to lead the nationalized oil shale industry, but in 1941 he was moved in a lower position of senior engineer. In 1944–1948 he was head of the Oil Shale Chemistry Department of the Estonian SSR State Plan Committee.

In 1949, Märt Raud was deported to the settlement of the Balahtshin gold mine in the Shirinski district of Krasnoyarsk. In 1952, he was arrested and sentenced to 10 years in prison and then for another 5 years. He died in the same year.
