= Eduard Kübarsepp =

Estonian politician

Eduard Kübarsepp (8 April 1877 Mäksa Parish, Tartu County – April 1962) was an Estonian politician. He was a member of Estonian Constituent Assembly. He was a member of the assembly since 24 January 1920. He replaced Harald Normak.
