= Aleksander Tulp =

Estonian politician (1883–1952)

Aleksander Tulp (5 March 1883 Tallinn - April 1952 Volhov District, Leningrad Oblast, Russia) was an Estonian politician. He was a member of Estonian Constituent Assembly.
