= Robert Astrem =

Estonian politician (1887–1941)

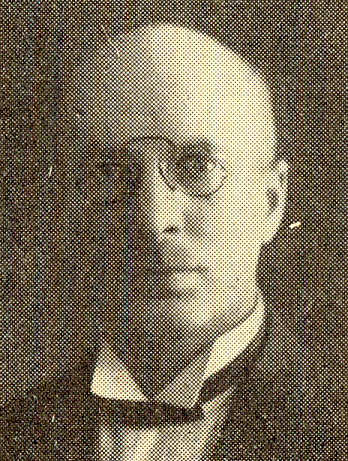
Robert Astrem

Robert Astrem (or Robert Aström; 24 January 1887 Narva – 8 February 1941 Tallinn) was an Estonian politician. He was a member of Estonian Constituent Assembly, representing the Estonian Social Democratic Workers' Party. On 23 April 1920, he resigned his post and he was replaced by Gustav Küjen.
