= Marie Reisik =

Estonian politician and activist

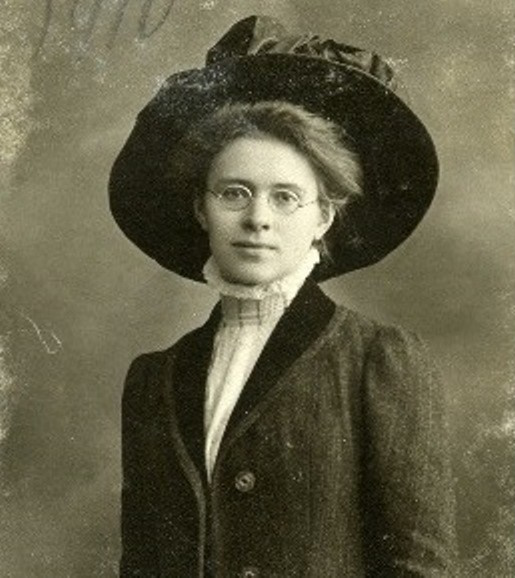
Marie Reisik c. 1910

Marie Reisik (born Marie Tamman; 6 February 1887 in Kilingi-Nõmme, died 3 August 1941 in Tallinn, Estonia), an Estonian teacher, women rights activist and politician.

== Biography ==
Marie Reisik was born 6 February 1887 in Kilingi-Nõmme to Tõnu and Liisa Tamman. She attended school in Pärnu, yet as women in Estonia could not enter the university at that time, Reisik studied in Paris and became a teacher of French. She was one of the founder of the first women's organisation in Estonia in 1907, the Tartu Eesti Naesterahva Selts, and she founded the first political journal for women, “Naisterahva Töö ja Elu” (“Women’s Work and Life”) which united educated women of Estonia. Her work contributed to organizing the first Estonian Women Congress (Estonian: Eestimaa Naiste Kongress) (1917) which helped to found Estonian Women's Union (1920). She initiated the emancipation movements across the country and became an active politician. In 1919, she was elected to the Estonian Constituent Assembly and she was the only female member of the parliament. In 1941, she was wanted by the NKVD. Marie Reisik died on 3 August 1941 in Tallinn Central Hospital and is buried in Liiva Cemetery.
