= Külli Tomingas =

Estonian opera singer

Külli Tomingas (born 29 June 1972 in Pärnu, Estonia), is an Estonian opera singer, mezzo-soprano, living in Milan, Italy.

== Biography ==
Külli started her studies at Music Department of Pärnu High School of Humanities (Tiina Palmer), then at the Tallinn Conservatory (Urve Tauts). In 1994 took place her debut as Marcellina in "Le Nozze di Figaro" at the Pärnu Opera (conductor Rolf Gupta, directed by Elmo Nüganen). There followed the "Pierrot Lunaire" by Arnold Schoenberg in Pärnu Opera (conductor Andrus Kallastu, directed by Rein Laos), role of Sharon in Masterclass by T.MacNelly at the Endla Theater (directed by U.Vilimaa). Role of the third slave in "Elektra" by Richard Strauss at the Pärnu Opera in (A.Kallastu, directed by R.Laos).

Külli graduated from Piacenza Conservatory in Italy, in class of Adelisa Tabiadon. Her studies continued at the Milan Academy of Music with Bianca Maria Casoni. Külli participated in master classes of Matti Pelo, Leyla Gencer, Luciana Serra, Claudio Desderi, Katia Ricciarelli and Enzo Dara. She has received recognition in several international singing competitions: Roero in Musica, Nino Carta of Moncaleri, Titta Ruffo of Pisa, Ismaele Voltolini of Mantua, Riccardo Zandonai of Riva del Garda and Voice Masters of Monte Carlo.

== Professional career ==
She has played the roles of Marcellina and Cherubino (Mozart's "Le Nozze di Figaro"), Dorabella (Mozart's "Così fan tutte"), Sesto (Mozart's "Clemenza di Tito"), Zerlina (Mozart's "Don Giovanni"), Rosina (Rossini's "Barbiere di Siviglia"), Cenerentola (Rossini's "Cenerentola"), Suor Dolcina, Prima Conversa, Maestra delle Novizie, Zelatrice and Badessa(Puccini's "Suor Angelica"), Suzuki (Puccini's "Madama Butterfly"), Noah's wife (Britten's "Noah's Ark"), Flora (Verdi's "Traviata"), Lola and Mamma Lucia (Mascagni's "Cavalleria rusticana"), First Witch (Purcell's "Dido and Aeneas"), Fortunata (Maderna's "Satyricon").

With conductors:Rolf Gupta, Andrus Kallastu, Matteo Beltrami, Andrea Raffanini, Gioele Muglialdo, Claudio Vadagnini, Luca Pfaff and Tiziano Severini. And directors:Elmo Nüganen, Rein Laos, Ulo Vilimaa, Massimo Scaglione, Mario Riccardo Migliara, Andrea De Rosa and Denis Krief.

In theaters, halls and festivals: Teater Endla of Pärnu, Draamateater of Tallinn, Vanemuine of Tartu, Spazio Teatro 89 of Milano, Teatro Alfieri of Torino, Teatro Garau of Oristano, Teatro of Varese, Teatro Civico of La Spezia, Auditorium Verdi of Milano, Teatro Smeraldo of Milano, Teatro Lirico of Magenta, Teatro Sociale of Rovigo, Palabassano, Teatro Verdi of Padova, Teatro Sociale of Vicenza, Teatro Sociale of Brescia, Teatro Sociale of Busto Arsizio, Teatro Coccia of Novara, Teatro Manzoni of Monza, Sala Verdi of Conservatory of Milano, Teatro Opéra Garnier of Montecarlo, Teatro Goldoni of Livorno, Teatro Verdi of Pisa, Teatro del Giglio of Lucca, Museum of Teatro alla Scala, Hall Bösendorfer of Vienna, Gli Amici del Loggione della Scala, David Oistrah festival of Pärnu, Sorrento Festival, Dino Ciani festival of Cortina D'Ampezzo.

She sings a wide repertory of chamber music with pianist Luca Schieppati.
