= Äntu =

Village in Estonia

- village
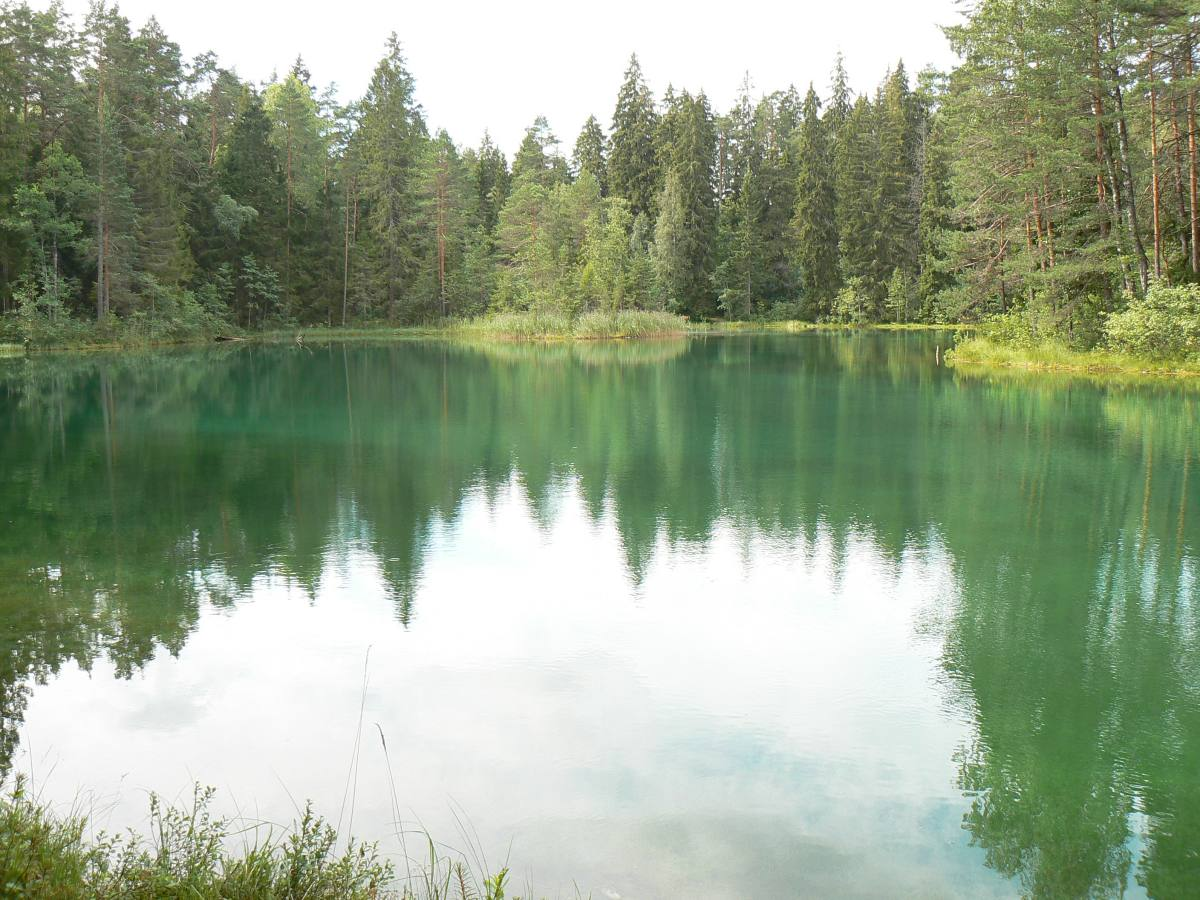
- Äntu Sinijärv (Äntu Blue Lake)

- Location in Estonia
- Coordinates: 59°05′22″N 26°16′05″E
- Country: Estonia
- County: Lääne-Viru County
- Municipality: Väike-Maarja Parish

Population (01.01.2011)
  - Total: 50

Äntu (German: Engdes) is a village in Väike-Maarja Parish, Lääne-Viru County, in northeastern Estonia. It has a population of 50 (as of 1 January 2011).

== Äntu Hill Fort ==
Äntu Hill Fort (or Punamägi Hill Fort, according to old sources Agelinde) is located in this village. The fort was established at the beginning of 11th century. The fort is mentioned in "Livonian Chronicle of Henry".

== Gallery ==
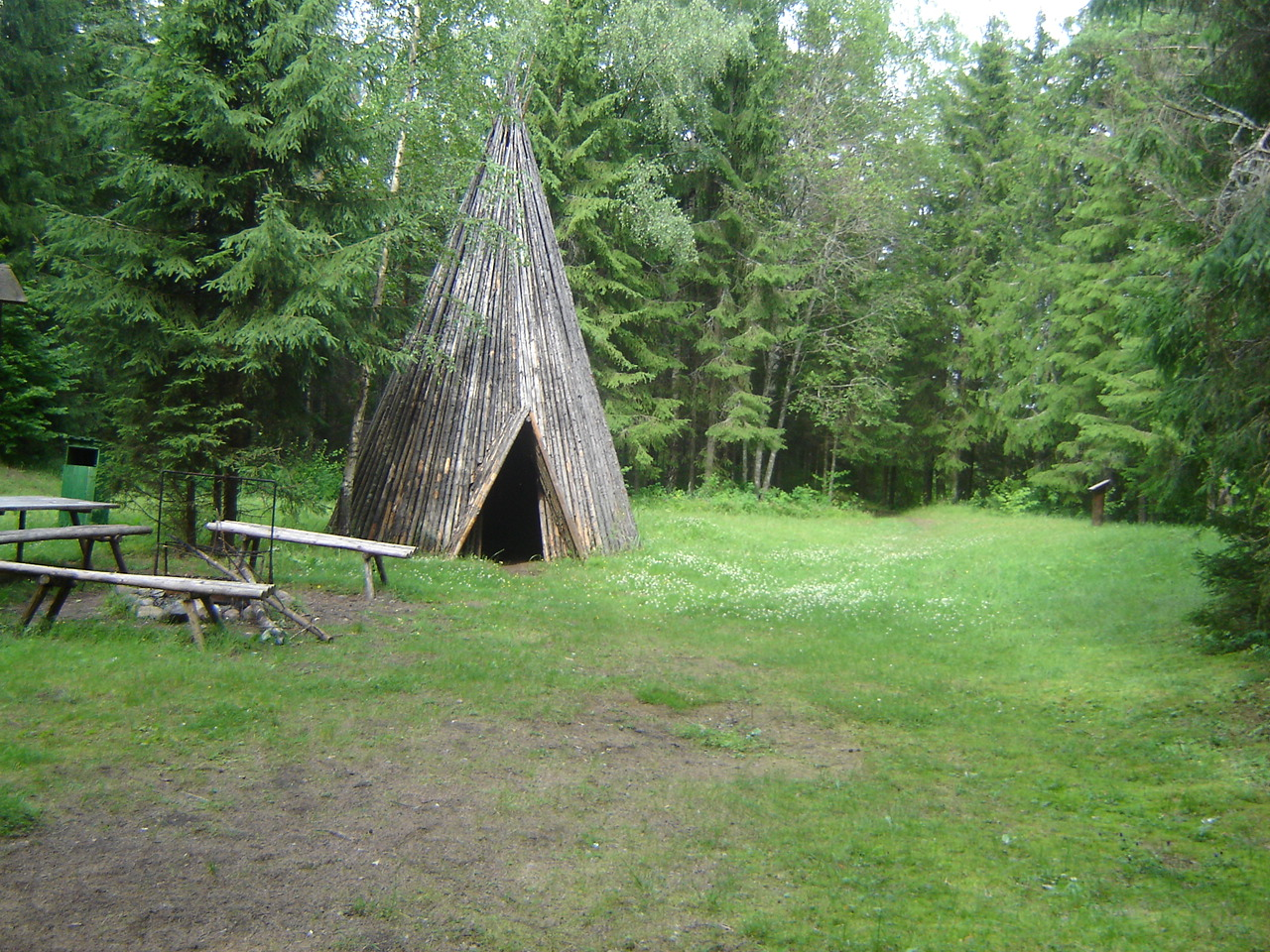
Site of former Äntu stronghold

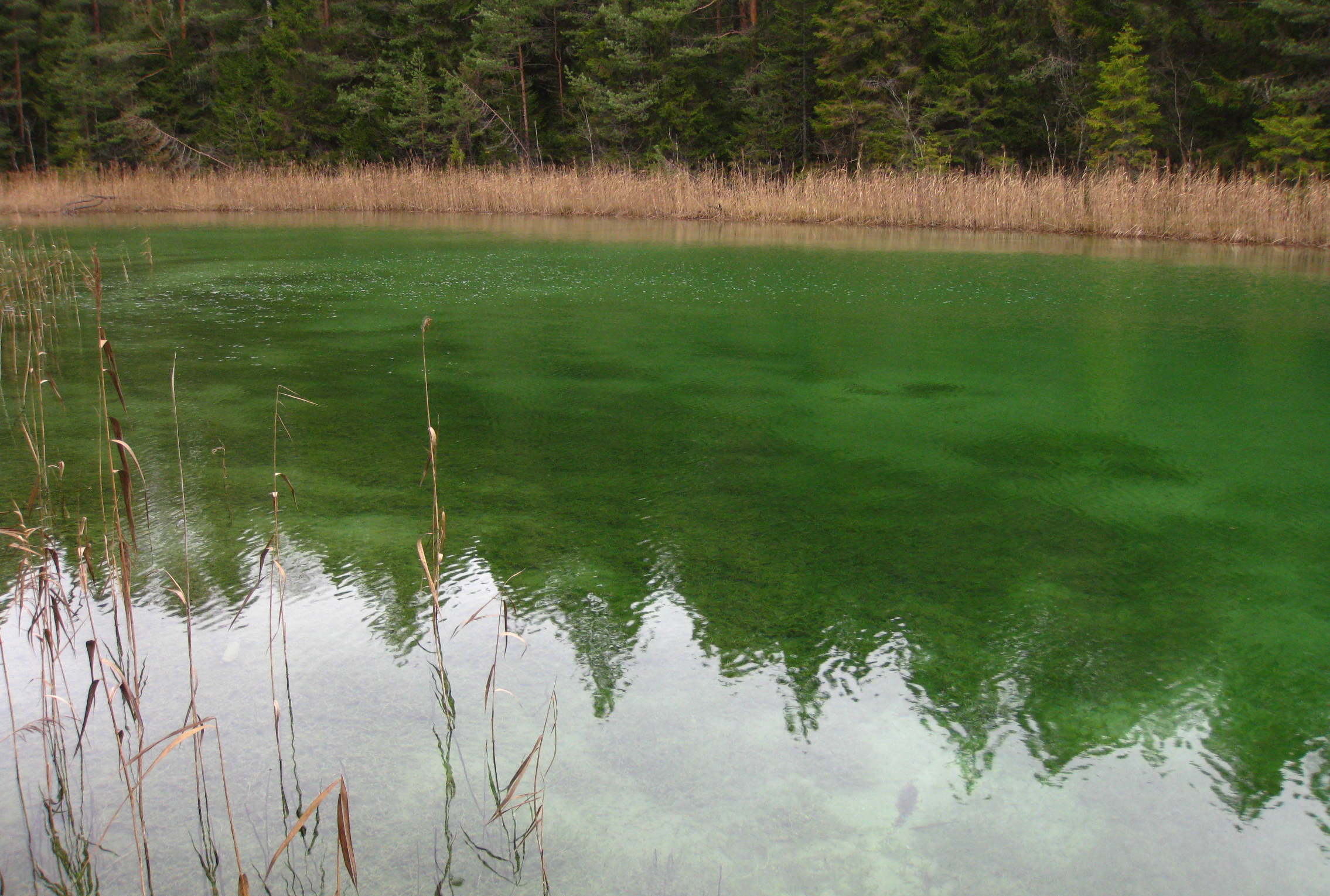
Äntu Vahejärv (Äntu Middle Lake)

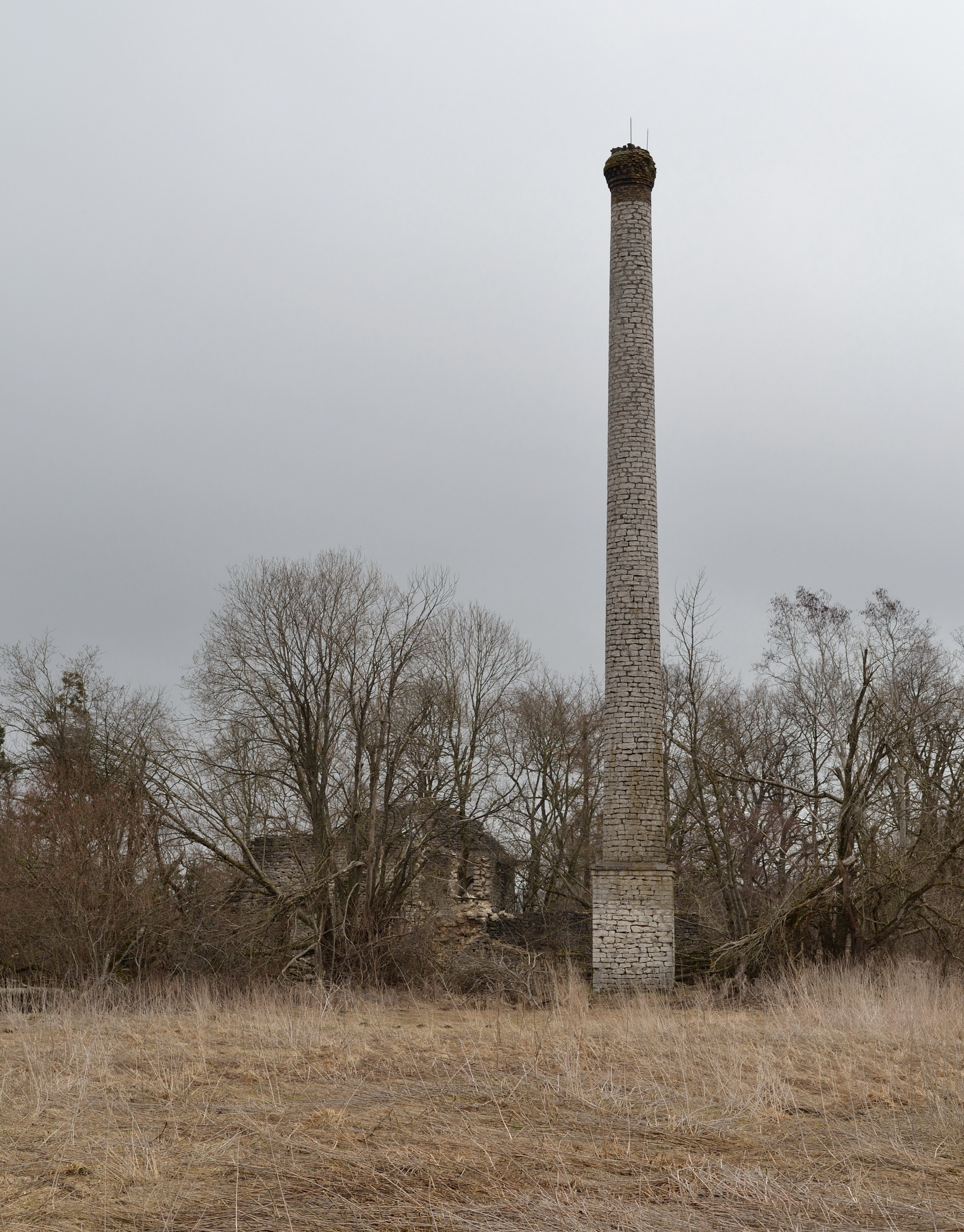
The chimney of Äntu Manor's distillery

== See also ==
- Äntu lakes
