= Julius Eduard Reintam =

Estonian politician (1883–1965)

Julius Eduard Reintam (27 January 1883 Kernu Parish, Harju County - 3 July 1965 Nissi Parish, Harju County) was an Estonian politician. He was a member of Estonian Provincial Assembly.
