= Virumaa =

Historical region in north-eastern Estonia

Vironia Virumaa
- County of Estonia
- c. 1227
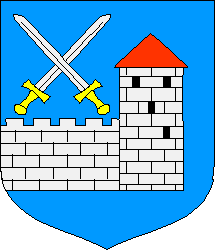
- Coat of arms

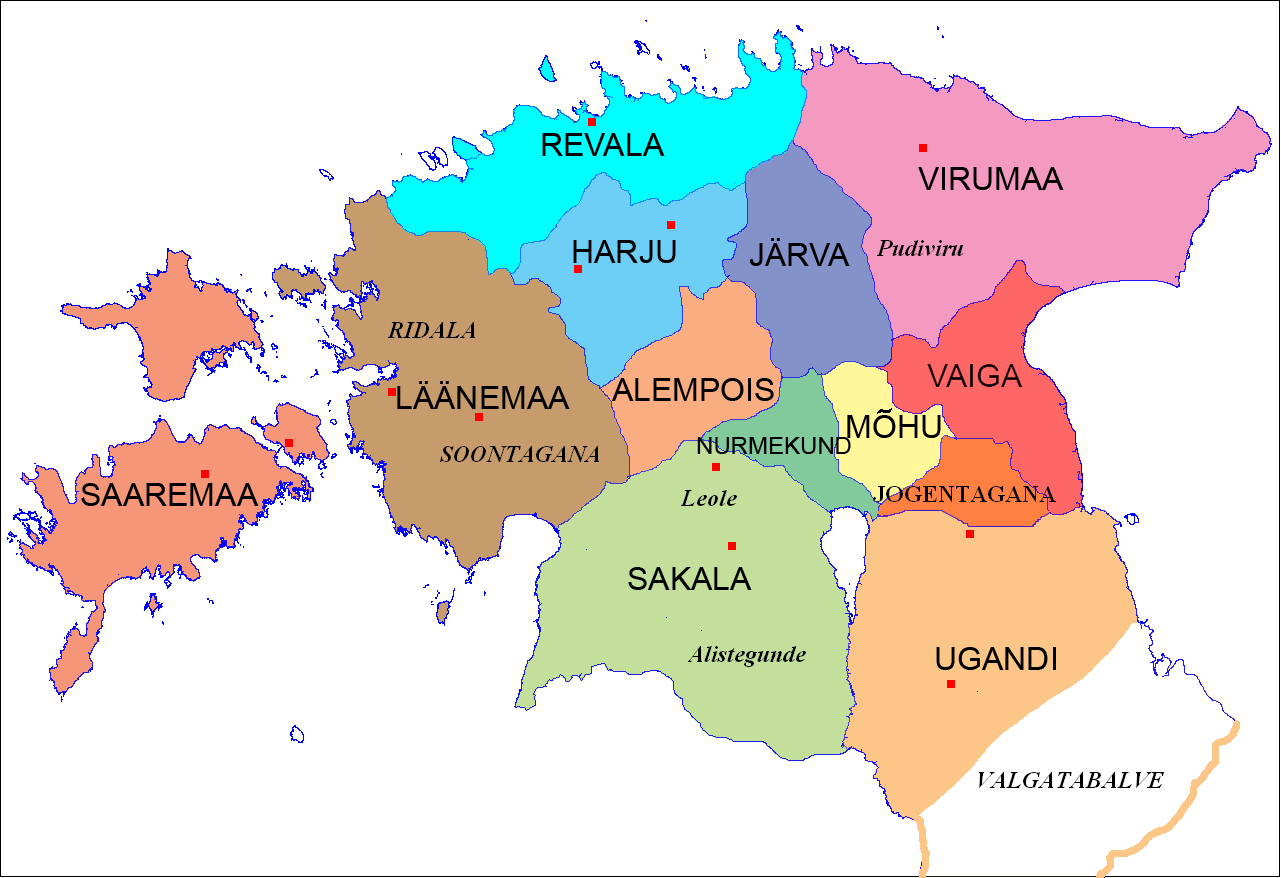
- Ancient Estonia
- Capital: Tarvanpää
- Area
  - Coordinates: 59°10′N 26°30′E
  - 1220: 7,387 km^{2} (2,852 sq mi)
Succeeded by
Danish Estonia

Virumaa or Viru (Latin: Vironia; Low German: Wierland; Old Norse: Virland) is a historical region in northeastern Estonia and a medieval independent Estonian county (maakond). In most part, the historical Virumaa region overlaps with modern Lääne-Viru ("West Viru") and Ida-Viru ("East Viru") counties.

Medieval people of Virumaa, the Vironians, built many strongholds, like Tarwanpe (modern Rakvere) and Agelinde (now Punamägi Hill in Äntu village). Vironians were divided into five clans (kilikunda), Maum (in Estonian "Mahu"), Laemund (Lemmu) also known as Pudiviru, Askele, Revele (Rebala), Alentagh (Alutaguse). Like other Estonian tribes, Vironians remained predominantly pagan before Northern Crusades in the 13th century.

== History ==
According to the Livonian Chronicle of Henry in c. 1229, the pre-Christian Vironians of early 13th century believed that Tharapita, a god worshipped by Osilians (the tribe inhabiting Saaremaa) had been born in Vironia. However, Vironian elder Tabellinus of Pudiviru had endorsed Christianity and had been baptized by Germans in Gotland before the Catholic German and Danish crusaders reached Estonia. Later, when competing Danish crusaders arrived to Vironia, Tabellinnus was suspected of being too pro-German and hanged.

In 1219, German Sword Brethren made a raid against Vironians together with recently christened Letts, Livonians, and several proto-Estonian tribes (Sakalians, Ugaunians and Jervians). After five days of killing and pillaging, Kyriavanus, Tabellinus and other Vironian elders asked for a truce. According to the chronicle, Kyriavanus told he had a "very bad god" before and therefore was ready to accept the Christian god. After truce was made, Vironian elders accepted Christianity. Some sons of elders from all five Vironian clans were taken hostages by the crusaders as part of the truce. In 1221, Vironians took part in failed attempt to oust Danes who had built a fortress in the place of modern Tallinn in the neighboring province of Revelia. Danes retaliated, killed several Vironian elders and put Vironians under heavy taxes.

In 1225, Danes and German crusaders clashed with each other over the ownership of Vironia. In 1226, The papal legate William of Modena arrived to Vironian stronghold of Tarwanpe and mediated peace between Germans, Danes and Estonians. A year later the Vironian territories were taken over by the German Sword Brethren. Vironians sided with the new Papal Legate Baldwin of Alna who in 1230 tried to create a Papal vassal state in northern Estonia, including Vironia. In 1233, the supporters of Baldwin were defeated by the Sword Brethren in the city of Reval (Tallinn). Vironian territories were snatched by the Germans again as Baldwin of Alna complained in his report to the Pope in 1234. The Sword Brethren was also accused of oppressing Vironian converts and expelling local supporters of the Catholic church.

Vironia to Denmark (Danish Estonia).

In 1238, Vironia was given to Denmark again according to the Treaty of Stensby. The area went into hands of powerful vassals of Danish king, many of which were of local origin, like Dietrich of Kievel (probably 'Kivela' - 'land of stone' in Estonian) who controlled eastern part of Vironia, where he started to build the stronghold of Narva. Vironians and Vironian vassals took part in a failed German crusade against Novgorod Republic 1240-1242. The names Virumaa, Vironia and Virland have been continuously used for the northeastern part of Estonia. For example, in 1266, Margaret Sambiria, Dowager Queen of Denmark was named the Lady of Estonia and Virland.

== Parishes ==
- Maum (Mahu)
- Laemund (Lemmu, also known as Pudiviru)
- Askælæ (Äskälä)
- Repel (Rebala)
- Alentagh (Alutaguse)

== Etymology ==
The name Viru probably has Finnic roots (e.g., Finnish language vireä means "vivacious", "lively"). According to an alternative hypothesis the word Viru may have originated from Baltic languages with the meaning 'man' (cf. English word virile). Earliest mention of the name is probably on the Ängby Runestone located in Uppland, Sweden which has inscription in memory of a Viking named Björn who was killed in Virland (uirlant). In Finnish, Estonia is still called Viro after Virumaa. 'Viro' is also present in several Finnish place names like Virolahti, Virojoki and last names (Vironen, Virolainen).

In Estonian, the word virulased is used for inhabitants of modern Virumaa counties or speakers of North Eastern Estonian dialects.

== In popular culture ==
"Graüben, a girl from Virland" (French: "Graüben, jeune Virlandaise") is a character in Jules Verne's 'Journey to the Centre of the Earth'.

Australian author Henry Lawson has written poetry about the mythical "Kingdom of Virland".

The name Vironia was also chosen for Korporatsioon Vironia, an Estonian fraternal student corps founded in 1900.

== See also ==
- Vironians
- Vironia (academic corporation)
- Danish Estonia
