= Estonian Constituent Assembly =

1919 elected organ of Estonia

The Estonian Constituent Assembly (Estonian: Asutav Kogu) was elected on 5–7 April 1919, called by the Estonian Provisional Government during the Estonian War of Independence.

== Activity ==
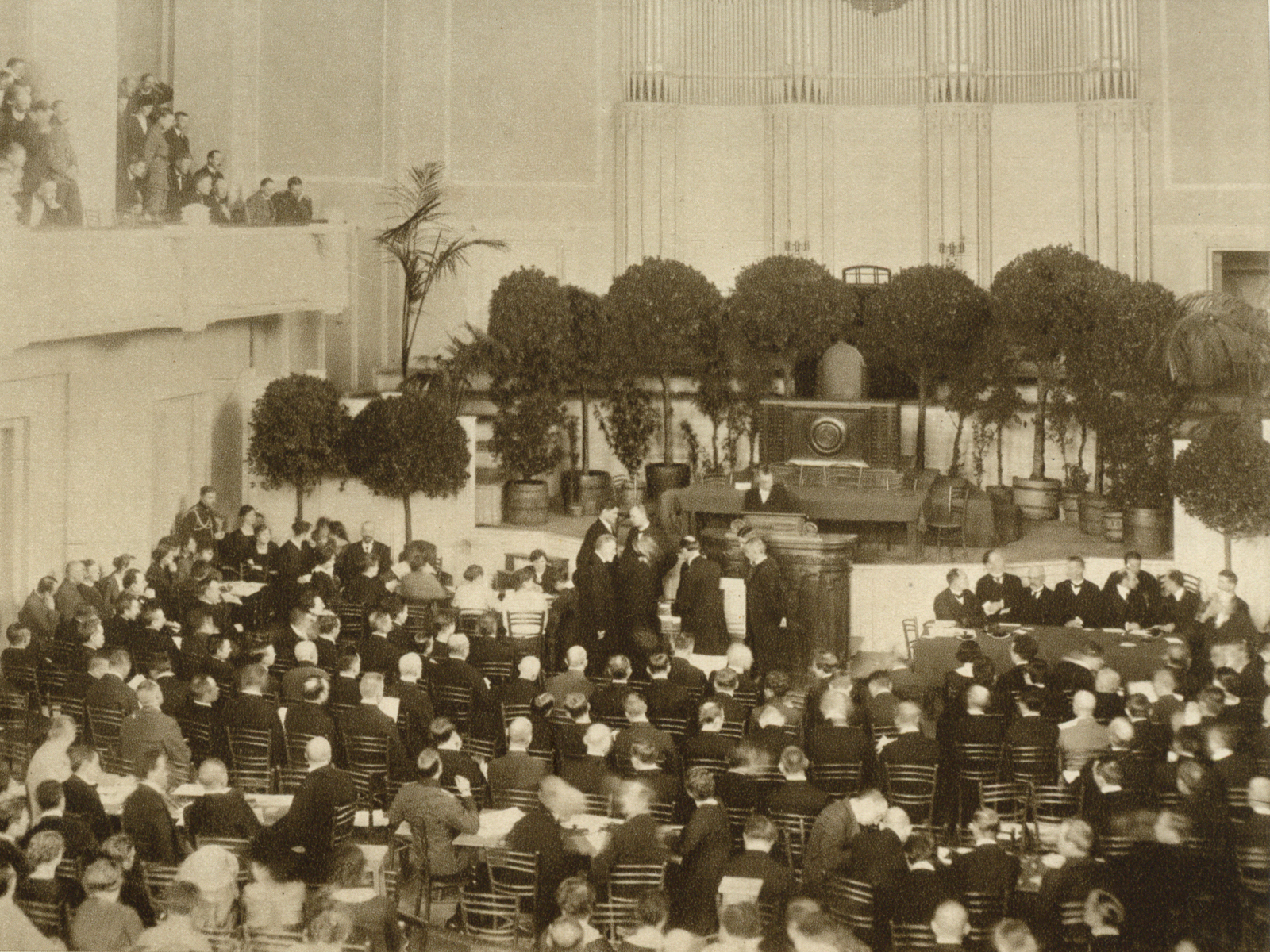
Estonian Constituent Assembly, Opening Session on 23 April 1919

The 120 members of the Constituent Assembly met at the opening session on 23 April 1919, the birthday of the Estonian Parliament and elected the chairman, Social Democrat August Rei. On 7 May, the Assembly passed the Public Elementary Schools Act: The principle of compulsory and free primary 6-year elementary school education was established.

On 8 May 1919, the Estonian provisional government resigned, and the first fully democratically elected Government of Estonia headed by Prime Minister Otto Strandman (Estonian Labor Party) took office. On 15 May, the assembly reaffirmed the Estonian Declaration of Independence, aimed at the international community for recognizing Estonia as an independent state.

On 4 June 1919, the Assembly adopted a temporary Constitution of Estonia, and on 10 October 1919, the Land Reform Act was passed, which confiscated and redistributed the Baltic German estates, ending the 700 years possession of the regions that the Germans had gained after the Livonian Crusade.

On 13 February, the Peace Treaty of Tartu was ratified, signed by Estonia and Russian SFSR on 2 February. The first Constitution of Estonia was adopted on 15 June 1920. After the constitution had entered into effect and the first parliamentary elections were held, the Constituent Assembly disbanded itself on 20 December 1920.
