= Battle of Narva (1918) =

Conflict in the Estonian War of Independence

- Part of the Estonian Independence War and the Soviet westward offensive of 1918-1919
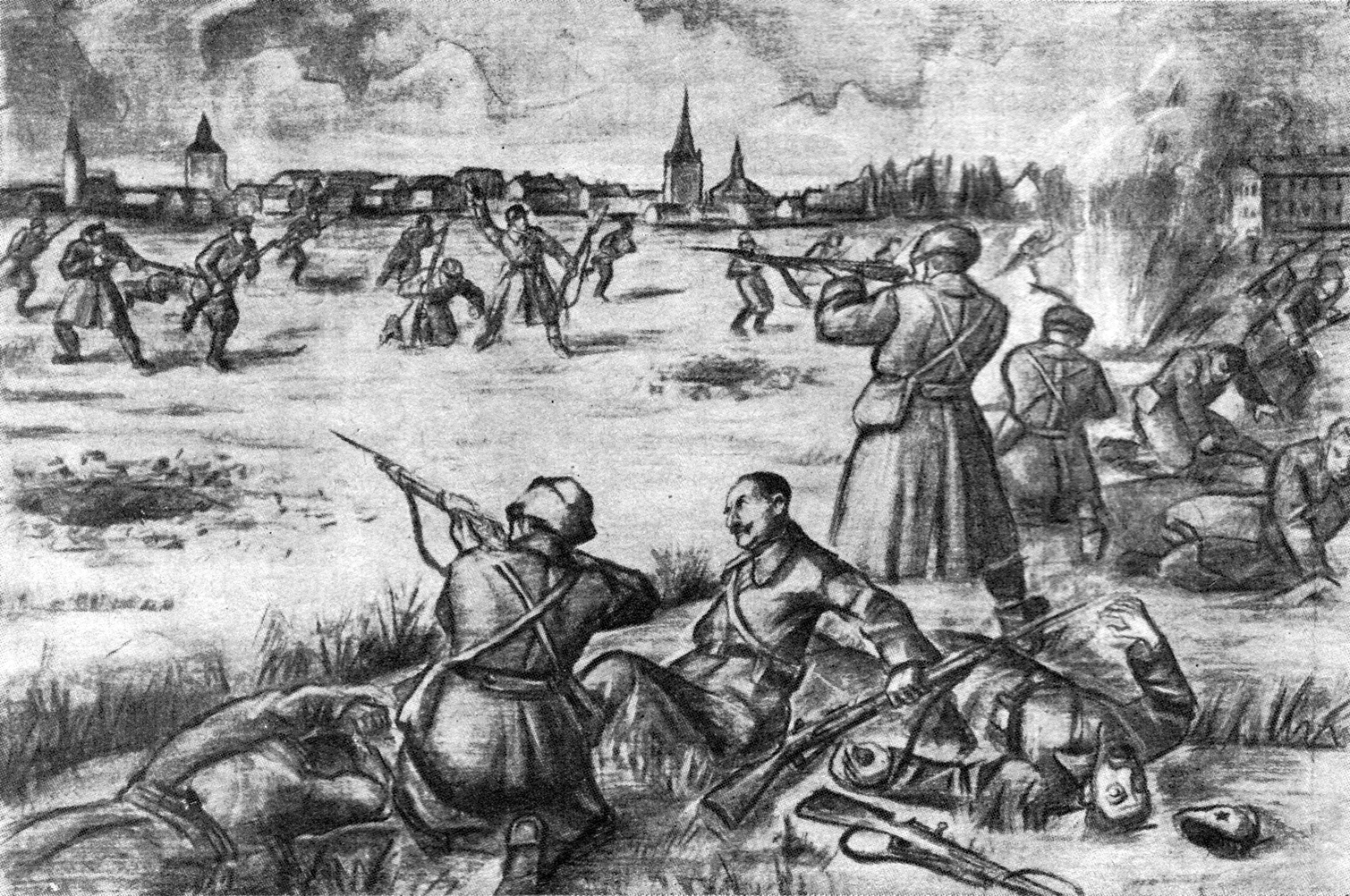
- German-Estonian troops face Russian troops during the Battle of Joala.
Date	28 November 1918
Location	Narva, Estonia
Result	Soviet Victory: Commune of the Working People of Estonia Established
Territorial changes	Narva Isthmus captured by Red Army

Belligerents
Estonia (German Empire) German Infanterie-Regiment Nr. 405	Soviet Russia

The Battle of Narva (Estonian: Narva lahing) took place on 29 November 1918 in the city of Narva and Jaanilinn (now Ivangorod) between troops from the Provisional Government of Estonia and the Russian Red Army. The battle is considered the beginning of the Estonian Independence War. The Infanterie-Regiment Nr. 405 of the German Imperial Army was also involved against the Red Army.

== Background ==
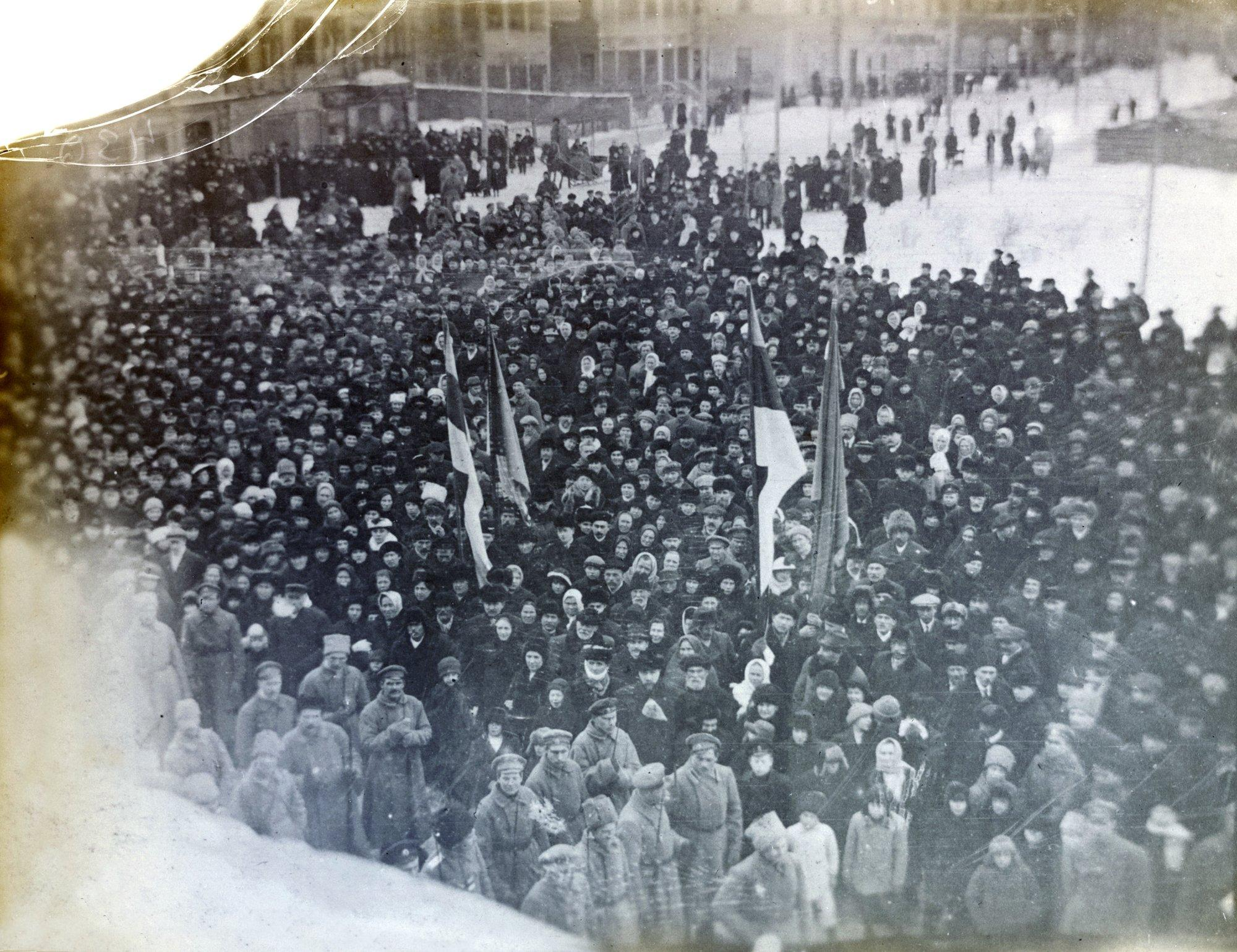
The celebration of the Estonian Declaration of Independence on 23 February 1918, in Pärnu

In October 1917, the German Imperial Army occupied the West Estonian archipelago, and in 1918, most of mainland Estonia was occupied.

On 24 February 1918, the Salvation Committee of the Estonian Provincial Assembly declared the independence of Estonia.

After the formal end of the First World War in November 1918, the German Imperial Army which occupied Estonia was withdrawing from Estonia and other occupied territories. The Russian Bolshevik troops invaded the newly formed country of Estonia in Narva.

The Battle of Narva marked the beginning of the Estonian Independence War.

Bolshevik troops advanced across the Narva River on 22 November but were repelled by German troops. The Battle of Narva was part of the Soviet westward offensive of 1918-1919.

== The Battle ==
On 22 November Bolshevik forces unsuccessfully attempted to capture Narva. On 25 November Finland agreed to provide weapons and ammunition to Estonia. On 28 November Bolshevik forces were ordered to advance into Narva from Kingisepp.

=== Battle of Keldrimäe ===
The first clashes began near the town of Jaanilinn (now Ivangorod) on 28 November, between around 900 German troops and 2,800 Red Army soldiers. Bridges on the Narva River were destroyed by the Germans.

=== Battle of Joala ===
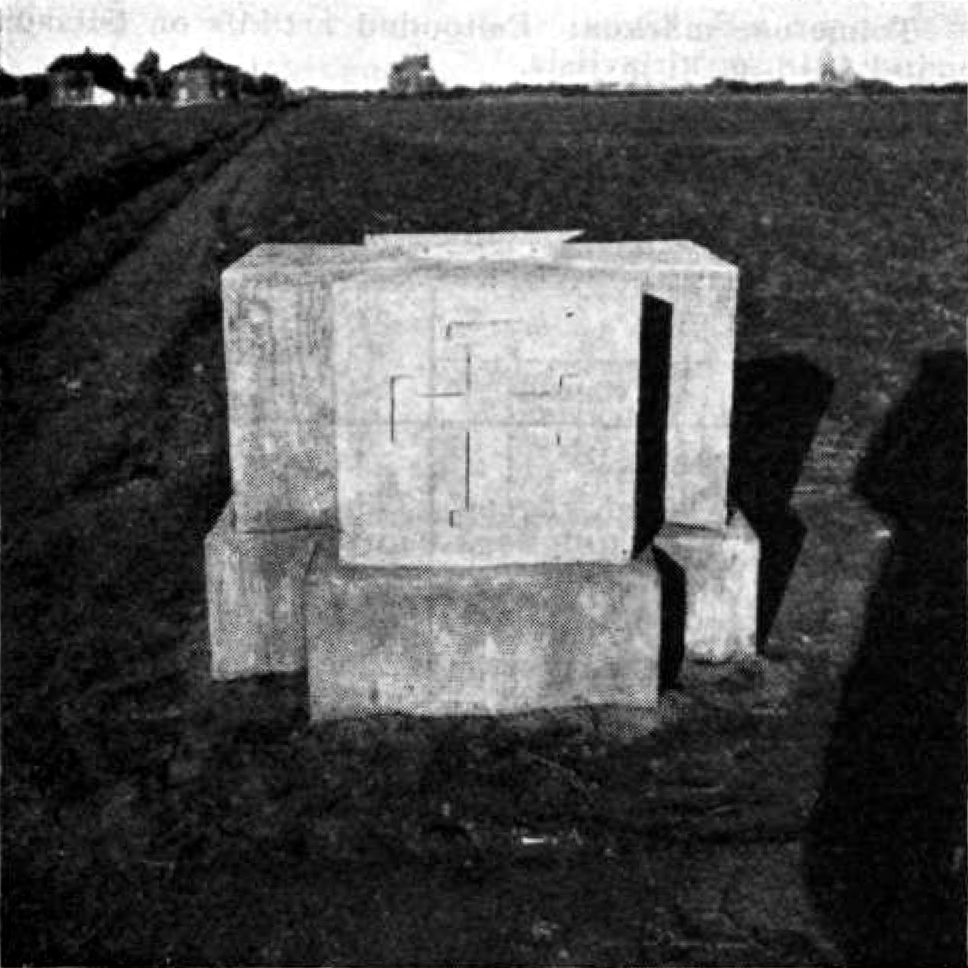
A monument which reads "The Battle of Joala was fought here on 28 November 1918."

The Battle of Joala took place in Joala, Narva, when Bolshevik troops crossed the Narva River and attacked German artillery batteries. The Bolsheviks had the goal of destroying railway and telegraph communication. Estonian and German troops defended Narva until the Bolshevik forces were repelled. Jaan Sihver was killed in the battle. Red Army troops made preparations to cross the Narva river in boats. Germans and Estonians made successful efforts to repel the Red Army troops.

=== Capture of Narva ===
A detachment of 500 Bolshevik soldiers were deployed from the Bolshevik cruiser Oleg and other Bolshevik destroyers in Narva-Jõesuu. German troops retreated west, and, fearing encirclement, Estonian troops retreated west. German troops destroyed a railway which lead into Narva. The Red Army captured Narva and Jaanilinn later on 28 and 29 November 1918.

== Outcome ==
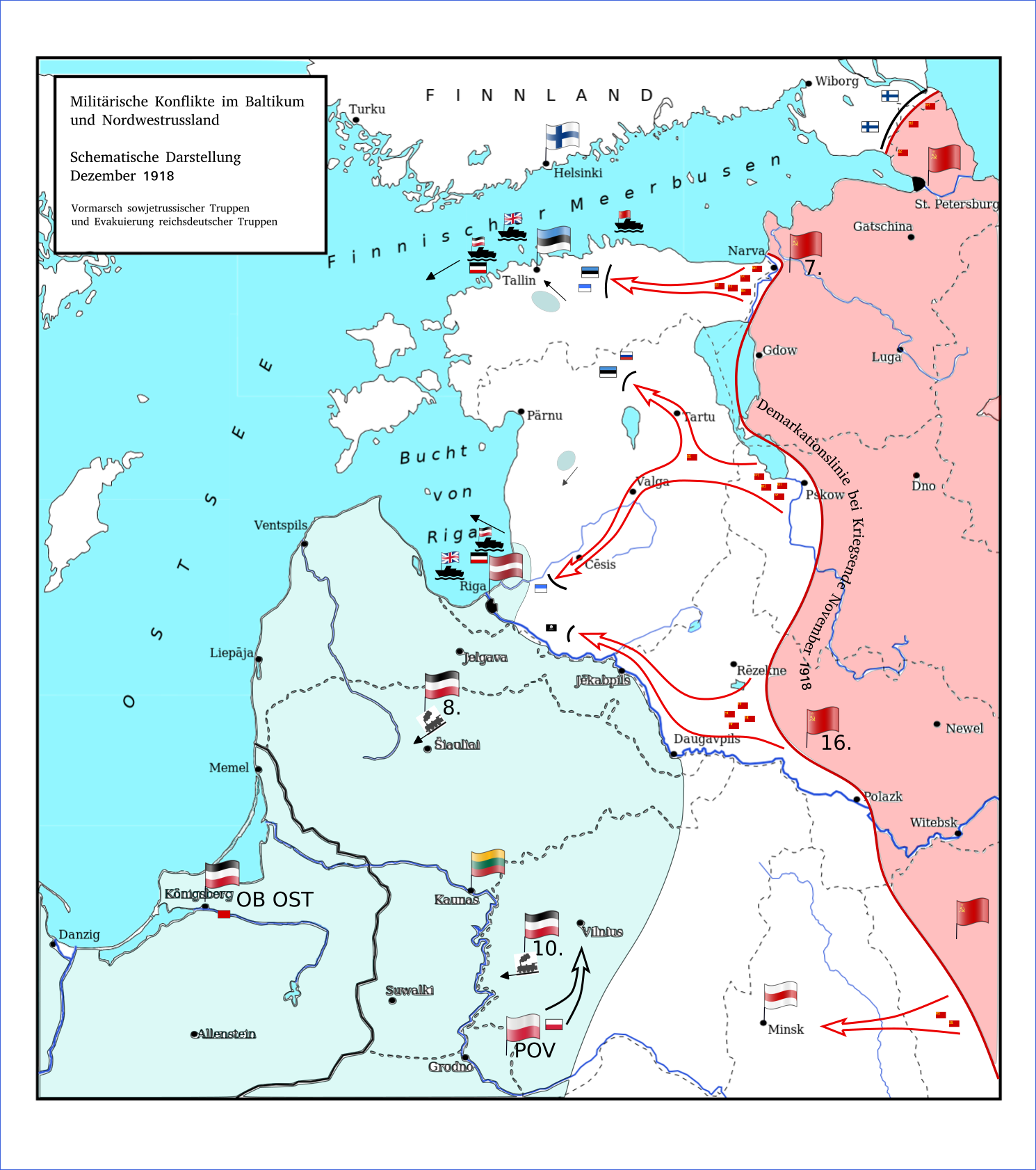
Map of troop movement in the Baltics and North Western Russia in December 1918

The Red Army captured Narva and Jaanilinn on 28 and 29 November 1918, starting the Estonian War of Independence. Bolsheviks established the Commune of the Working People of Estonia (Estonian: Eesti Töörahva Kommuuna) on 29 November 1918 in Bolshevik-occupied territories in Estonia. The Red Army continued to advance towards Tallinn in December 1918. Germans withdrew from Estonia
