= Estonian Red Riflemen =

Estonian military unit, subordinated to Soviet Russia

Eesti Kütiväed Estonian Riflemen
- The flag of the Commune of the Working People of Estonia
- Active: from February 23, 1918
- Country: Soviet Russia; Commune of the Working People of Estonia
- Size: c. 6,000
- Patron: Jaan Anvelt
- Mottos: Kõigi maade proletaarlased, ühinege! Proletarians of all countries, unite!
- March: The Internationale
- Anniversaries: February 23
- Engagements: Battle of Keila; Battle of Narva; Battle of Vastseliina; Battle of Räpina; Voronezh–Kastornoye operation (1919)

Commanders
- Notable commanders: Viktor Kingissepp; Andrei Põld; Otto Rästas; Jaan Sihver; Georg Sommer; Jakob Palvadre

Estonian Riflemen, Estonian Red Riflemen, Estonian Red Army, Estonian Red Guards (Estonian: Eesti Kütiväed, Eesti Punased Kütid, Eestimaa Punaarmee, Eesti Punakaart) were military formations assembled starting 1917 in the Soviet Russia.

== Formation ==
Initially the battalions were formed by volunteers, and by conscription among the Estonian population. A total of about 5,000 men were drafted into the Estonian Riflemen Division. As late as November 1918 the fate of the country was still up for grabs, and the Bolshevik alternative was attractive to all those for whom a social revolution promised a new life.

== Russian Civil War and Estonian War of Independence ==
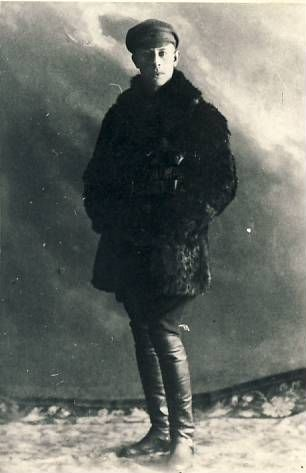
August Lillakas the commander of the 3rd Tartu Rifle Regiment of the Estonian Red Army (1919)

The Estonian Riflemen actively participated in the Russian Civil War and the Estonian War of Independence. The Riflemen took an active part in the suppression of anti-Bolshevik uprisings in Moscow and Yaroslavl in 1918. The Estonian Riflemen were instrumental in the attempt to establish the Commune of the Working People of Estonia while the elections to the Estonian Constituent Assembly in April 1919 demonstrated the victory of the independent nation state alternative. Simultaneously, the success of the Estonian Social Democratic Workers' Party served to demonstrate the lingering attractiveness of a social revolution within the national framework. Although the Estonian Army had attained control over the territory of Estonia by May 1919, its Estonian Red Army counterpart still active and the High Command of the Estonian Army decided to push their defence lines across the border into the Pskov region. The offensive of the Petseri Battle Group began on May 13. The operation destroyed the Estonian Red Army, and captured Pskov on May 25, 1919. Re-formed in the rear, they fought against Anton Ivanovich Denikin, Nikolay Yudenich, and Pyotr Nikolayevich Wrangel.

== Surrendering to Makhno in 1920 ==
All through February, 1920 the Makhnovshchina was inundated with Red troops, including the 42nd Rifle Division and the Latvian & Estonian Division – in total at least 20,000 soldiers. After the souring and dissolution of Nestor Makhno's Revolutionary Insurgent Army of Ukraine's alliance with the Bolsheviks, captured Red commanders and commissars were summarily executed. However, Makhno usually preferred to release the disarmed enlisted men that were captured, as "proletarian brothers", with a choice of joining his army or returning home, after all commanding officers were executed. This happened to an Estonian Red Army unit that surrendered to Makhno in 1920. Viktor Bilash noted that even in the worst time for the revolutionary army, namely at the beginning of 1920, "In the majority of cases rank-and-file Red Army soldiers were set free". Of course Bilash, as a colleague of Makhno's, was likely to idealize the punishment policies of the Batko. However, the facts bear witness that Makhno really did release "in all four directions" captured Red Army soldiers. This is what happened at the beginning of February 1920, when the insurgents disarmed the 10,000-strong Estonian Division in Huliaipole. To this it must be added that the Revolutionary Insurrectionary Army of Ukraine included a choir of Estonian musicians. The problem was further compounded by the alienation of the Estonians by Anton Denikin's inflexible Russian chauvinism and their refusal to fight with Nikolai Yudenich.

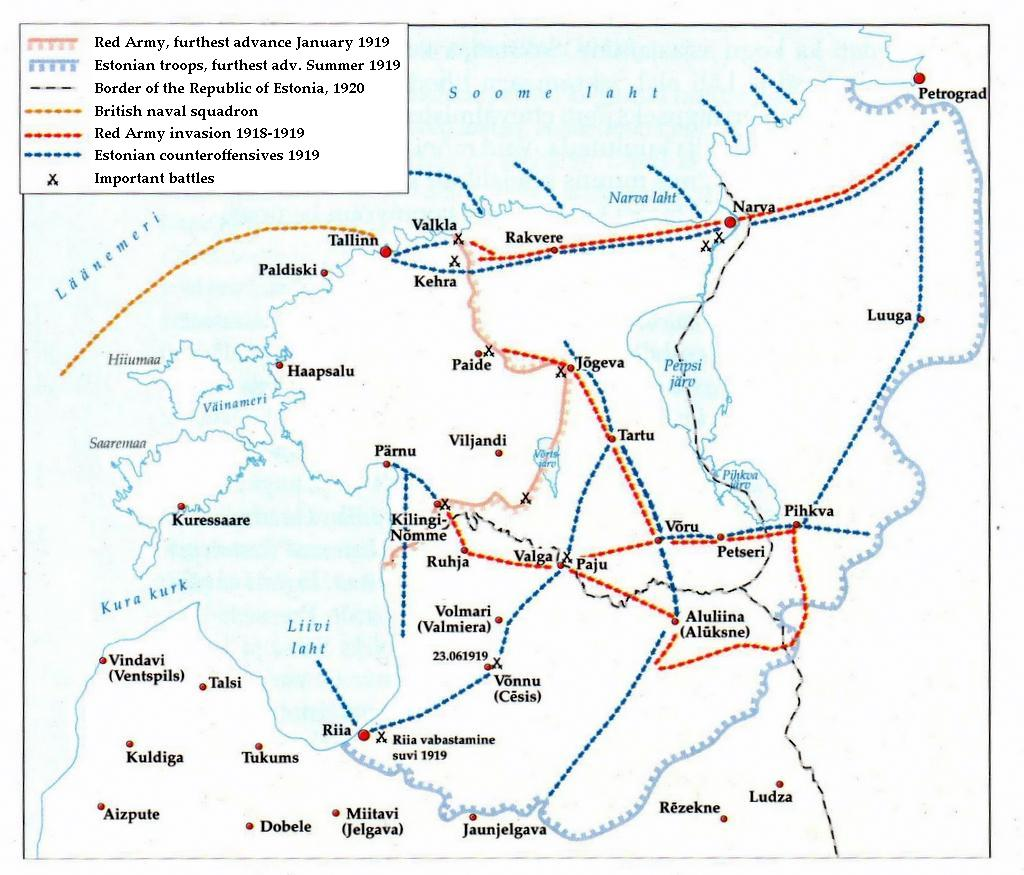
The Estonian War of Independence and the Russian Civil War, 1918–1919

== See also ==
- Aftermath of World War I
- Black Guards
- Estonian War of Independence
- Freikorps in the Baltic
- Ober Ost
- Red Guards
- Sich Riflemen
- Soviet westward offensive of 1918–1919
- United Baltic Duchy
