= Tartu Credit Center massacre =

1919 massacre in Tartu, Estonia committed by the Soviet Cheka

- Part of the Red Terror and the 1919 Battle of Tartu
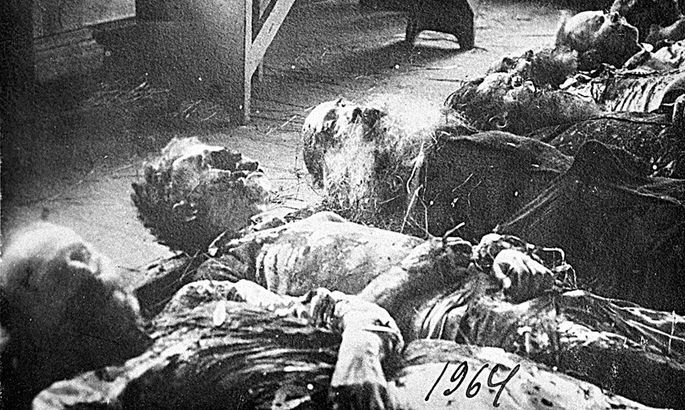
- Corpses of the massacre's victims
- Location: 58°22′54″N 26°43′24″E; Kompanii 3, Tartu, Estonia
- Date: 14 January 1919 (EET)
- Target: Estonian religious figures and others
- Attack type: Massacre, war crime
- Deaths: 19
- Perpetrator: (Russian Soviet Federative Socialist Republic) Cheka

The Tartu Credit Center massacre (Estonian: Tartu Krediidikassa massimõrv) was the mass execution of 19 people by the Soviet secret police (then called Cheka). The massacre occurred in the basement of the former Credit Center in Tartu, Estonia, on 14 January 1919.

The execution was carried out by order of the Tartu Commission for Combating Counter-Revolution of the Estonian Labor Commune immediately before the retreat of the Red Army from Tartu. Its most prominent victim was Platon Kulbusch, the first Estonian Orthodox bishop.

== Background ==
The massacre at the Tartu Credit Center was part of the Red Army's policy of intimidation and extermination known as the Red Terror. The basis of the Red Terror in Soviet Russia was the Decree "On the Red Terror" of 5 September 1918, which ordered the execution of so-called "enemies of the people" or their placement in concentration camps. The decree is considered the official response of the Soviet government to the murder of V. Volodarsky and Moisei Uritsky by the Popular Socialist Party. Although the Cheka had already begun mass executions before the decree was issued, it created the legal basis for the terror. Not all Soviet party leaders approved of the activities of the Cheka and the excessive powers granted to it; it was criticised, among others, by Nikolai Bukharin, Lev Kamenev, Mikhail Olminsky, and Grigory Petrovsky.

In Estonia, the Red Terror was carried out in 1918–1919 in the territory controlled by the Commune of the Working People of Estonia. Since the commune was formally an independent, and in reality to some extent autonomous, entity, the legislation adopted in Soviet Russia did not automatically apply to it. Thus, the activities of the counterrevolution committees created in Estonia on the model of the Cheka were based on the provisions and manifestos issued by the Provisional Revolutionary Committee of Estonia and the Council of the Commune of the Working People of Estonia. For example, on 21 November 1918, all non-Bolshevik parties and their newspapers were banned, with a threat to deal with their party leaders "with all revolutionary cruelty"; on 29 November of the same year, members and supporters of the Provisional Government of Estonia, as well as all landowners and clergy, were declared outlaws.

=== Activities of the Tartu Commission for Combating Counter-Revolution ===
The Tartu branch of the Estonian Commission for Combating Counter-Revolution began its activities on 1 January 1919. Aleksander Kull, who had experience working in the Petrograd Cheka, was appointed its chairman.

The commission began its activities with mass arrests on 2 January, although arrests and detentions had already been carried out before the commission was formed, after the capture of Tartu by the Red Army on 22 December 1918. The commission's activities expanded and became bloodier after an operation by the partisan Julius Kuperjanov in Elistvere parish on 4 January, during which former Red Rifleman Johannes Pärn was killed. In response to this, the commission organized several punitive operations that ended in mass murders: on 9 January 1919, 13 people were executed on the ice of the Emajõgi River in Tartu, including four landowners from Tartu County (including Bruno Claudius Alexander von Samson-Himmelstjerna, Carl Harald Eugen von Samson-Himmelstjerna, and Edmund Gustav Wilhelm von Samson-Himmelstjerna); on 12 January 1919, a punitive force was sent to Elistvere Parish, where eight local peasants were killed.

By order of the commission, a total of 512 people were arrested in Tartu and its immediate surroundings from 1 to 14 January 1919 and held mainly in two places: the commission's headquarters on Gildi Street and the former building of the Credit Bank on Kompani Street. The detainees were interrogated as counter-revolutionaries and also forced to perform humiliating physical labour.

== Execution ==
Immediately before the liberation of Tartu by the 2nd Division of the Estonian People's Army, the chairman of the Tartu Counter-Revolutionary Commission Aleksander Kull ordered the execution of 19 people held in the basement of the former Tartu Credit Centre on Kompani Street. Among those executed were Orthodox Bishop Platon Kulbusch, two Orthodox high priests (Nikolai Bezhanitsky and Mikhail Bleive), two Lutheran pastors, professors of theology at the University of Tartu (Gotthilft Traugott Hahn and Moritz Wilhelm Paul Schwartz), three estate owners, one estate manager, one restaurant owner, two city councilors, the head of the Baltic Germans in Tartu Arnold Johann Heinrich von Tideböhl, a lawyer, a potter, a student, and even a Red Army soldier with a Russian surname.

Arved von Vegesack wrote the following about the executions on 14 January in his booklet Dorpat, Compagnie-Strasse 5 vom 3. bis 14. Januar 1919 : ein Zeiterlebnis, published later in 1919:

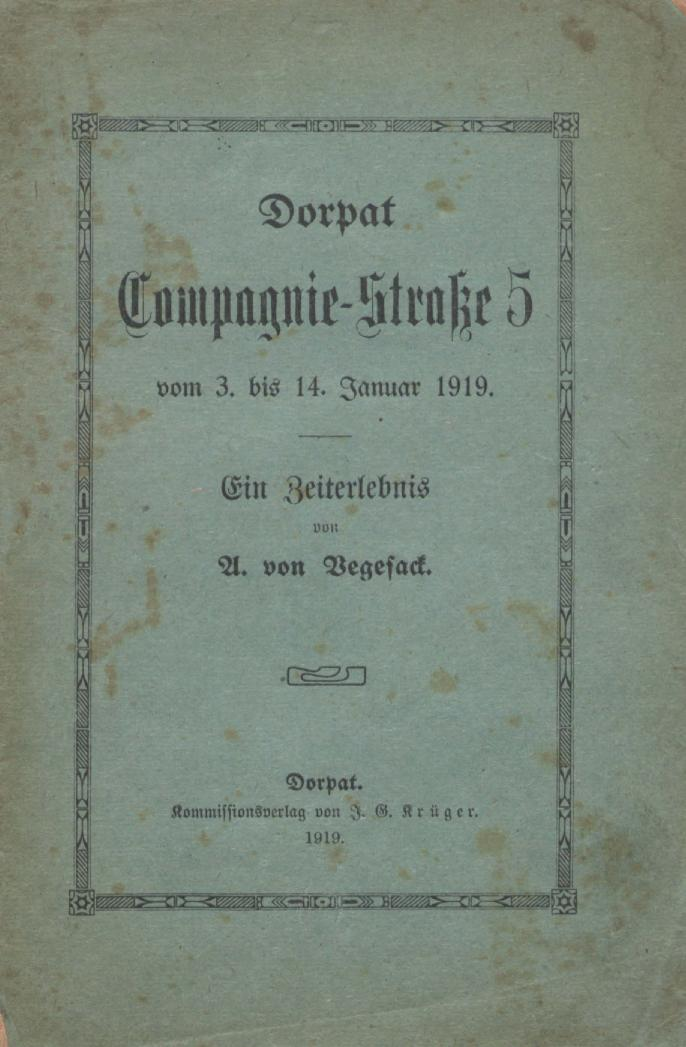
Arved von Vegesack's booklet about the Tartu Credit Bank Massacre

"Tuesday, 14 January, begins like any other day. Nothing betrays the imminent change in our situation. Our relatives come across the yard as usual with their food parcels.

Then suddenly it goes like wildfire from mouth to mouth: a lady in the next room has received word through the window that the White Guards' entry into the city is imminent and that the Reds are preparing their departure and have already left in part during the night.

There must be some truth to the rumor because immediately afterwards all the windows and shutters are closed and the distribution of breakfast is suddenly interrupted. I see that the room where our relatives usually deliver their parcels is now filled with armed men. The vision lasts only a moment, then the doors close. A loud and commanding voice announces: No one is entering except the convoy.

Then we who are staying in the corridor are ordered to retreat to our rooms. A police officer enters, a short man in civilian clothes with a black fur cap. He looks intelligent and energetic, but his facial expression also betrays unbridled passion and brutality. He is followed by two armed men. The police officer holds a list in his hand. He calls out Bishop Platon's name and orders him to put on his outdoor clothing and follow him.

A few minutes pass and then we hear a muffled detonation below us, the meaning of which we cannot yet fathom. Shortly afterwards, the police officer returns with his companions and, in the same way as last time, calls out the name of another Greek Orthodox priest. The same sequence of events repeats itself. At the moment when the detonation is heard again, it is as if a blindfold has fallen from our eyes. "It's in the basement below us," whispers the person standing closest. Nothing more is said. We look at each other and understand.

What we experience in our hearts during the following half hour cannot be expressed in words. A thousand different thoughts race through our heads. Memories of brief moments in our former lives, instinctive expressions of our self-preservation drive, confused ideas about how we could save ourselves and much, much more.

One by one, many in our room are called up and disappear, and constantly, after regular short interruptions, the terrible detonations in the basement follow.

I see how the elderly priest Beshanitski, whom we call the patriarch, calmly and composedly sets out on his last journey, I see Professor Hahn rise from his seat, wrap his cloak around himself and, without looking back, slowly, with long strides leave the room. I can still feel Herr von Krause's last warm handshake. Always new victims! The minutes feel like eternities. The line of unfortunates never seems to end. Each of us expects to be next and for many of us it will be the case."

The executions were carried out by the 2nd Viljandi Penal Squad, formed from the Estonian Red Riflemen Regiment, led by Commissar Aleksander Jea. Two days earlier, the same squad had carried out executions in Elistvere Parish. It consisted of 117 men in total.

After the massacre, Kull and his subordinates left on an armored train for Võru, which was still under the control of the Red Army. Before that, on Promenaadi Street, the Bolsheviks managed to catch the city council accountant Vilde and the city architect Arved Eichhorn, who were taken to Pepleri Street to be shot. Eichhorn survived, but was seriously wounded.

According to the Bolshevik newspaper Edasi, published in Võru on 16 January 1919, the executions were motivated by the fact that on the morning of 14 January, an attempt was made on the life of Aleksander Kull, the chairman of the commission for combating counter-revolution: he was served poisoned coffee. However, the Estonian historian Taavi Minnik believes that these shootings were primarily as revenge for the activities of the Kuperjanov Partisan Battalion.

=== Discovery of the bodies ===
The guards, who were Red Army soldiers, left their post on 14 January, immediately after serving lunch to the prisoners. Shortly after, about 200 detainees in the building of the former Credit Center were able to escape with the help of the townspeople. It is not known who exactly discovered the bodies of the victims in the basement of the building.

Surgeon Karl Wolfgang Rudolf von Reyher, one of the first to examine the execution site, was a student and long-time assistant of the famous medical scientist Werner Zoege von Manteuffel. He established that the victims were brought into the basement one by one and were killed with a sideways shot to the head.

Later forensic examination revealed that some of those executed had been beaten, bayoneted, and shot several times before their deaths. Bishop Platon had been stabbed seven times in the chest, and four bullet wounds were found on his body: two bullets had pierced his chest, one bullet had pierced his left shoulder, and one bullet had passed through his right eye. There were also signs of beatings on his body, including a punch to his right temple. Orthodox priests Bezhanitsky and Blyve were killed with a single shot. The dead men had their outer clothing and shoes removed; some witnesses said this was done before their executions.

==== Media coverage ====
News of the massacre quickly spread through the media in Estonia. The Tartu daily Postimees reported on the murders on the front page of its 15 January issue. The Tallinn-based Päevaleht published a more detailed account of the massacre on 16 January, naming the victims.

One of the prisoners in the credit centre was the Baltic German nobleman Arved von Vegesack who had been arrested on 3 January. He survived the massacre and two weeks after the escape of the Bolsheviks he started publishing an account of the events in Dorpater Zeitung. Later his articles were published separately as a 27 page booklet titled Dorpat, Compagnie-Strasse 5 vom 3. bis 14. Januar 1919 : ein Zeiterlebnis.

As soon as news of the massacre reached Paris, the press attaché of the Estonian delegation to the Paris Peace Conference, Eduard Laaman, sent information about it to the world's leading newspapers. According to available information, his message was published only in the New York Herald.

The Western world was informed about the massacres in Tartu and Rakvere organised by the Bolsheviks by the writer Eduard Vilde, head of the Estonian News Bureau in Copenhagen, whose description of the massacres, together with photographs, was initially published in the largest French illustrated magazine, L'Illustration, under the title "Lescrime du bolchevisme en Esthonie".

== Commemoration ==
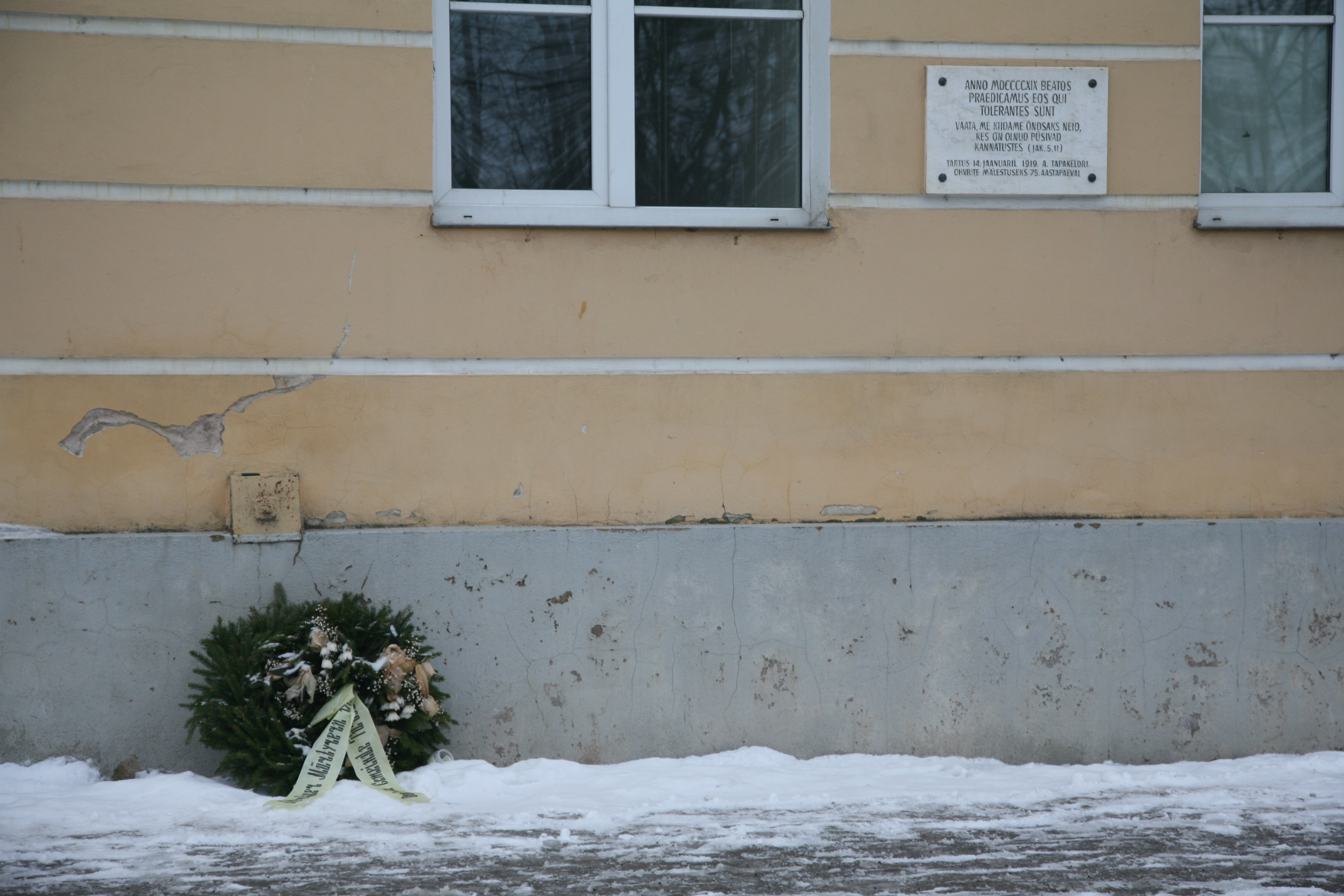
Wreath at the memorial plaque on 3 Kompani Street, Tartu, February 2013

Today, the site of the murder is marked by a memorial plaque on the wall of the building at 3 Kompani Street. In 2003, a bronze bas-relief of Bishop Platon by Tõnis Paberit was installed on the wall of the same building.

Shortly after the massacre, a prayer service for the souls of Bishop Platon and other victims was held in the Paris Orthodox Cathedral on the orders of Jaan Poska, the head of the Estonian delegation to the Paris Peace Conference. All members of the Estonian delegation, led by Poska, attended the service.

During the interwar period, prayers for the victims of the massacres were held in the former building of the Tartu Credit Center. This tradition was started in January 1922 by the clergy of the Orthodox parishes of Tartu; in January 1923, the Lutheran clergy joined them, and the prayers acquired an ecumenical character. Metropolitan Aleksander Paulus of Tallinn and All Estonia and later the bishops of the Estonian Evangelical Lutheran Church always participated in these prayers. In the late 1920s, prayers and memorial services for the victims began to be held in Orthodox and Lutheran churches in Tartu on 14 January. With the participation of representatives of both churches, a committee for perpetuating the memory of the victims was created, under whose leadership the basement where the massacre took place was rebuilt into a memorial chapel. It was consecrated on 14 January 1931.

The memory of the victims of the massacre was also honoured after the restoration of Estonia's independence, in January 2009, as part of events marking the anniversary of the liberation of Tartu from the Bolsheviks.

Priests Platon Kulbush, Nikolai Bezhanitsky, and Mikhail Bleive were canonized as hieromartyrs in the Eastern Orthodox Church.

== See also ==
- NKVD prisoner massacre in Tartu
