= Maatamees =

Estonian-language newspaper (1917–1918)

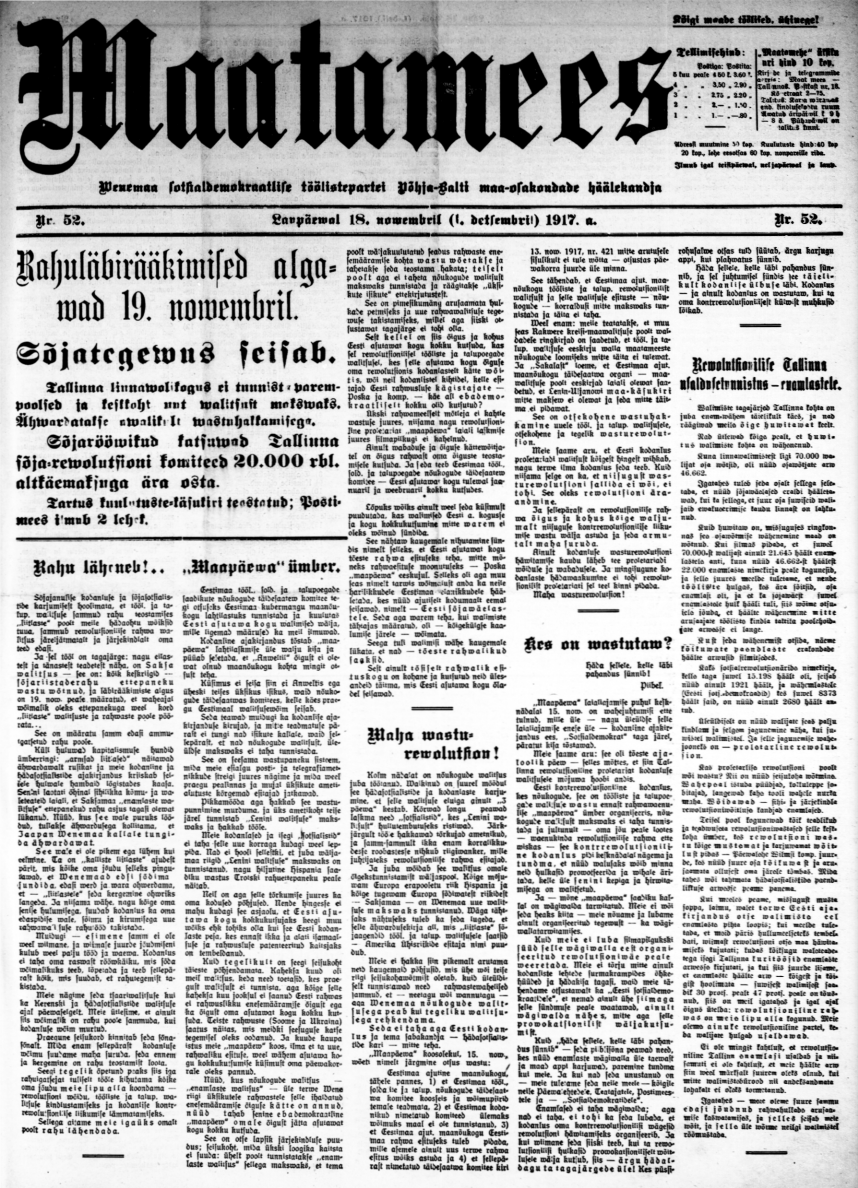
- 18 November (1 December) 1917 issue of Maatamees
- Type: Weekly (July 1917), Thrice Weekly (August 1917 – February 1918)
- Editor-in-chief: Hans Pöögelmann
- Founded: July 14, 1917
- Ceased publication: February 22, 1918
- Political alignment: Bolshevik
- Language: Estonian language
- City: Reval
- Country: Russia
- Circulation: 4,000
- Sister newspapers: Tööline, Zvezda, Laukstrādnieku Cīņa
- Website: Digital archive

Maatamees ('Landless Peasant') was an Estonian-language newspaper published from Reval (Tallinn), Autonomous Governorate of Estonia, Russia between 14 July [O.S. 1 July] 1917 and 22 February 1918. The newspaper was an organ of the Rural Sections of the North Baltic Committee of the Russian Social Democratic Labour Party (Bolsheviks). Maatamees had a circulation of about 4,000 copies. All in all, 84 issues of Maatamees were published.

== Editorial team ==
Hans Pöögelmann, a revolutionary writer who had recently returned from exile in the United States, was the editor of Maatamees. The editorial board included Jaan Anvelt and Jaan Sihver, the latter being a former political forced labourer and having moved from Moscow to Reval in July 1917. Viktor Kingissepp was an active contributor to the newspaper.

== Launching of Maatamees and July Days ==
The decision to launch a publication for mobilizing support for the party among the Estonian peasantry was taken at a plenum of North Baltic Organizations of the Russian Social Democratic Labour Party (Bolsheviks) held in Reval 18–19 June 1917. In July 1917 Matamees began weekly publication. During the July Days, the Bolshevik organs in Estonia Kiir and Utro Pravdy were closed down by the local soviet following orders from Boris Dudorov. Maatamees was able to continue publication, albeit it had a different, more rural readership than the banned Bolshevik newspapers.

== August 1917 – thrice weekly ==
From August 1917 onwards, Maatamees was published thrice weekly. On 13 August 1917, following the holding of the Conference of North Baltic Organizations of the Russian Social Democratic Labour Party (Bolsheviks), a Convention of Estonian Landless Peasants was held in Reval. The Convention took Bolshevik positions and a Provisional Executive Committee of the Estonian Landless Peasants with representatives of all rural districts was elected. Furthermore, a 3-member Central Bureau was elected, consisting of Pöögelmann, Sihver and Johannes Heintuk. The Convention recognized Maatamees as the organ of the peasantry.

== Profile ==
The newspaper published texts of Lenin, decisions of the higher party bodies and news pieces drafted by a network of rural correspondents. During the campaigning for the 1917 Russian Constituent Assembly election, the final version of the local Bolshevik electoral platform was published in Maatamees by mid-October. Maatamees had a Latvian language counterpart, Laukstrādnieku Cīņa ('Struggle of Farm Workers').

== Closure ==
The publishing of Maatamees was ended at the onset of the German occupation of Estonia.
