= Vistula Offensive =

Vistula Offensive can refer to:

- Soviet westward offensive of 1918–1919
- Soviet Vistula-Oder Offensive in 1945
