= Order of Bishop Platon =

Estonian award

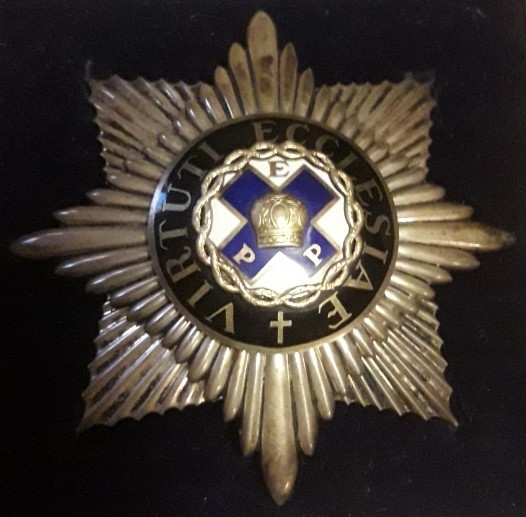
The Order of Bishop Platon (1st class)

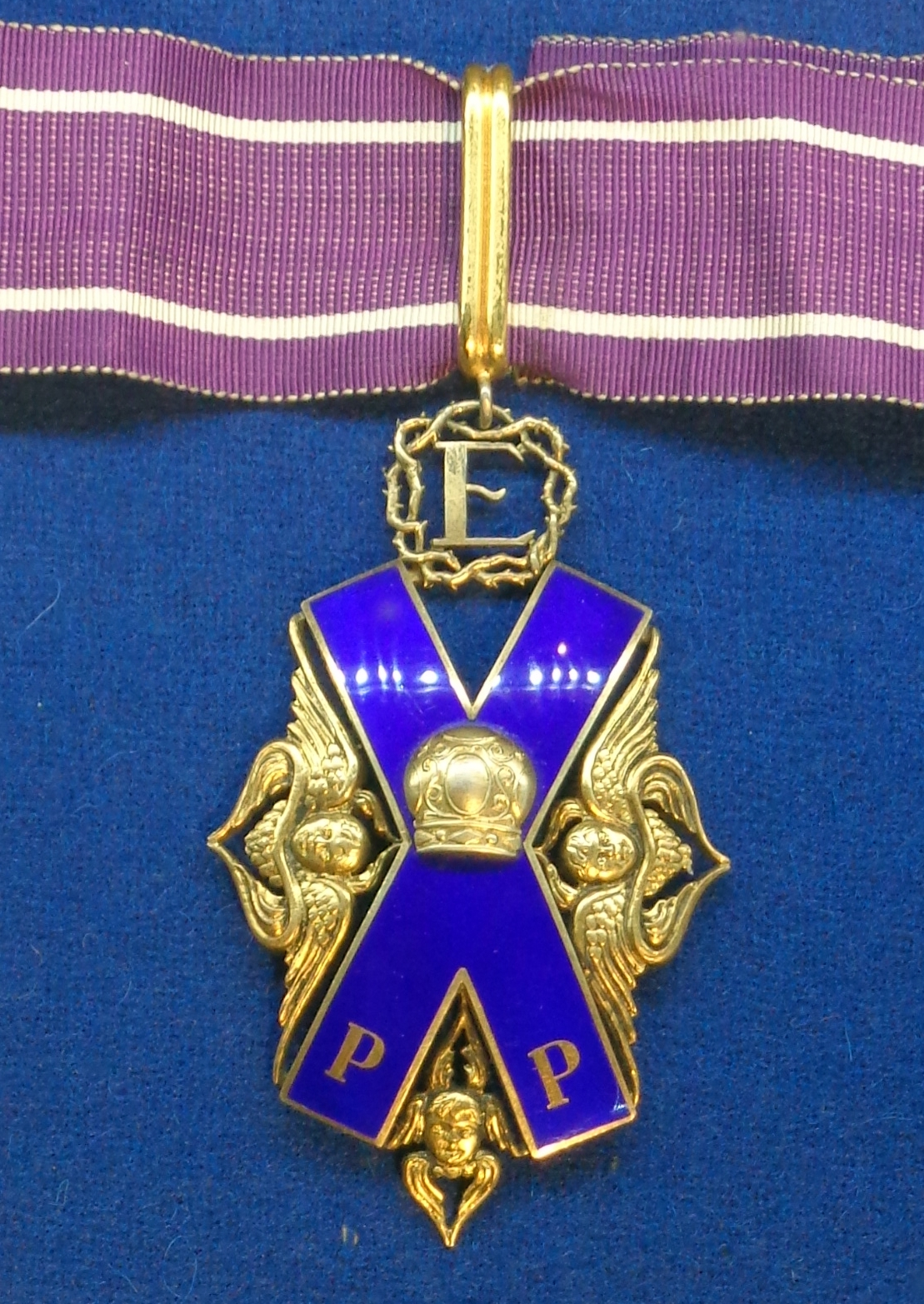
The Order of Bishop Platon (2nd class)

The Order of Bishop Platon (Estonian: Püha Piiskop Platoni orden) is an Estonian award given by Estonian Apostolic Orthodox Church. The award is named after the Estonian Orthodox saint Bishop Platon (Kulbusch). The award was established in 1922. It comprises three classes.

== Recipients (selection) ==
- Konstantin Päts
- Herman (Aav)
- Andrei Jämsä
- Endel Lippmaa
- Indrek Pertelson

== See also ==
- List of ecclesiastical decorations
