= List of Estonian flags =

Flag of Estonia

The national flag of Estonia is a tricolour featuring three equal horizontal bands of blue (top), black (middle), and white (bottom). The proportion of the flag is 7:11, with a nominal size of 105 × 165 cm. In Estonian it is called the "sinimustvalge" (literally "blue-black-white"), after the colours of the bands.

The flag became associated with Estonian nationalism in the beginning of the 20th century and was used as the national flag (riigilipp) when the Estonian Declaration of Independence was issued on 24 February 1918. The flag was formally adopted on 21 November 1918, and on 12 December of the same year, the flag was raised for the first time as the national symbol atop of the Pikk Hermann tower in Tallinn. Starting in 1940, the flag and its colours were banned in Soviet-occupied Estonia, until the flag was restored to the top of Pikk Hermann on 24 February 1989 and reinstated as the state flag on 7 August 1990.

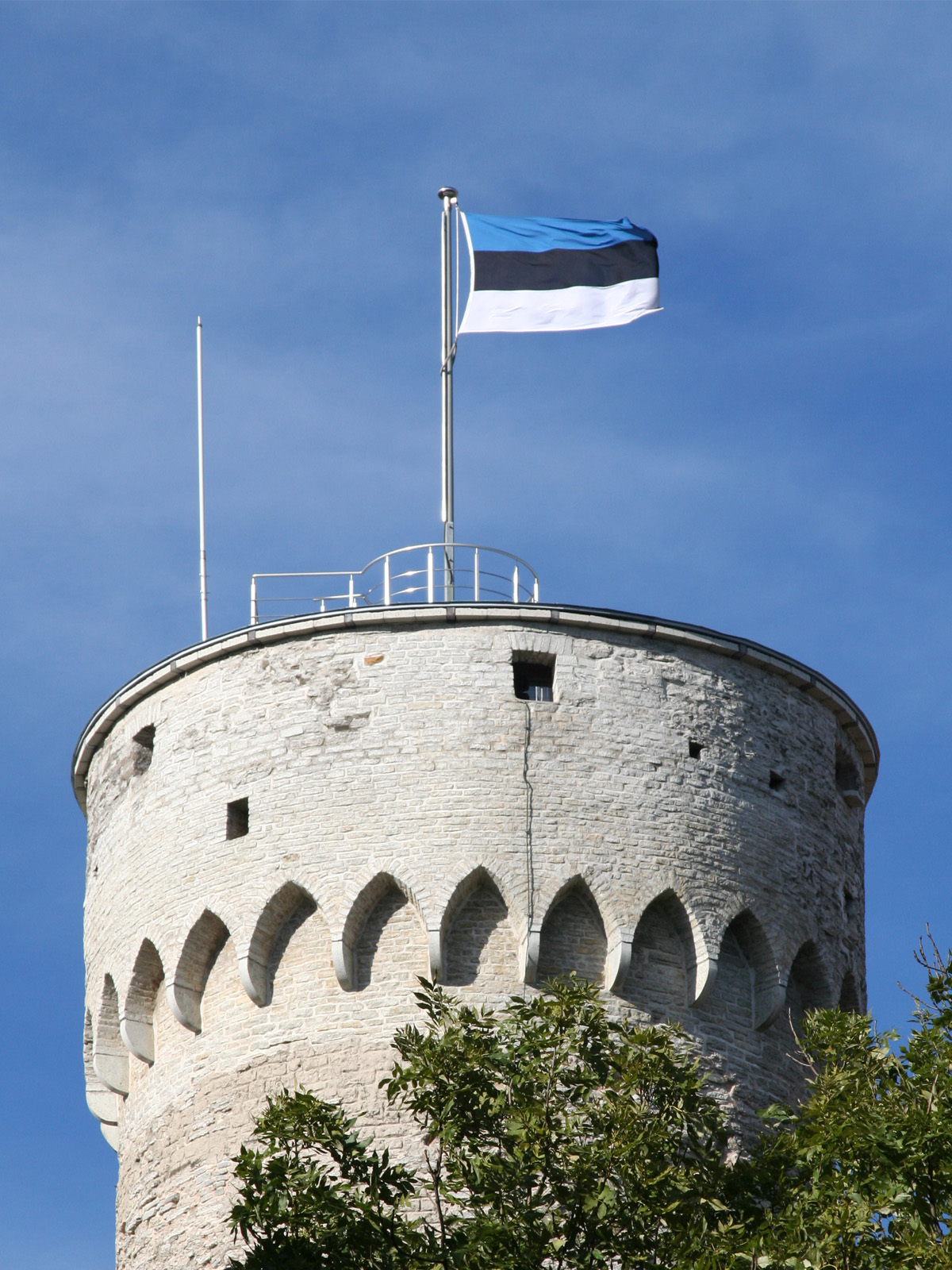
The flag of Estonia waving above the Pikk Hermann tower of Toompea Castle in Tallinn.

The following is a list of flags associated with Estonia.

== National flag ==
Flag	Date	Use	Description	Notes
	Since 1990; 1918–1940 (Note: First adopted on 21 November 1918. Banned by the Stalinist regime during World War II, soon after the invasion and occupation of Estonia in June 1940.)	National flag, Civil flag, Civil ensign	A horizontal tricolour of blue, black, and white Proportion = 7:11	
	Since 1990; 1918–1940	Flag of Estonia (vertical)	When displayed vertically, the blue band should appear on the left when viewed by an observer Proportion = 11:7	

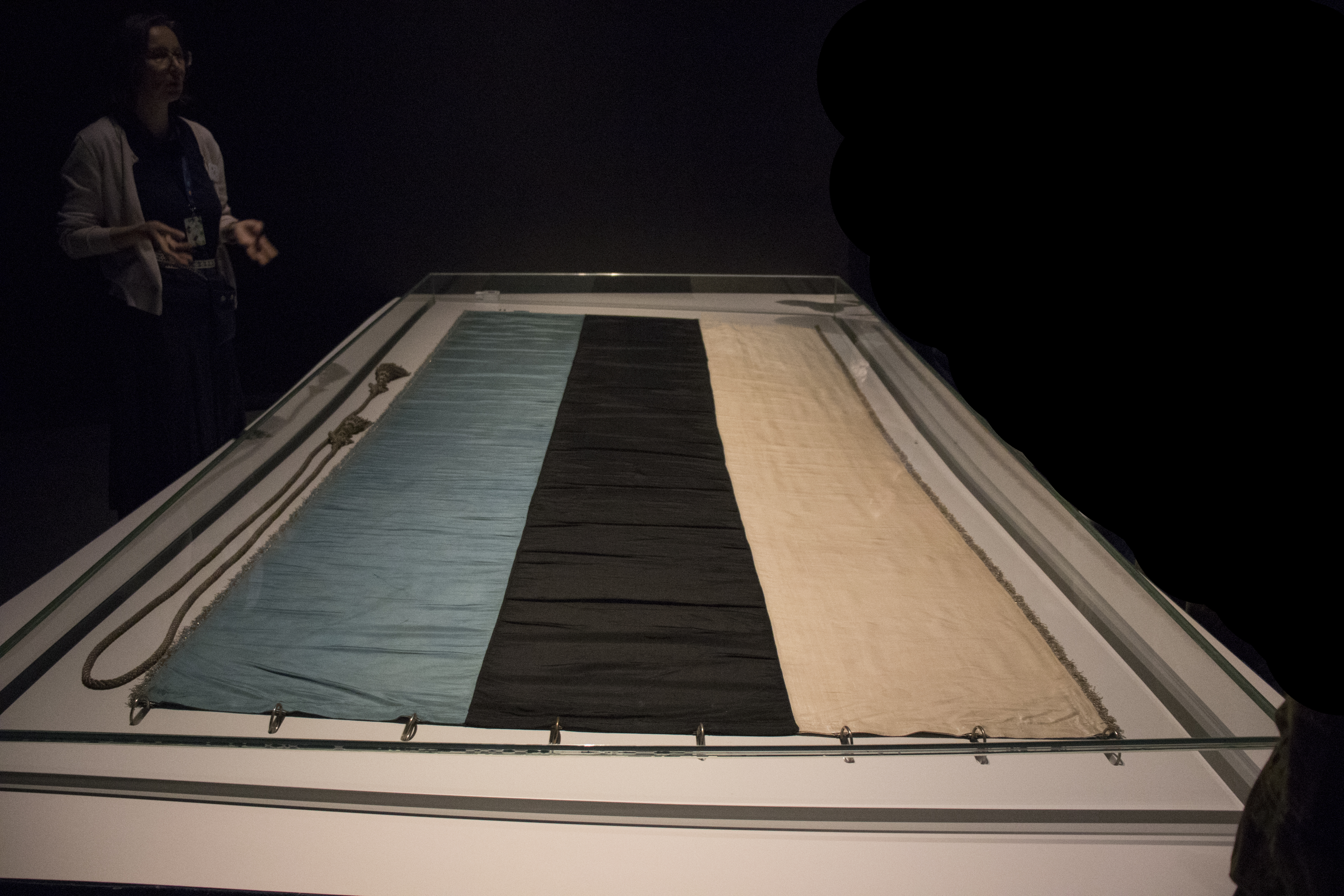
The first ever Estonian flag, made in 1884 (on display in the Estonian National Museum, 2018)

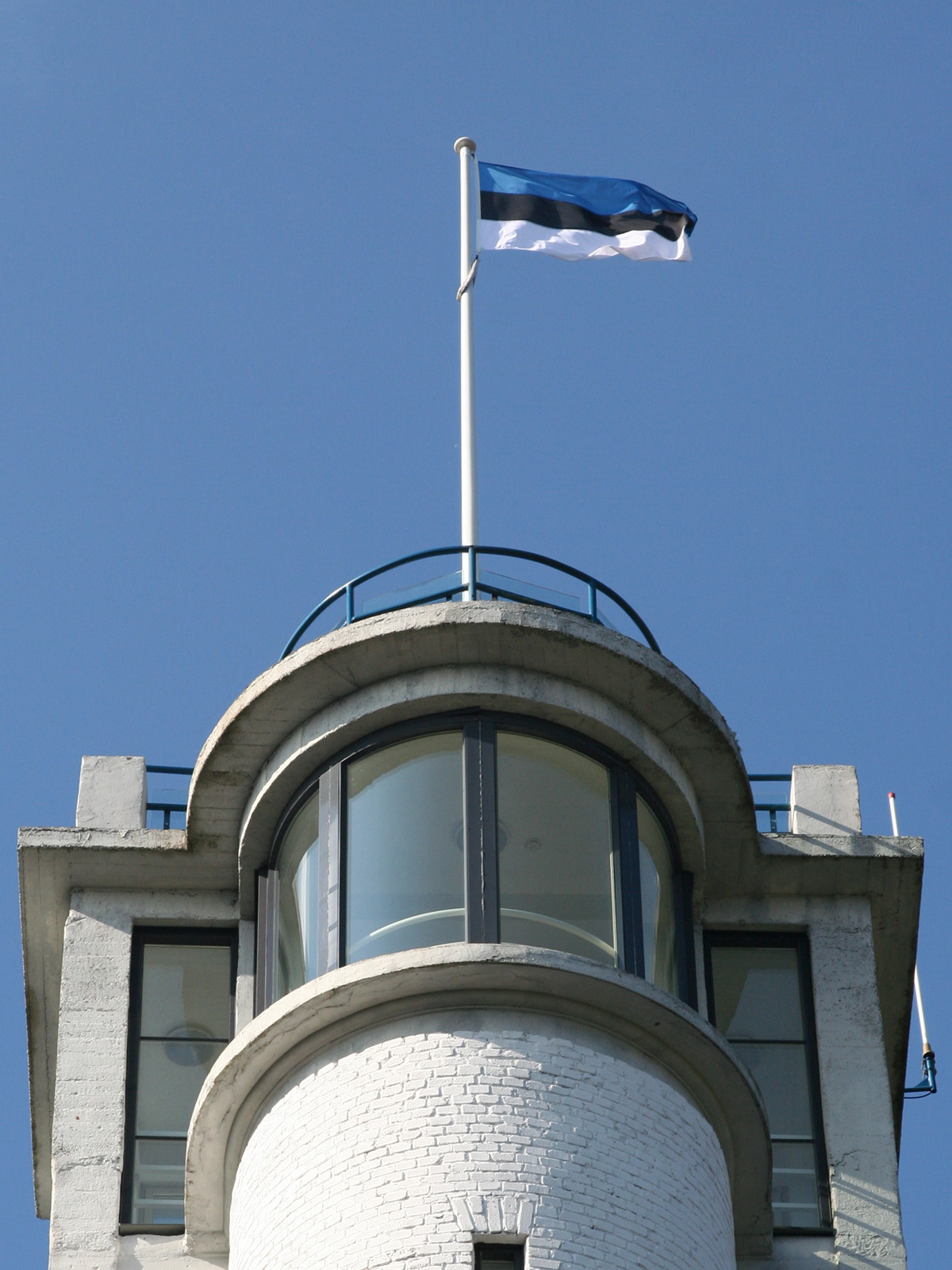
National flag on top of Suur Munamägi (the highest point in Estonia, at 318 metres (1,043 ft) above sea level; photo 2007)

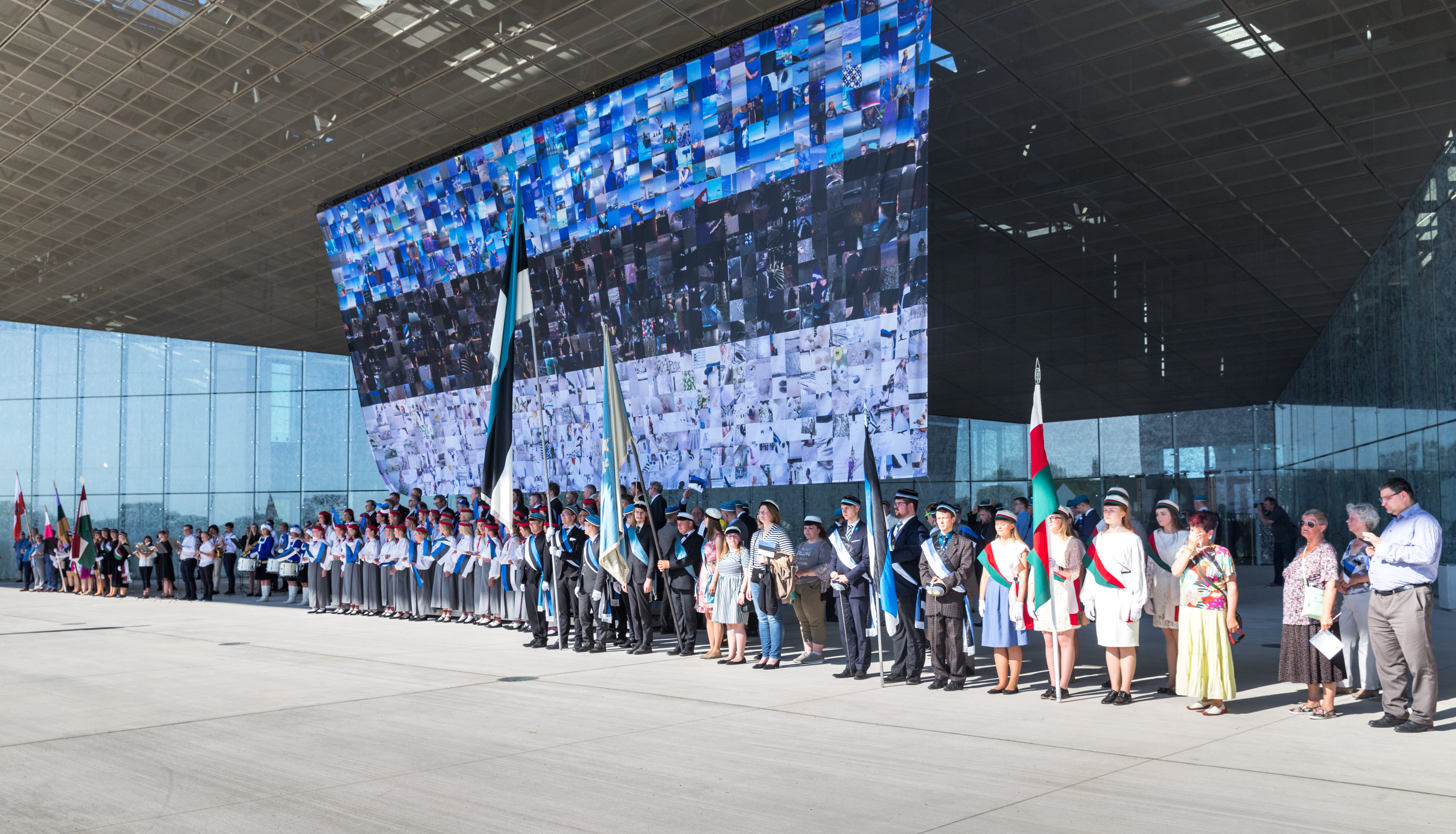
Celebration of the 135th anniversary of the Estonian flag (2019)

== Standards ==
=== Head of state ===
Flag	Date	Use	Description	Notes
	Since 1993	Flag of the President of the Republic	National tricolour with the greater coat of arms in the centre	
	1922–1940	Flag of the State Elder	National tricolour with the greater coat of arms in the centre	

=== Ministers ===
Flag	Date	Use	Description	Notes
	Since 2005	Flag of the Minister of Defence	National tricolour with the lesser coat of arms offset to hoist	
	1927–1940	Flag of the Minister of War	National tricolour with the lesser coat of arms offset to hoist	

== Military flags ==
Flag	Date	Use	Description	Notes
	Since 2003	Flag of the Estonian Defense Forces	Coat of arms of Estonia in banner form	
	Since 1994; 1927–1940	Flag of the Commander of the Defence Forces	Blue and white swallowtail with the lesser coat of arms offset to hoist, and yellow horizontal bands at the top and bottom	
	1927–1940	Flag of the Lieutenant General	Similar to the flag of the Commander of the Defence Forces, but with yellow band only along the top	
	1927–1940	Flag of the Major General	Similar to the flag of the Commander of the Defence Forces, but with yellow band only along the bottom	
	Since 2012	Flag of the Estonian Special Operations Force	A black field with a white rhombus, fly side corner open, and a horizontal white sword	

=== Army ===
Flag	Date	Use	Description	Notes
	Since 2005	Flag of the Estonian Land Forces	A black field with a vertical silver sword, in front of it a crenellated golden beam with three blue lions	

=== Navy ===
Flag	Date	Use	Description	Notes
	Since 1994; 1927–1940	Naval ensign of the Estonian Navy	Swallow-tailed national tricolour with the lesser coat of arms off-set towards hoist Proportion = 7:13	
	Since 2008; 1927–1940	Naval jack	White field with a black saltire and blue cross	
	Since 2018	Flag of the Vice Admiral	Same as the flag of the Lieutenant General	
	Since 2018	Flag of the Counter Admiral	Same as the flag of the Major General	
	1927–1940	Flag of the Counter Admiral	Similar to the current flag of the Counter Admiral, but without any yellow bands	
	Since 2018	Flag of the Commodore	Similar to the current flag of the Counter Admiral, but without any yellow bands	
	Since 2008; 1927–1940	Pennant of the Commander of the Navy	White swallow-tailed pennant with a blue chevron issuing from the hoist and a yellow anchor near the hoist	
	Since 2008; 1927–1940	Pennant of a Commander of Division	Same as the pennant of the Commander of the Navy, but without the anchor	
	1927–1940	Senior officer afloat pennant	White triangular pennant with a horizontal blue band in the middle	
	Since 2008; 1927–1940	Pennant of a warship commander	White streamer with the national tricolour at hoist	
	?	Presidential pennant	White swallow-tailed streamer with the greater coat of arms at hoist	
	1923–1940	Pennant of the State Elder	White swallow-tailed streamer with the greater coat of arms at hoist	

=== Air Force ===
Flag	Date	Use	Description	Notes
	Since 1996	Flag of the Estonian Air Force	Emblem of the Air Force on a white field, with the word "ÕHUVÄGI" above it	

=== Defence League ===
Flag	Date	Use	Description	Notes
	Since 1999; 1925–1940	Flag of the Defence League	The emblem of the Defence League (a silver eagle holding a silver sword and the lesser coat of arms) on a yellow field	

== Government flags ==
Flag	Date	Use	Description	Notes
	Since 2012	Flag of the Police and Border Guard Board	A white lion rampant on a blue field, holding the lesser coat of arms	
	Since 2000	Flag of the Internal Security Service	A golden griffin segreant on a blue field, holding the lesser coat of arms. Above it is the motto "Virtute et constantia" and below the year "1993".	
	1996–2009; 1923–1940	Flag of the Border Guard	National tricolour with a yellow and green pile issuing from the hoist, defaced with the letters "PV" (for "Piirivalve")	
	1996–2009; 1923–1940	Pennant of the Minister of the Interior	White swallow-tailed pennant with a yellow and green pile issuing from the hoist	
	1996–2009; 1923–1940	Pennant of the Director General of the Border Guard	White triangular pennant with a yellow and green pile issuing from the hoist	
	Since 2004	Customs flag	National tricolour with a white square in the top canton, containing a black caduceus	
	1994–2004; 1923–1940	Customs flag	National tricolour with a red square in the top canton, containing a white letter "T" and a black caduceus	

== Sporting flags ==
Flag	Date	Use	Description
		Flag of Estonian Olympic Committee	A white flag with the logo of Estonian Olympic Committee in the middle.

== Postal flag ==
Flag	Date	Use	Description	Notes
	1994–2009; 1923–1940	Postal flag	National tricolour defaced with a post horn	

== Subdivisions flags ==
=== County flags ===
The design of the flags of counties of Estonia was officially approved on 7 August 1939, by then President, Konstantin Päts, as Decision of the President of the Republic No. 174. The standard size of the flag was set at 110 x 220 centimeters, which is a proportion of 1:2.

Maakonna lipuks on valge-roheline lipp, mille erivärvide laiud on ühelaiused. Lipu laiuse ja pikkuse suhe on 1:2 ja lipu normaalsuurus 110 X 220 sentimeetrit. Lipu valge laiu keskosas asetseb maakondliku eritunnusena vastava maakonna vapp, mille kõrgus normaalsuurusega lipul on 42 sentimeetrit.[27][b]

Flag	Administrative division	Date	Description
	Harju	Since 1939	Horizontal bicolor of two equally-sized bands of white (top) and green (bottom), emblazoned with the coat of arms of the respective county in the center of the white band. Proportion = 1:2
	Hiiu	Since 1996	Horizontal bicolor of two equally-sized bands of white (top) and green (bottom), emblazoned with the coat of arms of the respective county in the center of the white band. Proportion = 1:2
	Ida-Viru	Since 1997	Horizontal bicolor of two equally-sized bands of white (top) and green (bottom), emblazoned with the coat of arms of the respective county in the center of the white band. Proportion = 1:2
	Jõgeva	Since 1996	Horizontal bicolor of two equally-sized bands of white (top) and green (bottom), emblazoned with the coat of arms of the respective county in the center of the white band. Proportion = 1:2
	Järva	Since 1939	Horizontal bicolor of two equally-sized bands of white (top) and green (bottom), emblazoned with the coat of arms of the respective county in the center of the white band. Proportion = 1:2
	Lääne	Since 1939	Horizontal bicolor of two equally-sized bands of white (top) and green (bottom), emblazoned with the coat of arms of the respective county in the center of the white band. Proportion = 1:2
	Lääne-Viru	Since 1996	Horizontal bicolor of two equally-sized bands of white (top) and green (bottom), emblazoned with the coat of arms of the respective county in the center of the white band. Proportion = 1:2
	Põlva	Since 1996	Horizontal bicolor of two equally-sized bands of white (top) and green (bottom), emblazoned with the coat of arms of the respective county in the center of the white band. Proportion = 1:2
	Pärnu	Since 1939	Horizontal bicolor of two equally-sized bands of white (top) and green (bottom), emblazoned with the coat of arms of the respective county in the center of the white band. Proportion = 1:2
	Rapla	Since 1996	Horizontal bicolor of two equally-sized bands of white (top) and green (bottom), emblazoned with the coat of arms of the respective county in the center of the white band. Proportion = 1:2
	Saare	Since 1939	Horizontal bicolor of two equally-sized bands of white (top) and green (bottom), emblazoned with the coat of arms of the respective county in the center of the white band. Proportion = 1:2
	Tartu	Since 1939	Horizontal bicolor of two equally-sized bands of white (top) and green (bottom), emblazoned with the coat of arms of the respective county in the center of the white band. Proportion = 1:2
	Valga	Since 1939	Horizontal bicolor of two equally-sized bands of white (top) and green (bottom), emblazoned with the coat of arms of the respective county in the center of the white band. Proportion = 1:2
	Viljandi	Since 1939	Horizontal bicolor of two equally-sized bands of white (top) and green (bottom), emblazoned with the coat of arms of the respective county in the center of the white band. Proportion = 1:2
	Võru	Since 1939	Horizontal bicolor of two equally-sized bands of white (top) and green (bottom), emblazoned with the coat of arms of the respective county in the center of the white band. Proportion = 1:2

==== Historical ====
Petseri County (1939–1940)

=== Municipal flags ===
Flag	Municipality		Adopted	Description
		Alutaguse		
		Anija		
	|	Antsla		
		Elva		
		Häädemeeste		
		Haapsalu		
		Haljala		
		Harku		
		Hiiumaa		
		Järva		
		Jõelähtme		
		Jõgeva		
		Jõhvi		
		Kadrina		
		Kambja		
		Kanepi		
		Kastre		
		Kehtna		
		Keila		
		Kihnu		
		Kiili		
		Kohila		
		Kohtla-Järve		
		Kose		
		Kuusalu		
		Lääne-Harju		
		Lääne-Nigula		
		Lääneranna		
		Loksa		
		Lüganuse		
		Luunja		
		Maardu		
		Märjamaa		
		Muhu		
		Mulgi		
		Mustvee		
		Narva		
		Narva-Jõesuu		
		Nõo		
		Otepää		
		Paide		
		Pärnu		
		Peipsiääre		
		Põhja-Pärnumaa		
		Põhja-Sakala		
		Põltsamaa		
		Põlva		
		Raasiku		
		Rae		
		Rakvere (parish)		
		Rakvere (town)		
		Räpina		
		Rapla		
		Rõuge		
		Ruhnu		
		Saarde		
		Saaremaa		
		Saku		
		Saue		
		Setomaa		Baltic pick-up pattern arranged in a Nordic cross on a white field.
		Sillamäe		
		Tallinn	13th century	Six horizontal alternating blue and white bars. Proportion = 2:1
		Tapa		
		Tartu (parish)		
		Tartu (city)		
		Tori		
		Tõrva		
		Türi		
		Väike-Maarja		
		Valga		
		Viimsi		
		Viljandi (parish)		
		Viljandi (town)		
		Vinni		
		Viru-Nigula		
		Vormsi		
		Võru (parish)		
		Võru (town)		

== Political flags ==
Flag	Date	Party
	Since 2022	Parempoolsed
	Since 2018	Estonia 200; Eesti 200
	Since 2006	Isamaa
	Since 1994	Estonian Reform Party; Eesti Reformierakond
	Since 1991	Estonian Centre Party; Eesti Keskerakond
	Since 1990	Social Democratic Party; Sotsiaaldemokraatlik Erakond

== Flags of ethnic groups ==
Flag	Date	Use	Description	Notes
	Since 2003	Flag of Setos	Baltic pick-up pattern arranged in a Nordic cross on a white field	
	Since 2002	Flag of Votians	Blue flag with a white pile issuing from the top, charged with a red cross	
	Since 2013	Flag of Võros	White regular octagram on a dark green field	
	Since 2013	Flag of Mulks	Blue field with a black side, separated by a red looped lucet cord with a white outline	
	Since 1996	Flag of Noarootsi Parish		(Note: Most of the remaining Estonian Swedes in Estonia live in this parish and this flag reflects the Swedish heritage of the region.)

== Historical flags ==
Flag	Date	Use	Description
	1953–1990	Flag of the Estonian Soviet Socialist Republic	Red flag with a golden hammer and sickle and outlined star above them in the top hoist corner. A band of blue and white water waves in the lower half. It lacked the hammer and sickle on its reverse side.
	1940–1953	Flag of the Estonian Soviet Socialist Republic	Red flag with a golden hammer and sickle in the top hoist corner and "ENSV" (Eesti Nõukogude Sotsialistlik Vabariik) written above the hammer and sickle.
	1941–1944	Flag of German Reich	Red field with a white disc with a black swastika at a 45-degree angle. The swastika disk is slightly off-centre.
Flag of the Estonian Workers' Commune (1918-1919)	1918–1919 (50 days)	Flag of the Estonian Workers' Commune	A red flag with a golden canton. Inside the canton, the texts meaning "Estonian Workers' Commune", separated by a red line: Estonian: "Eesti Töörahva Kommuun"; Russian: "Эстляндская трудовая коммуна" ("Estlyandskaya Trudovaya Kommuna"). On the red field there are also white Russian inscriptions "НА БАРИКАДЫ ЭСТОНСКИЙ ПРОЛЕТАРИАТ" "ЗА СОВЕТСКУЮ ЭСТЛЯНДИЮ, ВЕЛИКУЮ ВОЛГУ, УРАЛ, СИБИРЬ ВО ИМЯ III КОММУНИСТИЧЕСКАГО ИНТЕРНАЦИОНАЛА" ("NA BARIKADY ESTONSKIY PROLETARIAT" "ZA SOVETSKUYU ESTLYANDIYU, VELIKUYU VOLGU, URAL, SIBIR' VO IMYA III KOMMUNISTICHESKAGO INTERNATSIONALA"), which means "On the barricades is the Estonian proletariat. For Soviet Estonia, greater Volga, Ural and Siberia, in the name of the third Communist International".
	1918	Flag of German Empire	Horizontal black-white-red tricolour.
	1896–1917	Flag of Russian Empire	Horizontal white-blue-red tricolour.
	1858–1896	Flag of Russian Empire	Horizontal black-yellow-white tricolour.
	1650–1721	Flag of the Duchy of Estonia under Sweden	
	1561–1650	Flag of the Duchy of Estonia under Sweden	
	1570–1579	Flag of the Kingdom of Livonia	
	1587–1629	Flag of The Polish–Lithuanian Commonwealth	Version with additional arms of the House of Wasa.
	1569–1587	Flag of The Kingdom of Poland and the Grand Duchy of Lithuania	Tailed red-white-red triband with the coat of arms in the middle.
	1559–1645	Flag of the Duchy of Estonia under Denmark–Norway	
	1237–1561	Flag of the State of the Teutonic Order	White flag with a black cross.
	1300–1346	Flag of the Duchy of Estonia under The Kingdom of Denmark	

== Proposed flags ==
Flag	Date	Description
		Proposed Nordic cross flag
	1919	Proposed cross flag

== See also ==
- Flag of Estonia
- National symbols of Estonia
