= Pootsi =

Village in Estonia

- village
- Location in Estonia
- Coordinates: 58°16′12″N 24°07′22″E
- Country: Estonia
- County: Pärnu County
- Municipality: Pärnu

Population (01.01.2011)
  - Total: 79

Pootsi (German: Podis) is a village in Pärnu, Pärnu County, in southwestern Estonia. It has a population of 79 (as of 1 January 2011).

== Notable people ==
- Platon (1869–1919, Paul Kulbusch), Orthodox bishop and saint

== Gallery ==
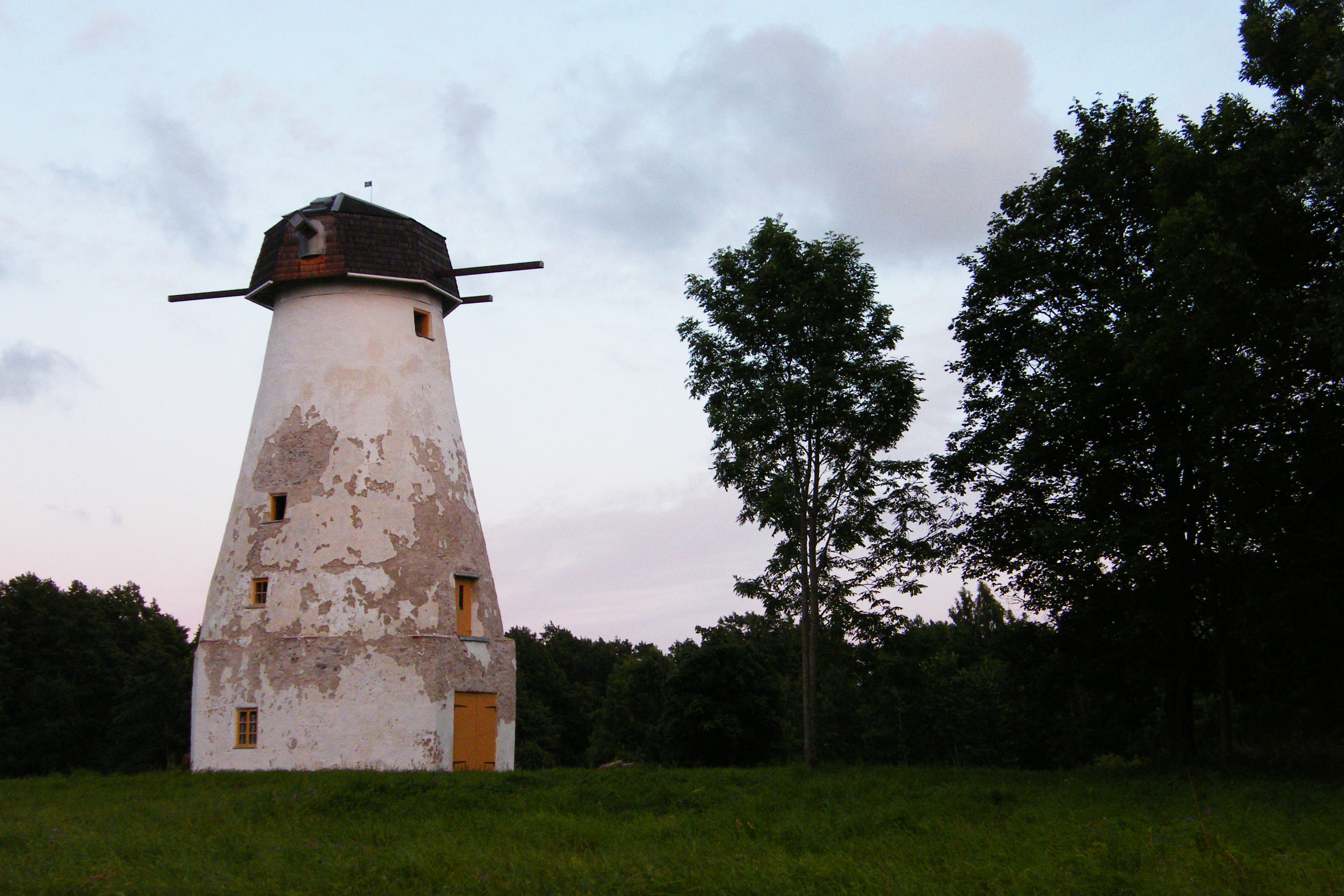
Pootsi windmill

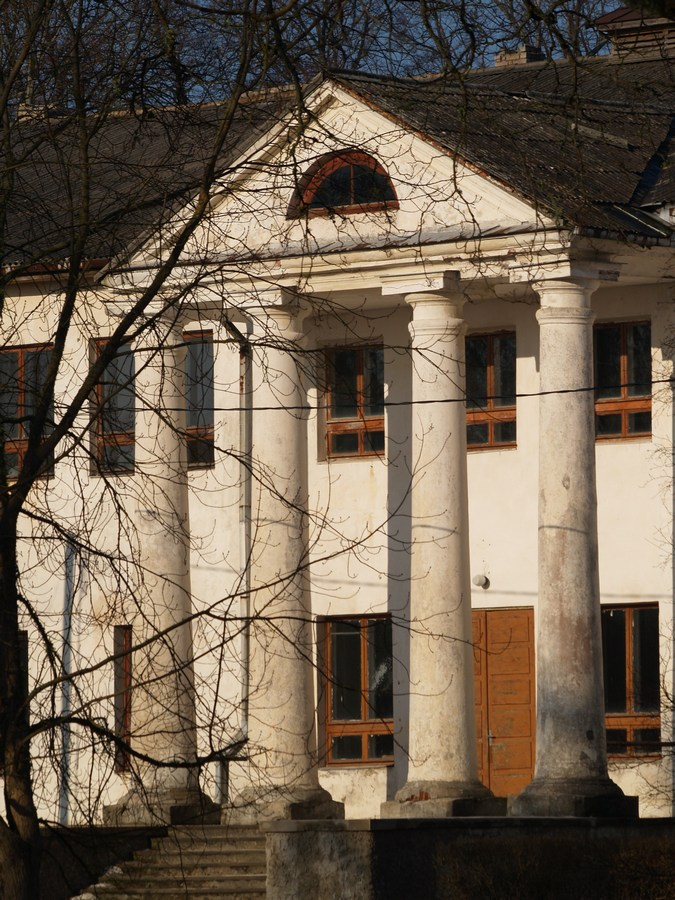
Pootsi Manor

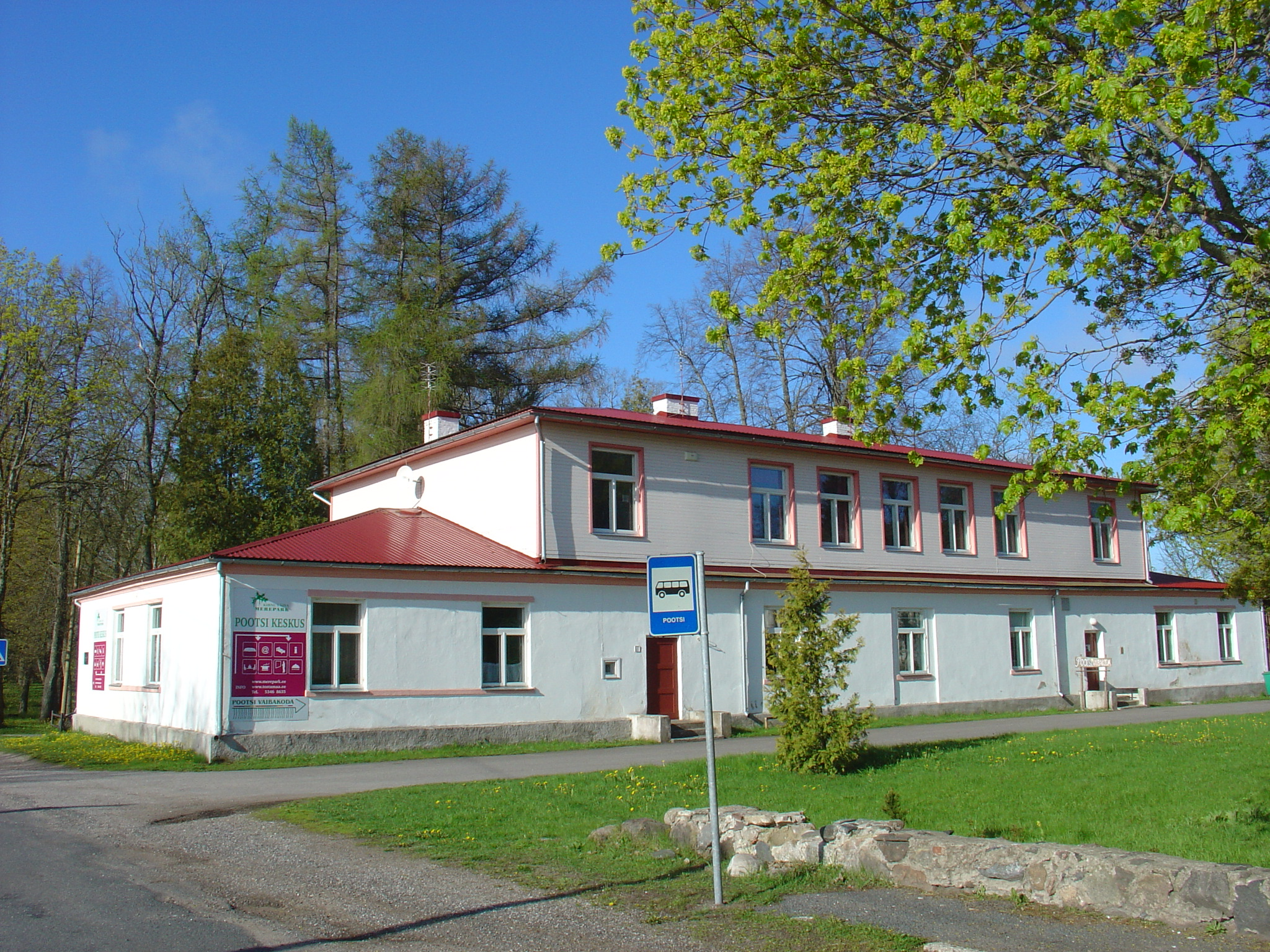
Pootsi centre

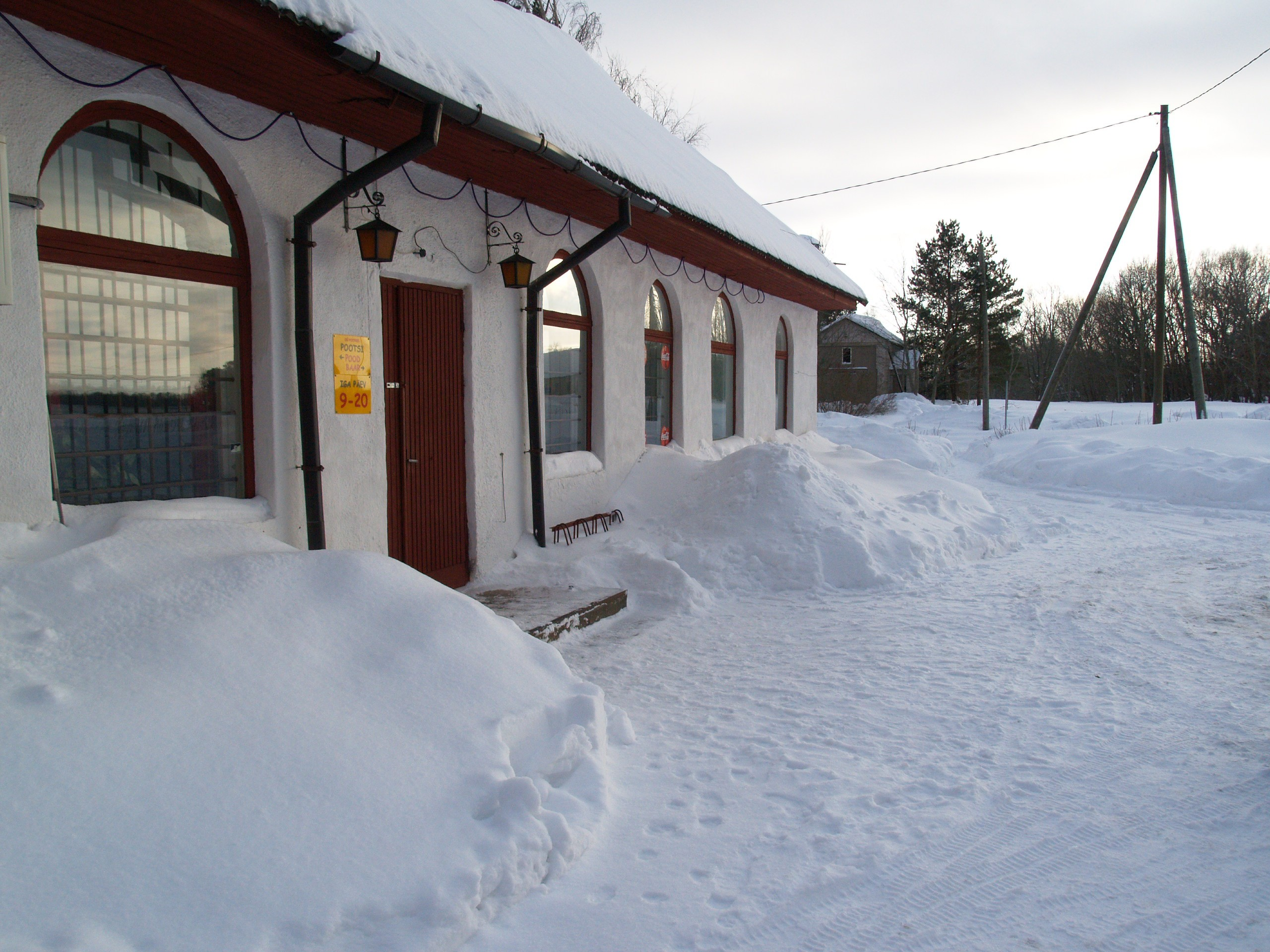
Pootsi store
