= Platon Kulbusch =

Estonian bishop

Saint Platon

Platon, born Paul Kulbusch (also spelled Kuhlbusch or Kuldbush; 25 July [O.S. 13 July] 1869 – 14 January 1919), was an Estonian bishop and the first Orthodox saint of Estonian ethnicity.

== History ==
Paul Kulbusch was born on 25 July [O.S. 13 July] 1869 in Pootsi, Pärnumaa, in the southwest of present-day Estonia (then part of Imperial Russia). Kulbusch graduated in 1894 from the St. Petersburg Theological Academy with a master's degree and soon became a priest at the Estonian Orthodox Church of Saint Isidore in St. Petersburg, where he oversaw the expansion of church institutions and buildings and actively reached out to the Anglican church.

In 1917 a plenary council in Riga elected Kulbusch to be bishop of Reval (modern Tallinn, then a vicariate of the Riga diocese). He was consecrated as Bishop Platon on 31 December 1917. It was a tumultuous time. World War I was raging on, Russia's emperor Nicholas II had been overthrown, and Estonia yearned for independence, which Platon staunchly supported. Under the threat of German invasion, Russian troops withdrew from Estonia, enabling the declaration of Estonian independence on 24 February 1918, only to be ended by German occupation days later. During the occupation, Platon traveled extensively through Estonia, visiting parishes by horse.

Following the German Revolution, in November 1918 Germany formally handed over political power to the Estonian national government. In response, Bolshevik Russia invaded, attempting to regain control over the territory. At this time, Platon was in Tartu (Dorpat), having fallen ill with pneumonia. The Bolsheviks took Tartu on 24 December, and on 2 January Platon was arrested and imprisoned in a cellar. On 14 January 1919, during the Tartu Credit Center Massacre, Platon was executed along with two other priests, Michael Bleive and Nikolai Bezhanitsky, just before the city was retaken by the Estonian Army.

Platon and the two murdered priests were canonised as martyrs by the Russian Orthodox Church Outside Russia in 1982, 12 August 2000 by Russian Orthodox Church and by the Patriarchate of Constantinople on 15 September 2000.

== See also ==
- Order of Bishop Platon
