= Infanterie-Regiment Nr. 405 =

Military unit

Infanterie-Regiment Nr. 405 was a war-time formation in the German Imperial Army during the First World War.

It was created late 1916 and was attached to the 405. Infanterie-Brigade of the 203. Infanterie-Division. It defended the Narva town against the Gdov and Yamburg Detachments of the 7th Red Army on the north wing of the Soviet westward offensive of 1918–1919 on 22 November 1918. Thereafter on 28 November 1918, the 6th Red Rifle Division attacked units of the Estonian Defence League (partly consisting of secondary school pupils) and the German Infanterie-Regiment Nr. 405 again marking the beginning of the Estonian War of Independence. The red rifle division captured the city on 29 November. The Infanterie-Regiment Nr. 405 thereafter withdrew westwards.

== See also ==
- List of Imperial German infantry regiments
