= Commune of the Working People of Estonia =

Bolshevik government in Estonia

Estonian Workers' Commune Eesti Töörahva Kommuuna
- 1918–1919
- Flag

- Location of Estonia.
- Status: State of Russian SFSR (until December 7th, 1918)
- Capital: Narva
- Common languages: Estonian; Russian
- Government: Soviet republic
- Chairman^{a}
  - 1918–1919: Jaan Anvelt
- Legislature: Soviet council
- History
  - Established: 29 November 1918
  - Disestablished: 5 June 1919
- 1. Chairman (Esimees) of the Soviet of the Commune of the Working People of Estonia (Eesti Töörahva Kommuuni Nõukogu).

The Estonian Workers' Commune (Estonian: Eesti Töörahva Kommuun, initially Eesti Töörahwa Kommuuna; Russian: Эстляндская трудовая коммуна Estlyandskaya trudovaya kommuna, ЭТК or ETK, also Estonian Labour Commune and Commune of the Working People of Estonia) was a government claiming the Bolshevik-occupied parts of Republic of Estonia as its territories during the Estonian War of Independence and the Russian Civil War. It was recognised as an independent state only by the Russian SFSR, on December 7th, 1918.

Another version of flag of the Commune of the Working People of Estonia

== Establishment and fall ==
The Commune was established in Narva on 29 November 1918 with the support of the Red Army. It was chaired by Jaan Anvelt for the duration of its existence. Within areas of their control, the Commune closed churches, nationalised industry and the banks and outlawed representatives of the Provisional Government.

The Communist offensive was initially successful and eventually reached as far as 34 kilometres from Tallinn. However, a counter-offensive begun on 7 January 1919 by the Estonian People's Force (Rahvavägi) under Commander-in-Chief Johan Laidoner eventually drove the Red Army out of Estonia, with international military aid primarily from the British Empire. The Commune was thus rendered defunct, claiming a government in exile in Pskov, then Luga and finally, from 17 May 1919, in Staraya Russa.

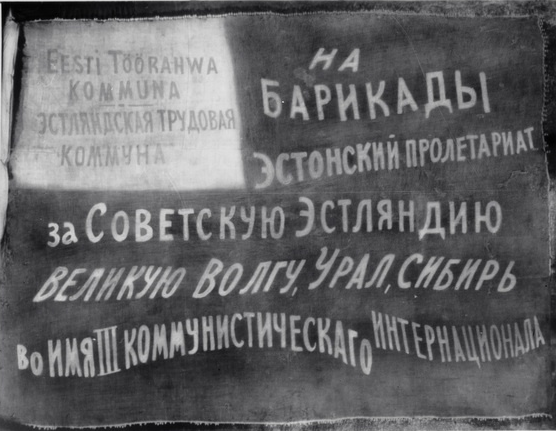
Flag

== International recognition ==
The Russian Socialist Federative Soviet Republic (RSFSR) formally recognised the ETK on 7 December 1918 and remained the only government to do so. At that time, Soviet Russia was itself not internationally recognised. One of the first international treaties recognising Russia's Soviet government as legitimate was the Treaty of Tartu concluding the Estonian War of Independence in 1920.

== Massacres ==
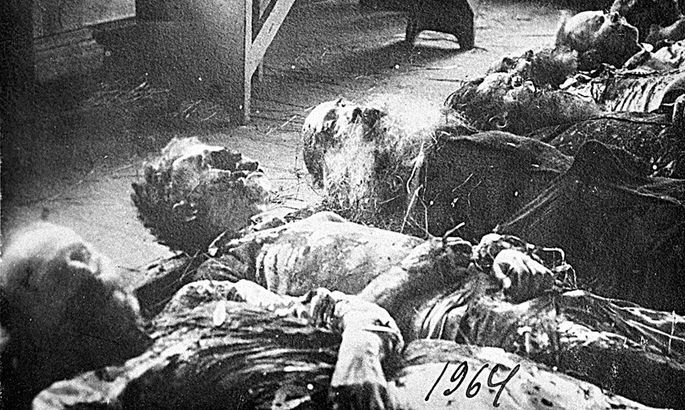
Corpses of victims of the 1919 Tartu Credit Center Massacre, among them Estonian bishop Platon, killed by the withdrawing Bolsheviks

The regime instituted a reign of terror from November 1918 to January 1919. A considerable number of people were arrested in Tartu in December 1918 and a number of German estate owners were executed on the frozen river on 9 January 1919. A concentration camp was also set up near Luga, in January 1919. Just before Tartu was seized, the Bolsheviks carried out the Tartu Credit Center Massacre executing clergymen and other prisoners in the basement of the town's bank, among the victims were Bishop Platon, the priest Sergei Florinski and the pastor Traugott Hahn. Around 500 people were killed in total.

== Members of the Commune ==
- Jaan Anvelt – Chairman of the council and People's Commissar of Defence
- Viktor Kingissepp – People's Commissar of the Interior (actually underground in Estonia, Johannes Käspert acting for him)
- Hans Pöögelmann – Commissioner for the National Economy
- Artur Vallner – People's Commissar of Culture and Public Education
- Johannes Mägi – People's Commissar of Foreign Affairs (from 20 December 1918 Max-Alfred Trakmann) and state control (later Karl Mühlberg)
- Rudolf Vakman – Commissioner for Social Insurance (acting Otto Rästas)
- Johannes Käspert – Executive Secretary of the council

Soviet authorities executed most of the members during the Great Purge.

== See also ==
- Estonian Soviet Socialist Republic
- Soviet Republic of Naissaar
- Estonian War of Independence
- Latvian Socialist Soviet Republic
- Finnish Socialist Workers' Republic
- Finnish Democratic Republic

== Sources ==
- Szajkowski, Bogdan. The Establishment of Marxist Regimes. London: Butterworths, 1982. p. 21-22. (ISBN 0-408-10834-7)
- "The Baltic States from 1914 to 1923: The First World War and the Wars of Independence" (PDF). Archived from the original (PDF) on 16 June 2007. (1.24 MiB) in Baltic Defence Review, No.8, Volume 2/2002.
