= Soviet westward offensive of 1918–1919 =

Invasion by the Russian SFSR

- Part of the Russian Civil War, Polish–Soviet War, Estonian War of Independence, Latvian War of Independence, Lithuanian Wars of Independence, and Ukrainian War of Independence
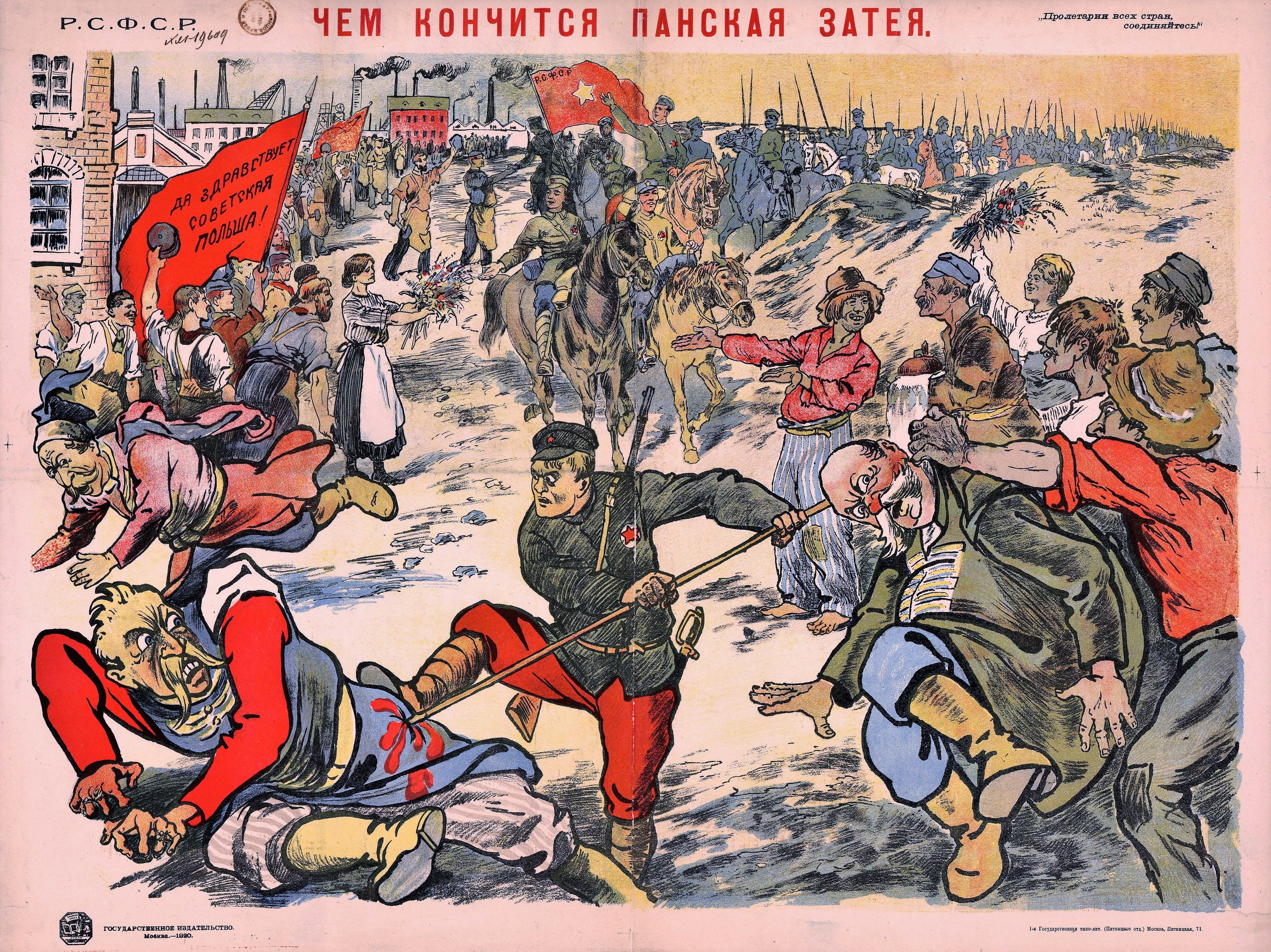
- Soviet anti-Polish propaganda poster 1920
Date	November 18, 1918 – March, 1919
Location	Belarus, Estonia, Latvia, Lithuania, Poland, Russia, Ukraine
Result	Soviet victory in Eastern Belorussia; Start of the Polish Soviet War; Soviet defeat in the Baltic states
Territorial changes	Occupation of most of Belarus by the Red Army, Bolshevik annexation of the Belarusian People's Republic and creation of the Belorussian SSR

Belligerents
Estonia; Latvia; Lithuania; Belarus (Second Polish Republic) Poland; Romania; Ukraine; Supported by: France; United Kingdom; Ober Ost; Finnish, Danish, and Swedish volunteers	Russian SFSR; Soviet Estonia; Soviet Latvia; Lithuanian-Byelorussian SSR; Provisional Polish Revolutionary Committee; Ukrainian SSR; Finnish Red Guards	White Movement

Commanders and leaders
(Latvia) Jānis Puriņš (Estonia) Johan Laidoner (Lithuania) Silvestras Žukauskas (Second Polish Republic) Józef Piłsudski; Max Hoffmann	(Russian Soviet Federative Socialist Republic) Jukums Vācietis (Russian Soviet Federative Socialist Republic) Dmitry Nadyozhny	

Strength
Total: Unknown, 70,000+ Estonia: 19,000; Poland: ~50,000	285,000	

The Soviet westward offensive of 1918–1919 was part of the campaign by Soviet Russia into areas abandoned by the Ober Ost garrisons that were being withdrawn to Germany following that country's defeat in World War I. The initially successful offensive against the Republic of Estonia ignited the Estonian War of Independence which ended with the Soviet recognition of Estonia. Similarly, the campaigns against the Republic of Latvia and Republic of Lithuania ultimately failed, resulting in the Latvian–Soviet Peace Treaty and Soviet–Lithuanian Peace Treaty respectively. In Belarus, the Belarusian People's Republic was conquered and the Socialist Soviet Republic of Byelorussia proclaimed.

The campaign eventually became bogged down, leading to the Estonian Pskov Offensive, the White Russian Petrograd Offensives, the Lithuanian–Soviet War, the Latvian War of Independence and the continuation of the Ukrainian–Soviet War.

== Soviet war aims ==
The newly formed Red Army was growing in personnel, and Vladimir Lenin could gather enough strength to replace withdrawing Western curtain forces ("Западная завеса") by solid military and re-take the lands lost by Russia in 1917 by simply following the withdrawing German army. Upon receiving the news about the German Revolution, on November 13, 1918, the Soviet government annulled the Treaty of Brest-Litovsk and issued orders to the Red Army to move in the direction of Belarus, Ukraine and the Baltic States in order to establish Soviet governments there. The newly formed (on November 16) Western Army moved at night of November 17, 1918, into the operational vacuum created by the withdrawing Imperial German Army.

== Background ==
After signing the Treaty of Brest-Litovsk, Bolshevik Russia lost the European lands the Russian Empire had annexed in the 18th and 19th centuries. Most of today's Poland, Belarus, Ukraine and the Baltic states were granted to the government of Germany, which in turn decided to grant these states limited independence as buffer states. However, the German defeat on the Western Front and the internal dissolution of Austria-Hungary made the plans for the creation of Mitteleuropa obsolete.

In November and December, the German army started a retreat westwards. Demoralised officers and mutinous soldiers abandoned their garrisons en masse and returned home. The areas abandoned by the Central Powers became a field of conflict between local puppet governments created by Germany as part of its plans, local nationalist governments that sprung up after the withdrawal of the German forces, Poland, and the Bolsheviks wanting to incorporate these areas into Soviet Russia. Belarusian, Estonian, Latvian, Lithuanian, Ukrainian and even Cossack national governments were formed. Internal power struggles prevented any of the governments in Belarus from gaining lasting power. In Ukraine the situation was even more complex, with an ongoing conflict between Nestor Makhno's anarchists, communists, the White Movement, various governments of Ukraine and the reborn Polish Army. The entire region abandoned by the German forces became a gigantic free-for-all theatre, where dozens of factions competed for power.

The Bolsheviks were also implementing a new strategy, "Revolution from abroad" (Revolutsiya izvne—literally, "revolution from the outside"), based on an assumption that revolutionary masses desire revolution but are unable to carry it out without help from more organized and advanced Bolsheviks. Hence, as Leon Trotsky remarked, the revolution should be "brought on the bayonets" (of the Red Army), as "through Kiev leads the straight route for uniting with the Austro-Hungarian revolution, just as through Pskov and Vilnius goes the way for uniting with the German revolution. Offensive on all fronts! Offensive on the west front, offensive on the south front, offensive on the all revolutionary fronts!". The concept was developed in 1918 but officially published under that name first in 1920 (Wojennaja Mysl i Riewolucija, 3/1920, Mikhail Tukhachevsky.

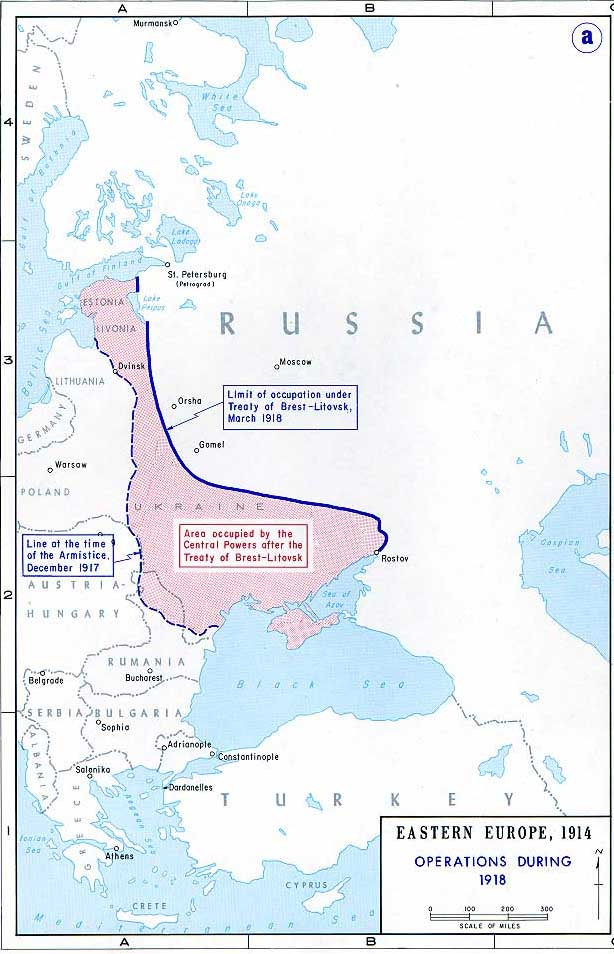
Territories occupied by Germany during 1918

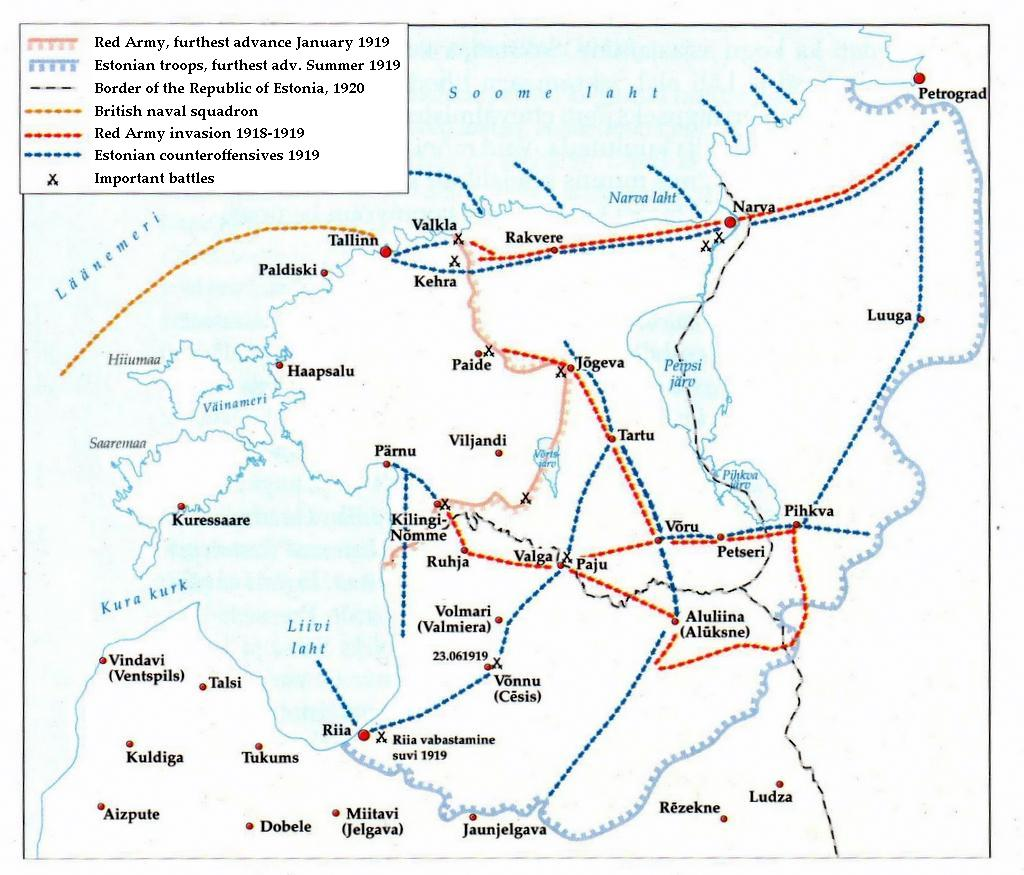
Estonian and Soviet operations in Estonia and Latvia, 1918–19

Soviet operations in Southeast Estonia, Latvia, Lithuania, and Belorussia in 1918–19

Estonian, Latvian, Lithuanian and Polish counterattacks

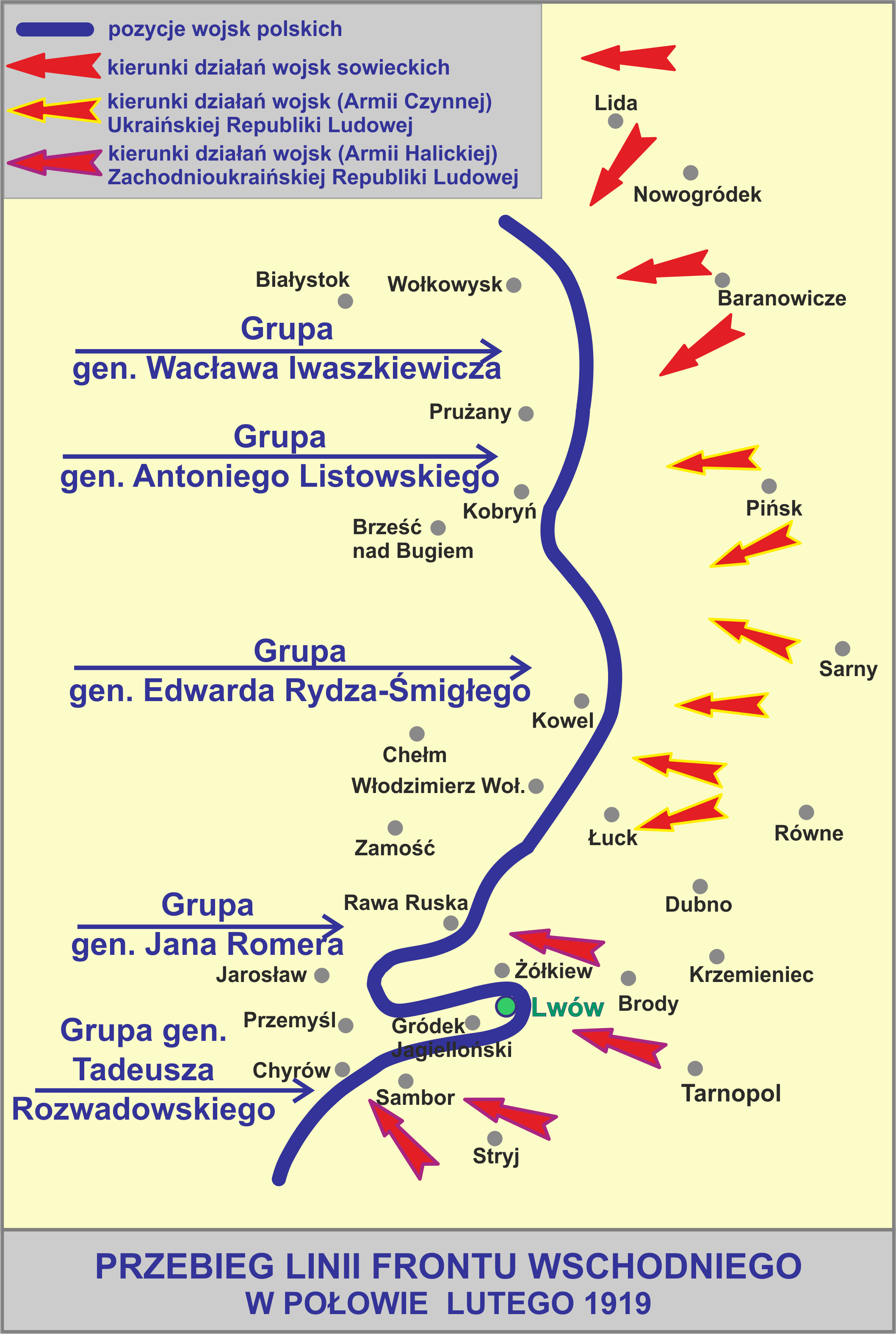
Polish-Ukrainian front and Polish-Soviet front as forming in February 1919

== Offensives ==
=== Estonian direction ===
The Gdov and Yamburg Detachments of the 7th Red Army attacked the German Infanterie-Regiment Nr. 405 defending the city of Narva on 22 November 1918. The 6th Red Division captured the railway junction of Tapa from the freshly formed 4th and 5th Regiments of the Estonian Land Forces on 24 December and advanced to 34 km (21 mi) from the capital Tallinn. On 29 November in Narva, Estonian Bolsheviks led by Jaan Anvelt proclaimed a Soviet republic — "Commune of the Working People of Estonia". In south Estonia, the 49th Red Latvian Rifle Regiment took the railway junction of Valga on 17 December and the city of Tartu on 24 December. The Estonian Army stopped the 7th Red Army's advance along the entire front on 2–5 January 1919. Two days later Estonian forces began the counteroffensive to completely expel the Soviet forces from Estonia. A Finnish volunteer marine brigade landed in the rear of the 6th Red Division, and the 1st Estonian Division captured Narva on 18 January.

Subsequently, the northeastern front stabilized along the Narva river. In south Estonia, the Estonian commando-type Tartumaa Partisan Battalion drove the Red Latvian rifle regiments out of Valga on 31 January. The 7th Red Army was temporally forced out of the boundaries of Estonia. On 16 February the Red Army started a counteroffensive to recapture Estonia. The Soviet forces, including units of so-called Estonian Red Riflemen, captured the areas of Setomaa, Vastseliina and Räpina by 15 March. The Estonian 2nd Division counterattacked and recaptured Petseri by 28 March. Similar combat took place between the Estonian Army and the Northern Group of the Latvian Red Army along the Ainaži–Strenči–Alūksne front stabilised in north Latvia. In the positions along the Narva river, the Estonian 1st Division repelled 7th Red Army attacks.

=== Byelorussian direction ===
The Red Army entered Polotsk on 21 November, Drissa and Rahachow on 22 November, Zhlobin on 24 November, Babruysk on 28 November, Barysaw on 3 December, Slutsk on 8 December and Igumen on 9 December. On 10 December 1918, the Red Army entered Minsk almost unopposed, putting an end to the short-lived Belarusian People's Republic. On 1 January 1919, the Socialist Soviet Republic of Byelorussia (SSRB) was proclaimed in Smolensk. On 8 January, the SSRB government relocated to Minsk. At the same time, Polish and Belarusian self-defence units sprung up across western Belarus. Ill-equipped and composed mostly of local recruits, they were determined to defend their homes from what the newspapers described as a "Red menace". Similar Bolshevik groups were operating in the sector and a series of skirmishes ensued. The Polish-Soviet struggle over Vilna in the first week of 1919 was a sign of things to come, as the Polish militia was forced to withdraw after the first organised units of the Soviet Western Army entered the city. In response, the Polish Army started sending units eastwards to help the self-defence units, while the Soviets did the same but in the opposite direction. Open conflict seemed inevitable.

On January 12 Soviet High Command ordered deep scouting towards the Neman River. On February 12 that order was updated to include the Bug river. On that day Jukums Vācietis ordered the new Western Command to carry out a "reconnaissance in-depth" as far as Tilsit, Brest-Litovsk, Kowel and Rivne. He also ordered the securing of main railway junctions, including those in Vilna, Lida, Baranowicze and Luninets.

It is speculated that among the aims of the Bolsheviks one goal was to drive through eastern and central Europe and support the Revolutions in Germany and Austria-Hungary. However, it is unlikely that the Soviets really expected to reach the Vistula. The military orders were full of propaganda. The main goal of the operation was likely to see how much territory could be opportunistically grabbed in the chaotic governmental flux caused by the aftereffects of postwar Eastern Europe before any serious independent governing authorities arose.

Finally, the first Polish-Soviet clashes happened in mid-February, in the area of the towns of Bereza Kartuska and Mosty, where both armies clashed in a series of skirmishes. The Soviet offensive came to a halt by late February and it became apparent that a new line had established itself between the Polish and Soviet forces. Both the Soviet offensive and the Polish counterattack started at the same time, which resulted in an increasing number of troops being brought to the area.

=== Romanian direction ===
In early 1918, Bessarabia, a former Russian province, united with Romania after two months of independence as the Moldavian Democratic Republic. The Soviet did not accept the union and tried to retake the region by force. However, it all amounted to several sporadic attacks along the Dniester River. The Russians also attacked to support Communist Hungary, which had its own war with Romania. That was to no avail, as the region was successfully defended against Bolshevik attacks.

== Aftermath ==
The Baltic and Romanian Armies proved to be far more capable opponents than the Red Army had assumed. The Pskov Offensive of the Estonian Army's Petseri Battle Group captured Pskov on 25 May 1919, destroyed the Estonian Red Riflemen units in the process, and expelled all other Soviet forces from the territory between Estonia and the Velikaya River. The 7th and 15th Red Armies began a counteroffensive in Ingria and in the north of Pskov in July 1919, which regained most of the lost territories of Petrograd and Pskov regions. With weapons provided by Britain and France and operational support by the Estonian Army and the Royal Navy, the White Russian Northwestern Army began Offensive White Sword on 28 September 1919 with the aim of capturing Petrograd. The Northwestern Army approached to within 16 kilometres (10 mi) of the city, but the 7th Red Army repulsed the White Russian troops, driving them back into Estonia.

In the wake of the Soviet drive west as well as the Polish advance east through Byelorussia, a new line had formed between the newly created Soviet Socialist Republic of Byelorussia and the Republic of Poland. Armies from both sides regularly engaged in local clashes despite the yet peaceful relations between Poland and the Soviets. Such clashes marked a prelude to the Polish-Soviet War which began in April of the same year with the Polish Vilna Offensive.

== Historiography ==
A comprehensive historical analysis of the campaign against Poland was performed by Norman Davies in his book White Eagle, Red Star (1972). Davies mentioned the codename for this offensive: "Target Vistula"; however, it is not commonly used in historiography.

Norman Davies in his book claims that "Target Vistula" ("Цель – Висла" or similar) was the Soviet codename of the offensive. This term, however, is mostly absent in Polish and Soviet historiography of the period. In that association, one may notice the title "An Expedition beyond Vistula" (Pokhod za Vislu) of Tukhachevsky's memoirs about his Polish campaign. Other translations of the offensive include Operation Vistula (from Polish Operacja Wisła). Please notice that the term "Operation Vistula" commonly refers to a totally different event.

== Bibliography ==
- Davies, Norman (2003) [1972]. White Eagle, Red Star: the Polish-Soviet War, 1919–20 (First ed.). New York: St. Martin's Press, Inc. ISBN 0-7126-0694-7.
- Pilsudski, Jozef (1972). Year 1920 and its climax Battle of Warsaw during the Polish Soviet war 1919-1920.
- Neiberg, M.S.; Jordan, D. (2008). The Eastern Front 1914-1920. ISBN 978-1-906626-00-6.
- Thomas, Nigel; Boltowsky, Toomas (2019). Armies of the Baltic Independence Wars 1918–20. Bloomsbury Publishing. ISBN 9781472830791.
