= Jaan Sihver =

Estonian politician

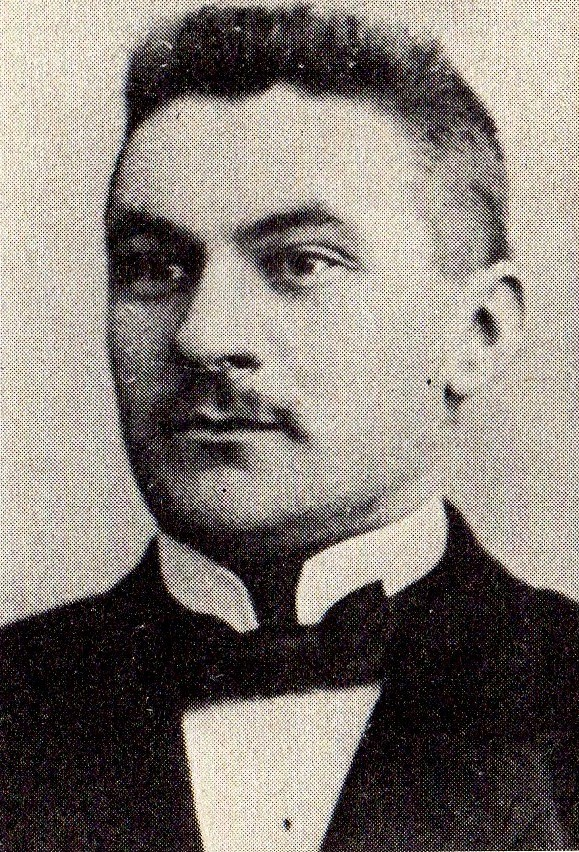
Jaan Sihver

Jaan Sihver (30 April 1879 Vana-Tänassilma Parish, Viljandi County – 28 November 1918 near Narva) was an Estonian communist politician. He was a member of the Estonian Provincial Assembly. On 5 February 1919, he was (posthumously) expelled from the assembly.
