= Members of the 5th Riigikogu =

Members of Parliament of Estonia 1932–1934

This is a list of members of the fifth legislative session of the Estonian Parliament (Riigikogu) following the 1932 elections (held on 21–23 May 1932). It sat between 15 June 1932 and 2 October 1934, when its activities were suspended. The session formally ended on 31 December 1937.

== Officers ==
=== Chairman ===
- 20.06.1932–19.07.1932: Karl Eenpalu
- 19.07.1932–18.05.1933: Jaan Tõnisson
- 18.05.1933–29.08.1934: Karl Eenpalu
- 28.09.1934–31.12.1937: Rudolf Penno

=== First Assistant Chairman ===
- 20.06.1932–19.07.1932: Tõnis Kalbus
- 19.07.1932–01.12.1933: Jaan Soots
- 01.12.1933–28.09.1934: Rudolf Penno

=== Second Assistant Chairman ===
- 20.06.1932–04.10.1933: Mihkel Martna
- 04.10.1933–02.10.1934: Karl Ast
- 02.10.1934–31.12.1937: Leopold Johannes Johanson

=== Secretary ===
- 20.06.1932–31.12.1937: Jaagup Loosalu

=== First Assistant Secretary ===
- 20.06.1932–31.12.1937: August Tõllasepp

=== Second Assistant Secretary ===
- 20.06.1932–31.12.1937: Oskar Gustavson

== List of members ==
- Ado Anderkopp
- Nigol Andresen
- Karl Ast
- Karl August Baars
- Adam Bachmann
- Nikolai Bulin
- Kaarel August Eenpalu
- Bernhard Eilman
- Rein Eliaser
- Karl-August Frants
- Karl Oskar Freiberg
- Johan Fuks
- Ivan Gorshkov
- Aleksei Gretshanov
  - Served until 24.03.1936; replaced by Egor Mazantsev
- August Gustavson
  - Joined on 25.05.1934, replacing Josep Rukki
  - Served until 21.06.1934; replaced by Johannes Kraan
- Oskar Gustavson
- Mihkel Hansen
- Johannes Hiob
  - Joined on 03.07.1934, replacing Johannes Kraan
  - Died in office on 27 September 1937; succeeded by Arnold Lainevool
- Johan Holberg
- Jaan Hünerson
- Johannes Jaanis
- Leopold Johannes Johanson
- Erich Jonas
- Mihkel Juhkam
  - Joined on 20.06.1932, replacing Otto August Strandman
- Aleksander Jõeäär
- August Jürima
- Juhan Kaarlimäe
- Tõnis Kalbus
- Aleksander Leon Richard Kapp
  - Joined on 27.09.1934, replacing Johan Sihver
- Alo Karineel
- Oskar Kask
- August Kerem
- Hermann Georg Willibald Koch
- Konstantin Konik
  - Died in office on 03.08.1936; succeeded by Jakob Sõnajalg
- Jakob Koppas
- Johannes Kraan
  - Joined on 21.06.1934, replacing August Gustavson
  - Served until 03.07.1934; succeeded by Johannes Hiob
- Priidik Kroos
  - Served until 01.03.1934; succeeded by Aleksander Välison
- Hugo Villi Kukke
- Rudolf-Aleksander Kuris
  - Served until 13.07.1933; succeeded by Helmut Maandi
- Aleksander Kärner
- Oskar Köster
- Roman Laes
- Arnold-Eduard Lainevool
  - Joined on 27.09.1937, replacing Johannes Hiob
- Jaan Lattik
- August Laur
- Stepan Leidtorp
  - Joined on 25.01.1935, replacing Hans Martinson
- August Julius Leps
- Efim Liivik
- Jaagup Loosalu
- Gustav-Eduard Lorenz
- Villem Maaker
- Helmut Maandi
  - Joined on 13.07.1933, replacing Rudolf-Aleksander Kuris
- Hans Martinson
  - Died in office on 25 January 1935; succeeded by Stepan Leidtorp
- Märt Martinson
- Mihkel Martna
  - Died in office on 23.05.1934; succeeded by Josep Rukki
- Jaan Masing
- Egor Mazantsev
  - Joined on 24.03.1936, replacing Aleksei Gretshanov
- Aleksander Mekkart
  - Joined on 18.07.1932, replacing Peeter Treiberg
- Mihkel Mihkelson
- Jaan Mõttus
- Aleksander Oinas
- Aleksander Ossipov
- Jüri Ottas
- Rudolf Penno
- Johannes Perens
- Eduard Pesur
- Jaan Piiskar
- Otto Pukk
- Mihkel Pung
- Konstantin Päts
- August Rattas
- Aleksander Leopold Raudkepp
- August Rei
- Marie Reisik
- Vladimir Rooberg
- Josep Rukki
  - Joined on 23.05.1934, replacing Mihkel Martna.
  - Served until 25.05.1934; succeeded by August Gustavson.
- August Johannes Salum
- Carl Schilling
- Peeter Schütz
- Johan Sihver
  - Served until 27.09.1934; succeeded by Aleksander Leon Richard Kapp
- Johannes Sikkar
- Aleksander Silverstov
- August Sirro
- Karl-Johannes Soonberg
- Jüri Mihkel Soontak
- Jaan Soots
- Aleksei Sorokin
  - Died in office on 01.04.1933; succeeded by Feodor Veiss
- Julie Steinmann
- Aleksander Sternfeld
- Otto August Strandman
  - Served until 20.06.1932; succeeded by Mihkel Juhkam
- Albert Suurkivi
- Oskar Albert Suursööt
- Jakob Sõnajalg
  - Joined on 03.08.1936, replacing Konstantin Konik
- Aleksander Sõster
- Johannes-Friedrich Zimmermann
- Theodor Tallmeister
- Karl Tamm
- Johannes Tammsoo
- Jaan Teemant
- Otto Tief
- August Tobro
- Kustas Tonkmann
- Peeter Treiberg
  - Served until 18.07.1932; succeeded by Aleksander Mekkart
- Artur Tupits
- August Tõllasepp
- Jaan Tõnisson
- Maksim Unt
- August Usai
- August Vann
- Feodor Veiss
  - Joined on 01.04.1933, replacing Aleksei Sorokin
- Mathias Westerblom
  - Joined on 20.06.1932, replacing Wilhelm von Wrangell
- Jüri Voiman
- Wilhelm von Wrangell
  - Served until 20.06.1932; succeeded by Mathias Vesterblom
- Richard Vreeman
- Aleksander Välison
  - Joined on 01.03.1934, replacing Priidik Kroos
