= Members of the 4th Riigikogu =

Members of Parliament of Estonia 1929–1932

This is a list of members of the fourth legislative session of the Estonian Parliament (Riigikogu) following the 1929 elections (held on 11–13 May 1929). It sat between 15 June 1929 and 14 June 1932, before the next round of elections were held.

== Officers ==
The following is a list of the Riigikogu's officers during the fourth legislative session:

=== Chairman ===
- Kaarel Eenpalu, from 02.07.1929

=== First Assistant Chairman ===
- Mihkel Martna, from 02.07.1929

=== Second Assistant Chairman ===
- Rudolf Penno, from 02.07.1929

=== Secretary ===
- Arnold Paul Schulbach, from 02.07.1929

=== First Assistant Secretary ===
- August Tõllasepp, from 02.07.1929

=== Second Assistant Secretary ===
- Jaan Piiskar, 02.07.1929 – 13.03.1930
- Oskar Gustavson, from 13.03.1930

== List of members ==
Name	Start of term	End of term
Mart Adamson	Start of session	End of session
Ado Anderkopp	Start of session	End of session
Johannes-Leopold Antik	15.10.1929 (replacing Jüri Ottas)	30.09.1930 (replaced by Jüri Uluots)
Karl Ast	Start of session	End of session
Karl August Baars	Start of session	End of session
Nikolai Bulin	Start of session	End of session
Kaarel Eenpalu	Start of session	End of session
Bernhard Eilman	Start of session	End of session
Rein Eliaser	05.10.1931 (replacing Jakob Westholm)	End of session
Karl Oskar Freiberg	Start of session	End of session
Johannes Fuks	Start of session	End of session
Aleksei Gretshanov	Start of session	End of session
Oskar Gustavson	Start of session	End of session
Johan Hagivang	Start of session	End of session
Werner Richard Karl Hasselblatt	Start of session	End of session
Anton Hermann	30.09.1930 (replacing Jaan Piiskar)	End of session
Friedrich-Voldemar Hist	Start of session	End of session
Johan Holberg	Start of session	End of session
Jaan Hünerson	Start of session	End of session
Johannes Janis	08.09.1930 (replacing Peeter Siegfried Põll)	End of session
Johan Jans	Start of session	09.07.1929 (replaced by Hugo Ratassepp)
Ado Johanson	Start of session	09.01.1932 (died; replaced by Paul Männik)
Leopold Johannes Johanson	Start of session	End of session
Erich Jonas	01.10.1929 (replacing Jaan Vain)	End of session
Mihkel Juhkam	Start of session	End of session
Aleksander Jõeäär	Start of session	End of session
Jaan Järve	15.10.1929 (replacing Hugo Bernhard Rahamäg)	End of session
Peeter Järve	Start of session	End of session
August Jürima	Start of session	End of session
Valter Kaaver	Start of session	End of session
Tõnis Kalbus	Start of session	End of session
Karl Kanep	24.03.1930 (replacing Oskar Tork)	End of session
Aleksander Leon Richard Kapp	Start of session	20.03.1931 (replaced by Aleksander Sternfeld)
Alo Karineel	Start of session	End of session
Oskar Kask	07.05.1930 (replacing Theodor Pool)	End of session
August Kerem	Start of session	End of session
Eduard Kink	Start of session	06.05.1931 (replaced by Maksim Unt)
Aleksander Kirikal	Start of session	End of session
Johannes Klesment	Start of session	End of session
Hugo Villi Kukke	16.02.1931 (replacing Aleksander Paulus)	End of session
Rudolf-Aleksander Kuris	Start of session	End of session
Aleksander Kärner	Start of session	End of session
Leonhard Käär	Start of session	End of session
Oskar Köster	Start of session	End of session
Mats Laarman	Start of session	End of session
Jaan Lattik	Start of session	End of session
August Laur	Start of session	End of session
Johannes Lehtman	09.07.1931 (replacing Villem Maaker)	End of session
August Julius Leps	20.05.1930 (replacing Karl-Eduard Pajos)	End of session
Oskar Karl Johann Liigand	01.11.1930 (replacing Herman Sumberg)	End of session
August Liivak	15.03.1930 (replacing Hugo Ratassep)	End of session
Julius Lill	Start of session	End of session
Jaagup Loosalu	Start of session	End of session
Gustav-Eduard Lorenz	16.06.1930 (replacing Voldemar Tartu)	End of session
Villem Maaker	Start of session	09.07.1931 (replaced by Johannes Lehtmann)
Hans Martinson	Start of session	End of session
Märt Martinson	Start of session	End of session
Mihkel Martna	Start of session	End of session
Jaan Masing	Start of session	End of session
Aleksander Mekkart	Start of session	End of session
Mihkel Mihkelson	Start of session	End of session
Hans Miller	Start of session	02.09.1930 (replaced by August Salum)
Alfred Julius Mõttus	Start of session	End of session
Paul Männik	09.01.1932 (replacing Ado Johanson)	14.03.1932 (replaced by Johannes Võmma)
Aleksander Oinas	Start of session	End of session
Jüri Ottas	Start of session	15.10.1929 (replaced by Leopold Antik)
Karl-Eduard Pajos	Start of session	20.05.1930 (replaced by August Julius Leps)
Aleksander Paulus	Start of session	16.02.1931 (replaced by Hugo Villi Kukke)
Rudolf Penno	Start of session	End of session
Eduard Pesur	Start of session	End of session
Jaan Piiskar	Start of session	30.09.1930 (replaced by Anton Hermann)
Theodor Pool	Start of session	07.05.1930 (replaced by Oskar Kask)
Mihkel Pung	Start of session	End of session
Peeter Siegfried Põld	Start of session	01.09.1930 (died; replaced by Johannes Janis)
Konstantin Päts	Start of session	End of session
Hans Pöhl	Start of session	22.01.1930 (died; replaced by Ervin Thomson)
Hugo Bernhard Rahamägi	Start of session	15.10.1929 (replaced by Jaan Järve)
Hugo Ratassepp	09.07.1929 (replacing Johan Jans)	15.03.1930 (died; replaced by August Liivak)
Aleksander Leopold Raudkepp	Start of session	End of session
August Rei	Start of session	End of session
Marie Reisik	Start of session	End of session
Aleksander Saar	Start of session	End of session
Jakob Saar	Start of session	End of session
August Johannes Salum	02.09.1930 (replacing Hans Miller)	End of session
Carl Schilling	Start of session	End of session
Theodor Schmidt	Start of session	End of session
Arnold Paul Schulbach	Start of session	End of session
Peeter Schütz	Start of session	End of session
Johan Sihver	Start of session	End of session
Johannes Sikkar	Start of session	End of session
August Sirro	Start of session	End of session
Valentin Smirnov	Start of session	End of session
Karl-Johannes Soonberg	Start of session	End of session
Jaan Soots	Start of session	End of session
Aleksander Sternfeld	20.03.1931 (replacing Aleksander Leon Richard Kapp)	End of session
Otto August Strandman	Start of session	End of session
Herman Sumberg	Start of session	03.11.1930 (replaced by Oskar Karl Johanes Liigand)
Oskar Albert Suursööt	Start of session	End of session
Aleksander Sõster	Start of session	End of session
Johannes-Friedrich Zimmermann	Start of session	End of session
Theodor Tallmeister	Start of session	End of session
Karl Tamm	Start of session	End of session
Villem Tammai	09.05.1931 (replacing Maksim Und)	End of session
Voldemar-Johannes Tartu	Start of session	16.06.1930 (replaced by Gustv-Eduard Lorenz)
Jaan Teemant	Start of session	End of session
Jaan Teetsov	Start of session	End of session
Ervin-Ernst-Friedrich Thomson	22.01.1930 (replacing Hans Pöhl)	27.01.1930 (replaced by Erich Friedrich Valter)
Kustas Tonkmann	Start of session	End of session
Oskar Tork	Start of session	24.03.1930 (died; replaced by Karl Kanep)
Artur Tupits	Start of session	End of session
August Tõllasepp	Start of session	End of session
Jaan Tõnisson	Start of session	End of session
Jüri Uluots	30.09.1930 (replacing Leopold Antik)	End of session
Maksim Unt	06.05.1931 (replacing Eduard Kink)	09.05.1931 (replaced by Villem Tammai)
August Usai	Start of session	End of session
Valde Uukareda	Start of session	End of session
Jaan Vain	Start of session	01.10.1929 (replaced by Erich Jonas)
Erich Friedrich Carl Walter	27.01.1930 (replacing Ervin Thomson)	29.01.1930 (replaced by Wilhelm Baron von Wrangell)
August Vann	Start of session	End of session
Richard Veermaa	Start of session	End of session
Mathias Westerblom	31.01.1930 (replacing Wilhelm Baron von Wrangell)	End of session
Jakob Westholm	Start of session	01.10.1931 (replaced by Rein Eliaser)
Juhan Vilms	Start of session	End of session
Jüri Voiman	Start of session	End of session
Wilhelm von Wrangell	29.01.1930 (replacing Erich Friedrich Valteri)	31.01.1930 (replaced by Mahias Westerblom)
Johannes Võmma	14.03.1932 (replacing Paul Männiku)	End of session

== Further information ==
- "IV Riigikogu koosseis [Composition of the fourth Riigikogu]", Riigikogu (in Estonian).
