= List of World Heritage Sites in Estonia =

World Heritage Sites in Estonia. Blue dots mark the sites of the Struve Geodetic Arc.

The United Nations Educational, Scientific and Cultural Organization (UNESCO) World Heritage Sites are places of importance to cultural or natural heritage as described in the UNESCO World Heritage Convention, established in 1972. Estonia accepted the convention on 27 October 1995, making its historical sites eligible for inclusion on the list. The first site added to the list was the Historic Centre (Old Town) of Tallinn, in 1997. The second site, the Struve Geodetic Arc, was added in 2005. This is a transnational site and is shared with nine other countries. Both sites are cultural sites. In addition to its World Heritage Sites, Estonia also maintains three properties on its tentative list.

== World Heritage Sites ==
UNESCO lists sites under ten criteria; each entry must meet at least one of the criteria. Criteria i through vi are cultural, and vii through x are natural.

* Transnational site

Site	Image	Location	Year listed	UNESCO data	Description
Historic Centre (Old Town) of Tallinn	Tallinn old town	Tallinn	1997	822; ii, iv (cultural)	The historic centre of Tallinn is an outstanding example of a medieval northern European trading city. The city started around the 13th century castle built by the knights of the Teutonic Order. From the 13th to the 16th century the city was an important centre of the Hanseatic League, being one of the most remote outposts of the League. Hanseatic Tallinn was a wealthy city, which is demonstrated by its opulent public buildings, including churches, the Town Hall, and the merchant's houses. The Walls of Tallinn, built in the 13th century, are still largely extant today.
Struve Geodetic Arc*	Old Tartu Observatory	Väike-Maarja Parish, Tartu	2005	1187, ii, iii, vi (cultural)	The Struve Geodetic Arc is a series of triangulation points, stretching over a distance of 2,820 kilometres (1,750 mi) from Hammerfest in Norway to the Black Sea. The points were set up in a survey by the astronomer Friedrich Georg Wilhelm Struve who first carried out an accurate measurement of a long segment of a meridian – and along with it the size and shape of the Earth. Originally, there were 265 station points. The World Heritage Site includes 34 points in ten countries (north to south: Norway, Sweden, Finland, Russia, Estonia, Latvia, Lithuania, Belarus, Moldova, Ukraine), three of which are in Estonia. The University of Tartu Old Observatory is pictured.

== Tentative list ==
In addition to sites inscribed on the World Heritage List, member states can maintain a list of tentative sites that they may consider for nomination. Nominations for the World Heritage List are only accepted if the site was previously listed on the tentative list. As of 2019, Estonia lists three properties on its tentative list.

Site	Image	Location	Year listed	UNESCO criteria	Description
Kuressaare Fortress	Kuressaare Castle	Kuressaare	2002	iv (cultural)	Kuressaare Castle was first mentioned in 1381. It was built for the bishop in Late Gothic style. Between the 15th and 17th centuries, the surrounding fortifications were added, some of which were later removed and some restored in the 20th century. Today, the castle is the most popular tourist destination on Saaremaa Island. The town park is a nature reserve with many plant species.
Baltic Klint	Päite cliff	Western Estonia	2004	vii, viii, ix, x (natural)	The Baltic Klint is a limestone escarpment, 250 kilometres (160 mi) of its length is in Estonia. The escarpment exposes sedimentary rocks up to 500 million years old, that have been undamaged by tectonic processes and contain an abundance of well-preserved fossils. They serve as a valuable basis for compilation of Cambrian and Ordovician regional and local stratigraphical classification.
Wooded meadows (Laelatu, Kalli-Nedrema, Mäepea, Allika, Tagamõisa, Loode, Koiva, Halliste)	Laelatu Wooded Meadow	Eight sites	2004	(mixed)	The wooded meadows are sparse wooden areas that are regularly mowed or grazed. They are similar to parks but have existed for millennia, and they have been crucial in supporting animal husbandry. Eight representative meadows are selected in this nomination.
