= Josep Rukki =

Estonian politician

Josep Rukki (also Joseph Rukki; 1880 Saksi Parish (now Tapa Parish), Kreis Wierland – 23 April 1942 Sverdlovsk Oblast) was an Estonian politician. He was a member of the V Riigikogu, representing the Estonian Socialist Workers' Party. He was a member of the Riigikogu since 23 May 1934. He replaced Mihkel Martna. On 25 May 1934, he resigned his position and he was replaced by August Gustavson.
