= Hõbeda =

Hõbeda may refer to several places in Estonia:

- Hõbeda, Lääne-Viru County, village in Kadrina Parish, Lääne-Viru County
- Hõbeda, Pärnu County, village in Lääneranna Parish, Pärnu County
