= Karinõmme Nature Reserve =

Protected area in Estonia

- Location within Estonia
- Location: Estonia
- Coordinates: 58°37′N 23°59′E
- Area: 389 ha (960 acres)
- Established: 2007

Karinõmme Nature Reserve is a nature reserve which is located in Pärnu County, Estonia.

The area of the nature reserve is 389 ha, or 3.88 km^{2}.

The protected area was founded in 2006 to protect valuable habitat types and threatened species in Karinõmme and Tarva villages (both in former Koonga Parish).
