= Valde =

Valde may refer to:

== People ==
=== Given name ===
- Valde Garcia (born 1958), American politician
- Valde Hirvikanta (1863–1911), Finnish politician
- Valde Uukareda (1886–1936), Estonian politician

=== Surname ===
- Pierre Valde (1907–1977), French stage actor and theatre director

== Places ==
- Valde-Ucieza, Spain
