= Ura Landscape Conservation Area =

Protected area in Estonia

- Location within Estonia
- Location: Estonia
- Coordinates: 58°35′10″N 24°12′10″E
- Area: 311 ha (770 acres)
- Established: 2007

Ura Landscape Conservation Area is a nature park which is located in Pärnu County, Estonia.

The area of the nature park is 311 ha.

The protected area was founded in 2007 to protect landscapes and biodiversity in Koonga Parish (including in Ura village) and its surrounding areas.
