= Theodor Schmidt =

Theodor or Theodore Schmidt may refer to:

- Theodor Schmidt (Estonian politician) (1897–?)
- Theodor Schmidt, president of the Austrian Olympic Committee, 1929–1938
- Theodor Schmidt, German sugar refinery owner
- Theodor Schmidt (physicist) (1908–1986), German physicist and 1964 Nobel Prize nominee
- Theodore Schmidt, character from the TV series "Queer as Folk"
- Theodore H. Schmidt (1904–1982), member of the Pennsylvania State Senate from District 44, 1955–1958
