= Aleksander Silverstov =

Estonian politician

Aleksander Silverstov (also Aleksander Seliverstov; 1900 – December 1933 near Narva-Jõesuu) was an Estonian politician. He was a member of the V Riigikogu, representing the Left-wing Workers.
