= Jakob Koppas =

Estonian politician

Jakob Koppas (1902 – 27 July 1937 Saksi Parish (now Tapa Parish), Kreis Wierland) was an Estonian politician. He was a member of the V Riigikogu.
