= Aleksander Välison =

Estonian politician

Aleksander Välison (1899–1971) was an Estonian politician. He was a member of the V Riigikogu, representing the Left-wing Workers. He was a member of the Riigikogu since 1 March 1934. He replaced Priidik Kroos.
