= Karuba =

Karuba may refer to:

- Karuba (board game), a tile-laying race game
- Karuba, Democratic Republic of the Congo, a village
- Karuba, Estonia, a village
- Karuba, a brand of coffee sold at Kwik Trip
