= Paul Männik =

Estonian politician

Paul Männik (3 September 1901 in Kabala Parish (now Türi Parish), Kreis Fellin – 25 January 1987 in Mercer Island, Washington) was an Estonian politician. He was a member of IV Riigikogu, representing the Farmers' Assemblies. He was a member of the Riigikogu since 9 January 1932. He replaced Ado Johanson. On 14 March 1932, he resigned his position and he was replaced by Johannes Võmma. Männik and his family emigrated from Estonia and settled in Ohio in 1950.
