= Anton Hermann =

Estonian politician

Anton Hermann (also Anton Härma; 19 May 1896 Vastemõisa Parish (now Põhja-Sakala Parish), Kreis Fellin – 7 March 1979 Tallinn) was an Estonian politician. He was a member of the IV Riigikogu, representing the Estonian Socialist Workers' Party. He was a member of the Riigikogu since 30 September 1930. He replaced Jaan Piiskar.
