= Sõnajalg =

Sõnajalg is an Estonian surname. Notable people with the surname include:

- Jakob Sõnajalg (1887–1947), Estonian politician
- Oleg Sõnajalg (1959–2025), Estonian entrepreneur

== See also ==
- Dryopteris (Estonian Sõnajalg), a fern genus
