= August Rattas =

Estonian politician

August Rattas (1892 – 1938? in Soviet Union) was an Estonian politician. He was a member of the V Riigikogu, representing the Left-wing Workers.
