= August Gustavson =

Estonian politician

August Gustavson (19 December 1894 Kalvi Parish (now Viru-Nigula Parish), Kreis Wierland – 26 December 1941 Ussolye prison camp, Perm Oblast) was an Estonian politician. He was a member of V Riigikogu, representing the Estonian Socialist Workers' Party. He was a member of the Riigikogu since 25 May 1934. He replaced Josep Rukki. On 21 June 1934, he resigned his position and he was replaced by Johannes Kraan.
