= Laes =

Laes or LAES may refer to:

== People ==
- Brent Laes (born 2000), Belgian football player
- Roman Laes (1905–1972), Estonian politician
- Väino Laes (born 1951), Estonian actor

== Other ==
- Latin American Economic System
- Liquid air energy storage, a form of cryogenic energy storage
