= Stepan Leidtorp =

Estonian politician

Stepan Leidtorp (born 21 July 1902 in Kaiu Parish, Harrien County) was an Estonian politician. He was a member of V Riigikogu. He was a member of the Riigikogu since 25 January 1935. He replaced Hans Martinson.
