= Leonhard Käär =

Estonian politician

Leonhard Käär (14 April 1904 Viru-Nigula Parish, Kreis Wierland – 21 December 1963 New Jersey, USA) was an Estonian politician. He was a member of IV Riigikogu.
