= Liivik =

Liivik is an Estonian surname. Notable people with the surname include:

- August Liivik (1903–1942), Estonian sports shooter
- Efim Liivik (1889–1942), Estonian politician
- Siim Liivik (born 1988), Estonian-Finnish professional ice hockey player
