= Naissoo Nature Reserve =

Protected area in Estonia

- Location within Estonia
- Location: Estonia
- Coordinates: 58°36′37″N 24°10′17″E
- Area: 116 ha (290 acres)
- Established: 1964 (2007)

Naissoo Nature Reserve is a nature reserve which is located in Pärnu County, Estonia.

The area of the nature reserve is 116 ha.

The protected area was founded in 1964 to protect Naissoo Oak Forest. In 2007 the protected area was designated to the nature reserve.
