= Ratassepp =

Ratassepp is an Estonian occupational surname: the word "ratassepp" literally means "wheelwright". Notable people with the surname include:

- Elsa Ratassepp (1893–1972), Estonian actress
- Hugo Ratassepp (1907–1930), Estonian politician
- Ursula Ratasepp (born 1982), Estonian actress
