= Eduard Pesur =

Estonian politician (1905–1969)

Eduard Pesur (3 March 1905 in Kohila Parish, Kreis Harrien – 1969) was an Estonian politician. He was a member of the III, IV, and V Riigikogu. He was originally elected as a member of the Estonian Workers' Party, but during the III Riigikogu he switched to the Estonian Socialist Workers' Party, which he represented thereafter.
