= Nedrema =

Village in Estonia

Coordinates: 58°33′N 24°07′E

- Village
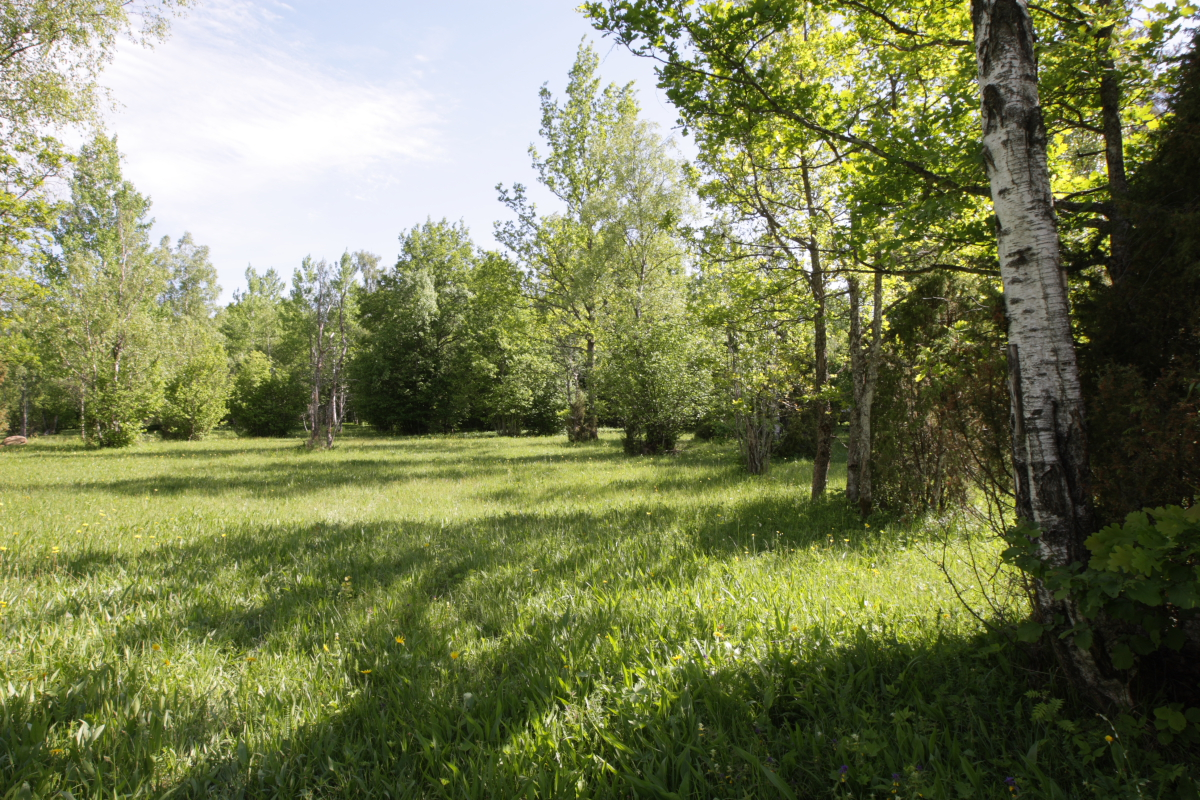
- Nedremaa wooded meadow
- Interactive map of Nedrema
- Country: Estonia
- County: Pärnu County
- Parish: Lääneranna Parish
- Time zone: UTC+2 (EET)
  - Summer (DST): UTC+3 (EEST)

Nedrema (German: Neutenorm) is a village in Lääneranna Parish, Pärnu County in southwestern Estonia. It was a part of Koonga Parish before 2017.

== See also ==
- Nedrema Nature Reserve
