= Mihkelson =

Mihkelson is a surname. Notable people with the surname include:

- Ene Mihkelson (1944–2017), Estonian writer
- Kaie Mihkelson (born 1948), Estonian actress
- Marko Mihkelson (born 1969), Estonian journalist and politician
- Mihkel Mihkelson (1899–1943), Estonian politician
