= Jakob Westholm =

Estonian politician (1877–1935)

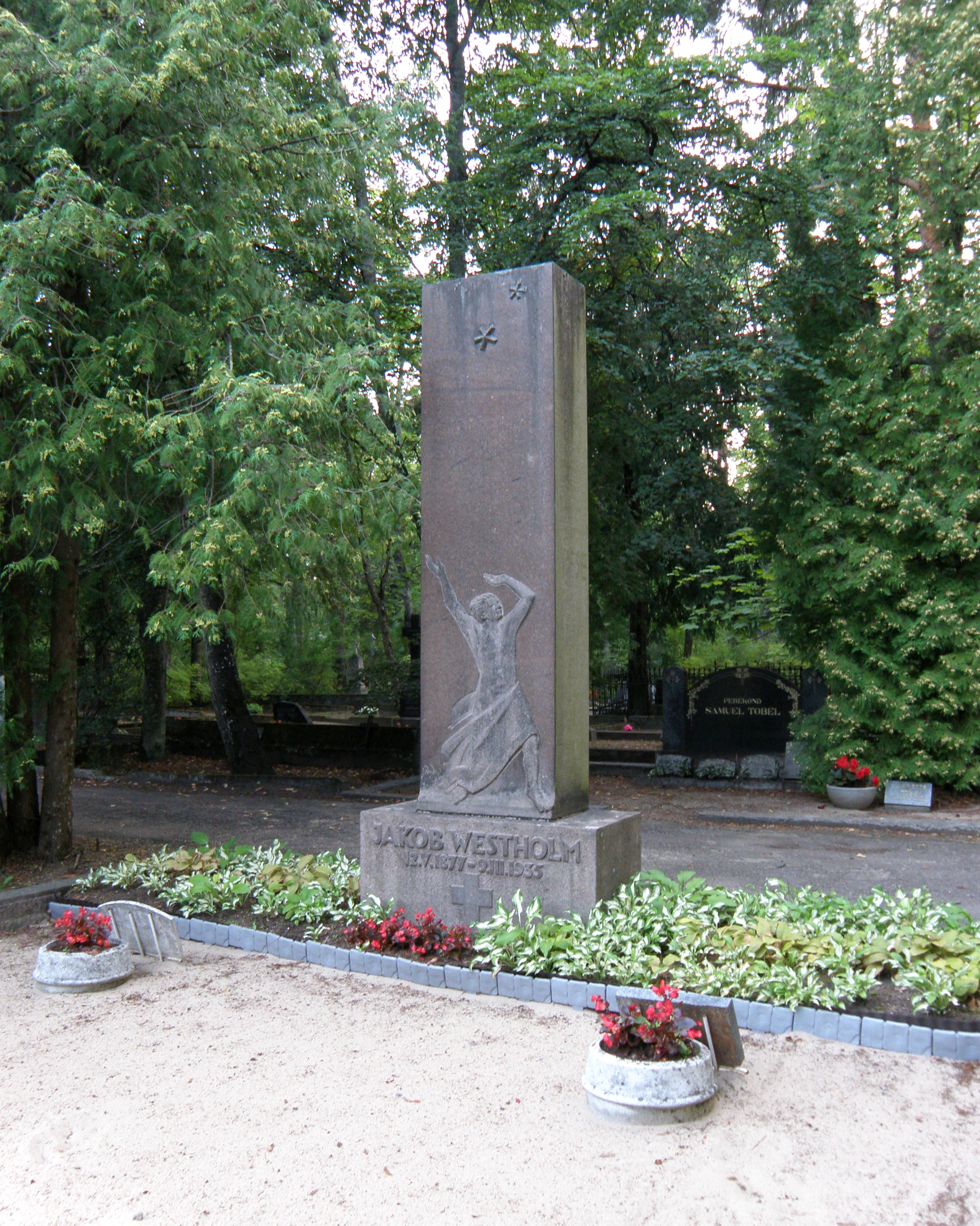
Jakob Westholm's grave at Rahumäe Cemetery in Tallinn.

Jakob Westholm (11 May 1877 in Palmse Parish (now Haljala Parish), Kreis Wierland – 9 March 1935 in Tallinn) was an Estonian educator and politician. He was a member of the I, II, III and IV Riigikogu, representing the Estonian People's Party.

He was not an original member of I Riigikogu, but was chosen in order to replace Adam Bachmann. Westholm, a teacher and headmaster, founded the Jakob Westholm Gymnasium as a private school for boys in Tallinn in 1907. The school is now a co-educational primary and secondary school and still bears his name. Westholm was instrumental in helping to create the legal and foundational basis of the Estonian education system.
