= Pikavere =

Pikavere may refer to several places in Estonia:

- Pikavere, Harju County, village in Raasiku Parish, Harju County
- Pikavere, Pärnu County, village in Koonga Parish, Pärnu County
