= Madissaare Nature Reserve =

Protected area in Estonia

- Location within Estonia
- Location: Estonia
- Coordinates: 58°36′N 24°01′E
- Area: 101 ha (250 acres)
- Established: 2007

Madissaare Nature Reserve is a nature reserve which is located in Pärnu County, Estonia.

The area of the nature reserve is 101 ha.

The protected area was founded in 2007 to protect valuable habitat types and threatened species in Rabavere and Tarva village (both in former Koonga Parish).
