= IRTA =

IRTA may refer to:

- Irish Real Tennis Association
- International Reciprocal Trade Association
- International Road Racing Teams Association
- IRTA Cup, motorcycling event
- Irta, alter ego of the Egyptian god Min-Amun
- Irta, a village in southwestern Estonia
- Short for "I read that as".
