= Priidik Kroos =

Estonian politician

Priidik Kroos (21 October 1889 Kreis Wiek – 1937 Soviet Union) was an Estonian politician. He was a member of the V Riigikogu, representing the Left-wing Workers. On 1 March 1934, he resigned his position and he was replaced by Aleksander Välison.
