= Veiss =

Veiss is a surname. Notable people with the surname include:

- Feodor Veiss (1888–1940), Estonian politician
- Konstantin Veiss (1896–1962), Estonian politician
