= Kõima =

Kõima may refer to several places in Estonia:

- Kõima, Pärnu, village in Pärnu (urban municipality), Pärnu County
- Kõima, Lääneranna Parish, village in Lääneranna Parish, Pärnu County
