= Lauaru Nature Reserve =

Protected area in Estonia

- Location within Estonia
- Location: Estonia
- Coordinates: 58°35′30″N 24°07′00″E
- Area: 88 ha (220 acres)
- Established: 1991 (2014)

Lauaru Nature Reserve is a nature reserve which is located in Pärnu County, Estonia.

The area of the nature reserve is 88 ha.

The protected area was founded in 1991 to protect Koonga Oak Forest.
