= Rein Eliaser =

Estonian politician (1885–1941)

Rein Eliaser (28 May 1885 Sangaste Parish, Kreis Dorpat – 14 October 1941 Sevurallag, Sverdlovsk Oblast) was an Estonian lawyer and politician. He was a member of IV and V Riigikogu. He was a member of the Riigikogu since 5 October 1931. He replaced Jakob Westholm.

In 1912, he married Anna Gailit, sister of author August Gailit. The couple had three children: Rein, Ruut and Elga.
