= Valter Kaaver =

Estonian politician

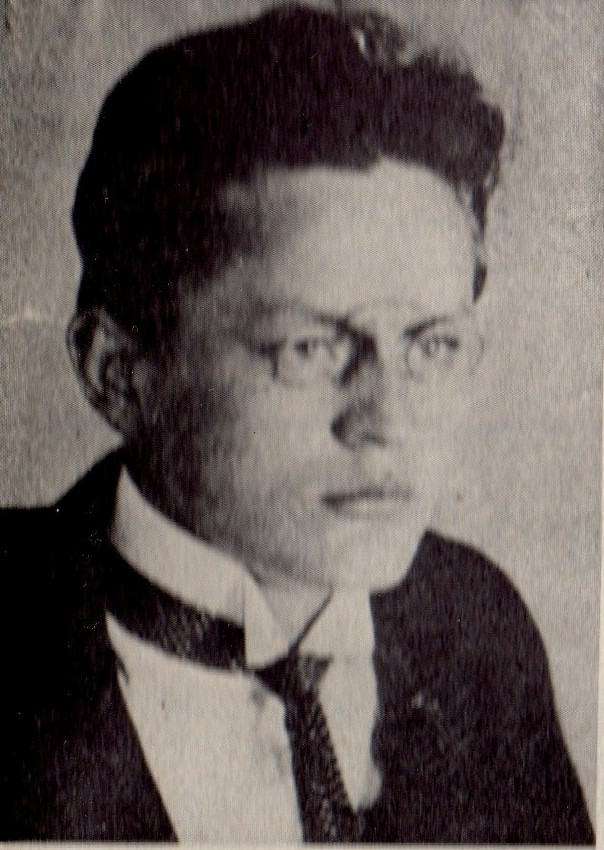
Valter Kaaver

Valter Kaaver (also Valter Kaver; 14 April 1904 Võru – 16 August 1946 Donetsk, Ukrainian SSR) was an Estonian politician. He was a member of the IV Riigikogu, representing the Estonian Workers' Party.
