= Egor Mazantsev =

Estonian politician

Egor Mazantsev (also Egor Masanzev; 1897 in Petserimaa – ?) was an Estonian politician. He was a member of V Riigikogu. He was a member of the Riigikogu since 24 March 1936. He replaced Aleksei Gretshanov.
