= Salevere =

Salevere may refer to several places in Estonia:

- Salevere, Lääneranna Parish, village in Lääneranna Parish, Pärnu County
- Salavere, Lääneranna Parish, village in Lääneranna Parish, Pärnu County, formerly known as Salevere

== See also ==
- Salavere, village in Saaremaa Parish, Saare County
