= Valentin Smirnov =

Valentin Smirnov may refer to:

- Valentin Smirnov (athlete)
- Valentin Smirnov (physicist)
- Valentin Smirnov (politician)
