= Kanep =

Kanep is an Estonian surname. Notable people with the surname include:

- Karl Kanep (1883–1935), Estonian politician
- Meelis Kanep (born 1983), Estonian chess player

== See also ==
- Kanepi, a small borough in southeastern Estonia
- Kaia Kanepi (born 1985), Estonian former tennis player
- Kaņeps, a Latvian surname
