= Jaan Mõttus =

Estonian politician

Member of V Riigikogu
- In office 15 June 1932 – 31 December 1937

Personal details
- Born: September 28, 1891 Kuigatsi Parish, Tartu County, Russian Empire
- Died: May 15, 1942 (aged 50) Kuigatsi Parish, Valga County, Estonia
- Party: Settlers’ Party
- Other political affiliations: Social Democrats (Earlier)

Jaan Mõttus (28 September 1891 Kuigatsi Parish, Tartu County – 15 May 1942 Kuigatsi Parish, Valga County) was an Estonian politician. He was a member of the V Riigikogu.

== Politics ==
- Mõttus became the secretary of Kuigatsi Parish. He was head of the administrative department of the Valga County Government from 1921–1924 and served as chairman of the Valga County Government from 2 February 1924 until 26 April 1930.
- He was elected as a member of the V Riigikogu (the fifth session of Estonia’s parliament), representing first the Social Democrats and later the Settlers’ Party.
