= Aleksander Mekkart =

Estonian politician

Aleksander Mekkart (22 October 1893, Tartu – 3 November 1983, New York) was an Estonian politician. He was a member of fourth and fifth legislatures of the Estonian Parliament.
