= Paimvere =

Village in Estonia

Coordinates: 58°35′N 23°58′E

- Village
- Interactive map of Paimvere
- Country: Estonia
- County: Pärnu County
- Parish: Lääneranna Parish
- Time zone: UTC+2 (EET)
  - Summer (DST): UTC+3 (EEST)

Paimvere is a village in Lääneranna Parish, Pärnu County in southwestern Estonia.

Before the Estonian local government administrative reform in 2017, the village belonged to Koonga Parish.

Politician and journalist Mihkel Martna (1860– 1934) was born in Paimvere.
