= Julius Lill =

Estonian politician

Julius Lill (18 July 1878 Tartu – 1 February 1951 Stockholm) was an Estonian politician. He was a member of IV Riigikogu. He was also Royal Swedish Vice Consul in Dorpat (Tartu) 1928-1940. Awarded the Royal Swedish Order of Vasa in 1938.
