= Johannes Tammsoo =

Estonian politician

Johannes Tammsoo (also Johannes Tamson; (25 February 1910 – 8 May 1992) was an Estonian politician. He was a member of V Riigikogu.
