= Friedrich-Voldemar Hist =

Estonian politician

Friedrich-Voldemar Hist (7 November 1900 Kaika, Vana-Antsla Parish (now Antsla Parish), Kreis Werro – 4 November 1943 Solikamsk, Russian SFSR) was an Estonian politician and painter. He was a member of IV Riigikogu.
