= Tamme, Pärnu County =

Village in Estonia

Coordinates: 58°35′28″N 24°13′21″E

- Village
- Interactive map of Tamme, Pärnu County
- Country: Estonia
- County: Pärnu County
- Parish: Lääneranna Parish
- Time zone: UTC+2 (EET)
  - Summer (DST): UTC+3 (EEST)

Tamme is a village in Lääneranna Parish, Pärnu County in southwestern Estonia. It was a part of Koonga Parish before 2017.
