= Urita =

Village in Estonia

Coordinates: 58°35′01″N 24°03′14″E

- Village
- Interactive map of Urita
- Country: Estonia
- County: Pärnu County
- Parish: Lääneranna Parish
- Time zone: UTC+2 (EET)
  - Summer (DST): UTC+3 (EEST)

Urita is a village in Lääneranna Parish, Pärnu County in southwestern Estonia. It was a part of Koonga Parish before 2017.
