= August Leps =

Estonian politician (1895–1972)

August Julius Leps (2 January 1895, in Adavere Parish (now Põltsamaa Parish, Kreis Fellin) – 26 February 1972, in Stockholm) was an Estonian politician. He was a member of the IV and V Riigikogu, representing the Farmers' Assemblies. He was a member of the Riigikogu since 20 May 1930, replacing Karl-Eduard Pajos.
