= Feodor Veiss =

Estonian politician

Feodor Veiss (also Friedrich Karl Veiss; 25 April 1888 – 1940 Germany) was an Estonian politician. He was a member of V Riigikogu. He was a member of the Riigikogu since 1 April 1933. He replaced Aleksei Sorokin.
