= Karl-August Frants =

Estonian politician

Karl-August Frants (also Karl-August Randsalu; 20 February 1895 Laanemetsa Parish (now Valga Parish), Kreis Werro – 17 August 1942 Sverdlovsk Oblast) was an Estonian politician. He was a member of the V Riigikogu.
