= Johannes Lehtman =

Estonian politician (1886–1953)

Johannes Lehtman (20 December 1886 Nehatu Parish (now Jõelähtme Parish), Kreis Harrien – 7 February 1953 Stockholm) was an Estonian politician. He was a member of the Estonian Constituent Assembly, representing the Estonian Labour Party and of the III and IV Riigikogu, representing the Settlers' Party. On 6 October 1919, he resigned his seat in the Constituent Assembly and was replaced by Jakob Sõnajalg.
