= Vastaba =

Village in Estonia

Coordinates: 58°39′N 24°06′E

- Village
- Interactive map of Vastaba
- Country: Estonia
- County: Pärnu County
- Parish: Lääneranna Parish
- Time zone: UTC+2 (EET)
  - Summer (DST): UTC+3 (EEST)

Vastaba is a village in Lääneranna Parish, Pärnu County in southwestern Estonia. It was a part of Koonga Parish before 2017.
