= Oskar Tork =

Estonian politician (1895–1930)

Oskar Tork (6 June 1895, Ahja Parish (now Põlva Parish), Kreis Dorpat – 24 March 1930, Tartu) was an Estonian politician. He was a member of the IV Riigikogu. After his death, he was replaced by Karl Kanep.
