= Kaņeps =

Kaņeps is a Latvian surname. Notable people with the surname include:

- Fricis Kaņeps (1916–1981), Latvian footballer
- Pauls Kaņeps (1911–2006), Latvian cross-country skier

== See also ==
- Kanep, an Estonian surname
