= Arnold-Eduard Lainevool =

Estonian politician

Arnold-Eduard Lainevool (also Arnold-Eduard Tan(n)aur; born 17 November 1904 Tallinn) was an Estonian politician. He was a member of the V Riigikogu, representing the Estonian Socialist Workers' Party. He was a member of the Riigikogu since 27 September 1937. He replaced Johannes Hiob.
