= Johannes Kraan =

Estonian politician

Johannes Kraan (born 5 October 1901 in Narva) was an Estonian politician and member of V Riigikogu, joining on the 21st of June 1934. He represented the Estonian Socialist Workers' Party. He was the successor of August Gustavson and on 3 July 1934, resigned from his position and was replaced by Johannes Hiob.
