= Juhan Vilms =

Estonian politician

Juhan Vilms (22 September 1893 Kabala Parish, Viljandi County – 22 February 1952 Buenos Aires) was an Estonian politician. He was a member of IV Riigikogu.
