= Vladimir Roopere =

Estonian politician

Vladimir Roopere (born Vladimir Rooberg; 17 January 1898 – 6 November 1942) was an Estonian politician. He was a member of V Riigikogu, representing the Farmers' Assemblies political party.

Vladimir Roopere was born in Kurna Parish, Harju County. Roopere served as a soldier in the Imperial Russian Army during World War I before joining the Estonian Defence Forces to fight in the Estonian War of Independence. In 1930, he graduated from the Faculty of Law of the University of Tartu.

From 18 May 1933 to 21 October 1933, he was Minister of Justice and Internal Affairs.

Following the Soviet invasion and occupation of Estonia in 1940, Roopere was arrested by Soviet authorities and placed within the gulag camp system. He died while incarcerated in Syktyvkar in the Komi Autonomous Soviet Socialist Republic in 1942.
