= Aleksander Kirikal =

Estonian politician

Aleksander Kirikal (10 January 1887 Tõstamaa – 24 August 1940 Tallinn) was an Estonian politician. He was a member of IV Riigikogu.
