= Julie Steinmann =

Estonian politician

Julie Steinmann (also Juliana Steinmann; 29 September 1883 Põlgaste Parish, Võru County – 8 December 1957 Stockholm) was an Estonian politician. She was a member of V Riigikogu.
