= Rudolf-Aleksander Kuris =

Estonian politician

Rudolf-Aleksander Kuris (26 November 1890 Vao Parish (now Väike-Maarja Parish), Kreis Wierland – 28 January 1950 Luton, England) was an Estonian politician. He was a member of IV Riigikogu.
