= Johannes Võmma =

Estonian politician (1900–1945)

Johannes Võmma (19 August 1900 Kuivajõe Parish (now Kose Parish), Harrien County – 7 March 1945) was an Estonian politician and soldier in the Estonian Defence Forces. He was a member of IV Riigikogu. He was a member of the Riigikogu since 14 March 1932. He replaced Paul Männik. He also served as the mayor of Raikküla.

Following the Soviet occupation of Estonia, Võmma was arrested by SMERSH counter-intelligence authorities on 13 October 1944. Võmma was accused of being hostile towards the Soviet Union and having organized the Omakaitse at the Germans' orders in Raikküla rural municipality and acted as its chief. On 3 January 1945, the Military Tribunal of the Leningrad Front sentenced Võmma to death and the execution was carried out by gunshot on 7 March 1945. Võmma was aged 44.
