= Lõpe, Pärnu County =

Village in Estonia

Coordinates: 58°33′59″N 23°59′01″E

- Village
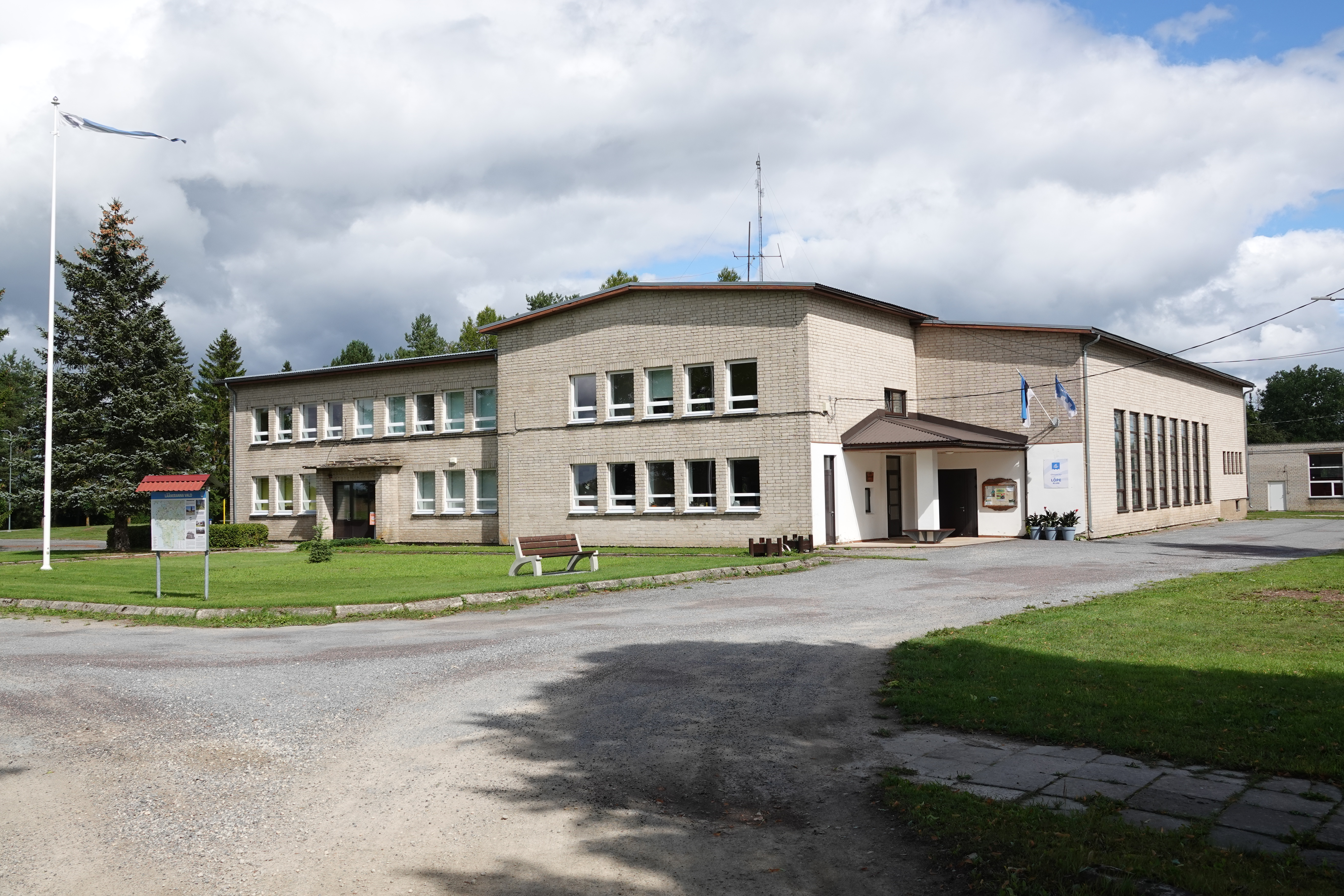
- Lõpe Culture House
- Interactive map of Lõpe, Pärnu County
- Country: Estonia
- County: Pärnu County
- Parish: Lääneranna Parish
- Time zone: UTC+2 (EET)
  - Summer (DST): UTC+3 (EEST)

Lõpe is a village in Lääneranna Parish, Pärnu County in southwestern Estonia. It was a part of Koonga Parish before 2017.

Lõpe is the location of Lõpe pig farm that accommodates 7,050 pigs. It is owned by OÜ Lõpe Agro and produces pigs for Rakvere Lihakombinaat.
