= Voldemar-Johannes Tartu =

Estonian politician (1900–1953)

Voldemar-Johannes Tartu (also Voldemar-Johannes Tarto; 23 April 1900 Narva – 14 December 1953 Esslingen, Germany) was an Estonian politician. He was a member of IV Riigikogu. On 16 June 1930, he resigned his position and he was replaced by Gustav-Eduard Lorenz.
