= Ivan Gorshkov =

Estonian politician

Ivan Gorshkov (7 May 1889 Tallinn – 29 January 1943 Gorki Oblast) was an Estonian politician. He was a member of the V Riigikogu.
