= Kustas Tonkmann =

Estonian politician

Kustas Tonkmann (1 July 1882 Vaikna Parish (now Lääne-Nigula Parish), Wiek County – 13 August 1942 Sverdlovsk Oblast, Russian SFSR) was an Estonian politician. He was a member of the II, III, IV and V Riigikogu.
