= Herman Sumberg =

Estonian politician

Herman Sumberg (12 August 1890 Lõve Parish, Viljandi County – 25 February 1964 Tartu) was an Estonian politician. He was a member of IV Riigikogu. On 3 November 1930, he resigned his position and he was replaced by Oskar Karl Johann Liigand.
