= Kulno Süvalep =

Estonian theatre director, actor, poet, translator, and songwriter

Kulno Süvalep (until 1934 Schulbach; 4 August 1929 Tallinn – 19 July 1996 Tartu) was an Estonian theatre director, actor, poet, translator, and songwriter.

Süvalep was the son of politician and journalist Arnold Paul Schulbach. In 1951 he graduated from Estonian State Theatre Institute. 1952-1954 he was director's assistant and actor at Estonian Drama Theatre. 1954-1961 he was principal stage manager (Estonian: peanäitejuht) at Rakvere Theatre. 1961-1989 he was an actor and director at Vanemuine Theatre.

Awards:

- 1977: Estonian SSR merited art personnel (Estonian: teeneline kunstitegelane)
- 1996: Aleksander Kurtna's translation prize

== Director's works ==
- Simukov's "Tütarlapsed, kaunitarid" (1952)
- Ostrovski's "Balzaminovi abiellumine" (1953)
- Luts' ja H. Luik's "Kevade" (1954, with K. Kiisk)
