= Hans Martinson =

Estonian politician (1872–1935)

Hans Martinson (26 August 1872 in Vana-Vändra Parish (now Põhja-Pärnumaa Parish), Kreis Pernau – 25 January 1935 in Rapla) was an Estonian politician. He was a member of the III, IV, and V Riigikogu. He was originally elected as a member of the Estonian Workers' Party, but during the III Riigikogu he switched to the Estonian Socialist Workers' Party, which he represented thereafter.
