= Albert Suurkivi =

Estonian politician (1894–1977)

Albert Suurkivi (26 February 1894 – 30 November 1977) was an Estonian politician. He was a member of the fifth legislature of the Estonian Parliament.

Albert Suurkivi was born on in Pajusi Parish in Kreis Fellin, now part of Põltsamaa Parish in Jõgeva County. After graduating from the parish school in Põltsamaa and then special agricultural courses, he did an internship at Pajusi Manor. Suurkivi's political career began in 1919 in the Väinjärve village administration and the municipal council. From 1924 he was the village head of Veinjärve, and from 1927 until 1934, he was the Järva County Commissioner and Chairman of the County Council. in 1932, he was elected a member of the Riigikogu. Following the Soviet occupation of Estonia during World War II, Suurkivi fled first to Germany, where he worked as the assistant chairman of the Estonian Red Cross in Flensburg and as the chairman of the congregation.

Suurkivi emigrated to the United States in 1949, where he first worked on a farm, and then from 1951 to 1958 at New Jersey's Panzer College as a house manager. From 1954 until 1958, he studied evening courses at Upsala College. After retirement, he purchased a farm in Alpha, New Jersey. He died in New Jersey in 1977, aged 83.
