= Jüri Mihkel Soontak =

Estonian politician

Jüri Mihkel Soontak (30 July 1901 Koonga Parish, Pärnu County – 14 August 1941 Pärnu) was an Estonian politician. He was a member of V Riigikogu.
