= August Tobro =

Estonian politician

August Tobro (12 March 1887 Aru Parish, Tartu County – ?) was an Estonian politician. He was a member of V Riigikogu.
