= Karl Oskar Freiberg =

Estonian journalist, theatre critic, playwright, translator and politician

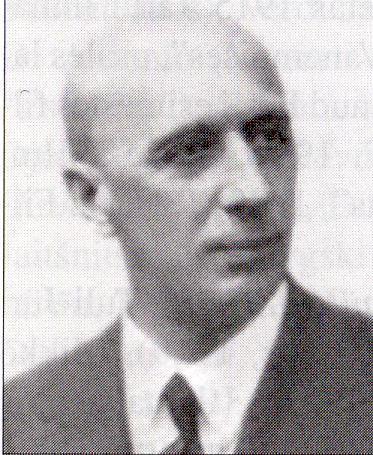
Karl Oskar Freiberg

Karl Oskar Freiberg (pen name, Oskar Kurmiste; 2 May 1894 Mäksa Parish (now Kastre Parish), Kreis Dorpat – 2 December 1941 Sverdlovsk, Russia) was an Estonian journalist, theatre critic, playwright, translator and politician. He was a member of the I, II, III, IV, and V Riigikogu.

Freiberg graduated from the University of Tartu in 1914. From 1916 he worked as a journalist on the editorial boards of several publications (Vaba Sõna, Töö Lipp, Võitlus, Tööliste Leht, Rahva Sõna). From 1934 until 1940 he worked as playwright at the Tallinn Workers' Theatre, and from 1940 until 1941, as a translator at the Estonian State Publishing House. Freiberg translated a number of scientific works and fiction from German, Danish and Norwegian. He has also translated several of Hella Wuolijoki's plays from Finnish.

In June 1941, he was arrested by the NKVD during the Soviet occupation of Estonia and imprisoned in Sverdlovsk Oblast where he was executed on 2 December 1941.
