= Johannes Klesment =

Estonian politician

Johannes Klesment (also Johannes Kleesment; 30 May 1896 Keila Parish (now Keila), Kreis Harrien – 23 December 1967 Washington, D.C.) was an Estonian politician. He was a member of the third and fourth legislatures of the Estonian Parliament, representing the Estonian Socialist Workers' Party. Klesment served as minister of justice in the Estonian government-in-exile from 1945 to 1953. In the 1950s, Klesment also served as the editor of The Baltic Review, a journal published in New York by the Committees for a Free Estonia, Latvia, and Lithuania from 1953 to 1971.
