= Johan Sihver =

Estonian politician (1882–1942)

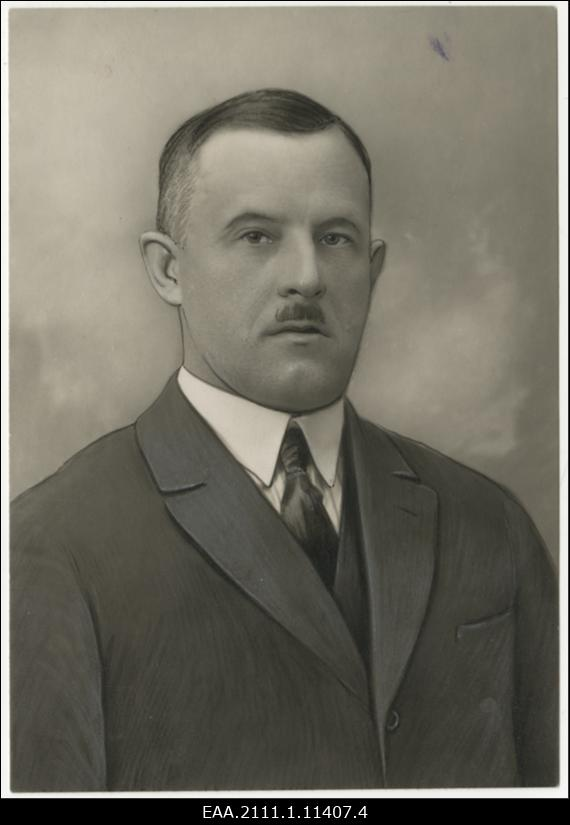
Johan Sihver

Johan Sihver (9 July 1882 Vana-Tänassilma Parish, Viljandi County – 27 January 1942 Solikamsk, Russia) was an Estonian politician. He was a member of the IV Riigikogu and V Riigikogu.
