= Villem Maaker =

Estonian politician (1891–1966)

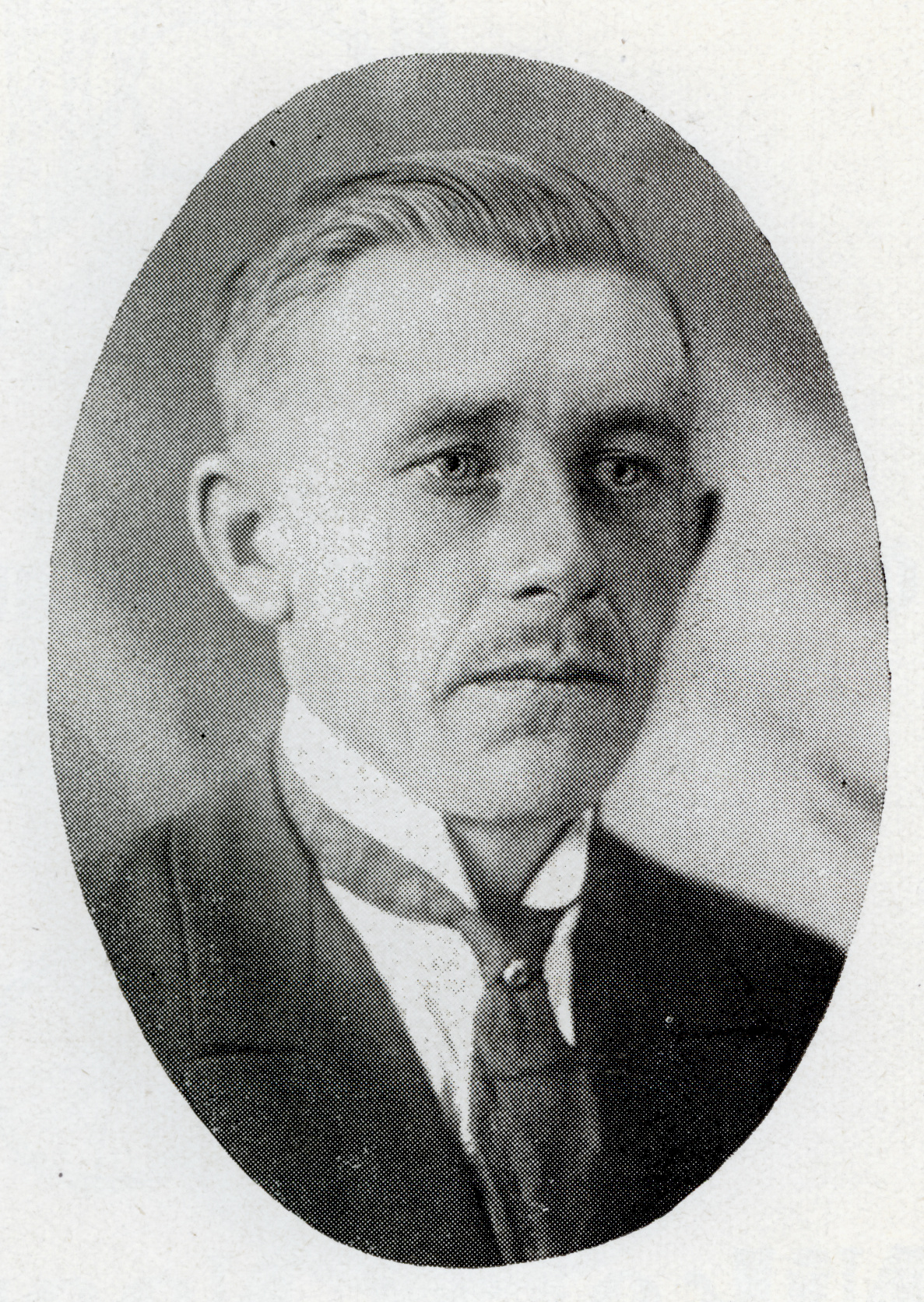
- Born: 1 May 1891; Palivere Parish
- Died: 29 October 1966 (aged 75); Kolmården
- Occupation: Politician

Villem Maaker (1 May 1891 – 29 October 1966) was an Estonian politician. He was a member of the I, II, III, IV and V Riigikogu.

Villem Maaker was born in Palivere Parish (now Lääne-Nigula Parish). He studied at the municipal school for three years, then he was homeschooled for one year. He then studied at evening school in Tallinn and improved his studies with private lessons. During the Estonian War of Independence, he joined the 1st Infantry Regiment. After Estonia gained independence, he worked in the Estonian Ministry of Agriculture from in 1919 until 1920 as caretaker-governor of the newly nationalized manors, and in 1920 as district governor of state lands, carrying out land reform. He was also a member of the board and editorial board of Asunik magazine.

Maaker was a member of the I–V composition of the Riigikogu; during the I composition, he was elected on the list of the Estonian Labour Party. In 1940, during the Soviet occupation of Estonia, he ran as a candidate in the II Riigivolikogu elections and organized national opposing candidates. He was able to avoid arrest by Soviet authorities by escaping into the forest for he duration of the occupation. During the German occupation of Estonia during World War II, he was imprisoned for five months.

In 1944 he fled to Sweden and worked as a textile worker in Norrköping and worked with several Estonian refugee organizations. Maaker died in Kolmården in 1966, aged 75.
