= Nedrema Nature Reserve =

Protected area in Estonia

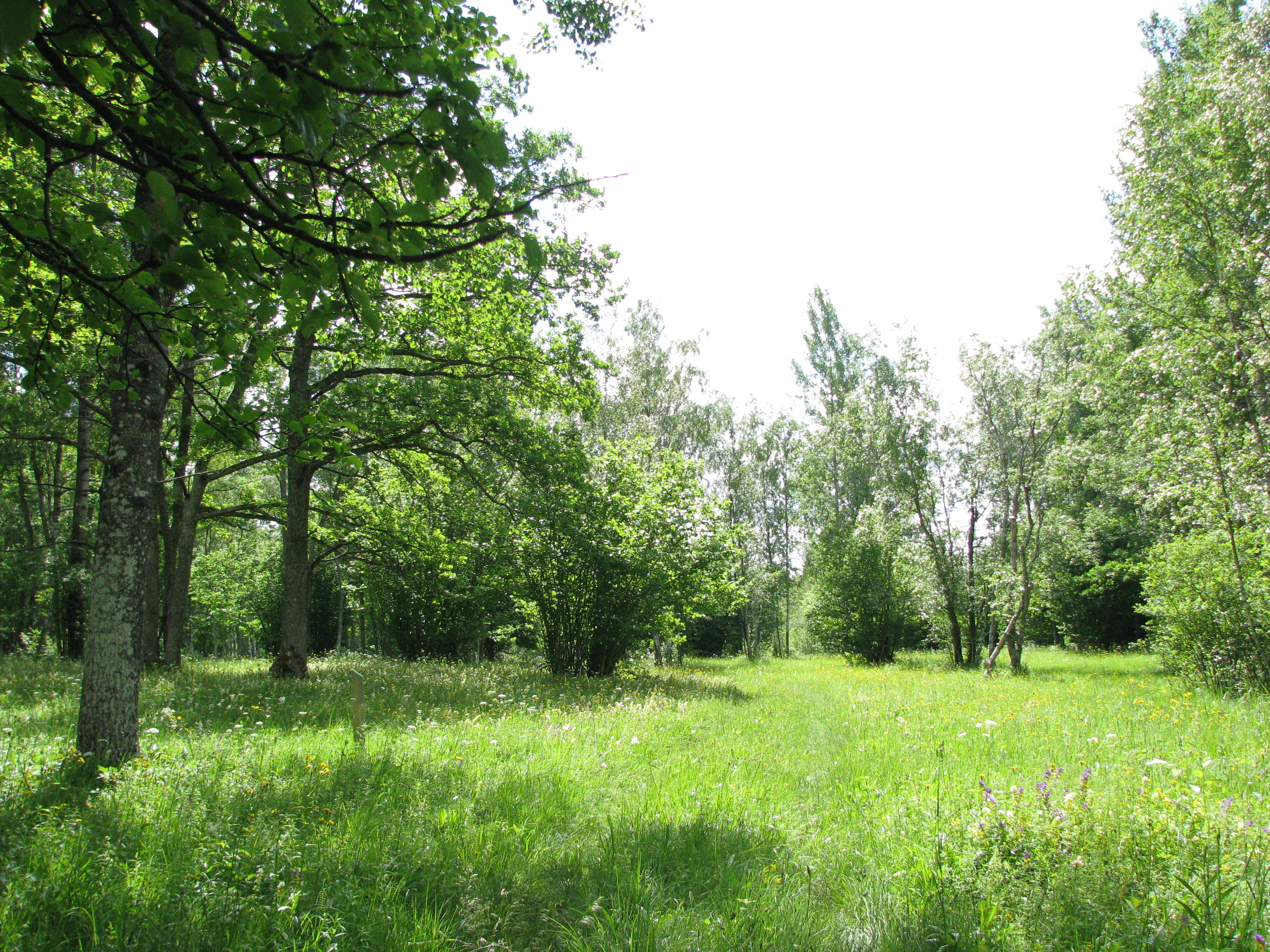

- Location within Estonia
- Location: Estonia
- Nearest city: Lihula
- Coordinates: 58°33′13″N 24°02′46″E
- Area: 2,429 ha (6,000 acres)
- Established: 2007

Nedrema Nature Reserve is a nature reserve situated in south-western Estonia, in Pärnu County.

The area was granted protection in 1991, and was designated a nature reserve in 2007. It is situated between two bogs and consists of damp woodland. The Nedrema wooded meadow, situated in the reserve, is Europe's largest traditional managed wooded meadow. The nature reserve is rich in wildlife and plants, notably fungi and unusual orchids.
