= Karl Kanep =

Estonian politician

Karl Kanep (1 December 1883 Rannu Parish (now Elva Parish), Kreis Dorpat - 30 March 1935 Tartu) was an Estonian politician. He was a member of the IV Riigikogu, representing the Estonian Workers' Party. He replaced the deceased Oskar Tork on 24 March 1930, and served through to the end of session on 14 June 1932.
