= Johannes Hiob (politician) =

Estonian politician

Johannes Hiob (23 June 1884 in Tallinn – 27 September 1937 in Tallinn) was an Estonian politician. He was a member of the V Riigikogu, representing the Estonian Socialist Workers' Party. He was a member of the Riigikogu since 3 July 1934. He replaced Johannes Kraan. Later, he resigned his position and he was replaced by Arnold Lainevool.
