= August Liivak =

Estonian politician

August Liivak (1896 – 26 May 1939 Tartu) was an Estonian politician. He was a member of IV Riigikogu. He was a member of the Riigikogu since 15 March 1930. He replaced Hugo Ratassepp.
