= Kurese =

Village in Estonia

Coordinates: 58°38′N 24°09′E

- Village
- Interactive map of Kurese
- Country: Estonia
- County: Pärnu County
- Parish: Lääneranna Parish
- Time zone: UTC+2 (EET)
  - Summer (DST): UTC+3 (EEST)

Kurese is a village in Lääneranna Parish, Pärnu County in southwestern Estonia. It was a part of Koonga Parish before 2017.

It has no permanent population, but dating of burial sites indicates that it is at least 1000 years old. The Soontagana stronghold is 2.5 kilometers (1.6 mi) away, and the village may be older than this. Until the Second World War it had 23 farms but, because there was resistance after war, many people were deported to Siberia by the Soviet authorities and the last permanent resident died in 1973. Very old stone fences and fields are preserved in the village.
