= Salavere, Lääneranna Parish =

Village in Estonia

Coordinates: 58°33′38″N 24°11′50″E

Salavere, Pärnu County
- Village
- Interactive map of Salavere, Pärnu County
- Country: Estonia
- County: Pärnu County
- Parish: Lääneranna Parish
- Time zone: UTC+2 (EET)
  - Summer (DST): UTC+3 (EEST)

Salavere (Salevere until 2017) is a village in Lääneranna Parish, Pärnu County in southwestern Estonia. It was a part of Koonga Parish before 2017.
