= Theodor Schmidt (Estonian politician) =

Estonian politician

Theodor Schmidt (1897–?) was an Estonian politician. He was a member of IV Riigikogu.
