= Adam Bachmann =

Estonian politician (1890–1966)

Adam Bachmann (later Adam Randalu; 12 May 1890 Lüganuse Parish, Wierland County – 10 April 1966 Tallinn) was an Estonian politician. He was a member of I Riigikogu.

1920 he was Minister of Labor and Welfare.
