= Efim Liivik =

Estonian politician (1889–1942)

Efim Liivik (20 March 1889 Meremäe Parish, Võru County – 4 March 1942 Sverdlovsk Oblast) was an Estonian politician. He was a member of V Riigikogu.
