= Hugo Ratassepp =

Estonian politician

Hugo Ratassepp (15 February 1907 Härjanurme Parish, Tartu County – 15 March 1930 Taagepera) was an Estonian politician. He was a member of IV Riigikogu. He was a member of the Riigikogu since 9 July 1929. He replaced Johan Jans. After his death, he was replaced by August Liivak.
