= Karinõmme =

Village in Estonia

Coordinates: 58°37′N 23°58′E

- Village
- Interactive map of Karinõmme
- Country: Estonia
- County: Pärnu County
- Parish: Lääneranna Parish
- Time zone: UTC+2 (EET)
  - Summer (DST): UTC+3 (EEST)

Karinõmme is a village in Lääneranna Parish, Pärnu County in southwestern Estonia. It was a part of Koonga Parish before 2017.
