= Hõbeda, Lääne-Viru County =

Village in Estonia

Coordinates: 59°23′35″N 26°04′48″E

Hõbeda
- Village
- Interactive map of Hõbeda
- Country: Estonia
- County: Lääne-Viru County
- Parish: Kadrina Parish
- Time zone: UTC+2 (EET)
  - Summer (DST): UTC+3 (EEST)

Hõbeda is a village in Kadrina Parish, Lääne-Viru County, in northeastern Estonia. It lies on the right bank of the Loobu River.
