= August Sirro =

Estonian politician

August Sirro (born 28 November 1883 Pada vald, Virumaa – 18 November 1966 Tallinn) was an Estonian politician. He was a member of IV Riigikogu.
