= Roman Laes =

Estonian politician

Roman Laes (13 September 1905, in Tallinn – 22 September 1971) was an Estonian politician. He was a member of the fifth legislature of the Estonian Parliament.

Laes died at Mercy Hospital in Chula Vista, California, in 1971.
