= Johannes Fuks =

Estonian politician (1890–1977)

Johannes Fuks (also Johan(nes) Kalda; 23 November 1890 – 18 June 1977) was an Estonian politician. He was a member of III and V Riigikogu.
