= August Vann =

Estonian politician

August Vann (23 October 1884 Varbola Parish, Harrien County – 6 February 1942 Sverdlovsk, Russia) was an Estonian politician. He was a member of IV Riigikogu.
