= Jakob Sõnajalg =

Estonian politician (1887–1947)

Jakob Sõnajalg (3 November 1887 Mäo Parish (now part of Paide), Kreis Jerwen – 4 May 1947 Paide) was an Estonian politician. He was a member of the Estonian Constituent Assembly, representing the Estonian Labour Party and of the V Riigikogu, representing the National Centre Party. He was a member of the assembly since 7 October 1919. He replaced Johannes Lehtman.
