= Valentin Smirnov (politician) =

Estonian politician

Valentin Smirnov (22 April 1887 Petserimaa, Pskov Governorate – ?) was an Estonian politician. He was a member of IV Riigikogu.
