= Karuba, Estonia =

Village in Estonia

Coordinates: 58°34′15″N 24°08′03″E

- Village
- Interactive map of Karuba, Estonia
- Country: Estonia
- County: Pärnu County
- Parish: Lääneranna Parish
- Time zone: UTC+2 (EET)
  - Summer (DST): UTC+3 (EEST)

Karuba is a village in Lääneranna Parish, Pärnu County in southwestern Estonia. Prior to the administrative reform in Estonia in 2017, Karuba was located in Koonga Parish. It was a part of Koonga Parish before 2017.
