= Ado Johanson =

Estonian politician

Ado Johanson (also Ado Johannson; 1 March 1874 Vastemõisa Parish (now Põhja-Sakala Parish), Kreis Fellin – 9 January 1932 Tallinn) was an Estonian politician. He was a member of the III and IV Riigikogu, representing the Farmers' Assemblies.
