= Valde-Ucieza =

Coordinates: 42°24′N 4°34′W

- municipality
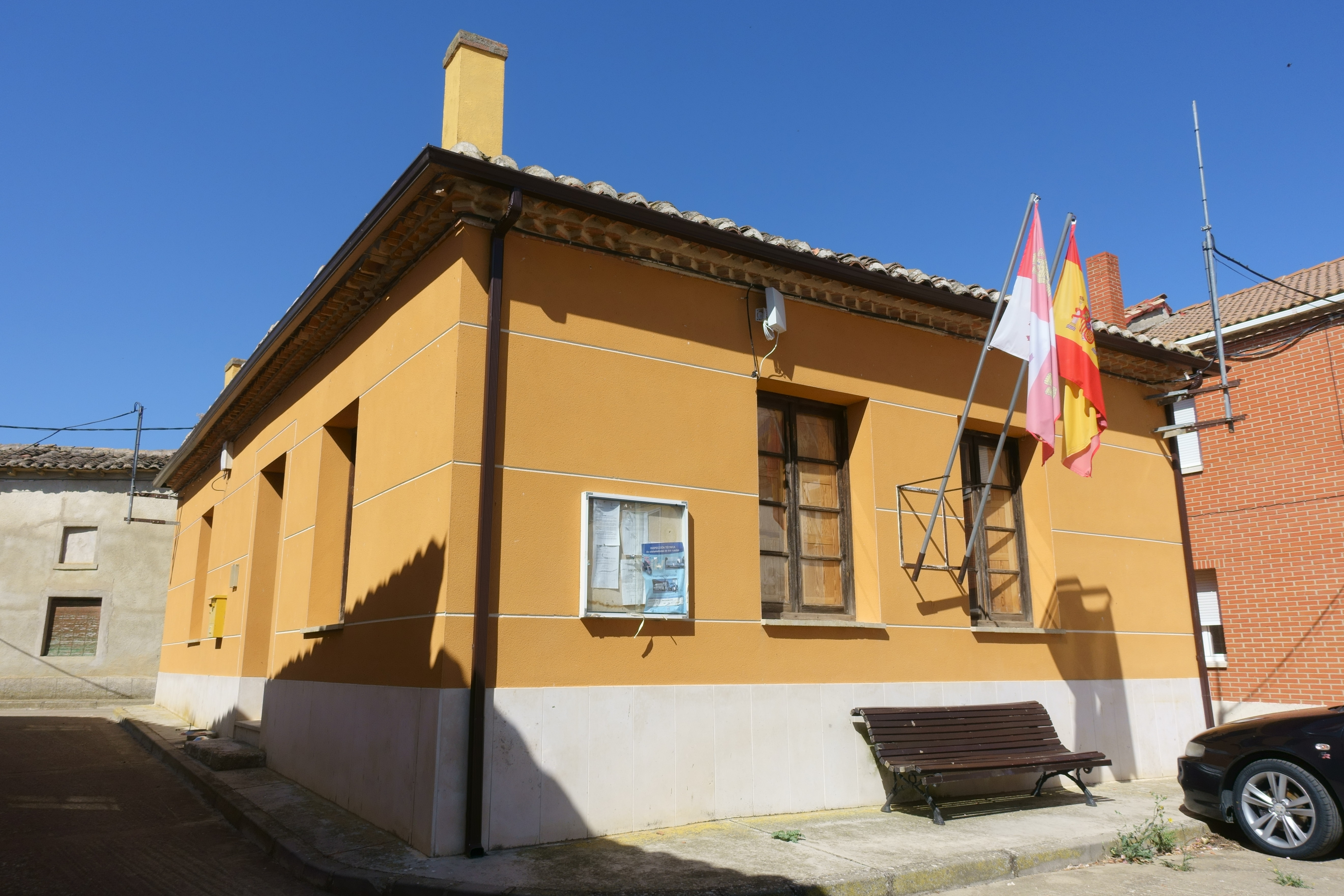
- Interactive map of Valde-Ucieza
- Country: Spain
- Autonomous community: Castile and León
- Province: Palencia
- Municipality: Valde-Ucieza

Area
  - Total: 42 km^{2} (16 sq mi)

Population (2025-01-01)
  - Total: 77
  - Density: 1.8/km^{2} (4.7/sq mi)
- Time zone: UTC+1 (CET)
  - Summer (DST): UTC+2 (CEST)
- Website: Official website

Valde-Ucieza is a municipality located in the province of Palencia, Castile and León, Spain. According to the 2004 census (INE), the municipality has a population of 117 inhabitants.
