= Kalli, Pärnu County =

Village in Estonia

Coordinates: 58°32′11″N 24°02′13″E

- Village
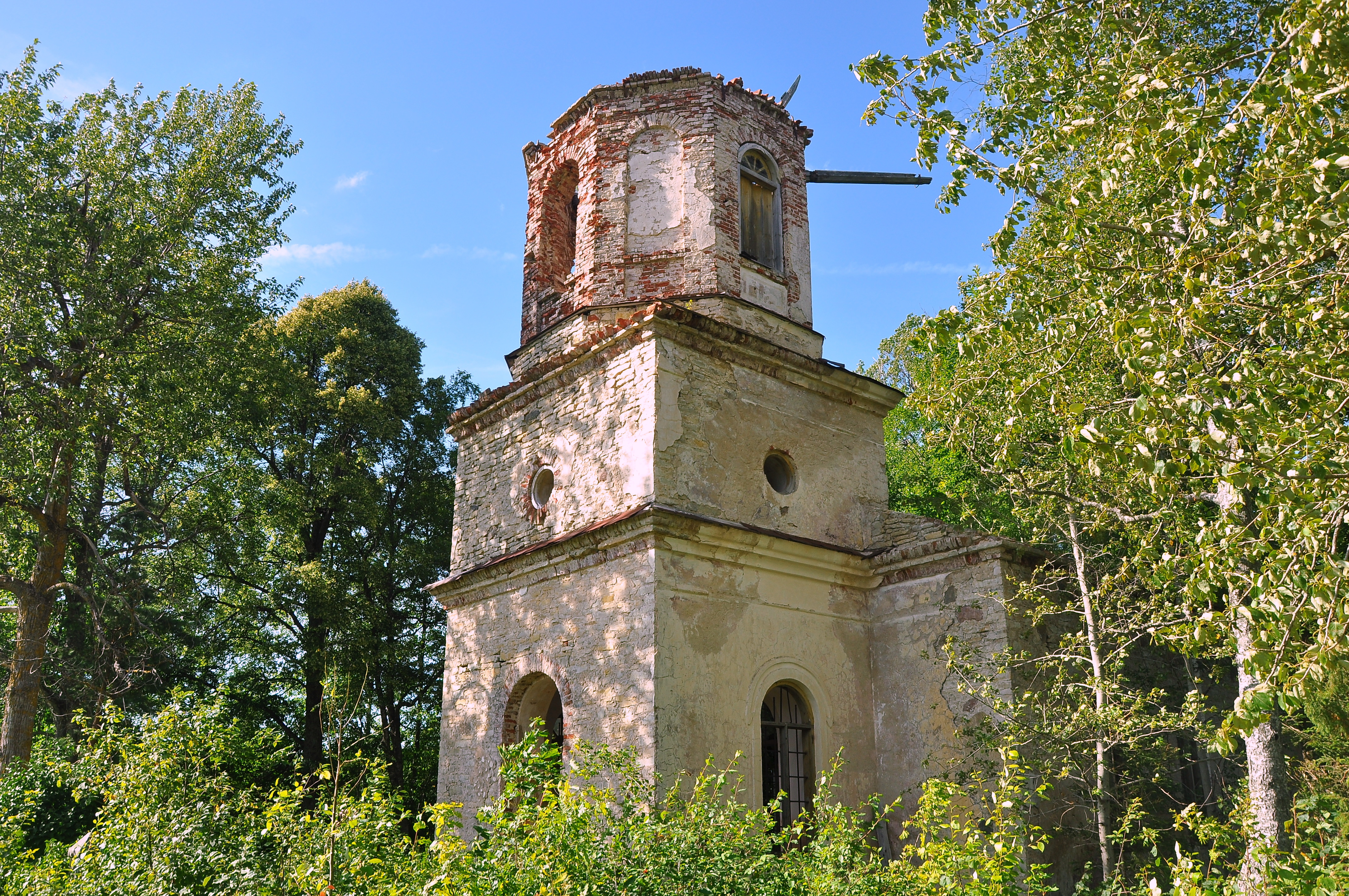
- Ruins of Kalli Orthodox cathedral
- Interactive map of Kalli, Pärnu County
- Country: Estonia
- County: Pärnu County
- Parish: Lääneranna Parish
- Time zone: UTC+2 (EET)
  - Summer (DST): UTC+3 (EEST)

Kalli (German: Kallie) is a village in Lääneranna Parish, Pärnu County in southwestern Estonia. It was a part of Koonga Parish before 2017.
