= Pikavere, Pärnu County =

Village in Estonia

Coordinates: 58°34′49″N 24°10′42″E

- Village
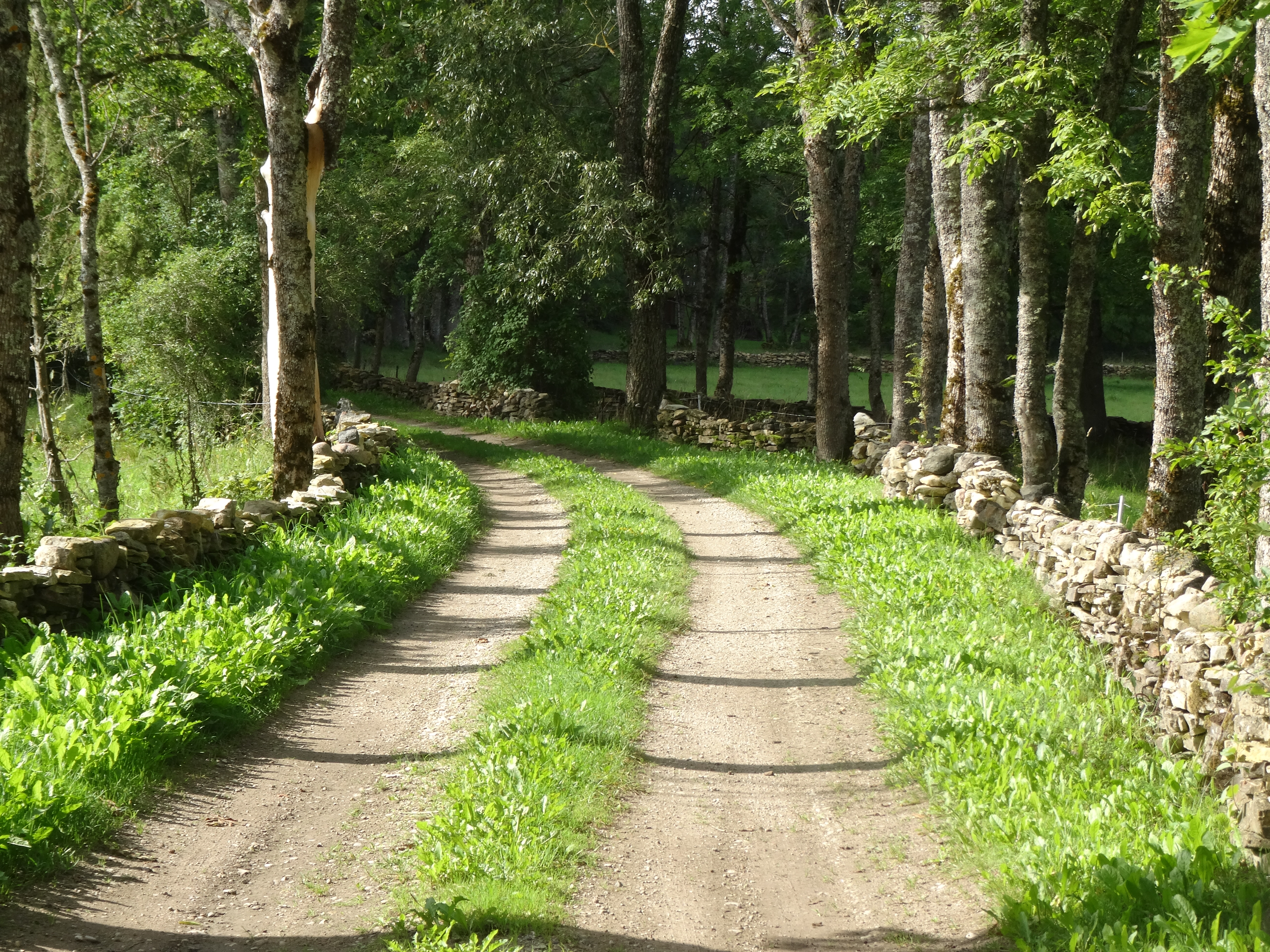
- Stone fences and road in Pikavere
- Interactive map of Pikavere, Pärnu County
- Country: Estonia
- County: Pärnu County
- Parish: Lääneranna Parish
- Time zone: UTC+2 (EET)
  - Summer (DST): UTC+3 (EEST)

Pikavere is a village in Lääneranna Parish, Pärnu County in southwestern Estonia. It was a part of Koonga Parish before 2017.
