= Aleksander Sõster =

Estonian politician

Aleksander Sõster (28 December 1890 Palmse – about November 1941 Mordovia) was an Estonian soldier and politician. He was a member of IV Riigikogu.
