= Leopold Johanson =

Estonian politician (1888–1941)

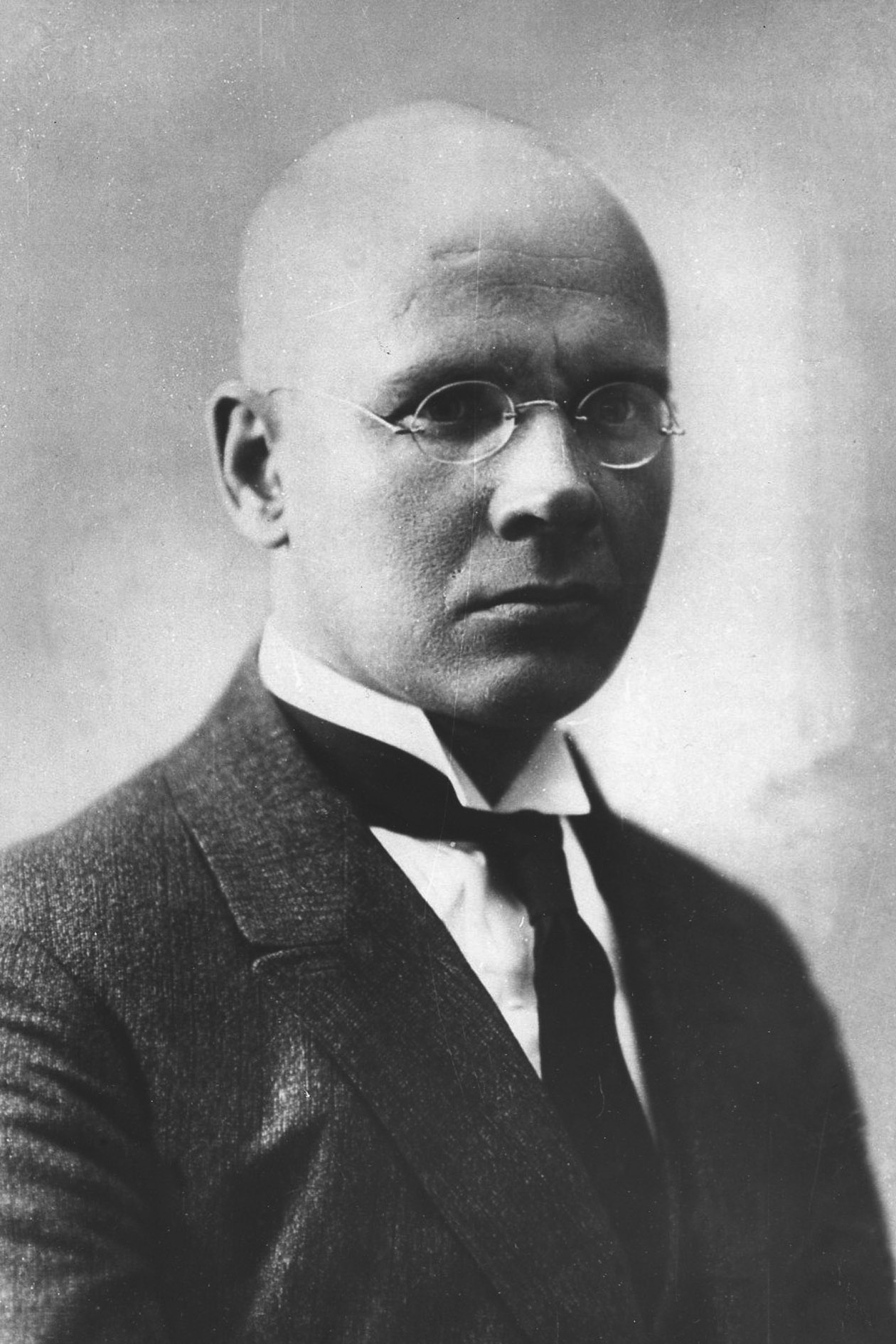
Leopold Johannes Johanson

Leopold Johannes Johanson (15 February 1888 Tartu – 5 December 1941 Sevurallag, Sverdlovsk Oblast, Russian SFSR) was an Estonian politician. He was a member of I Riigikogu, II Riigikogu, III Riigikogu, IV Riigikogu, and V Riigikogu.

1928–1929 he was Minister of Labour and Welfare and of Education. 1932–1933 he was Minister of Communications.
