= Valde Uukareda =

Estonian politician

Valde Uukareda, born 24 January 1886 at Palmse Parish, Virumaa, was an Estonian politician. He was a member of IV Riigikogu. He died at 16 June 1939 at Kuksema Parish, Järva County.
