= Arnold Paul Schulbach =

Estonian politician (1888–1968)

Arnold Paul Schulbach (later Arnold Paul Süvalep; 18 April 1888, in Avinurme Parish (now Mustvee Parish), Kreis Dorpat – 23 June 1968, in Tallinn) was an Estonian politician and journalist. He was a member of the I, II, III, and IV Riigikogu.

From 1929 until 1932 he was Secretary of IV Riigikogu. His son was theatre director, actor, poet, translator, and songwriter Kulno Süvalep.
