= August Tõllasepp =

Estonian politician (1885–1970)

August Tõllasepp (2 November 1885, in Konguta Parish (now Elva Parish), Kreis Dorpat – 18 December 1970, in Tartu) was an Estonian politician and meteorologist. He was a member of III, IV and V Riigikogu.

1932-1937 he was First Assistant Secretary of V Riigikogu.
