= Mihkel Mihkelson =

Estonian politician (1899–1943)

Mihkel Mihkelson (25 December 1899 Surju Parish, Pärnu County – 13 September 1943 Tubelsk) was an Estonian politician. He was a member of IV Riigikogu.
