= Oskar Gustavson =

Estonian politician

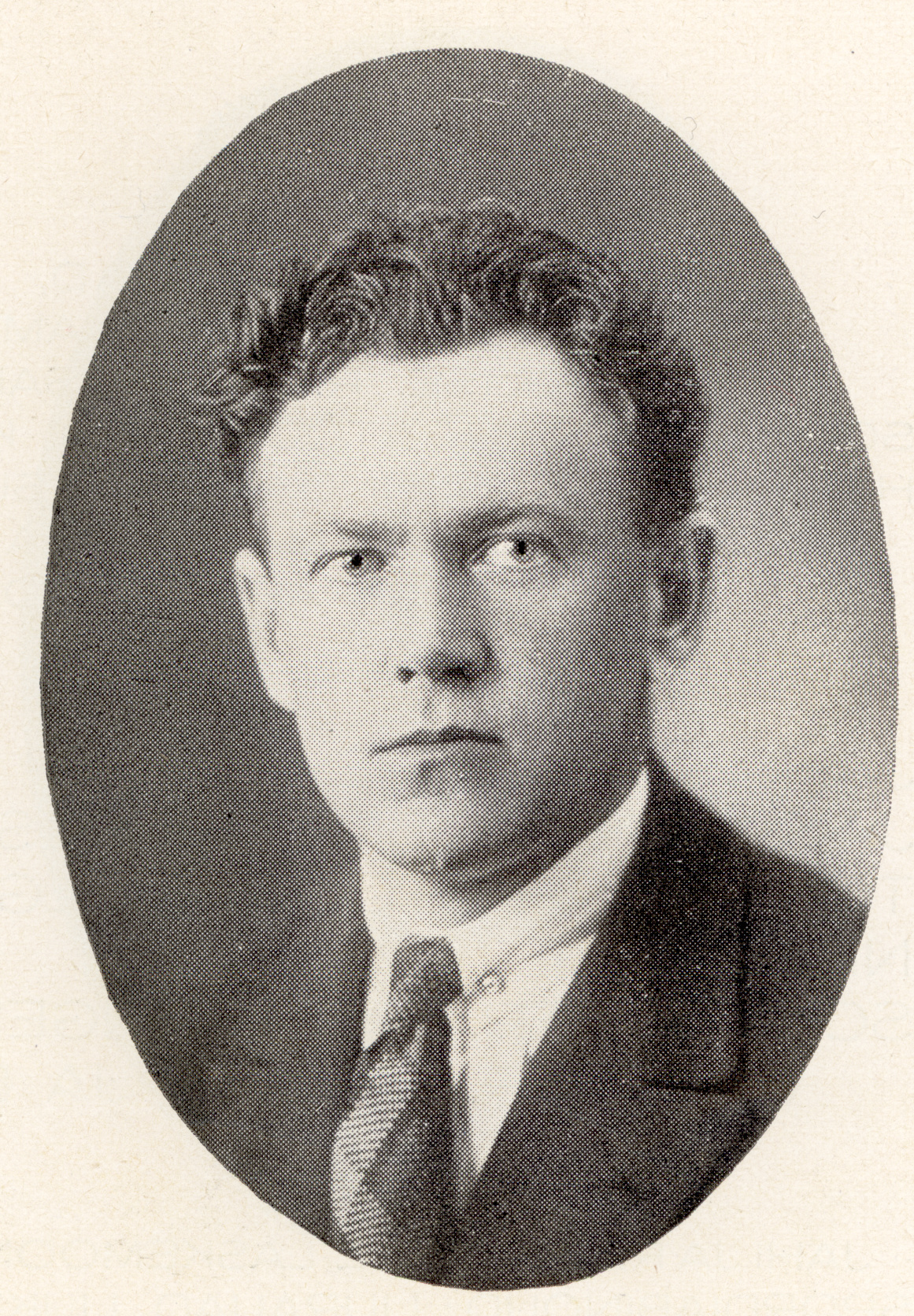
Oskar Gustavson.

Oskar Gustavson (14 February 1889 Kogula Parish (now Saaremaa Parish), Kreis Ösel – 10 December 1945 Tallinn) was an Estonian politician, editor and journalist. He was a member of the I, II, III, IV and V Riigikogu.

1932 to 1937 he was Second Assistant Secretary of V Riigikogu.
