= Aleksei Gretshanov =

Estonian politician

Aleksei Gretshanov (1897–?) was an Estonian politician. He was a member of IV Riigikogu.
