= Jaan Piiskar =

Estonian politician (1883–1942)

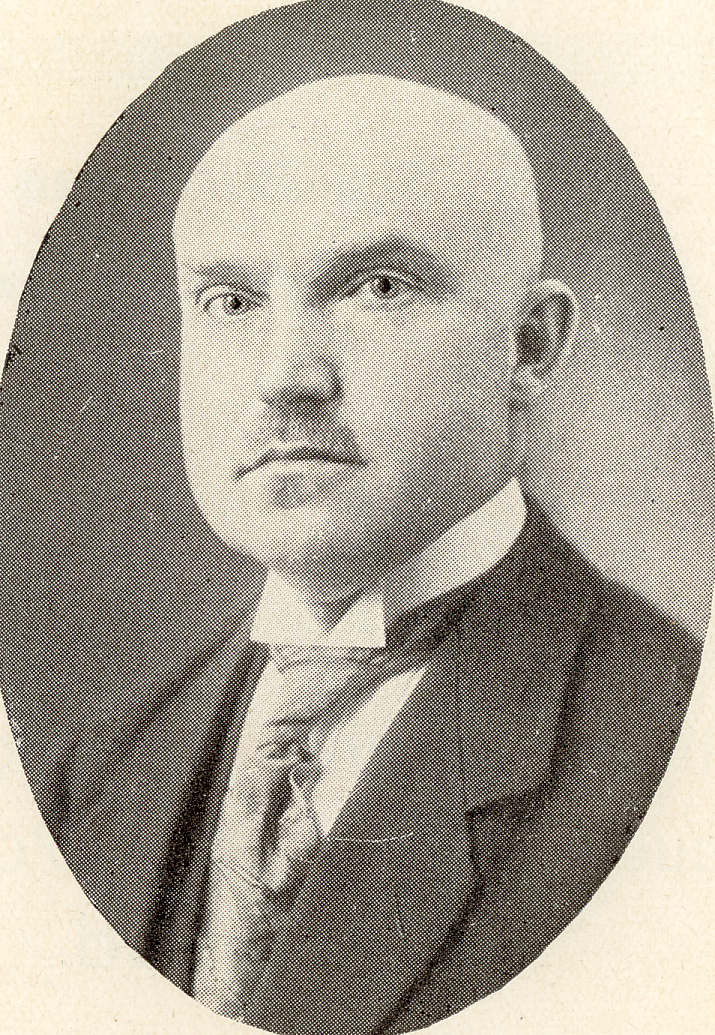
Jaan Piiskar

Jaan Piiskar (11 February 1883, in Vastemõisa Parish (now Põhja-Sakala Parish, Kreis Fellin – 19 December 1942, in Sevurallag, Sverdlovsk Oblast, Russian SFSR) was an Estonian educator and politician.

From 1931 until 1932 he was Minister of Education and Social Affairs.

Piiskar was a member of the I, II, III, IV and V Riigikogu. Following the Soviet occupation of Estonia in 1940, Piiskar was arrested by the NKVD in Tallinn and placed within the Gulag camp system. Piiskar died in custody in 1941.
