= Rudolf Penno =

Estonian politician (1896–1951)

Rudolf Penno (12 May 1896, Undla Parish (now Kadrina Parish), Wierland County – 25 November 1951, Stockholm) was an Estonian politician. He was a member of the V Riigikogu, where he was the chairman from 1934 to 1937.
