= Aleksei Sorokin (politician) =

Estonian lawyer and politician (1888–1933)

Aleksei Sorokin (Russian: Алексей Сорокин; 17 March 1888, Tallinn – 1 April 1933, Tallinn) was an Estonian lawyer and politician. He was regarded as one of the leading representatives of the Russian minority in Estonia during the interwar period.

== Life ==
Sorokin was born into a Russian-speaking family in Tallinn. He attended the Grammar School of Emperor Nikolai I (today Gustav Adolf Grammar School).

In 1912, he graduated with a degree in jurisprudence from Saint Petersburg State University. From 1912 to 1914, he worked at the District Court of Tallinn. From 1914, he worked as a lawyer and defense lawyer and as a legal adviser to authorities in Tallinn.

With the declaration of independence of Estonia in 1918, Sorokin went into politics. At the end of 1918, he founded the "Provisional Russian Council of Estonia" (Estonian: Eesti Ajutine Vene Nõukogu) with like-minded people, representing the Russians living in Estonia. In the Provisional Government of Prime Minister Konstantin Päts, he represented as a minister from the Russian minority from 28 February to 9 May 1919. He belonged to the Assembly of Russian Citizens (Vene Kodanikkude Kogu, Собрание русских граждан).

In the Constituent Assembly (Asutav Kogu) election in April 1919, he was elected as the only member of the Russian minority in the Constituent Assembly. He participated in the drafting of the Constitution of Estonia. However, Sorokin, together with the three deputies representing the Baltic German minority, was not one of the signatories of the Estonian Declaration of Independence on 19 May 1919; he abstained.

In the Riigikogu election in November 1920, Sorokin was the only Russian to be voted into the Riigikogu. He was a candidate for the center-right Russian National Federation in Estonia (Vene Rahvuslik Liit Eestis, Русский национальный союз в Эстонии), founded in 1920. In 1923, he resigned from the legislature and returned to being a lawyer. He remained, along with Nikolai Kurtšinski and Peeter Baranin, as a leading member of the Russian minority in Estonia in the interwar period. However, he also failed to assemble the fragmented minority of large social differences into a party or association, as was the case with the Baltic Germans.

In 1931, Sorokin became vice-chairman of the Russian National Union in Estonia. In 1933, shortly before his death, he was elected chairman. In the Riigikogu election in 1932, he was again elected as a member of the Russian minority in parliament with a party alliance of various Russian groups. He also took over the group's presidency. At that time, the various Russian groups gained eight seats.

Sorokin died in Tallinn in April 1933 as a result of a long-term heart ailment.
