= Aleksander Leon Richard Kapp =

Estonian politician (1874–1940)

Aleksander Leon Richard Kapp (6 July 1874 Suure-Jaani Parish (now Põhja-Sakala Parish), Kreis Fellin – 9 September 1940 Tallinn) was an Estonian politician. He was a member of Estonian Constituent Assembly. He was a member of the assembly since 30 July 1919. He replaced Johan Kõpp.
