= Koonga Parish =

Former municipality of Estonia

Coordinates: 58°35′N 24°9′E

Koonga Parish Koonga vald
- Former municipality of Estonia
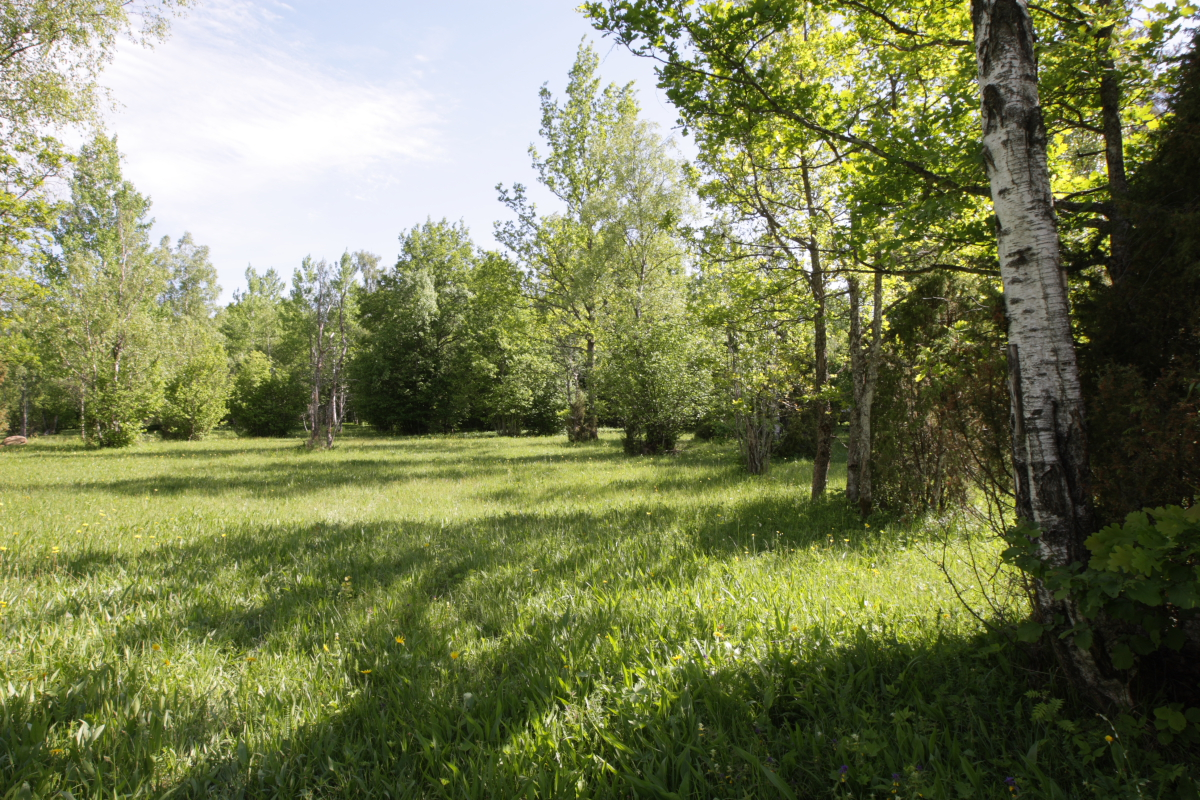
- Forest in Nedrema

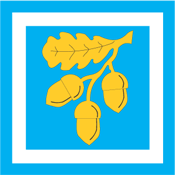
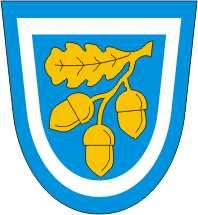
- Flag Coat of arms

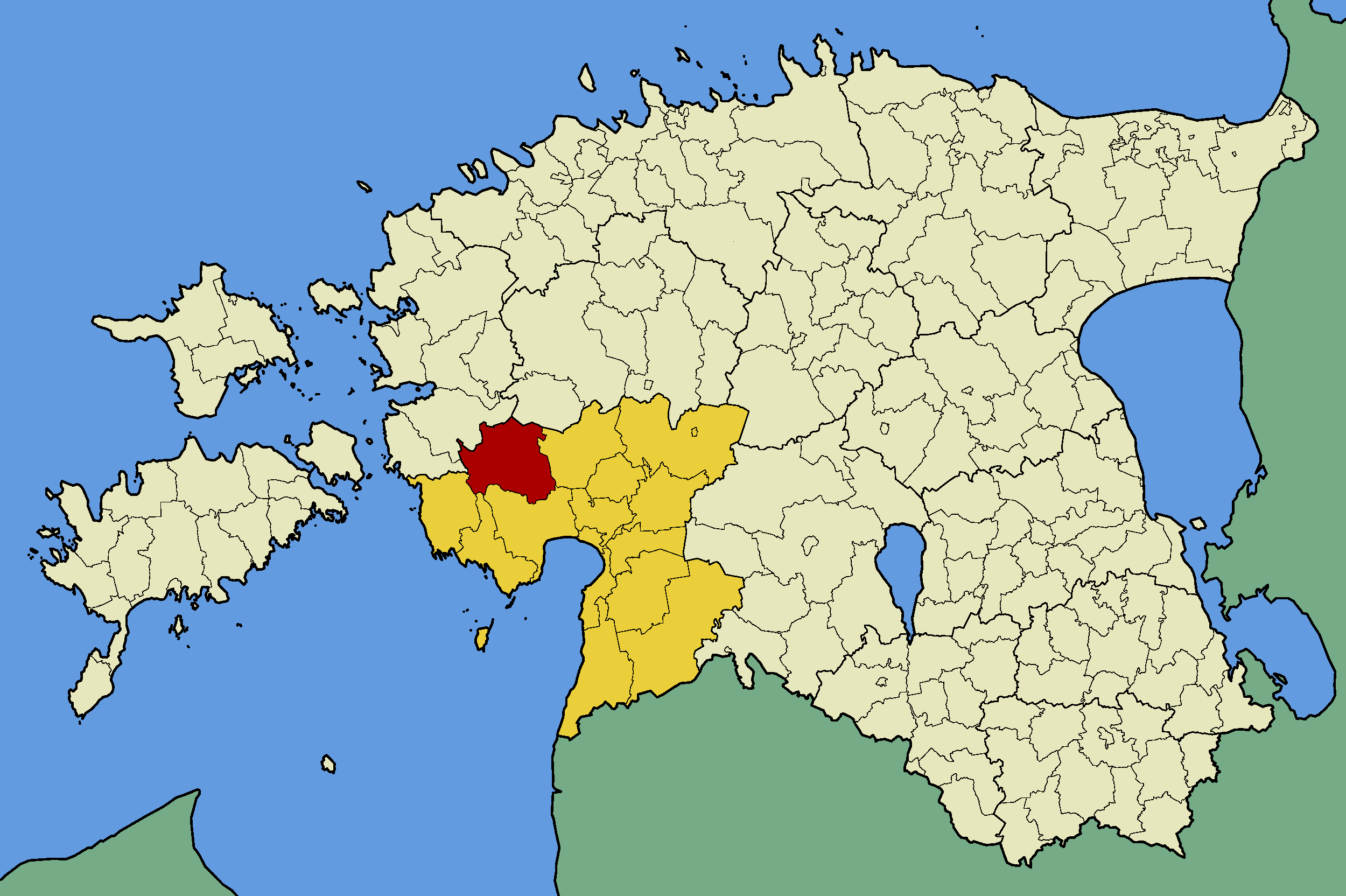
- Koonga Parish within Pärnu County.
- Country: Estonia
- County: Pärnu County
- Administrative centre: Koonga

Area
  - Total: 438 km^{2} (169 sq mi)

Population (01.01.2010)
  - Total: 1,260
  - Density: 2.88/km^{2} (7.45/sq mi)
- Website: www.koongavald.ee

Koonga was a municipality located in Pärnu County, one of the 15 counties of Estonia. In 2017, Koonga Parish, Hanila Parish, Lihula Parish, and Varbla Parish were merged to form Lääneranna Parish. It is one of the oldest known human settlements in Estonia.

== Villages ==
- Emmu
- Hõbeda
- Irta
- Iska
- Jänistvere
- Järve
- Joonuse
- Kalli
- Karinõmme
- Karuba
- Kibura
- Kiisamaa
- Kõima
- Koonga
- Kuhu
- Kurese
- Lõpe
- Maikse
- Mihkli
- Naissoo
- Nätsi
- Nedrema
- Õepa
- Oidrema
- Paimvere
- Palatu
- Parasmaa
- Peantse
- Piisu
- Pikavere
- Rabavere
- Salavere
- Sookatse
- Tamme
- Tarva
- Tõitse
- Ura
- Urita
- Vastaba
- Veltsa
- Võitra
- Võrungi
