= Jaagup Loosalu =

Estonian politician

Jaagup Loosalu (also Jakob Loosalu, born Jakob Veide; 1 January 1898 Aleksandri Parish (now Kose Parish), Kreis Harrien – 5 May 1996 Pärnu) was an Estonian publisher, journalist, agricultural scientist and politician. He was a member of III Riigikogu.
