= Wooded meadow =

Ecosystem in temperate forest regions

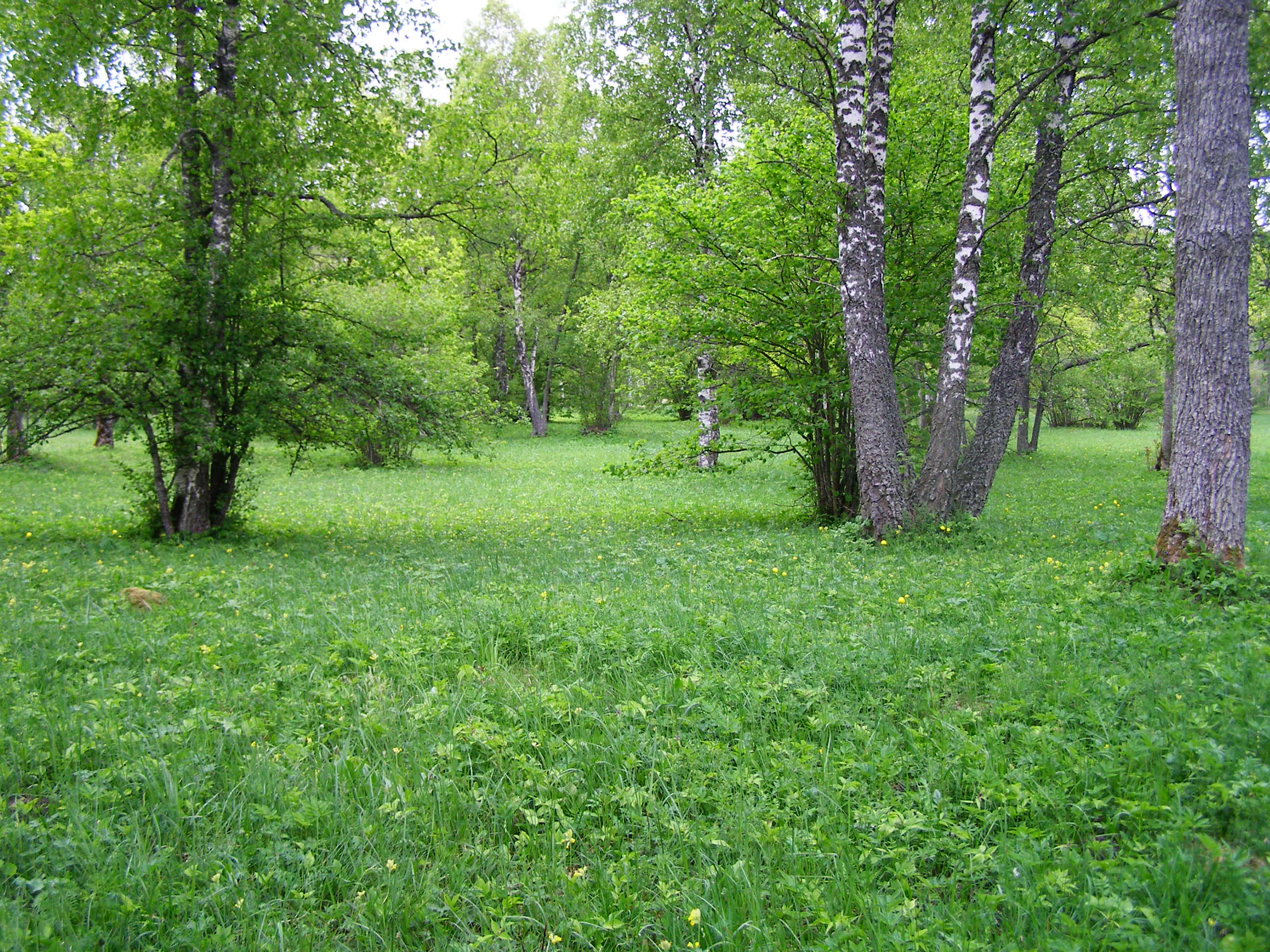
Laelatu wooded meadow, Estonia.

Wooded meadows (also named wood-meadows, park meadows, etc.) are ecosystems in temperate forest regions. They are sparse natural stands with a regularly mowed herbaceous layer.

While frequent throughout Europe during the Medieval period and before, wooded meadows have largely disappeared. Wooded meadows originated with the practices of hunter-gatherer communities. They were important in terms of social organization around a natural resource and determined much of the community's interactions with the natural world. In the early 20th century, wooded meadows were used for fruit cultivation in Sweden; however, their prevalence has decreased substantially due to changes in land management and a movement toward more intensive types of agroecosystems. The more typical, calcicolous wooded meadows are common around the Baltic Sea.

Wooded meadows have high species richness. In some of the current Estonian wooded meadows, world-record species densities have been recorded (up to 76 species of vascular plants per square meter).

== Literature ==
- Kull, Kalevi; Kukk, Toomas; Lotman, Aleksei 2003. When culture supports biodiversity: The case of wooded meadow. In: Roepstorff, Andreas; Bubandt, Nils; Kull, Kalevi (eds.) 2003. Imagining Nature: Practices of Cosmology and Identity. Aarhus: Aarhus University Press, 76–96. (pdf)
