= Karl Ast =

Estonian writer and politician

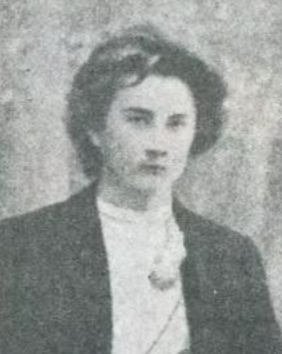
- Karl Ast in a photo first published in 1905, from a 1936 book
- Born: February 19, 1886; Orava, Kreis Werro, Governorate of Livonia
- Died: July 9, 1971 (aged 85); New York City
- Other name: Karl Rumor
- Occupations: writer, politician

Karl Ast (pseudonym: Karl Rumor, 19 February 1886 – 9 July 1971) was an Estonian writer and politician.

== Life ==
Ast's older brother, Gottlieb Ast, was the mayor of Tallinn in 1919. Karl attended the renowned Hugo Treffner Gymnasium in Tartu. Ast supported the Russian Revolution of 1905 and was imprisoned in Riga for a period from 1907 to 1910 as a result of his criticism of the authoritarian regime of the Tsar. He participated in the First World War in the Russian Imperial Army.

With the attainment of independence of the Republic of Estonia, Karl Ast entered politics. He was a member of the Estonian Constituent Assembly in 1919. From 1919 to 1933 he was a member of the Estonian Parliament (Riigikogu). Between 1933 and 1939 he traveled the world (including the capitals of Europe, North Africa, India, Japan, China) and had written numerous travel accounts and reports. In 1939 he was Estonian press attaché in Sweden.

During the Second World War, Karl Ast emigrated from Europe, settling in Brazil, then in Canada and eventually in the U.S. He served with the Estonian government in exile until 1959.

== Literary work ==
Karl Ast's literary debut came in 1911, shortly after his release from Tzarist imprisonment with the short story collection Sääsed tormis (The mosquitoes in the storm). In 1923/24 he was chairman of the Estonian Writers' Union. In addition to numerous short stories he wrote a novel (Krutsifiks, 1960), two volumes of memoirs and numerous travel books. His short stories made him one of the most popular exile writers of his time.

=== Bibliography ===
- Sääsed tormis (1911, short stories and sketches)
- Lumiste kõrguste poole (1913, prose poem)
- Tuled sügis-öös (1913, short stories)
- Tiibuse Jaagu kojutulek: traagikomöödia 1 vaatuses (1920, under the pseudonym Kaarlo Orawa)
- Siiruviiruline: novellid ja vested (1921, short stories)
- Mürgine vili. Sõja ja revolutsiooni novellid (1926, short stories)
- Sammud kaduvikku' (1928, short stories)
- Valge naine: romantiline draama kolmes vaatuses (1928, romantic drama)
- Kui Saara naerab (1929, erotic short stories)
- Palava päikese ja fanaatilise usu maal: reisukirjad Tseilonist ja Indiast (1930/31, travel reports)
- Allah ja ta rahvas: tähelepanekuid ja elamusi Marokos (1936, travelogue)
- Kahe tule vahel (1943, a political treatise)
- Uned ja mured (1953, short stories)
- Kuldlind (1959, short stories)
- Krutsifiks. Jutustus inimhingede põuast ja põlemisest (1960, novel)
- Tuuleviiul (1962, short stories)
- Aegade sadestus (1963–65, memories, two volumes)
- Liivakella all (1971, short stories)
- Peeglite vahel (1991, short stories)
- Põlevad laevad (1995, story)
- Maailma lõpus (2007, essays, edited by Hando Runnel)
