= Left-wing Workers =

Estonian political party

Left-wing Workers Pahempoolsed töölised ja kehvikud
- Founded: 1932
- Dissolved: 1935
- Preceded by: Estonian Workers' Party
- Ideology: Communism; Marxism-Leninism
- Political position: Far-left
- Colours: Red

The Left-wing Workers (Estonian: Pahempoolsed töölised ja kehvikud) was a political party in Estonia.

== History ==
The party was a front for the Communist Party, which had used umbrella organisations to participate in politics since being banned in 1918. In the 1932 elections it won five seats, a decrease on the six seats the Communists had won in the 1929 elections running under the guise of the Estonian Workers' Party.

Along with all others, the party was banned in 1935 following Konstantin Päts's self-coup.
