= Mihkel Martna =

Estonian politician and journalist

Mihkel Martna (17 September 1860 Veltsa parish, Paimpere – 23 May 1934 Tallinn) was an Estonian politician and journalist.

Martna was born in Kreis Wiek in the Governorate of Estonia (in present-day Pärnu County) and studied in a local village school. Thereafter, he worked as country labourer before going to Tallinn in order to become house painter. At this period, he became acquainted with the European workers' movement, socialism and Marxism. As he was one of the first Estonians to be active in this field, he came to be called "the father of Estonian social democracy". As a young man, he was also active in Estonian national movement, publishing articles in Postimees and Sakala and collecting folklore material.

Mihkel Martna disseminated socialist ideas in Tallinn, at the end 1880s he lived in Tartu and tried to influence students there. He later came into conflict with Peeter Speek and other Tartu socialists and moved back to Tallinn. Martna took part in the 1905 Russian revolution and had to live in exile from 1906 to 1917 (mostly in Switzerland, Germany, Finland).

At the beginning of 1918, Martna, having become familiar with the life in independent Finland, decided to support and promote Estonia's independence. He soon formed together with fellow thinkers the Estonian Socialist Workers' Party (Eesti Sotsiaaldemokraatiline Töölistepartei) and became later the leader of the party's left wing.

Martna also belonged to Estonia's foreign delegations. Together with Jaan Tõnisson and Karl Menning, Martna formed the board of the foreign delegation and he was the first representative of Estonia in Germany (1919).

Martna was member of the Estonian Provincial Assembly, the Estonian Constituent Assembly and Riigikogu (I to IV). 1929–1934 Martna was a vice-chairman of Riigikogu. Martna was one of the central figures in determining the political life of the Republic of Estonia, he was also a leading theoretician of the Estonian Socialist Workers' Party. In 1919, he gained Socialist Workers' International's recognition of Estonia's independence.

== Awards and recognitions ==
- Honorary doctor of the University of Tartu, 1930.
