= Estonian Workers' Party =

Political party in Estonia

Estonian Workers' Party Eesti Tööliste Partei
- Founded: 1926
- Dissolved: 1930
- Preceded by: Workers' United Front
- Succeeded by: Left-wing Workers
- Ideology: Communism; Marxism-Leninism
- Political position: Far-left
- Colours: Red

The Estonian Workers' Party (Estonian: Eesti Tööliste Partei) was a political party in Estonia.

== History ==
The party was a front for the Communist Party, which had used umbrella organisations to participate in politics since being banned in 1918. In the 1926 elections the party won six seats, a decrease on the ten seats the Communists won in the 1923 elections running under the guise of the Workers' United Front.

The 1929 elections saw the party retain its six seats. For the 1932 elections the Communists ran as the Left-wing Workers.
