= Wierland County =

Uyezd in Estonia Governorate, Russian Empire

Coordinates: 59°24′N 26°25′E

Wierland County Везенбергскій уѣздъ
- Uezd
- Location in the Governorate of Estonia
- Country: Russian Empire
- Governorate: Estonia
- Established: 1745
- Abolished: 1917
- Capital: Wesenberg

Area
  - Total: 6,939.33 km^{2} (2,679.29 sq mi)

Population (1897)
  - Total: 120,230
  - Density: 17.326/km^{2} (44.874/sq mi)

Wierland County (German: Kreis Wierland or Wierlandischer Kreis, Estonian: Viru kreis, Russian: Vezenbergsky uyezd, Russian: Везенбергскій/Вирляндскій уѣздъ, romanized: Vesenbergskiy/Virlyandskiy uyezd) was one of the four counties of the Russian Empire located in the Governorate of Estonia. It was situated in the eastern part of the governorate (in present-day northeastern Estonia). Its capital was Rakvere (Wesenberg). The territory of Wierland County corresponds to most parts of present-day Ida-Viru and Lääne-Viru counties and a small part of Jõgeva County.

== Demographics ==
At the time of the Russian Empire Census of 1897, Wierland County had a population of 120, 230. Of these, 90.3% spoke Estonian, 7.2% Russian, 1.9% German, 0.1% Polish, 0.1% Yiddish, 0.1% Latvian and 0.1% Finnish as their native language.
