= 5th Riigikogu =

Parliament of Estonia 1932–1934

The 5th Riigikogu was the fifth legislature of the Estonian Parliament (Riigikogu). The legislature was elected after the 1932 elections (held on 21–23 May 1932). It sat between 15 June 1932 and 2 October 1934, when its activities were suspended. The session formally ended on 31 December 1937.

== Officers ==
=== Chairman ===
- 20.06.1932–19.07.1932: Karl Eenpalu
- 19.07.1932–18.05.1933: Jaan Tõnisson
- 18.05.1933–29.08.1934: Karl Eenpalu
- 28.09.1934–31.12.1937: Rudolf Penno

=== First Assistant Chairman ===
- 20.06.1932–19.07.1932: Tõnis Kalbus
- 19.07.1932–01.12.1933: Jaan Soots
- 01.12.1933–28.09.1934: Rudolf Penno

=== Second Assistant Chairman ===
- 20.06.1932–04.10.1933: Mihkel Martna
- 04.10.1933–02.10.1934: Karl Ast
- 02.10.1934–31.12.1937: Leopold Johannes Johanson

=== Secretary ===
- 20.06.1932–31.12.1937: Jaagup Loosalu

=== First Assistant Secretary ===
- 20.06.1932–31.12.1937: August Tõllasepp

=== Second Assistant Secretary ===
- 20.06.1932–31.12.1937: Oskar Gustavson
