= 4th Riigikogu =

Parliament of Estonia 1929–1932

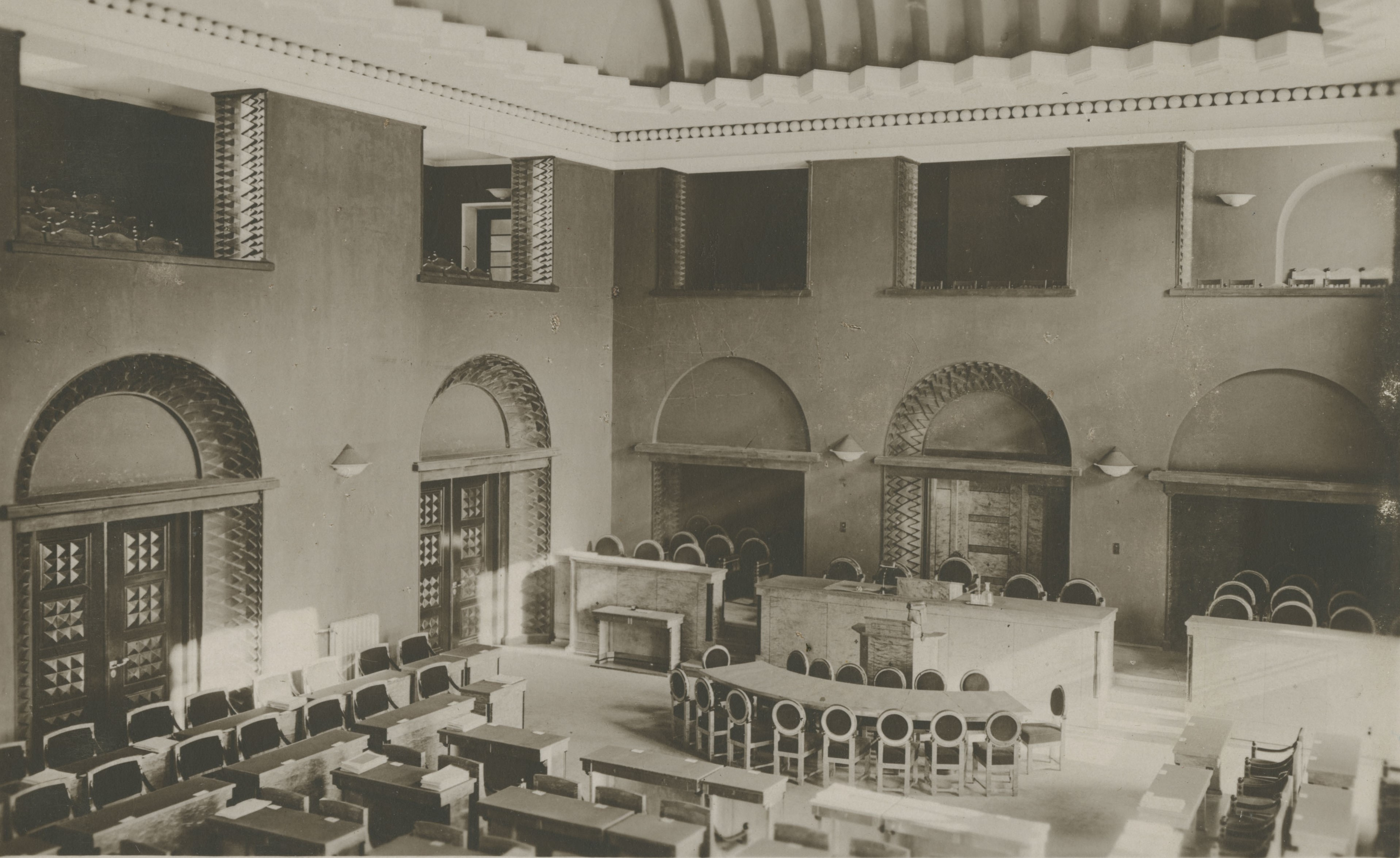
Riigikogu legislature hall in the 1920s

The 4th Riigikogu was the fourth legislature of the Estonian Parliament (Riigikogu). The legislature was elected after 1929 elections (held on 11–13 May 1929). It sat between 15 June 1929 and 14 June 1932, before the next round of elections were held.

== Officers ==
The following is a list of the Riigikogu's officers during the fourth legislative session:

=== Chairman ===
- Kaarel Eenpalu, from 02.07.1929

=== First Assistant Chairman ===
- Mihkel Martna, from 02.07.1929

=== Second Assistant Chairman ===
- Rudolf Penno, from 02.07.1929

=== Secretary ===
- Arnold Paul Schulbach, from 02.07.1929

=== First Assistant Secretary ===
- August Tõllasepp, from 02.07.1929

=== Second Assistant Secretary ===
- Jaan Piiskar, 02.07.1929 – 13.03.1930
- Oskar Gustavson, from 13.03.1930
