= County Governors of Estonia =

The Governor (Estonian: maavanem) was the leader of a county (maakond) in Estonia. Here is the list of governors of Estonian counties.

== Harju County ==
- Johannes Reinthal (1917–1920)
- Oskar Suursööt (1920–1922)
- Martin Kruusimaa (Krusemann) (1922–1927)
- Rudolf Kuris (1927–1936)
- Karl Robert Ruus (1936–1940)
- Gustav Abel (1940–1941)
- Paul Männik (1940; 1941–1944)
- Anti Oidsalu (1990–1991)
- Mati Zernand (1991–1994)
- Mait Kornet (1994–1999)
- Orm Valtson (1999–2004)
- Jaan Mark (acting, 2005–2006)
- Värner Lootsmann (2006–2009)
- Ülle Rajasalu (2009–2017)

== Hiiu County ==
- Tarmo Mänd (1989–1994)
- Tiit Laja (1994–1999)
- Hannes Maasel (1999–2012)
- Piret Sedrik (acting, 2012)
- Riho Rahuoja (2012–2017)

== Ida-Viru County ==
- ?
- Rein Aidma (1994–2003)
- Ago Silde (2004–2007)
- Riho Breivel (2007–2012)
- Andres Noormägi (2013–2017)

== Järva County ==
- Jakob Sõnajalg (1919–1935)
- Juhan Kaarlimäe (1937–1940)
- Herman Lipp (1941–1944)
- Arvo Sarapuu (1989–1997)
- Theo Aasa (1998–2003)
- Üllar Vahtramäe (2004–2009)
- Tiina Oraste (2009–2017)

== Jõgeva County ==
- Priit Saksing (1990–1994)
- Meelis Paavel (1994–1999)
- Margus Oro (1999–2004)
- Aivar Kokk (2004–2009)
- Viktor Svjatõšev (2009–2017)

== Lääne County ==
- Aleksander Saar (1917–1927)
- Artur Kasterpalu (1930–1941)
- Karl Robert Ruus (1941–1944)
- Andres Lipstok (1989–1994)
- Hannes Danilov (1994–1999)
- Arder Väli (1999)
- Maaja Toompuu (acting, 1999)
- Jaanus Sahk (1999–2004)
- Sulev Vare (2004–2007)
- Maaja Toompuu (acting, 2007–2008)
- Neeme Suur (2008–2011)
- Innar Mäesalu (2011–2017)

== Lääne-Viru County ==
- Lembit Kaljuvee (1989–1992)
- Ants Leemets (1992–1995)
- Marko Pomerants (1995–2003)
- Riina Kaptein (acting, 2003–2004)
- Urmas Tamm (2004–2009)
- Einar Vallbaum (2009–2017)

== Pärnu County ==
- Jüri Marksoo (1920–1940)
- Rein Kirs (?–1993)
- Toomas Kivimägi (1993–2009)
- Andres Metsoja (2009–2017)

== Põlva County ==
- Margus Leivo (1990–1993)
- ? (1993–1996)
- Kalev Kreegipuu (1996–1998)
- Mart Madissoon (1998–2003)
- Urmas Klaas (2004–2007)
- Priit Sibul (2007–2011)
- Ulla Preeden (2011–2017)

== Rapla County ==
- Harri Õunapuu (1989–1991)
- Kalle Talviste (1991–2003)
- Tõnis Blank (2004–2009)
- Tiit Leier (2009–2017)

== Saare County ==
- Ants Tammleht (1990–1991)
- Jüri Saar (1992–2003)
- Hans Teiv (acting, 2003–2006)
- Toomas Kasemaa (2006–2011)
- Jaan Leivategija (acting, 2011)
- Kaido Kaasik (2011–2017)

== Tartu County ==
- Bernhard Methusalem (1944)
- Robert Närska (1989–1992)
- Kalju Koha (1992–1993)
- Jaan Õunapuu (1993–2003)
- Eha Pärn (acting, 2003–2004)
- Eha Pärn (2004–2005)
- Tõnu Vesi (acting, 2005–2006)
- Esta Tamm (2006–2011)
- Tõnu Vesi (acting, 2011)
- Reno Laidre (2011–2017)

== Valga County ==
- Karl Robert Ruus (1930–1933)
- Värdi Velner (1936–1940)
- Värdi Velner (1941–1943)
- Uno Heinla (1989–1992)
- Rein Randver (1992–2003)
- Georg Trašanov (2003–2010)
- Margus Lepik (2010–2017)

== Viljandi County ==
- ?
- Helir-Valdor Seeder (1993–2003)
- Kalle Küttis (2004–2009)
- Lembit Kruuse (2009–2017)

== Võru County ==
- ? (?–1993)
- Tiit Soosaar (1993–1998)
- Robert Lepikson (1998–2000)
- Mait Klaassen (2000–2004)
- Ülo Tulik (2005–2010)
- Andres Kõiv (2010–2017)
