= Hannes =

- Gender: Male

Origin
- Region of origin: Austria, Belgium, Estonia, Finland, Germany, Iceland, Netherlands, Norway, Sweden

Other names
- Related names: Johannes, Johan, Jan, Jaan, Juhan, Juho, John, Hans, Hanno

Hannes is a male given name and a short form or diminutive of Johannes or Hannibal.

Hannes may refer to:

- Hannes Alfvén (1908–1995), Swedish chemist and Nobel-prize winner
- Hannes Aigner (born 1989), German slalom canoeist and Olympic medalist
- Hannes Androsch (born 1938), Austrian entrepreneur, consultant, politician and former Austrian Vice Chancellor
- Hannes Anier (born 1993), Estonian footballer
- Hannes Arch (born 1967), Austrian pilot
- Hannes van Asseldonk (born 1992), Dutch racing driver
- Hannes Astok (born 1964), Estonian journalist, radio presenter and politician
- Hannes Bauer (1954–2016), German trombonist and jazz musician
- Hannes Baumann (born 1982), German sailor and Olympic competitor
- Hannes de Boer (1899–1982), Dutch long jumper and Olympic competitor
- Hannes Bok (1914–1964), American artist and writer
- Hannes Brewis (1930–2007), South African rugby player
- Hannes van der Bruggen (born 1993), Belgian footballer
- Hannes Coetzee (born 1944), South African guitarist
- Hannes Van Dahl (born 1990), Swedish drummer (Sabaton)
- Hannes Dotzler (born 1990), German cross country skier
- Hannes Dreyer (born 1985), South African sprinter and Olympic competitor
- Hannes Eder (born 1983), Austrian footballer
- Hannes Franklin (born 1981), South African rugby player
- Hannes Fuchs (born 1972), Austrian badminton player and Olympic competitor
- Hannes Germann (born 1956), Swiss politician
- Hannes Hólmsteinn Gissurarson (born 1953), Icelandic political science professor and commentator
- Hannes Grossmann (born 1982), German drummer (Obscura)
- Hannes Hafstein (1861–1922), Icelandic poet and politician, former Prime Minister of Iceland
- Hannes Halldórsson (born 1984), Icelandic footballer
- Hannes Heer (born 1941), German historian
- Hannes Hegen (1925–2014), German illustrator and caricaturist
- Hannes Holm (born 1962), Swedish director and screenwriter
- Hannes Hopley (born 1981), South African discus thrower and Olympic competitor
- Hannes Hyvönen (born 1975), Finnish ice hockey player
- Hannes Ignatius (1871–1941), Finnish soldier
- Hannes Jaenicke (born 1960), German film and television actor
- Hannes Stefánsson (born 1972), Icelandic chess Grandmaster
- Hannes Kaasik (born 1978), Estonian football referee
- Hannes Kaljujärv (born 1957), Estonian actor
- Hannes Keller (1934–2022), Swiss physicist, mathematician, deep diving pioneer, and entrepreneur
- Hannes Koenig (born 2001), German gymnast
- Hannes Kolehmainen (1889–1966), Finnish Finnish long-distance runner and Olympic medalist
- Hannes Koivunen (1911–1990), Finnish boxer and Olympic competitor
- Hannes Lembacher (born 1954), Austrian fencer and Olympic competitor
- Hannes Lindemann (1922–2015), German doctor, navigator and sailor
- Hannes Linßen (born 1949), German football player and manager
- Hannes Lintl (1924–2003), Austrian architect
- Hannes Löhr (1942–2016), German footballer
- Hannes Maasel (born 1951), Estonian politician
- Hannes Manninen (born 1946), Finnish politician
- Hannes Marais (born 1941), South African rugby player
- Hannes Messemer (1924–1991), German film actor
- Hannes Meyer (1889–1954), Swiss architect
- Hannes Nikel (1931–2001), German film editor
- Hannes Orlamünder (born 1999), German luger
- Hannes Peckolt (born 1982), German sailor and Olympic medalist
- Hannes Pétursson (born 1931), Icelandic poet and writer
- Hannes Pichler, (born ????), Italian luger and Olympic competitor
- Hannes Råstam (1956–2012), Swedish journalist and television presenter
- Hannes Reichelt (born 1980), Austrian alpine ski racer and Olympic competitor
- Hannes Reinmayr (born 1969), Austrian footballer and trainer
- Hannes Rossacher (born 1952), Austrian film director and producer
- Hannes Paul Schmid (born 1980), Italian alpine skier and Olympic competitor
- Hannes Schneider (1890–1955), Austrian ski instructor
- Hannes Sigurðsson (born 1983), Icelandic footballer
- Hannes Sköld (1886–1930), Swedish socialist, anti-militarist, poet and linguist
- Hannes Smárason (born 1967), Icelandic businessman
- Hannes Smith (1933–2008), Namibian journalist, editor and publisher
- Hannes Soomer (born 1998), Estonian motorcycle racer
- Hannes Stiller (born 1978), Swedish footballer
- Hannes Strydom (born 1965), South African rugby player
- Hannes Sula (1894–1955), Finnish-Canadian revolutionary and journalist
- Hannes Swoboda (born 1946), Austrian politician
- Hannes Taljaard (born 1971), South African classical music composer
- Hannes Torpo (1901–1980), Finnish track and field athlete and Olympic competitor
- Hannes Trautloft (1912–1995), German World War II fighter ace
- Hannes Tretter (1951–2025), Austrian lawyer and human rights expert
- Hannes Trinkl (born 1968), Austrian alpine skier and Olympic medalist
- Hannes Võrno (born 1969), Estonian comedian, politician and fashion designer
- Hannes Wader (born 1942), German singer-songwriter
- Hannes Walter (historian) (1952–2004), Estonian war historian
- Hannes Winklbauer (born 1949), Austrian footballer and coach
- Hannes Woivalin (born 2002), Finnish footballer
- Hannes Zehentner (born 1965), German alpine skier and Olympic competitor

== Fictional characters ==
- Hannes (Attack on Titan), a character in the manga series Attack on Titan
