= Siiri Vallner =

Estonian architect

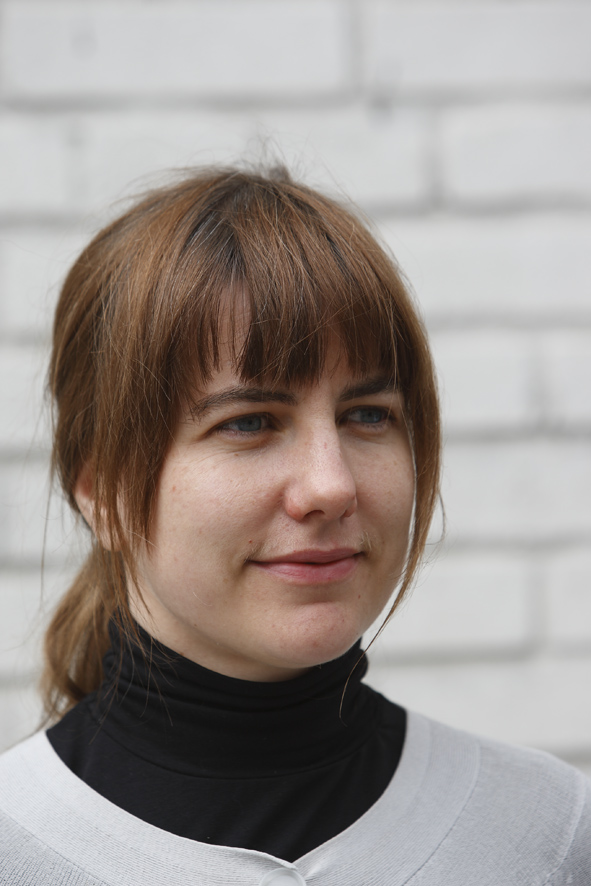
Siiri Vallner (2009): Born / 'Siiri Vallner'; Birthday / April 9, 1972 (aged 49); Birth Place / Tallinn, Estonia; Education / Estonian Academy of Arts Virginia Polytechnic Institute and State University; Occupation / Architect; Architecture Firms / Berzak & Gold P.C. Lewis & Associates Ltd. Kavakava Head Arhitektid OÜ

Siiri Vallner (born April 9, 1972) is an industrious Estonian architect. She works mostly in community projects, as well as in many competitions. She is a member of the Union of Estonian Architects.

== Biography ==
Born in Tallinn, Estonia, she spent a lot of her childhood going to work with her parents, surrounded by technology. Her parents worked in IT during the time of the Soviet Union, picking up personal projects after their normal work hours.

As a teenager recently graduating high school, she was opposed to many of her options of a career. Though she graduated from a high school specializing in sciences, she was not interested in pursuing math as a career. This left her with architecture. She got into, and studied at the Estonian Academy of Arts in the architecture department, graduating in 1997. From 1998 to 1999 she studied in the Virginia Polytechnic Institute and State University.

Following her Graduating from Virginia Polytechnic Institute and State University, she worked at architecture firms Berzak & Gold P.C. in New York and Lewis & Associates Ltd. in Alexandria, Virginia. After returning to Estonia in 2002, she founded Kavakava with, Katrin Koov and Kaire Nōmm, and Head Arhitektid Oü, with Indrek Peil.

== Projects ==
Projects
PROJECT	LOCATION	YEAR	OTHER ARCHITECTS ASSOCIATED
Lasnamäe track and field center	Tallinn, Estonia	2003	Hanno Grossschmidt and Tomomi Hayashi
Vabamu Museum of Occupations and Freedom	Tallinn, Estonia	2003	Indrek Peil, Tomomi Hayashi, and Toomas Kuslap
Rakvere Stairs	Rakvere, Estonia	2005	Heidi Urb
Pärnu city center sports hall	Pärnu, Estonia	2005	Katrin Koov, Kaire Nõmm, Heidi Urb
Villa Lokaator	Paldiski, Estonia	2007	Indrek Peil
Lotte Kindergarten	Tartu, Estonia	2008	Indrek Peil and Sten Mark Mändmaa
Culture Cauldron	Tallinn, Estonia	2009	Indrek Peil (team Katrin Koov, Kadri Klementi, Andro Mänd, Sten-Mark Mändmaa, Ragnar Põllukivi, Triin Maripuu, Ivan Sergejev, Elen Paddar, Martin J. Navarro Gonzalez)
Tartu Health Care College	Tartu, Estonia	2011	Indrek Peil (team Johannes Feld, Andro Mänd, Sten Mark Mändmaa, Ragnar Põllukivi)
The Pier	Tallinn, Estonia	2011	Indrek Peil
Kuressaare Children's Home	Kuressaare, Estonia	2014	Katrin Koov and Kaire Nõmm (Ragnar Põllukivi, Reedik Poopuu)
Shelter – short-term accommodation units	Tallinn, Estonia	2012	Indrek Peil and Kaire Nõmm (Kadri Klementi, Andro Mänd, Sten Mark Mändmaa, Ragnar Põllukivi)
University of Tartu Narva College	Narva, Estonia	2012	Indrek Peil and Katrin Koov (team Heidi Urb, Maarja Tüür, Andro Mänd, Sten Mark Mändmaa, Helina Lass)
Raua sauna	Tallinn, Estonia	2013	Indrek Peil and Ragnar Põllukivi
Tallinn new center (ongoing, in stage I)	Tallinn, Estonia	2016	Indrek Peil, Kristel Niisuke (Kavakava), Toomas Paaver (Linnalahendused), Renee Puusepp (Slider Studio)
Fire Station type house	Vastseliina, Estonia	2018	Indrek Peil (Kristel Niisuke, Valdis Linde)

== Competitions and awards ==
Competitions
Competition	Year	Other Architects Associated	Placement
Europan 6 in Vienna	2001	N/A	II prize
Narva College of the University of Tartu	2005	Indrek Peil and Katrin Koov	I prize
Lotte kindergarten	2006	Indrek Peil	I prize
Visitors Center of the Estonian Open Air Museum	2007	Indrek Peil	I prize
Viljandi College, University of Tartu	2008	Indrek Peil, Heidi Urb, Helina Lass, and Sten Mark Mändmaa	I prize
Tallinn Culture Factory	2009	Indrek Peil	I prize
Riverside Cafe	2011	Katrin Koov, Reedik Poopuu	I prize
Kuressaare Children’s Home	2012	Katrin Koov, Kaire Nõmm (Ragnar Põllukivi, Reedik Poopuu)	I prize
Kärdla Social Centre	2014	Indrek Peil	III prize
Arvo Pärt Centre	2014	Indrek Peil, Joel Kopli (Kuu), and Üllar Ambos	III prize
EV 100 Architecture Competition (City Square of Rapla)	2015	N/A	I prize
EV 100 Architecture Competition (City Square of Tõrva)	2015	Indrek Peil	III prize
City Square of Põlva	2015	Indrek Peil	IV prize
Wooden Prefab Element Home	2016	N/A	II... III prize
Tallinn’s New Main Street	2016	Toomas Paaver, Indrek Kustavus, Indrek Peil, Kristel Niisuke, Valdis Linde, and Riin-Kärt Ranne	I prize
Academy of Security Sciences	2016	Indrek Peil, Kristel Niisuke, Kristiina Way, Valdis Linde, and Riin-Kärt Ranne	II prize
Vana-Kalamaja street	2017	Indrek Peil and Kristel Niisuke	I prize
Tallinn Port Master Plan 2030	2017	Indrek Peil, Kristel Niisuke, and Üllar Ambos (Barbora Tauerova, Manuela Serreli, Sander Pallik, Anni Müüripeal)	Stage III
Viimsi School for Young Talents	2018	Indrek Peil, Kristel Niisuke, and Ko Ai	I prize
Orangerie	2018	Indrek Peil, Kristel Niisuke, Kristi Merilo, Karolina Tatar, and Špela Ščančar	II…III prize
Hotel in Parnu	2018	Indrek Peil, Helina Lass, Kristel Niisuke, and Üla Koppel	
Environment Building	2019	Indrek Peil, Kristel Niisuke, and Ko Ai	I prize

Awards
Award	Year	Other Architects Associated
Best Young Architect Award	2008	N/A
National Culture Award	2013	Indrek Peil, Katrin Koov, and interior architect Hannes Praks

== See also ==
- List of Estonian architects
- List of women architects
