= Occupation of Estonia =

Occupation of Estonia may refer to:

- Occupation of Estonia by the German Empire (February–November 1918)
- Soviet occupation of Estonia (June 1940 – July 1941 and February 1944 – August 1991)
- German occupation of Estonia during World War II (July 1941 – September 1944)
- Soviet re-occupation of the Baltic states (1944), including Estonia

== See also ==
- Baltic states under Soviet rule (1944–1991)
- German occupation of the Baltic states during World War II
- Occupation of the Baltic states
- Soviet occupation of the Baltic states (1940)
- Vabamu Museum of Occupations and Freedom
