= Soviet-occupied Estonia =

Soviet-occupied Estonia may refer to:

- Estonian Soviet Socialist Republic
- Soviet occupation of the Baltic states (1940), including Estonia
- Soviet re-occupation of the Baltic states (1944), including Estonia

== See also ==
- Baltic states under Soviet rule (1944–1991)
- German occupation of the Baltic states during World War II
- German occupation of Estonia during World War II
- Occupation of Estonia by Nazi Germany
- Occupation of the Baltic states
- Vabamu Museum of Occupations and Freedom
