= Innar =

Male given name

- Gender: Male
- Language: Estonian
- Name day: 11 March

Origin
- Region of origin: Estonia

Other names
- Related names: Inno

Innar is an Estonian masculine given name.

People named Innar include:

- Innar Mäesalu (born 1970), politician
- Innar Mändoja (born 1978), racing cyclist
