= Georg Trašanov =

Estonian politician (born 1954)

Georg Trašanov (born 18 November 1954) is an Estonian politician. 2003–2010 he served as the governor of Valga County.

In 2010 he was sentenced to prison for 4 years because of bribe-taking from the managing director of GoBus, Kalle Muru.

Political offices
| Preceded by Rein Randver | Governor of Valga County; 2003–2010 | Succeeded by Margus Lepik |
