= Pärnu Town Hall =

Town hall in Pärnu, Estonia

Coordinates: 58.3854°N 24.4992°E

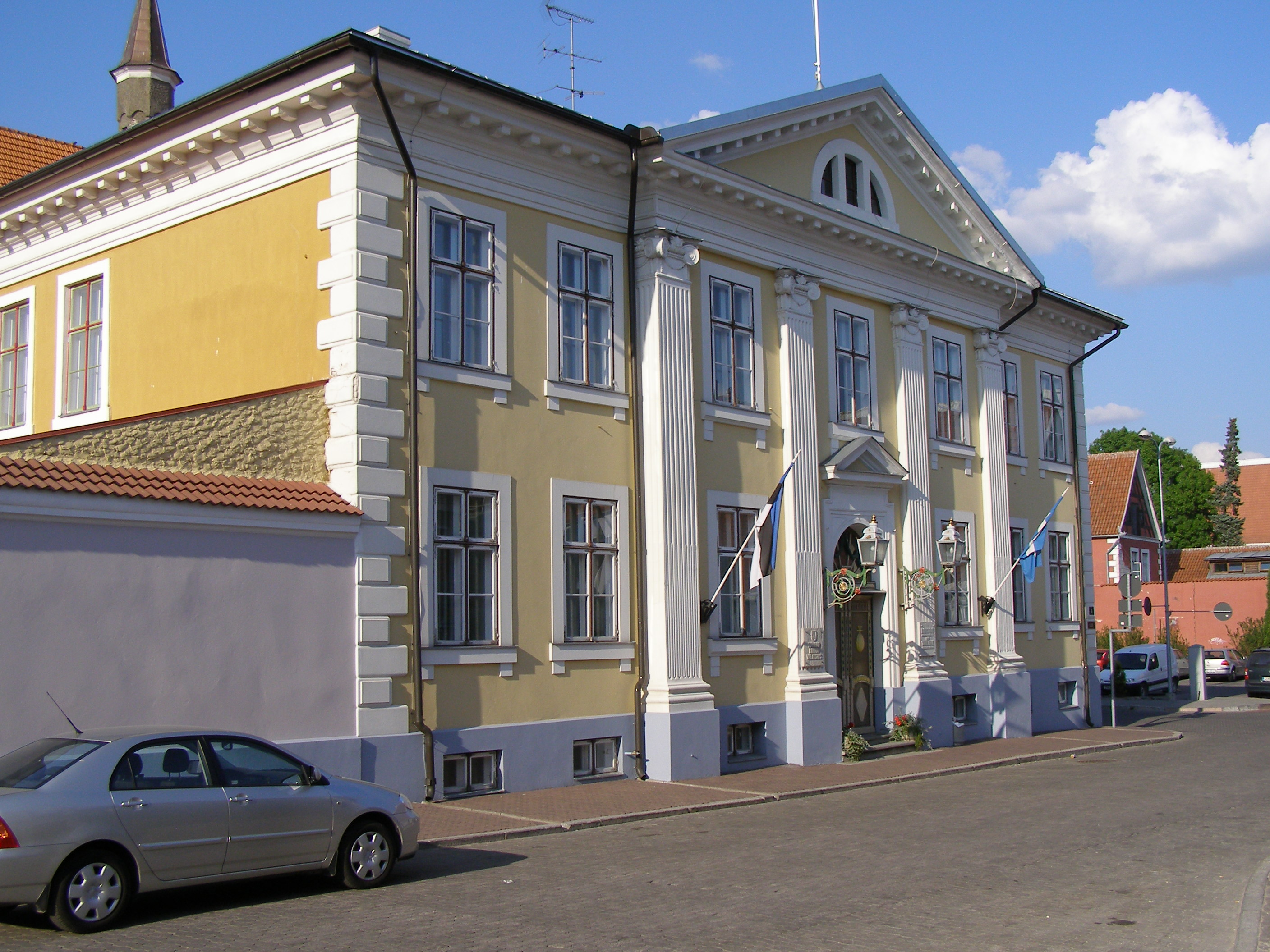
Pärnu Town Hall

Pärnu Town Hall (Estonian: Pärnu raekoda) is a building in Pärnu, Estonia.

The building is composed of two parts: classicist part at Uus Street, and the annex, which was built in 1911.

The town council started to work in the building in 1839.

Nowadays, the building is used by Pärnu City Gallery, Pärny City Orchestra and Pärnu Visiting Centre.
