= Jaanus Tamkivi =

Estonian politician (born 1959)

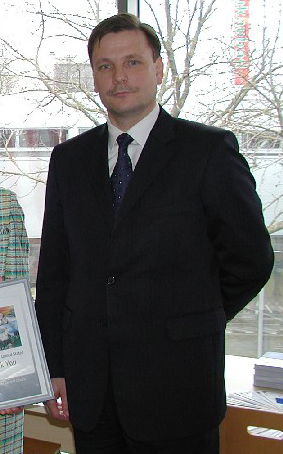
- Tamkivi in 2005

Minister of the Environment
- In office 2007–2011
- Prime Minister: Andrus Ansip
- Preceded by: Rein Randver
- Succeeded by: Keit Pentus

Personal details
- Born: 17 November 1959 (age 66) Kuressaare, then part of Estonian SSR, Soviet Union
- Party: Estonian Reform Party

Jaanus Tamkivi (born 17 November 1959) is an Estonian politician of the Estonian Reform Party. He was Mayor of Kuressaare from 1996 to 2005, a member of the Riigikogu from 2005 to 2015, and the Minister of the Environment from 2007 to 2011. Currently he is the chairman of Saaremaa Municipality Council.

Political offices
Preceded by ?	Mayor of Kuressaare; 1996–2005	Succeeded by Urmas Treiel
Preceded by Rein Randver	Minister of the Environment; 2007–2011	Succeeded by Keit Pentus
