= Paavel =

Paavel is an Estonian surname. Notable people with the surname include:

- Ageeda Paavel (1930–2023), Estonian freedom fighter of military merit
- Meelis Paavel (born 1963), Estonian geographer and politician

== See also ==
- Paavela
