= Ülle Rajasalu =

Estonian politician

Ülle Rajasalu (born 6 May 1953) is an Estonian politician. From 1999 to 2004, she was an Elder of the Pirita District, Tallinn. She became the governor of Harju County in 2009.

== Sources ==
- (Estonian)

Political offices
Preceded by Monika Salu	Elder of Pirita District, Tallinn; 1999–2004	Succeeded by Enno Tamm
Preceded by Värner Lootsmann	Governor of Harju County; 2009–present	Succeeded by Incumbent
