= Tomomi Hayashi =

Japanese-Estonian architect

Tomomi Hayashi (林 知充, born February 1, 1971, in Toyama, Japan) is a Japanese-Estonian architect.

From 1990 to 1994 Tomomi Hayashi studied in the Yokohama National University (横浜国立大学 Yokohama Kokuritsu Daigaku) in the department of architecture. From 1995 to 1999 he studied in the Virginia Polytechnic Institute and State University, at the Washington-Alexandria Architecture Center (WAAC).

From 1994 to 1995 Tomomi Hayashi worked in the Maki and Associates architectural bureau as an assistant. From 1999 to 2001 he worked in the Rafael Viñoly Architects architectural bureau. From 2001 to present he works in Estonia - from 2001 to 2003 in HEAD Arhitektid OÜ architectural office, in 2003 in KOSMOS OÜ architectural office and from 2004 to present in Hayashi-Grossschmidt Arhitektuur (HGA).

Most notable works of Tomomi Hayashi are the Lasnamäe track and field hall (2003), Museum of Occupations (2003), FOORUM department store (2007), the Rotermann's Old and New Flour Storage (reconstruction and extension of the Old Flour Storage in Rotermanni Quarter) (2009) as well as the renovation of Machinery Hall of the A. M. Lutheri Furniture Factory (2017). HGA was involved with the Estonian National Museum project from 2008 till its completion as the collaborating local architects. Tomomi Hayashi has received the annual architecture prize of the Cultural Endowment of Estonia in 2003 and 2009, and in 2017 architectural grand prize for the Estonian National Museum project. He was nominated for the Mies van der Rohe Prize in 2005, 2009 and 2019.

Recently received the Gold prize in the Work category for the IFI Design Distinction Award and Special Mentions in 2020 European Heritage Awards – Europa Nostra Awards for the renovation of Machinery Hall of the A. M. Lutheri Furniture Factory.

Since 2012 he has taught at TTK, Tallinn University of Applied Sciences. Between 2012 and 2017 lead the Institute of Architecture in Faculty of Architecture and Environmental Engineering. At the same institute he teaches as an associate professor (2016-2020) and then as a professor (2021-).

Tomomi Hayashi is a member of the Union of Estonian Architects and Chartered architect-expert VIII.

== Works ==
- 2021 Outdoor stage in Treski, Setomaa (with Jüri Nigulas)
- 2020 Exhibition Design for "Miracles in Concrete. August Komendant", Museum of Estonian Architecture (with Andrea Ainjärv)
- 2019 Noblessner Yacht Club and Noblessner Shipyard reconstruction, Tallinn (realised as Kai Art Centre, project complemented by KAOS Architects)
- 2017 Renovation of the Machinery Hall of A.M. Luther's Furniture Factory, Tallinn (with Hanno Grossschmidt, Liis Voksepp, Marianna Zvereva, Anna Endrikson, Jüri Nigulas, Andres Ristov, Sander Treijar)
- 2016 Estonian National Museum, Tartu (Author: DGT Architects, Paris / Local architects: HGA, Tallinn)
- 2014 Installation "Paper Library", Riga
- 2013 Floating Sauna, Türi
- 2013 Installation "A Stair for Tallinn Archicture Biennale", Tallinn
- 2011 BAUA exhibition booth in the 24th UIA Congress in Tokyo, “GLOBE” – Shape your future! (Curatorial work, Author: Mark Grimitliht)
- 2011 Installation “To the Sea” on the roof of the Tallinna Linnahall, Tallinn
- 2010 Musician's House in Tallinn (with Liis Voksepp)
- 2010 ADM Interactive office, Tallinn (with Kerli Valk, Ahti Grünberg)
- 2009 Rotermann's Old and New Flour Storage -Reconstruction and extension of the Old Flour Storage in the Rotermanni Quarter, Tallinn (with Hanno Grossschmidt, Yoko Azukawa)
- 2007 Foorum department store, Tallinn (with Hanno Grossschmidt)
- 2003 Lasnamäe Track and Field Centre, Tallinn (with Siiri Vallner, Hanno Grossschmidt)
- 2003 Museum of Occupations, Tallinn (with Siiri Vallner, Indrek Peil)
- 2003 David L. Lawrence Convention Center, Pittsburgh (with Rafael Vinóly Architects)

== Competitions ==
- 2022 Mixed-use building in Kopli Street; 1st place
- 2022 Extension of Tallinna Reaalkool (Tallinn Secondary School of Science); Honorable mention
- 2021 Planning of Narva mnt 172 residential quarter; 1st place
- 2021 Mixed-use building in Vesilennuki Street, 3rd place
- 2021 Lutheri Quarter's New Building; 1st place
- 2021 Planning of Mööblimaja quarter; 1st place
- 2021 Planning of Pärnu Valgre residential quarter; 1st place
- 2020 Vision of Patarei Sea Fortress; 1st place
- 2020 Merimetsa promenade; 1st place
- 2020 The Stroomi Beach House; 1st place
- 2020 The vision for the Hipodroomi Business Quarter; 1st place
- 2019 Viljandi's new hospital and health centre; Honourable mention
- 2017 The Commercial complex at Narva mnt 1 and Hobujaama 5, Tallinn - uniting the existing multiplex cinema and former central post office; 1st place
- 2017 Regeneration of the Tallinna Kaubamaja department store; 2nd place
- 2017 The vision for the Sepise Quarter vision, Tallinn; 1st place
- 2016 Pärnu Port Area planning; Honourable mention
- 2016 Vision for the Pirita Promenade complex, Tallinn; Shared 2nd and 3rd place
- 2015 Vision for the Salutaguse Manor Field; Shared 1st place
- 2013 Estonian Pavilion for the Expo 2015 in Milan; Honourable mention
- 2012 Estonian History Museum Maarjamäe Complex, 2012; 2nd place
- 2012 Extension of the Pärnu Sütevaka Humanitarian Gymnasium; 2nd place
- 2011 Apartment building complex in Kadriorg, Tallinn; 1st place
- 2010 Lift11 -Urban Installation Festival; entry selected for realisation
- 2007 New building of the Estonian Public Broadcasting company; 4th place
- 2005 Reconstruction and extension of the Old Flour Storage in the Rotermanni Quarter; 1st place
- 2005 Mahtra Peasant Museum; 1st place
- 2002 Hotel in Paadi Street; 1st place

== Awards ==
- 2022 Annual Wood Awards of the Estonian Forest and Wood Industries Association, Honorable mention: Outdoor stage in Treski, Setomaa
- 2020 Annual architecture prize of the Cultural Endowment of Estonia: "Exhibition Award": Exhibition “Miracles in Concrete. Structural Engineer August Komendant”
- 2020 European Heritage Awards – Europa Nostra Awards; Special mentions — The renovation of Machinery Hall of the A. M. Lutheri Furniture Factory
- 2020 IFI Design Distinction Award; Gold prize, Work category — The renovation of Machinery Hall of the A. M. Lutheri Furniture Factory
- 2018 Annual Prize of the Estonian Association of Interior Architects — The renovation of Machinery Hall of the A. M. Lutheri Furniture Factory
- 2018 Wood Awards from the Estonian Forest and Wood Industries Association; Special Prize for Plywood Construction — The renovation of Machinery Hall of the A. M. Lutheri Furniture Factory
- 2017 Excellent restoration work and interior design of the year from the Urban Planning Department of Tallinn — The renovation of Machinery Hall of the A. M. Lutheri Furniture Factory
- 2017 Special Award from Estonian Union of Concrete — The renovation of Machinery Hall of the A. M. Lutheri Furniture Factory
- 2017 Annual Architectural Prize from the Estonian Culture Endowment — The Estonian National Museum
- 2017 Annual Architectural Prize from the Union of the Estonian architects — The Estonian National Museum
- 2016 Wood Award from the Estonian Forest and Wood Industries Association; Special Prize for Plywood Construction and People's Choice Prize - Floating Saun
- 2012 Private House Award 2008-2012 from the Union of the Estonian architects; Shared 2nd place — Musician's house in Tallinn
- 2012 Kuldmuna Award; “Hõbemuna” (Silver Egg) prize in ambient design category - BAUA exhibition booth at UIA Congress in Tokyo
- 2011 Estonian Design Award; Silver prize in Environmental Design category - BAUA exhibition booth at UIA Congress in Tokyo
- 2010 Annual Prize of the Estonian Association of Interior Architects; Best Public Interior Prize - ADM Interactive office
- 2009 Annual Architectural Prize of the Estonian Culture Endowment - Rotermann's Old and New Flour Storage
- 2003 Annual Architecture prize of the Estonian Cultural Endowment - Lasnamäe Track and Field Centre
- 2003 Special Award 2003 by the Estonian Concrete Union - Lasnamäe Track and Field Centre
