= Tulik =

Tulik is a surname. Notable people with the surname include:

- Angelo Tulik (born 1990), French cyclist
- Ülo Tulik (1957–2022), Estonian agronomist
