= Hannes Walter =

Hannes Walter may refer to:

- Hannes Walter (historian)
- Hannes Walter (politician)
