= Lembit Kaljuvee =

Estonian politician

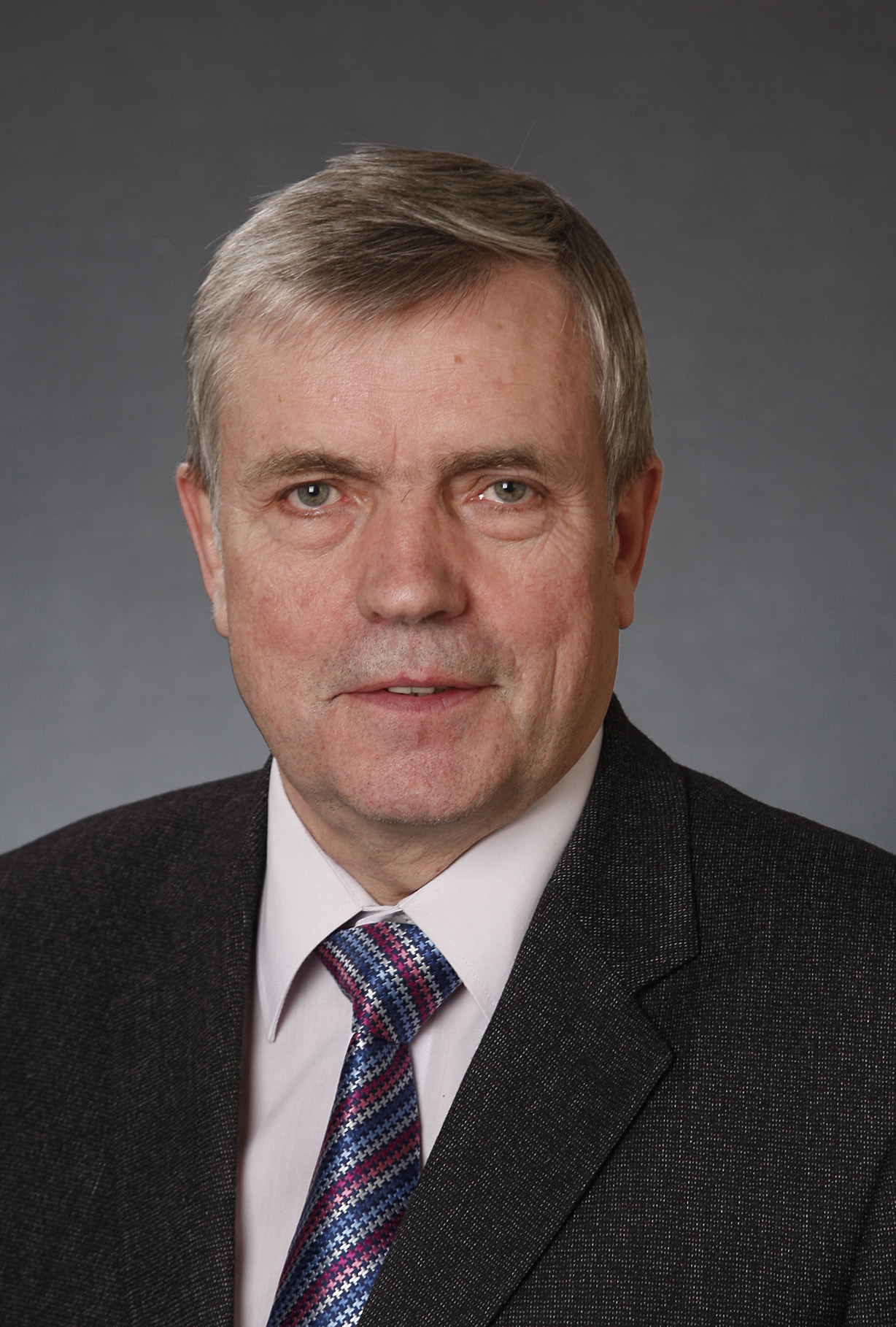
Lembit Kaljuvee

Lembit Kaljuvee (born 29 December 1952 in Raja) is an Estonian politician. He has been member of XI and XII Riigikogu.

He is a member of Estonian Centre Party.
