= Baltic states under Soviet rule (1944–1991) =

The three Baltic states – Estonia, Latvia and Lithuania – were re-occupied in 1944–1945 by the Soviet Union (USSR) following the German occupation. The Baltic states regained independence in 1990–1991.

In 1944–1945, World War II and the occupation by Nazi Germany ended. Then, re-occupation and annexation by the Soviet Union occurred, as the three countries became constituent "union republics" of the USSR: Estonian SSR, Latvian SSR, and Lithuanian SSR. The three countries remained under Soviet rule until regaining their full independence in August 1991, a few months prior to the eventual dissolution of the Soviet Union in December 1991.

Soviet rule in the Baltic states led to mass deportations to other parts of the Soviet Union, in order to quell resistance and weaken national identity. Mass migration from other parts of the Soviet Union into the Baltic states had a similar effect. The Soviet Union also required the Baltic states to industrialize to maximize the Soviet economy, and isolated the Baltic states from western influence. The Russian language became compulsory in schools, and freedom of expression was restricted throughout the population. In the late 1980s, while Mikhail Gorbachev was in charge of the Soviet Union, the Baltic states took many steps toward autonomy, and eventually towards independence.

== Sovietization ==
Between 1940 and 1987, the Soviet Union carried out a process of sovietization aimed to weaken the national identities of the peoples of the Baltic states.

=== Resistance and deportations ===
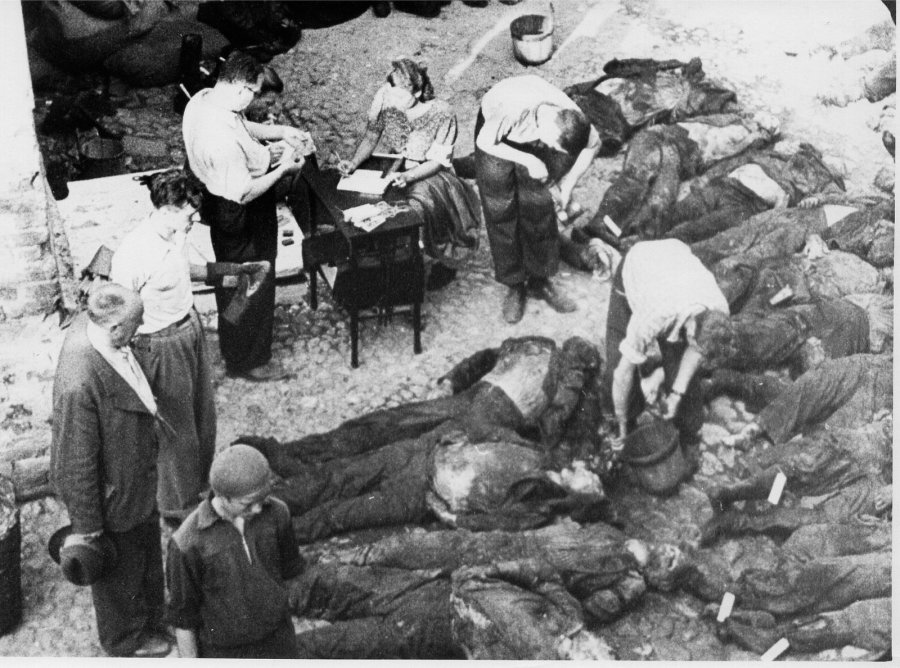
Exhumed victims of the 1941 NKVD prisoner massacre in Tartu

An important component of sovietization was large-scale industrialisation, then direct attacks on culture, religion, and freedom of expression. The Soviets used mass deportations to eliminate resistance to collectivisation and support for the partisans.

The Baltic partisans resisted Soviet rule by armed struggle for many years. The Estonian Forest brothers, as they were known, enjoyed material support among the local population. The Soviets had already carried out deportations in 1940–41, but the deportations between 1944 and 1952 were much larger in number. In March 1949, the Soviet Council of Ministers organised a mass deportation of 90,000 Baltic nationals, whom they labelled as enemies of the people, to inhospitable areas of the Soviet Union.

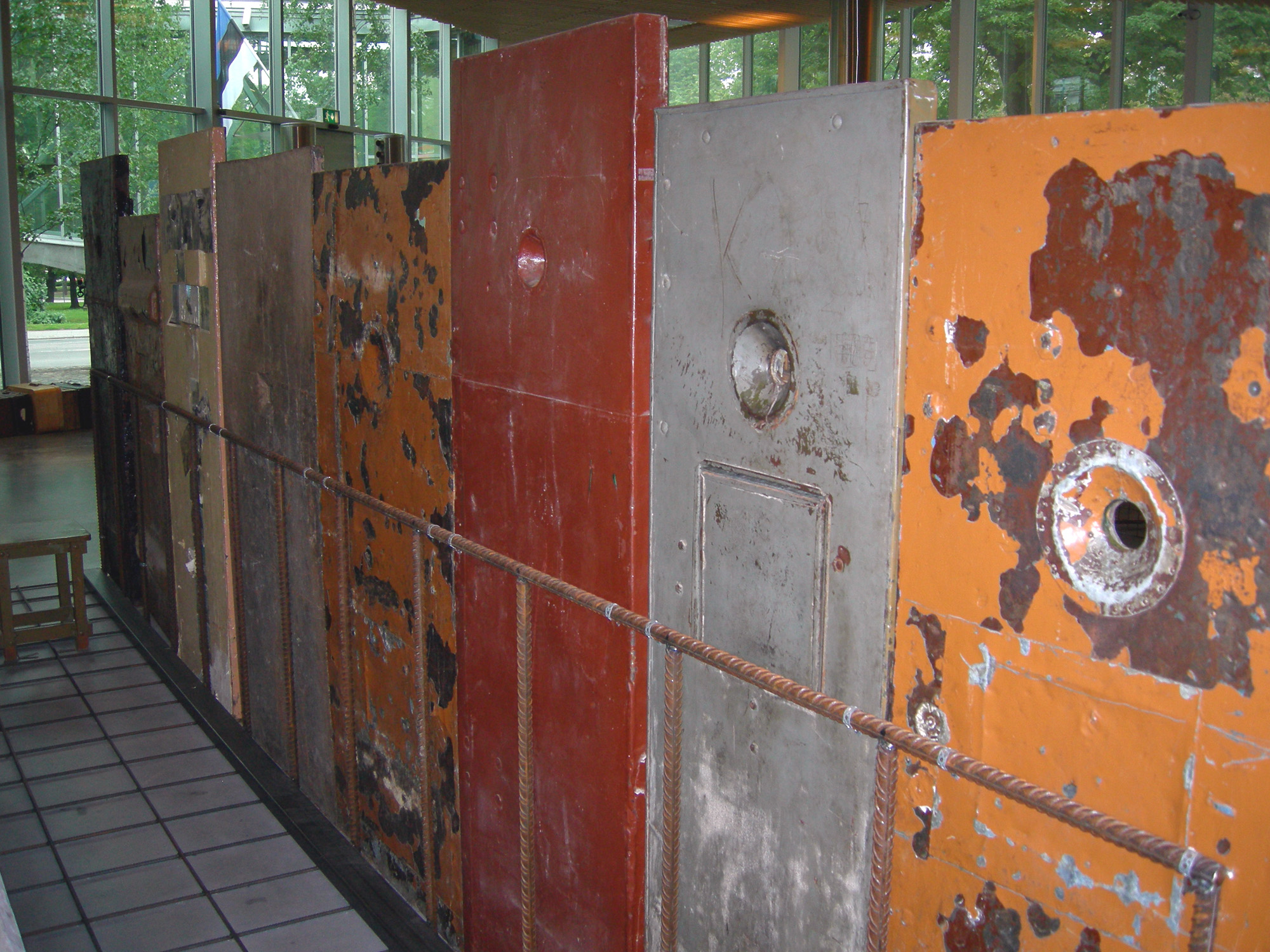
Soviet prison doors on display in the Museum of Occupations in Tallinn.

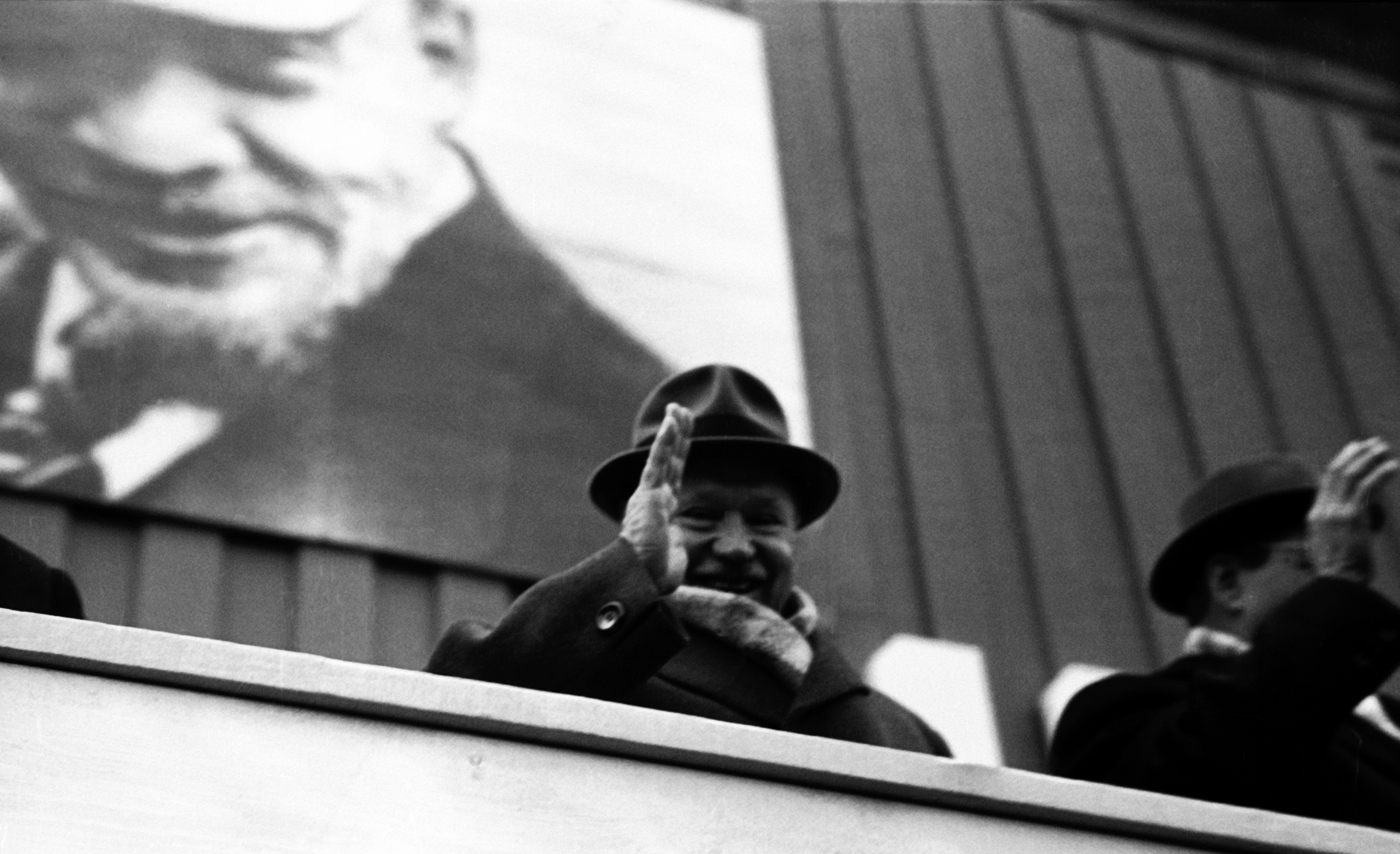
Antanas Sniečkus, the leader of the Communist Party of Lithuania from 1940 to 1974

The total numbers of those deported between 1944 and 1955 has been estimated at 124,000 in Estonia, 136,000 in Latvia, and 245,000 in Lithuania. The survived deportees were allowed to return after the secret speech of Nikita Khrushchev in 1956, however many did not survive in their years in Siberia. Large numbers of the inhabitants of the Baltic countries fled westwards before the Red Army arrived in 1944. After the war, the Soviets established new borders for the Baltic republics, adding the regions of Vilnius and Klaipėda to Lithuania and transferring 5 percent of Estonian territory and 2 percent of Latvian territory to the Russian SFSR.

=== Industrialization and immigration ===
The Soviets made large capital investments for energy resources and the manufacture of industrial and agricultural products. The purpose was to integrate the Baltic economics into the larger Soviet economic sphere. The industrial plans and a transport infrastructure were advanced by the Soviet standards. In all three republics, manufacturing industry was developed at the expense of other sectors, notably agriculture and housing. The rural economy suffered from the lack of investments and the collectivization. Baltic urban areas were damaged during wartime and it took ten years to make up for losses in housing. New constructions were often poor quality and Russian settlers were favored in housing.

Estonia and Latvia received a large-scale influx of Russian settlers who came to fill industrial jobs, which changed the demographics dramatically. Lithuania also received settlers, but to a lesser degree. Ethnic Estonians constituted 88 percent before the war. In 1970, the figure dropped to 60 percent. Ethnic Latvians constituted 75 percent, but the figure dropped to 56.8 percent in 1970 and further down to 52 percent in 1989.

In contrast, in Lithuania, the drop was 4 percent. The absence of Russian immigration was only a part of the explanation, as Lithuania gained the Vilnius area, fewer Lithuanians fled west and the state lost its Jewish minority. There was a difference in perception of ethnic Russians. Ethnic Russians who had migrated to Lithuania before the 1940 annexation and learned the Lithuanian language were considered "local Russians" by the Lithuanians and had better relations with locals than Russian settlers arriving under the Soviet rule.

Baltic communists had supported and participated in the 1917 October Revolution in Russia. However, many of them were executed in the National operations of the NKVD (Latvian, Estonian) during the Great Purge in late 1930s. The colonial regimes of 1944 were established by mostly imported Russian settlers, who filled the majority of political, administrative, and managerial posts.

For example, the important post of second secretary of local Communist party was almost always ethnic Russian or a member of another Slavic nationality. Party membership continued to be heavily Russian long into the postwar period. During the last quarter of 1944, the Estonian Communist Party had only 56 members, and recruitment in 1945 totaled a few hundred.

The colonial regimes of Estonia and Lithuania had authorities who were mostly imported Russian settlers. Latvia's colonial regime under Soviet Russian rule had a slim Latvian majority. The colonial regimes were disguised as “Communist Parties.” The new Lithuanian Communist Party was only 38% Lithuanian, with most of the party being made up of Russian settlers in 1953. The Latvian Communist Party was 52% Latvian in 1949. Estonians made up 42% of Estonia’s Communist Party in 1946.

In Lithuania, thousands of non-indigenous administrators were imported at all levels. Even the native Lithuanian population included a group that lived in Russia, 13% of the ministers of Russian Lithuanians out of a total indigenous percentage of 32% in 1947.

In March 1949, of the 30 non-staff lecturers in the Agitprop Department of the City of Riga, only 8 knew Latvian, and these people were tasked with spreading Soviet ideology among the native population. Home-grown Communists in all three countries represented about one-third of the total membership around 1949. Despite the career opportunities involved in the occupation regimes, only 0.3% of the Lithuanians and 0.7% of the Latvians and Estonians had joined the Communist Parties after five years of continuous Russian occupation, reflecting the unpopularity of the occupation. This rate was 5 to 10 times less than the Soviet Union's average for Soviet Republics at the time.

== Everyday life ==
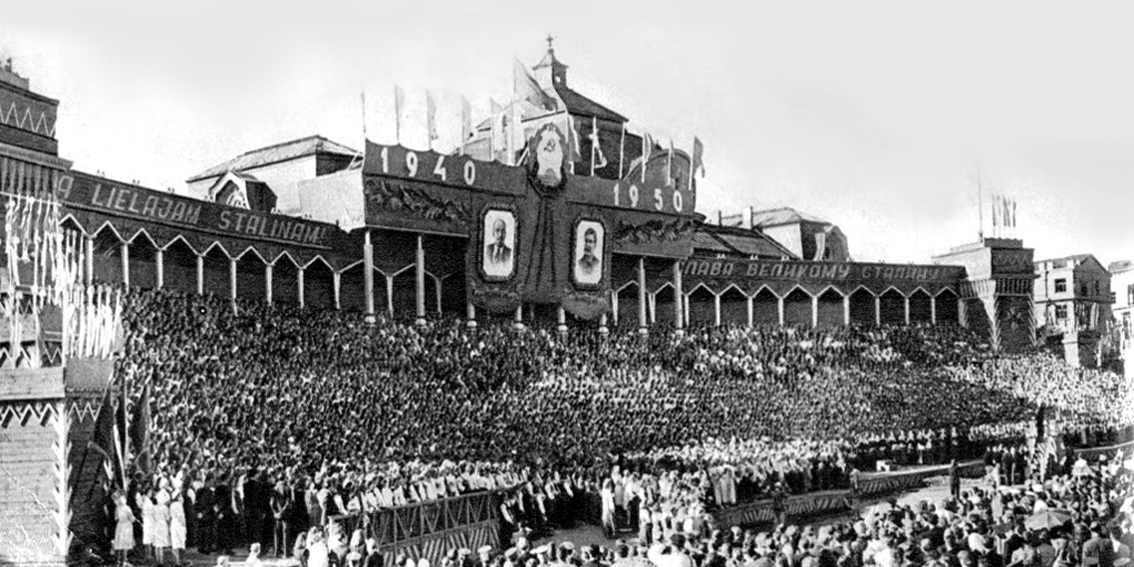
1950 Latvian Song Festival marking the 10th anniversary of the first Soviet occupation of Latvia. The stage is decorated with portraits of Lenin and Stalin, and emblem of the Latvian Soviet Socialist Republic (centre), as well as text "Glory to mighty Stalin" in both Latvian and Russian

The Baltic republics were largely isolated from the outside world between the late 1940s and the mid-1980s. The Soviets were sensitive about the Baltic area, not only because of concerns about its loyalty, but also because of several military installations located there due to its proximity to several Scandinavian non-Eastern Bloc states, including surveillance centres and a submarine base.

During the late 1960s, Soviet democratic movements found support amongst Baltic intellectuals. The Soviet Union signed the Helsinki Accords and the following year, a monitoring group was founded in Lithuania which produced dissident publications during the 1970s and 1980s. Nationalism and religion inspired people to small-scale demonstrations and underground activities. The European Parliament passed a resolution supporting the Baltic cause in 1982.

The Soviet Union maintained ethnic diversity, but on the other hand, it made efforts to impose uniformity. A new wave of Russification targeting the education system began in the late 1970s, attempting to create a Soviet national identity. The education of Baltic children was conducted in their native languages, but the Russian language was compulsory. In addition, the Soviet authorities limited freedom of expression in literature and the visual arts.

The Estonian song festivals and Latvian Song and Dance Festivals remained a vital and semi-covert means of national self-expression. Nevertheless, intellectual life and scientific research were advanced by Soviet standards. However, after 1975, there were increasing problems with shortages of consumer and food products, social problems, unchecked immigration, and damage to the environment. By the 1980s, there was social and political tension both within the Baltic republics and between them and Moscow.

== Road to independence ==
=== Soviet reforms ===
The Era of Stagnation brought about the crisis of the Soviet system, and reforms could no longer be ignored or delayed. The new Soviet leader Mikhail Gorbachev came to power in 1985 and responded with glasnost and perestroika. There were attempts to reform the Soviet system from above to avoid revolution from below. The reforms failed to take into account that the USSR was held together by military force, which repressed all forms of nationalism. The freedoms of Glasnost released long-held feelings of nationalism in the Baltic republics, in a development known as the Singing Revolution. The first major demonstrations against the system were in Riga in November 1986 and the following spring in Tallinn. Small successful protests encouraged key individuals and by the end of 1988, the reform wing had gained a decisive position in the Baltic republics.

At the same time, coalitions of reformists and populist forces assembled in Popular Fronts. They concentrated largely on calls for autonomy rather than independence. The Supreme Soviet of the Estonian SSR made the Estonian language the state language again in January 1989, and similar legislation was passed in Latvia and Lithuania soon after. Next, the Baltic republics declared their sovereignty: in November 1988 in Estonia, in May 1989 in Lithuania, and July 1989 in Latvia. The Estonian Supreme Soviet reserved the right to veto laws of the Supreme Soviet of the Soviet Union. The Supreme Soviet of the Lithuanian SSR even referred to Lithuania's independent past and its illegal annexation into the Soviet Union in 1940. The Supreme Soviet of the Latvian SSR was more cautious. The presidium of the Supreme Soviet of the Soviet Union condemned the Estonian legislation as "unconstitutional".

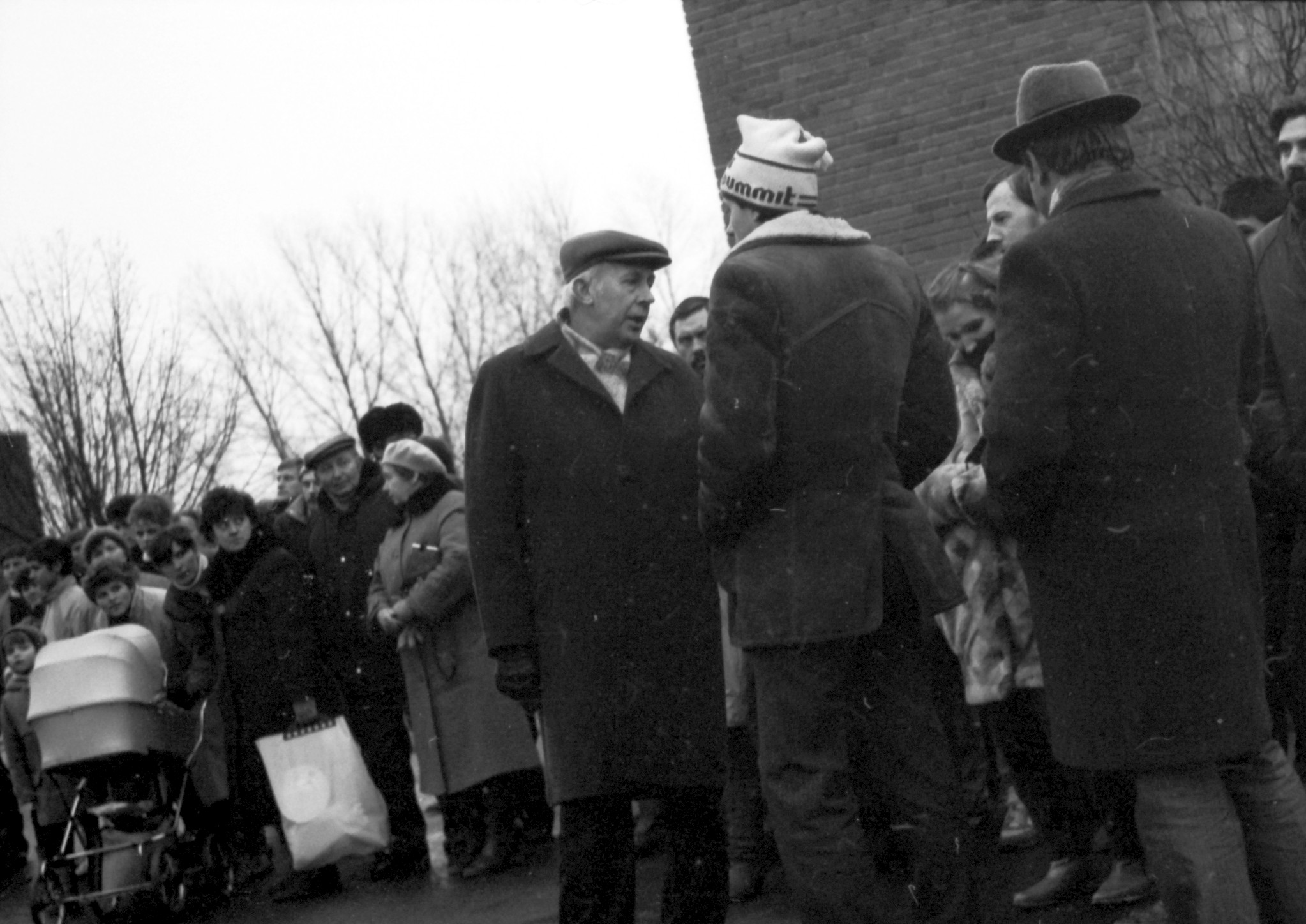
The head of the KGB in Lithuania Eduardas Eismuntas (centre, wearing cap) argues with Lithuanian protesters, January 1990

The first Supreme Soviet elections took place in March 1989. There was still only one legal communist party, but the availability of multi-candidate choice encouraged the popular fronts and other groups to spread their electoral message. The Communist Party in all three Baltic republics was divided along nationalist lines, and political leaders were increasingly responding to people rather than the party. The biggest demonstration was the Baltic Way in August 1989, where people protested on the fiftieth anniversary of the Molotov–Ribbentrop Pact by a human chain linking hands across the three republics. Still, by 1990, there were not yet calls for political independence but demands for economic independence from Moscow.

=== Restorations of independence ===
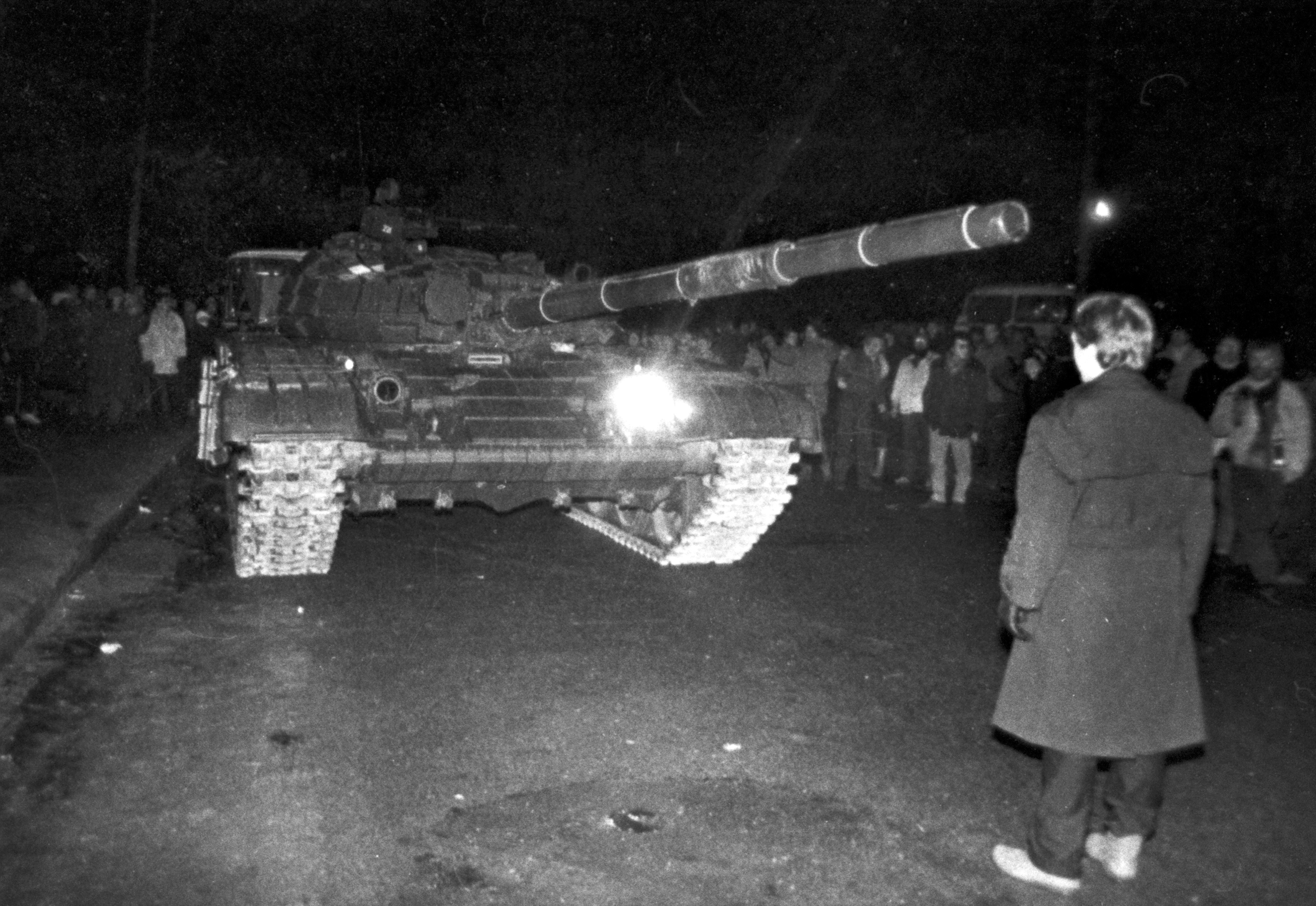
Unarmed Lithuanian citizen standing against a Soviet tank during the January Events.

In February 1990, the Lithuanian Supreme Soviet elections led to the independence Sąjūdis-backed nationalists achieving a two-thirds majority. On 11 March 1990, the Lithuanian Supreme Soviet declared Lithuania's independence. As a result, the Soviets imposed a blockade on 17 April. Latvia and Estonia, with large Russian minorities, lagged behind.

At the same time, the Popular Fronts were in increasing the pressure in Latvia and Estonia, as the citizens committee movement prepared for wholly non-Soviet elections to take place at or near the time of the Supreme Soviet elections. They saw that independence could never be restored legally by organs of the occupying powers. The pro-independence candidates received overwhelming majorities in the Supreme Soviet elections of March 1990. On 30 March 1990, the Estonian Supreme Soviet declared independence. In particular, it declared the 1940 annexation illegal and began the transition towards an independent Republic of Estonia. On 4 May 1990, the Latvian Supreme Soviet made a similar declaration.

On 12 May 1990, the leaders of the Baltic republics signed a joint declaration renewing the Baltic Entente of 1934. By mid-June, after unsuccessful economic blockade of Lithuania, the Soviets started negotiations with Lithuania and the other two Baltic republics on the condition that they agreed to freeze their declarations of independence. The Soviets had a bigger challenge elsewhere, in the form of the Russian Federal Republic proclaiming sovereignty in June.

Simultaneously, the Baltic republics also started to negotiate directly with the Russian Soviet Federative Socialist Republic (RSFSR). In Autumn 1990, they set up a customs border between the Baltic states, the RSFSR and the Byelorussian SSR. After the failed negotiations, the Soviets made a dramatic attempt to break the deadlock and sent troops to Lithuania and Latvia in January 1991. The attempts failed, dozens of civilians were killed, and the Soviet troops decided to retreat.

In August 1991, the hard-line members of the Soviet government attempted to take control of the Soviet Union. One day after the coup on 21 August, the Estonians proclaimed independence. Shortly afterwards Soviet paratroops seized the Tallinn television tower. The Supreme Soviet of the Latvian SSR made a similar declaration the same day. The coup failed, but the collapse of the Soviet Union became unavoidable. On 28 August, the European Community welcomed the restoration of the sovereignty and independence of the Baltic states.

The Soviet Union recognised the Baltic independence on 6 September 1991. The Russian troops stayed for an additional three years, as Boris Yeltsin linked the issue of Russian minorities with troop withdrawals. Lithuania was the first to have the Russian troops withdrawn from its territory in August 1993. On 26 July 1994, Russian troops withdrew from Estonia, and on 31 August 1994, Russian troops withdrew from Latvia.

The Russian Federation ended its military presence in Estonia, after it relinquished control of the nuclear facilities in Paldiski, on 26 September 1995, and in Latvia, after Skrunda-1 suspended operations, on 31 August 1998, and subsequently dismantled. The last Russian soldier left Skrunda-1 in October 1999, thus marking a symbolic end to the Russian military presence on the soil of the Baltic countries.
