= Jaan Mark =

Estonian politician (born 1951)

Jaan Mark (born 11 June 1951) is an Estonian politician. He is a member of the Estonian Reform Party. He served as the governor of Harju County from 2005 to 2006.

Political offices
Preceded by Orm Valtson	Governor of Harju County; 2005–2006	Succeeded by Värner Lootsmann
