= Hanno (given name) =

Male given name

- Gender: Male
- Name day: 22 October

Hanno is a male given name.

People named Hanno include:

- Hanno Balitsch (born 1981), German footballer
- Hanno Behrens (born 1990), German footballer
- Hanno Dirksen (born 1991), South African rugby player
- Hanno Douschan (born 1989), Austrian snowboarder
- Hanno Drechsler (1931–2003), political scientist
- Hanno Grossschmidt (born 1973), Estonian architect
- Hanno Kitshoff (born 1984), South African rugby player
- Hanno Koffler (born 1980), German actor and musician
- Hanno Kompus (1890–1974), Estonian theatre director and art critic and historian
- Hanno Melzer, German rower
- Hanno Möttölä (born 1976), Finnish basketball player
- Hanno Pevkur (born 1977), Estonian politician
- Hanno Pöschl (born 1949), Austrian television actor
- Hanno Rund (1925–1993), German mathematician
- Hanno Selg (1932–2019), Estonian pentathlete
- Hanno Teuteberg, South African naval officer

== Fictional characters ==
- Hanno Tauber, an antagonist of the television series Dark
