= Pärnu Concert Hall =

Building in Pärnu, Estonia

- Pärnu kontserdimaja
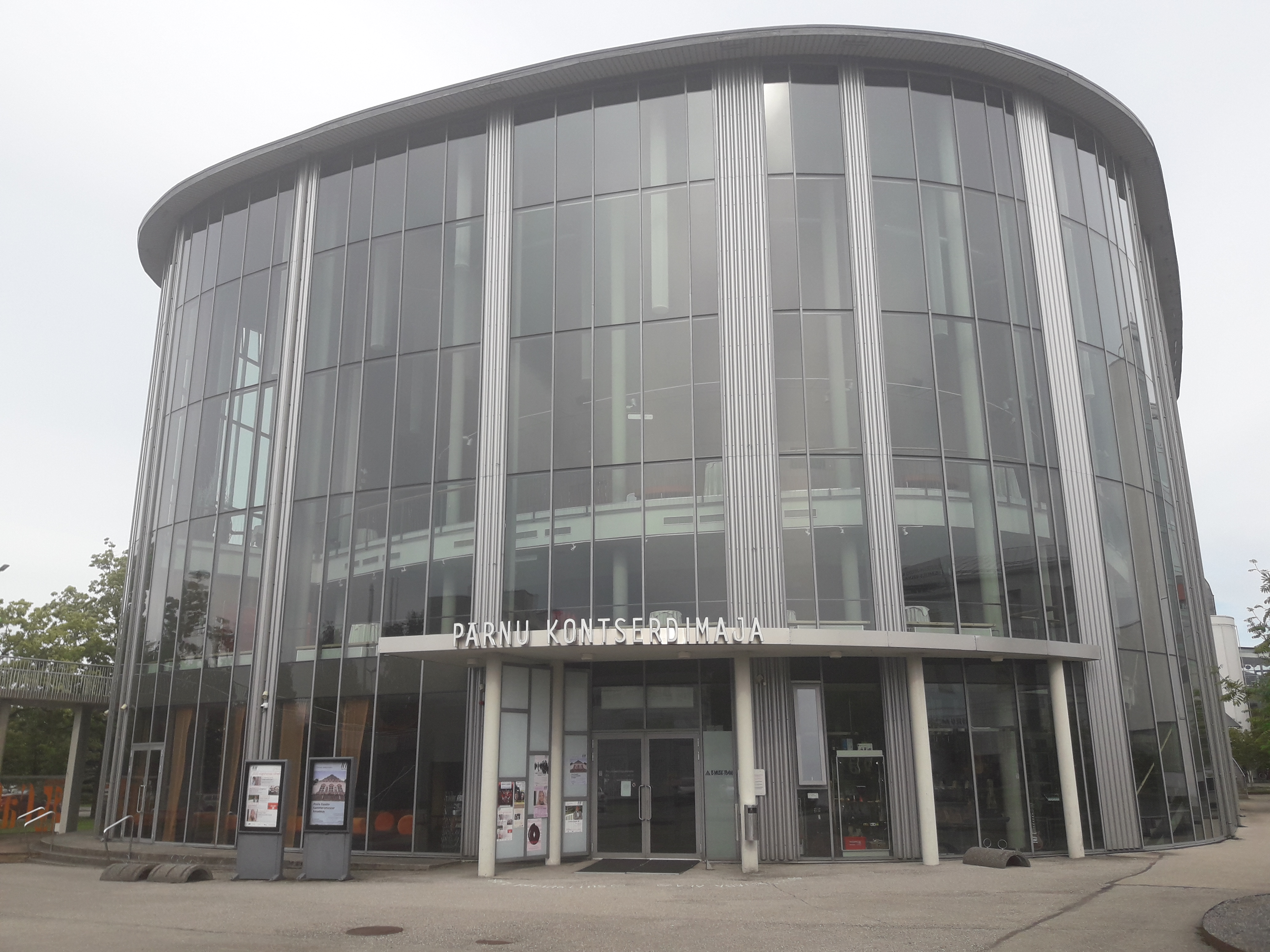
- Pärnu Concert Hall
- Interactive map of Pärnu Concert Hall
- Address: Aida 4, Pärnu, 80011 Pärnu maakond, Estonia
- Location: Pärnu, Estonia
- Coordinates: 58°23′14″N 24°30′00″E

Website
- concert.ee/en/kontserdi-toimumiskoht/parnu-concert-hall/

Pärnu Concert Hall (Estonian: Pärnu kontserdimaja) is a concert hall in Pärnu, Estonia. The hall is operated by Eesti Kontsert. The most solemn events in Pärnu are held there. For example, the Mayor and New Year's Eve celebrations.

The hall is also home for Pärnu Music School, Pärnu City Orchestra, music shop (Is Music team).

The architects of the building are Katrin Koov, Kaire Nõmm and Hanno Grossschmidt. The main construction contractor was AS Remet. Construction on the hall began in early 2002 hall and opened to the public on 30 November 2002. The cost of the building was 95 million kroons, of which 75 million kroons came from the state budget and 20 million kroons from the Pärnu city budget.

== Pärnu City Orchestra ==
The Pärnu City Orchestra (Estonian: Pärnu Linnaorkester), is the house orchestra of the Pärnu Concert Hall.

=== History ===
The Pärnu City Orchestra was founded in 1994, although its origins can be traced back to a salon orchestra that was founded by a pair of local musicians in 1920.

Its first music director was Loit Lepalaan, who was succeeded by Jüri Alperten in 1998. Considered the decisive figure in the orchestra's history, he began a tradition of conducting programs of Wolfgang Amadeus Mozart's music on his birthday, with Kalle Randalu at the piano. An all-Mozart program that had been scheduled for his 65th birthday became a memorial tribute after his death in 2017.

After Alperten's death, the Pärnu City Orchestra was temporarily without a music director, and played with a series of guest conductors, until Kaspar Mänd was appointed to the post in 2019. According to the orchestra's manager, Mänd earned the job on the strength of his artistic vision and personality.

In 2012, the orchestra produced its first CD, 6 Seasons+. On February 11 and 12, 2023, it commemorated the 80th birthday of Gavin Bryars with programs devoted to his music, which included three Estonian premieres. The composer attended the concerts, which were conducted by Mikk Üleoja.

Under current music director Kaspar Mänd, the Pärnu City Orchestra has become known for its championing of music by contemporary Estonian composers.
