= Jüri Alperten =

Estonian conductor, pianist, and music teacher (1957–2020)

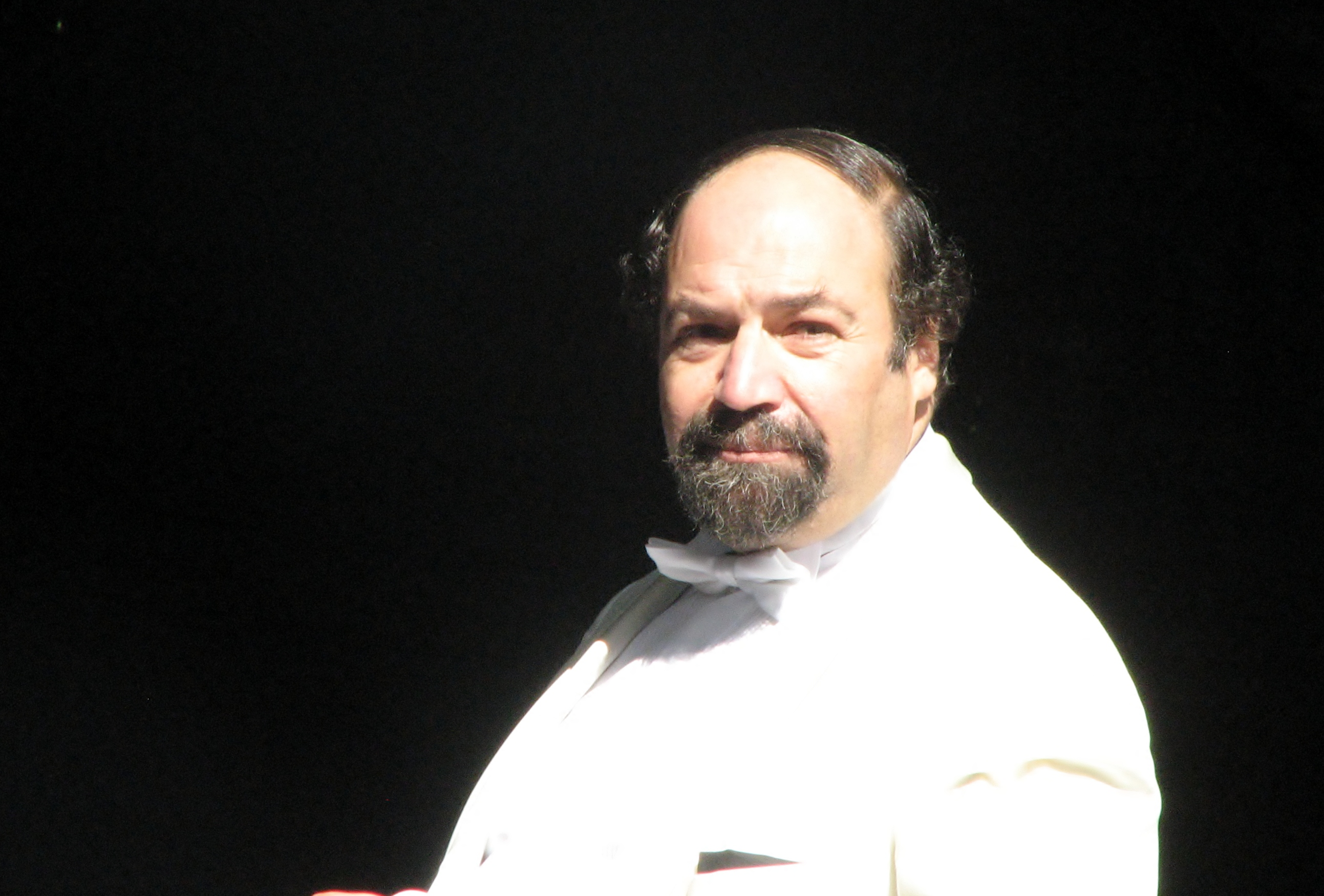
Jüri Alperten in 2012

Jüri Alperten (16 September 1957 in Tallinn – 26 August 2020 in Tallinn) was an Estonian conductor, pianist and music teacher.

== Life and career ==
His father was violinist Moissei Alperten and his mother was mother pianist and music teacher Renate Goznaja.

He was married to Estonian mezzo-soprano Karin Andrekson.

He was of Jewish heritage.

In 1979, he graduated from Tallinn State Conservatory in piano and also in conducting speciality.

Since 1985, he was the conductor of the Estonian National Opera (from 2002 to 2004 he was its principal conductor). From 1998 to 2019, he was the chief conductor of Pärnu City Orchestra.

From 1993 to 2020, he taught orchestral conducting at Estonian Academy of Music and Theatre.

== Awards ==
- 1997 and 2002 Annual Prize of the Estonian Cultural Endowment for Music
- 2001 Annual Prize of the Estonian Theatre Union in the music theatre production category
