= Kaire Nõmm =

Estonian architect

Kaire Nõmm (born on 20 April 1971 in Tallinn) is an Estonian architect.

In 1997 she graduated from Estonian Academy of Arts in architecture speciality.

Since 2014 she is working at the company Lahemahe OÜ. She is also the architect of Hiiumaa Parish.

== Works ==
- 2005: Pärnu Inner-City Gym (with Heidi Urb, Katrin Koov and Siiri Vallner)
- 2002: Pärnu Concert Hall (with Katrin Koov and Hanno Grossschmidt)
