= Ulla Preeden =

Estonian geologist, academic and politician

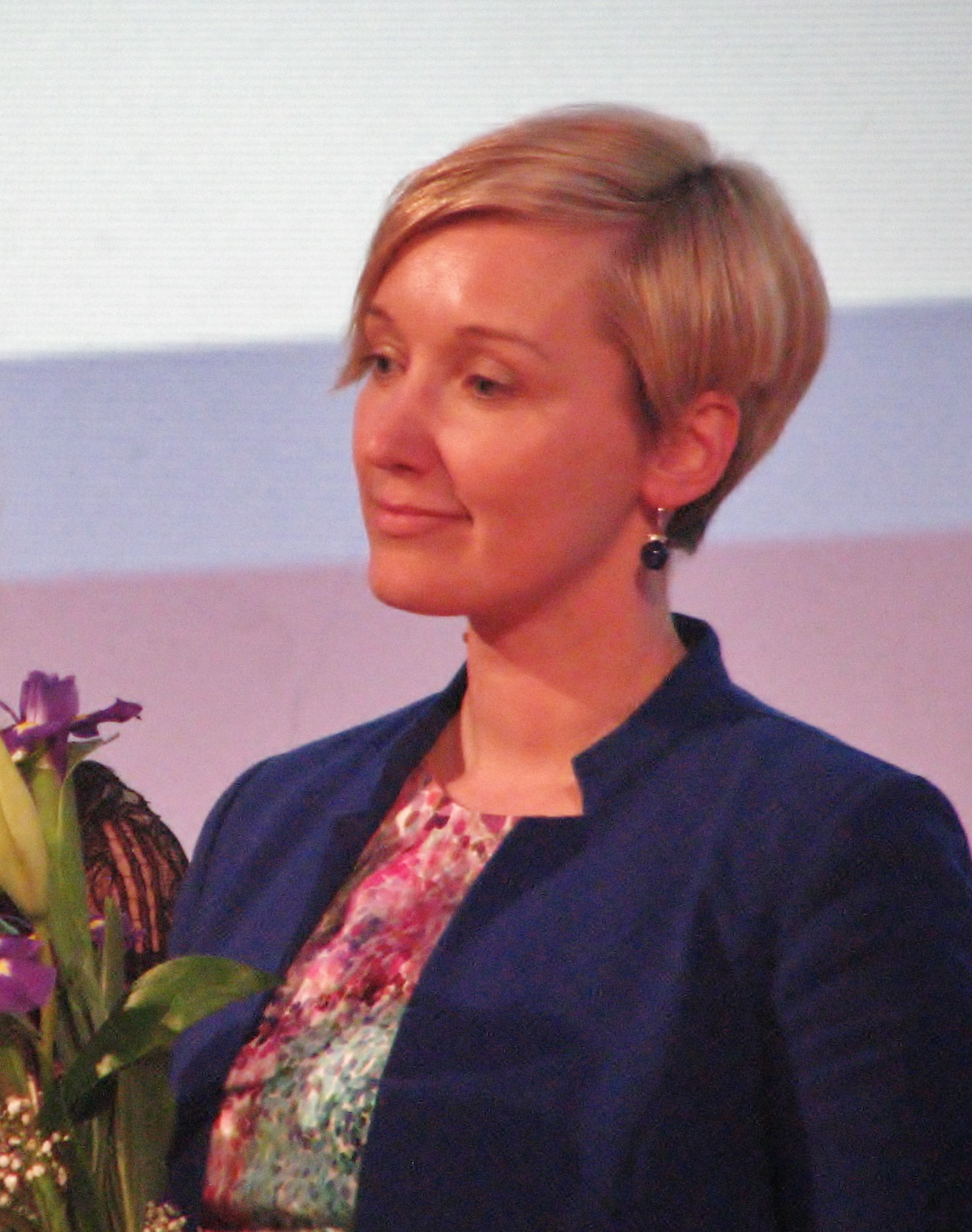
- Ulla Preeden in 2015
- Born: 29 April 1980 (age 46)
- Occupations: Geologist & academic
- Political party: Isamaa

Ulla Preeden (born 29 April 1980) is an Estonian geologist, academic and politician.

== Academia ==
Preeden studied at the University of Tartu here she gained her PhD in geology in 2008. Her thesis considered secondary magnetization of Sedimentary rocks.

After working as a researcher on geophysics and mineralogy at the University of Tartu, she was appointed the rector of the Tartu Health Care College in 2016 for a five-year term. In 2019, under her leadership, the college established the first masters programme in radiography in the Baltic States. She is a member of Estonian Rectors’ Conference of Universities of Applied Sciences, a EURASHE member.

== Politics ==
Preeden is a member of the Isamaa political party where she has held positions including as a member of the governing council and chair of the party's Women's council. In 2011 she became the governor of Põlva, making her the first female governor since Estonian independence in southeast Estonia and the country's youngest governor. She held the post until 2016.

== Personal ==
Since 2013, she has been a member of the Women's Home Defence group of the paramilitary defence organisation the Estonian Defence League.
