= Arvo Sarapuu =

Estonian politician (1953–2020)

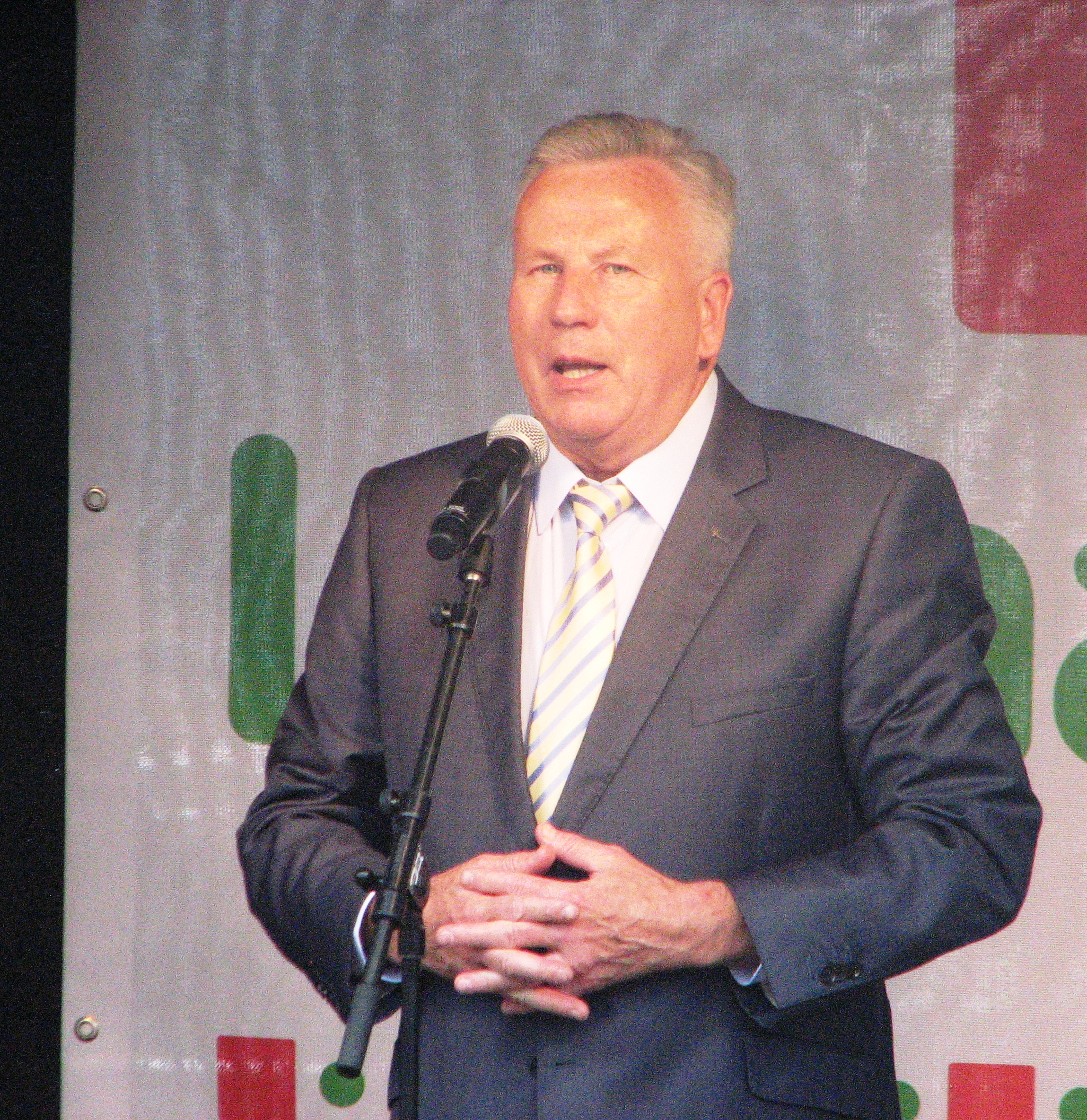

Deputy Mayor of Tallinn
- In office April 2011 – May 26, 2017

County Governor of Järva County
- In office 1989–1997
- Preceded by: Herman Lipp (1944)
- Succeeded by: Theo Aasa

Personal details
- Born: August 26, 1953 Tartu, Estonia
- Died: March 17, 2020 (aged 66)
- Party: Estonian Centre
- Spouse: Kersti Sarapuu (?–2020; his death)
- Children: Five
- Education: Tallinn University of Technology

Arvo Sarapuu (August 26, 1953 – March 17, 2020) was an Estonian businessman, politician, and member of the Estonian Centre Party. Sarapuu served as the first post-independence County Governor of Järva County from 1989 until 1997. He then served as the Deputy Mayor of Tallinn, the capital of Estonia, from April 2011 until his resignation on May 26, 2017, due to allegations of corruption.

Arvo Sarapuu died on March 17, 2020, at the age of 66. He was survived by his wife, Kersti Sarapuu, who served as Mayor of Paide from 2005 to 2011, and their five children. Sarapuu was buried in Metsakalmistu cemetery in Tallinn.

== Honors ==
- Order of the National Coat of Arms, 3rd class (2006)
