= Raja, Jõgeva County =

Village in Estonia

Coordinates: 58°49′19″N 26°56′35″E

Raja
- Village
- Interactive map of Raja
- Country: Estonia
- County: Jõgeva County
- Parish: Mustvee Parish
- Time zone: UTC+2 (EET)
  - Summer (DST): UTC+3 (EEST)

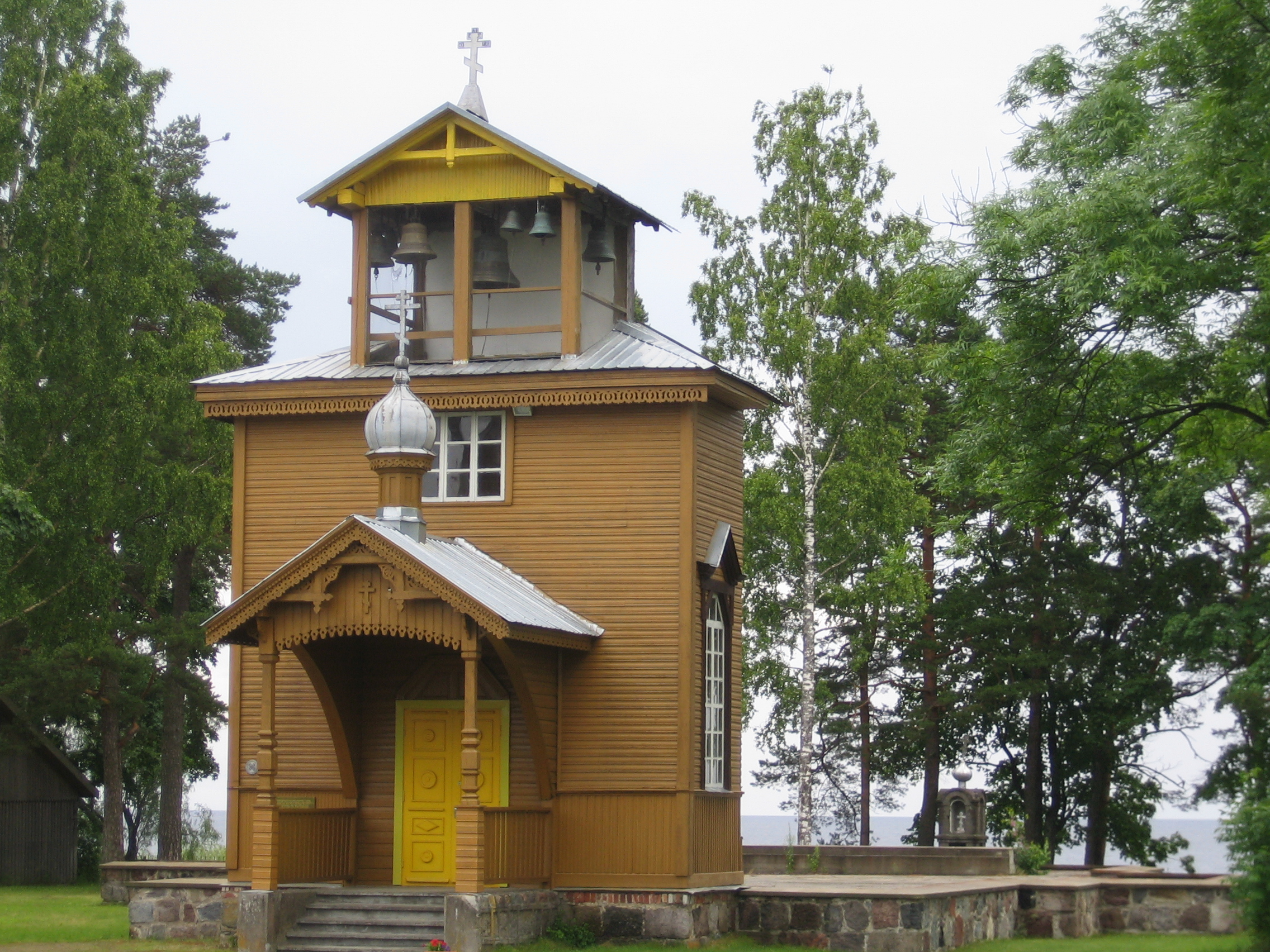
Old Believers' Church in Raja

Raja is a village located within the Mustvee Parish, Jõgeva County in Estonia.
