= Hanno Grossschmidt =

Estonian architect

- Born: October 7, 1973; Tallinn, Estonia
- Occupation: Architect

Hanno Grossschmidt (born 7 October 1973) is an Estonian architect.

From 1980 to 1991, Hanno Grossschmidt studied in the 7th Secondary School of Tallinn. From 1991 to 1993, Hanno Grossschmidt briefly studied in the Tallinn University of Technology. From 1993, he studied in the Estonian Academy of Arts in the department of architecture and city planning. He graduated from the academy in 1997. From 1998 to 1999 he studied in the Virginia Polytechnic Institute and State University. During that period he worked in the Lee McAllister Architectural Consulting Services bureau.

From 1999 Hanno Grossschmidt is an architect and co-owner in the COO Architects (since 2004 HG Architecture OÜ) architectural bureau.

Most notable works by Hanno Grossschmidt are the sports halls in Lasnamäe and Pärnu, Lootsi apartment building in the harbor area of Tallinn, Forum department store and the Old and New Flour Storage in the Rotermanni Quarter. In 2003 Hanno Grossschmidt received the annual architecture award of the Cultural Endowment of Estonia for the sports hall in Lasnamäe and also the Best Concrete Building 2003 award. In 2008 Hanno Grossschmidt was nominated for the Best Young Architect Award 2008. In 2009 the Old and New Flour Storage were nominated for the Mies van der Rohe Prize.

Hanno Grossschmidt is a member of the Union of Estonian Architects.

== Works ==
- Design for the exhibition “Matteus. Architect of Tartu”, 1997
- Design for the exhibition “Tallinn a Century Ago”, 1998
- Design for the exhibition “9596979899”, 1999
- Spa in Kuressaare, 2000
- Pärnu Concert Hall, 2002 (with Katrin Koov, Kaire Nõmm)
- Single-family home in Kakumäe, 2002
- Lasnamäe sports hall, 2003 (with Siiri Vallner, Tomomi Hayashi)
- Lootsi apartment building, 2005
- Foorum department store, 2007 (with Tomomi Hayashi)
- Reconstruction and extension of the Old Flour Storage in the Rotermanni Quarter, 2008 (with Tomomi Hayashi)

== Competitions ==
- Church of Kohtla-Järve, 1995, 3. prize
- Hotel and office building in Võru, 1998, 1. prize
- Sports center of Väike Munamäe, 1998,
- Extension of the Bank of Estonia, 1998, 3. prize
- planning of the old town of Võru, 1999, 1. prize
- Spa in Kuressaare, 2000, 1. prize
- Lasnamäe sports hall, 2000, 1. prize

== Awards ==
- Annual architecture award of the Cultural Endowment of Estonia, 2003
- Best Concrete Building 2003
