= Tiina Oraste =

Estonian politician (born 1962)

Tiina Oraste (born 2 October 1962 in Abja-Paluoja) is an Estonian politician. She was a member of XI Riigikogu. Oraste was the County Governor of Järva County from 2009 until 2014.
