= Katrin Koov =

Estonian architect

Katrin Koov (born 17 April 1973) is an Estonian architect.

Koov was born in Tallinn. She graduated from the Department of Architecture of the Estonian Academy of Arts in 1997. Since 2003, she has worked in the architectural bureau KAVAKAVA OÜ which she co-founded. In 2013, the Government of Estonia presented her with a cultural award for creative achievements in 2012. In 2014, she became the editor of Maja, the Estonian Architectural Review.

Notable works by Koov are the Concert Hall of Pärnu, the new sports arena of Pärnu and the new building of the Narva College of the University of Tartu. Koov is a member of the Eesti Arhitektide Liit (the Union of Estonian Architects).

== Works ==
- Pärnu Concert Hall, 2002 (with Kaire Nõmm, Hanno Grossschmidt)
- Central sports arena of Pärnu, 2005 (with Siiri Valner, Kaire Nõmm, Heidi Urb)
- The spatial design of the new center of Pärnu, 2009 (with Kaire Nõmm)
