= Tarmo Mänd =

Estonian politician

Tarmo Mänd (born 19 August 1950 in Hiiumaa) is an Estonian politician. He was a member of the XI and XII Riigikogu.

== Biography ==
Mänd has served as the Director General of the Riigikantselei and Secretary General of the Ministry of Defense. From 2001 until 2006, he was the Director of the Office of the President Arnold Rüütel. Since 17 April 2007, he was the Deputy Chairman of the Finance Committee of the Riigikogu. He was awarded the Order of the National Coat of Arms, IV Class, and in 2006, he was awarded with Order of the National Coat of Arms, II class.
