= List of mayors of Pärnu =

The following is a list of mayors of Pärnu, Estonia.

== Mayors ==
- 1879–1915, 1918, Oscar Alexander Brackmann (1841–1927)
- 1917–1918, Jaan Leesment (1870–1941)
- 1918, Oscar Alexander Brackmann (1841–1927)
- 1918–1919, Hugo Kuusner (1887–1942)
- 1920–1921, Jaan Timusk (1886–1957)
- 1921–1924, Hendrik Soo (1879–1939)
- 1924–1936, Oskar Kask (1898–1942)
- 1936–1939, Hendrik Soo (1879–1939)
- 1939–1940, Priit Suve (1901–1942)
  - 28 July 1940–, Robert Terase, acting
  - 1941 Vladimir Saar, Pärnu Linna TSN Täitevkomitee esimees
  - 1941 Jaak Nessler, Pärnu Linna TSN Täitevkomitee esimees
  - 1941–1942, Arthur Peetre (1907–1989)
  - 1942–1944, Voldemar Ernesaks (1903–1989)
  - 1944–1946, Jaak Nessler
  - 1946–1953, Villem Lombak]]
  - 1953–1957, Eduard Mettus]]
  - 1957–1959, Elmar Hallmägi
  - 1959–1962, Vladimir Makarov
  - 1962–1965, Valter Hallmägi
  - 1965–1974, Vladimir Makarov
  - 1974–1982, Henn Lõmps
  - 1982–1987, Mihhail Trofimov
  - 1987–1989, Valeri Dejev
- 1989–1992, Jaak Saarniit
- 1992–1995, Rein Kask
- 1995–1996, Väino Linde
- 1996–1999, Vello Järvesalu
- 1999–2000, Andres Sooniste
- 2000–2002, Einar Kelder
- 2002–2005, Väino Hallikmägi
- 28 April 2005 – 1 November 2005 Ahti Kõo
- 1 November 2005 – 19 November 2009 Mart Viisitamm
- 19 November 2009 – 30 March 2015 Toomas Kivimägi
- 30 March 2015 – 16 April 2015 Jane Mets, deputy
- 16 April 2015 – Romek Kosenkranius
