= Karl Robert Ruus =

Estonian politician

Karl-Robert Ruus (5 March 1899 Pangodi Parish, Tartu County – 22 May 1946 Magadan Oblast) was an Estonian politician. He was a member of Estonian National Assembly (Estonian: Rahvuskogu).

Ruus was born in Pangodu Parish (now part of Kambja Parish in Tartu County). He participated in the Estonian War of Independence. He studied agronomy intermittently at the University of Tartu from 1920 until 1932, graduating in 1936. Between the years 1930 until 1933, he was the governor of Valga County; from 1936 until 1940, the governor of Harju County; from 1941 until 1944, the governor of Lääne County. On 10 June 1940, he was elected director of Eesti Maapank. In 1944, he was arrested by the NKVD and died in the gulag in Magadan Oblast.
