= Einar Vallbaum =

Estonian economist and politician

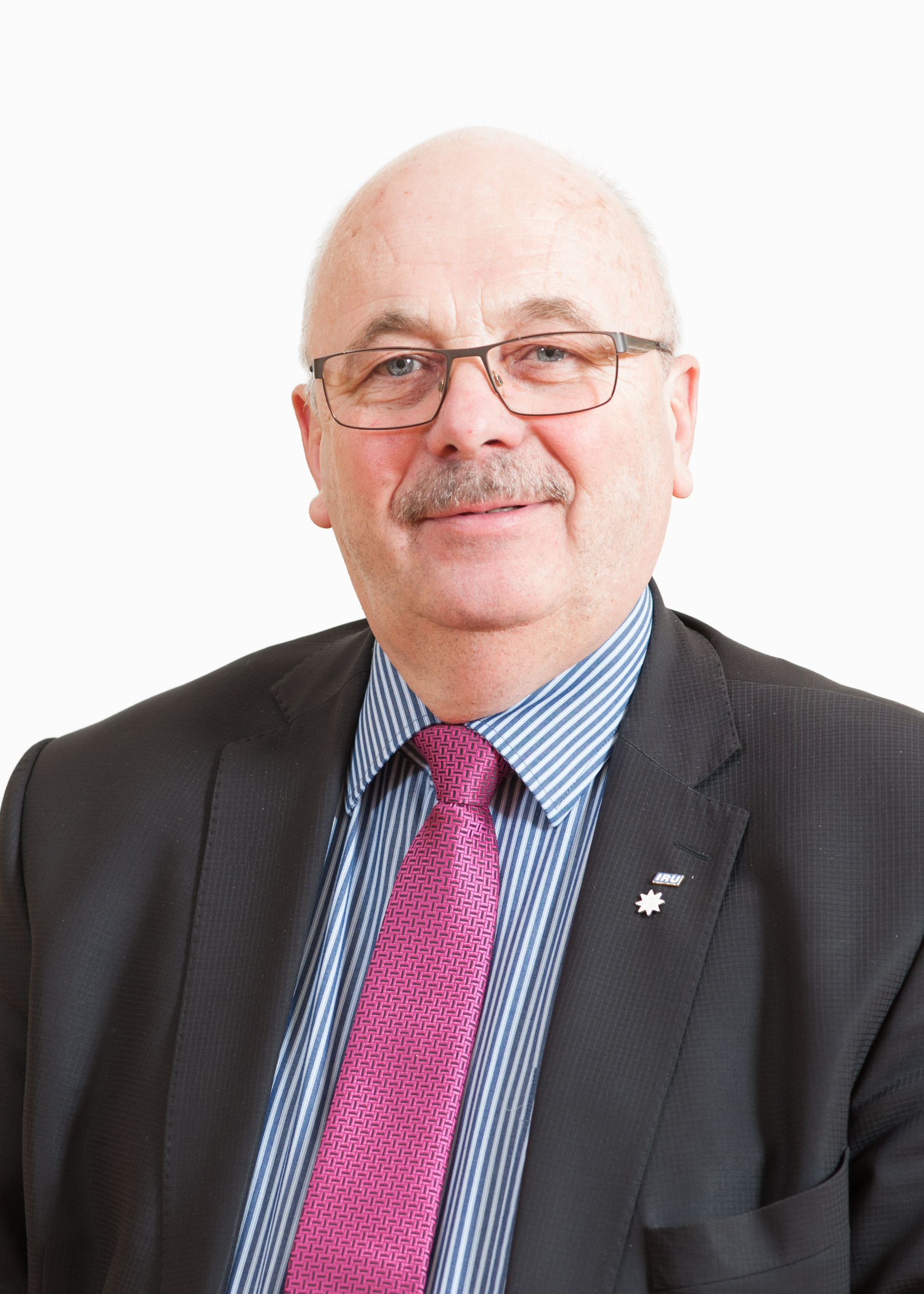
Einar Vallbaum

Einar Vallbaum (born 9 October 1959) is an Estonian economist and politician. He was a member of the XII and XIII Riigikogu.

Valbaum was born and raised in Rakvere. In 2007, he graduated with a degree in business management from Mainor Business School in Tallinn. He was a member of the Estonian Centre Party from 2002 until 2009, the Estonian Reform Party from 2010 until 2013, and the Union of Pro Patria and Res Publica since 2015.
