= Eha Pärn =

Estonian politician

Eha Pärn (born in 1957) is an Estonian municipal politician and civil servant.

2004–2005, she was County Governor of Tartu County.

In 2006, she was granted the Order of the White Star, IV Class.
