= Kalle Talviste =

Estonian politician (born 1945)

Kalle Talviste (born 17 April 1945) is an Estonian agronomist and politician. From 1991 until 2003, he was the Rapla County governor. He was a member of X Riigikogu.
