= Eduardas Eismuntas =

Soviet intelligence officer (1932–2019)

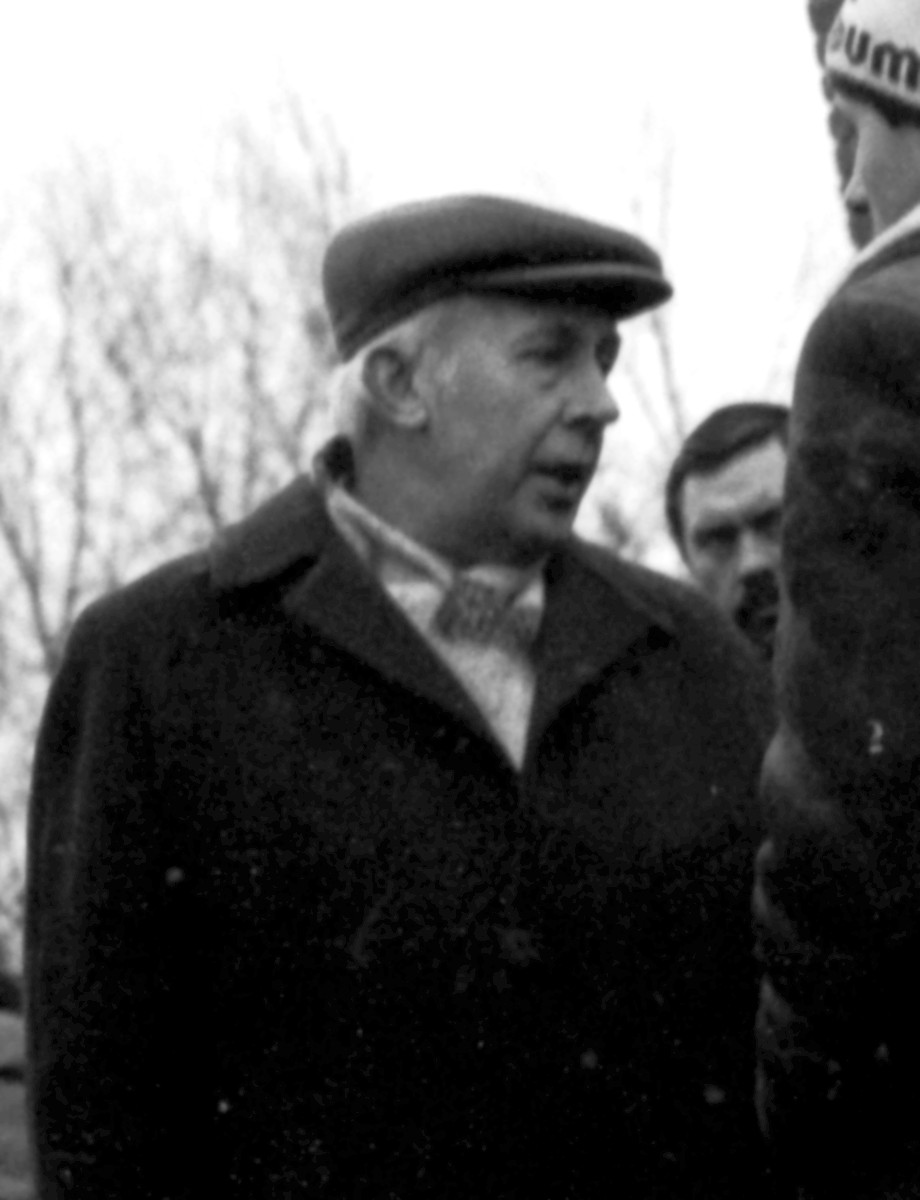
- Eismuntas in 1990
- Born: March 15, 1932; Kaunas, Lithuania
- Died: 2019 (aged 86–87)
- Occupation: KGB officer

Eduardas Eismuntas (March 15, 1932 – 2019) was a former KGB officer of the Lithuanian SSR. In October 1987, he was promoted to Major General. From April 1987 to May 1990, he was the chairman of the KGB of the Lithuanian SSR. His tenure coincided with the Sąjūdis movement and declaration of independence on 11 March 1990.

Eismuntas was born in Kaunas, Lithuania. He joined the Soviet security apparatus in 1950 and the Communist Party of the Soviet Union in 1953. He graduated from the Vilnius Operational School in 1952, Vilnius University in 1964, and Academy of Foreign Intelligence in 1968. From 1952 to 1978, Eismuntas worked in various capacities at the KGB of the Lithuanian SSR. In 1978, he was transferred to KGB in Moscow and worked as deputy director of the 2nd Section of the Fifth Department (1978–1982) and director of the 3rd Section of the Fifth Department (1982–1987). In 1987, he returned to Lithuania and became chairman of the KGB in Lithuania. The same year he was elected to the Supreme Soviet of the Lithuanian SSR.

As a KGB agent, Eismuntas worked to eliminate the Chronicle of the Catholic Church in Lithuania. As the chairman of the KGB in Lithuania, he worked to suppress the independence movement and weaken emigre groups, particularly the Supreme Committee for the Liberation of Lithuania. He also organized pro-Moscow groups (including Yedinstvo) and removed or destroyed some of the sensitive KGB archives.

== Awards ==
- Order of the Red Star
- Order of the Friendship of Peoples
- Honorary Officer of State Security
