= Meelis Paavel =

Estonian geographer and politician

Meelis Paavel (born 17 June 1963 in Tartu) is an Estonian economic geographer and politician. He was a member of IX Riigikogu, representing the Social Democratic Party.
