= Innar Mäesalu =

Estonian politician (born 1970)

Innar Mäesalu (born 2 August 1970 in Võru) is an Estonian politician. He was a member of XII Riigikogu.
