= Hannes Maasel =

Estonian politician

Hannes Maasel (born 10 October 1951) is an Estonian politician. Since 1999 he has served as the governor of Hiiu County.

Political offices
Preceded by Tiit Laja	Governor of Hiiu County; 1999–present	Succeeded by Incumbent
