= Ülo Tulik =

Estonian politician (1957–2022)

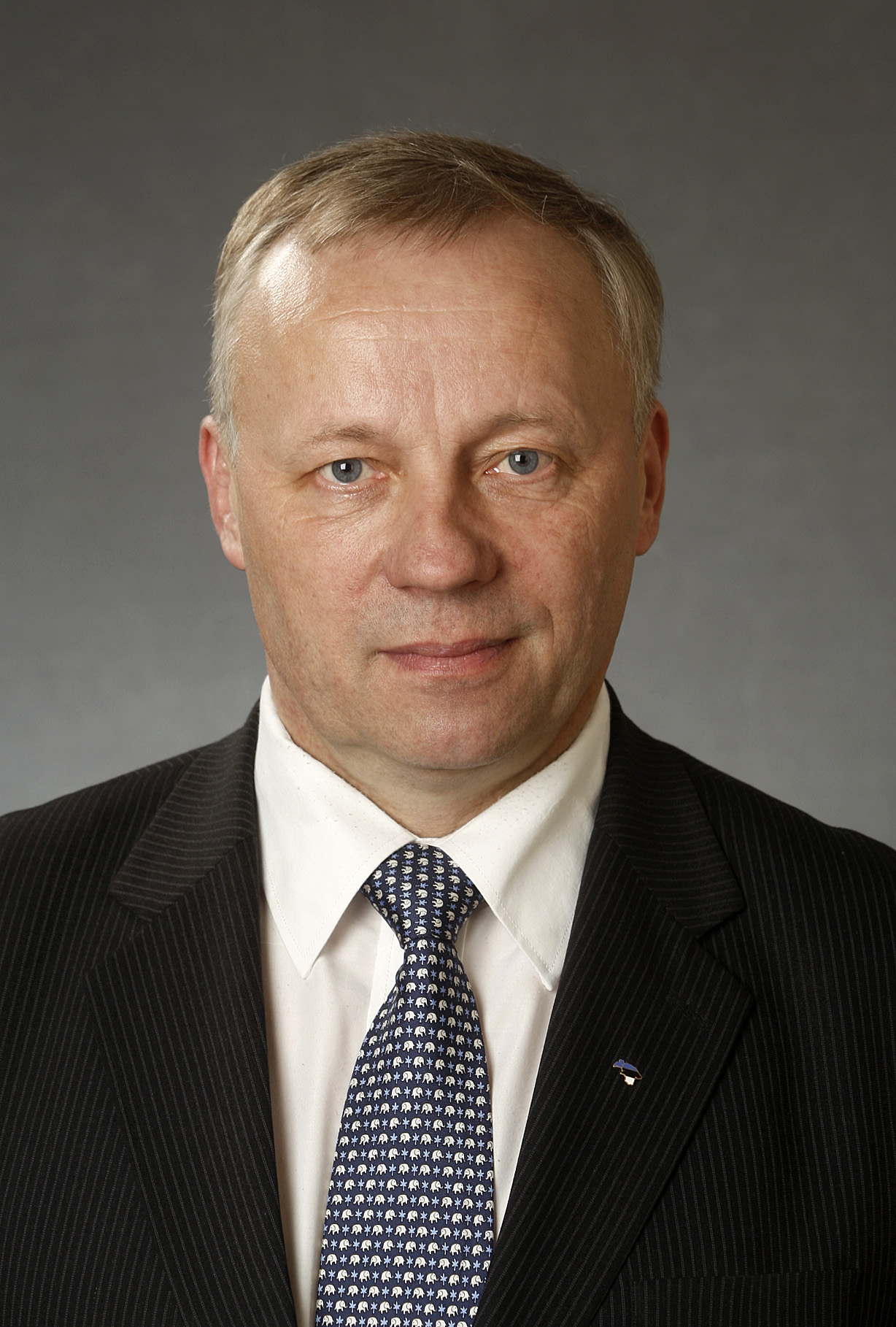

Member of Riigikogu
- In office 2011–2014

Mayor of Võru
- In office 2010–2011

Governor of Võru County
- In office 2005–2010

Personal details
- Born: 11 May 1957 Meremäe, Estonia
- Died: 30 April 2022 (aged 64)

Ülo Tulik (11 May 1957 – 30 April 2022) was an Estonian agronomist and politician. Tulik was born in Meremäe on 11 May 1957. He was the Võru County Governor from 2005 until 2010 and Mayor of Võru from 2010 until 2011, as well as a member of XII Riigikogu.
