= Tartu Applied Health Sciences University =

Vocational university in Tartu, Estonia

Coordinates: 58.3653°N 26.6913°E

- Established: 1811
- Rector: Jaan Looga
- Location: Tartu, Estonia
- Website: https://www.tartuh.ee/en

Tartu Applied Health Sciences University (Estonian: Tartu Tervishoiu Kõrgkool) is a higher education institution located at Nooruse 5 in Tartu.

It is the only higher education institution in Estonia that trains radiology technicians, bioanalysts, and environmental health specialists. The university offers six higher education programmes, six vocational education programmes, and three master’s degree programmes.

The current rector is Jaan Looga, who has served since 2026.

== History ==
Professor Christian Friedrich von Deutsch established a school for midwives in Tartu in 1811. Throughout its over 200-year history, the institution has existed under many different names and has provided instruction in several areas of specialisation and levels of study. In 2005, the school was renamed Tartu Health Care College.

Classes were previously conducted in various buildings until the college opened its own dedicated study building in 2011.

Since the beginning of 2025, the official English name of the college has been Tartu Applied Health Sciences University.

== Curricula ==
=== Vocational education programmes ===
- Care Worker
- Childminder
- Emergency Medical Technician
- Masseur / Masseuse
- Client Worker for People with Mental Health Problems
- Podologist

=== Higher education programmes ===
- Nursing
- Midwifery
- Radiography
- Physiotherapy
- Biomedical Laboratory Science
- Environmental Health Specialist

=== Master’s programmes ===
- Radiography
- Physiotherapy
- Health Sciences
