= Hannes Walter (historian) =

Estonian war historian

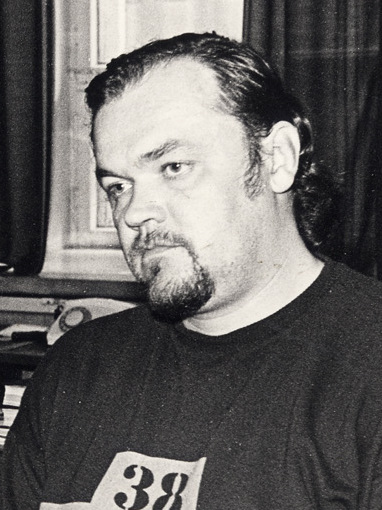
Hannes Walter in 1989

Hannes Walter (3 December 1952 – 26 November 2004) was an Estonian war historian.

Hannes Walter was born in Tallinn. In 1978 he graduated from Tartu University with a degree in history. In 2000, he received his PhD in cultural history from Tallinn University.

He was head of the Estonian History Museum's Maarjamäe branch. From 1997 to 2001 he worked as a ministerial advisor at the Estonian Defence Ministry. He became head of the Estonian War Museum in 2001, and held this position until his death in 2004.

== Works ==
- Ausalt ja avameelselt Landeswehri sõjast, Võnnu lahingust, Riia operatsioonist (1989)
- Ausalt & avameelselt Eesti suurmeestest (1990)
- Estonian Orders and Decorations (1998)
- They followed the orders. Faith of the Estonian officers (1999)
- General Johan laidoner. 115 years since born (1999)
- Leaders of the 2 World Wars, Part I (2000) co-author
- Leaders of the 2 World Wars, Part II (2000) co-author
- Leaders of the 2 World Wars, Part III (2000) co-author
- Vabadussõja kõrgemate juhtide memoriaali avamine Tallinna Kaitseväe kalmistul 28. novembril 2000. a. (2000)
- They gave everything. The officers who fell in the War of Liberation (2002)
- Hundred years of War (2002)
- Naval battles on the Baltic Sea 1918–1919. The British and Estonian Navy in the War of Liberation (2003)
- The Estonian State decorations (2003)
- Jüriööst teisiti (2004)

=== Articles ===
- Detsembrimäss oli Eesti huvides: 75 aasta tagune detsembrimäss Eestis oli Nõukogude Liidu globaalse agressiooni tüüpiline episood (1999) article
- Salaluure Eesti Vabariigi sündimise ajal. Luuramisi. (1999) article
- Husaar (2001) article
- About "The Holocaust Industry" (2002)
- 28. juulil 1914 algas 20. sajand (2004)

== Walters legacy ==
- Tagasi Euroopasse (1989) film script
- Kaks rahvast-üks meri (1990) film script
