= Margus Lepik =

Estonian politician (born 1969)

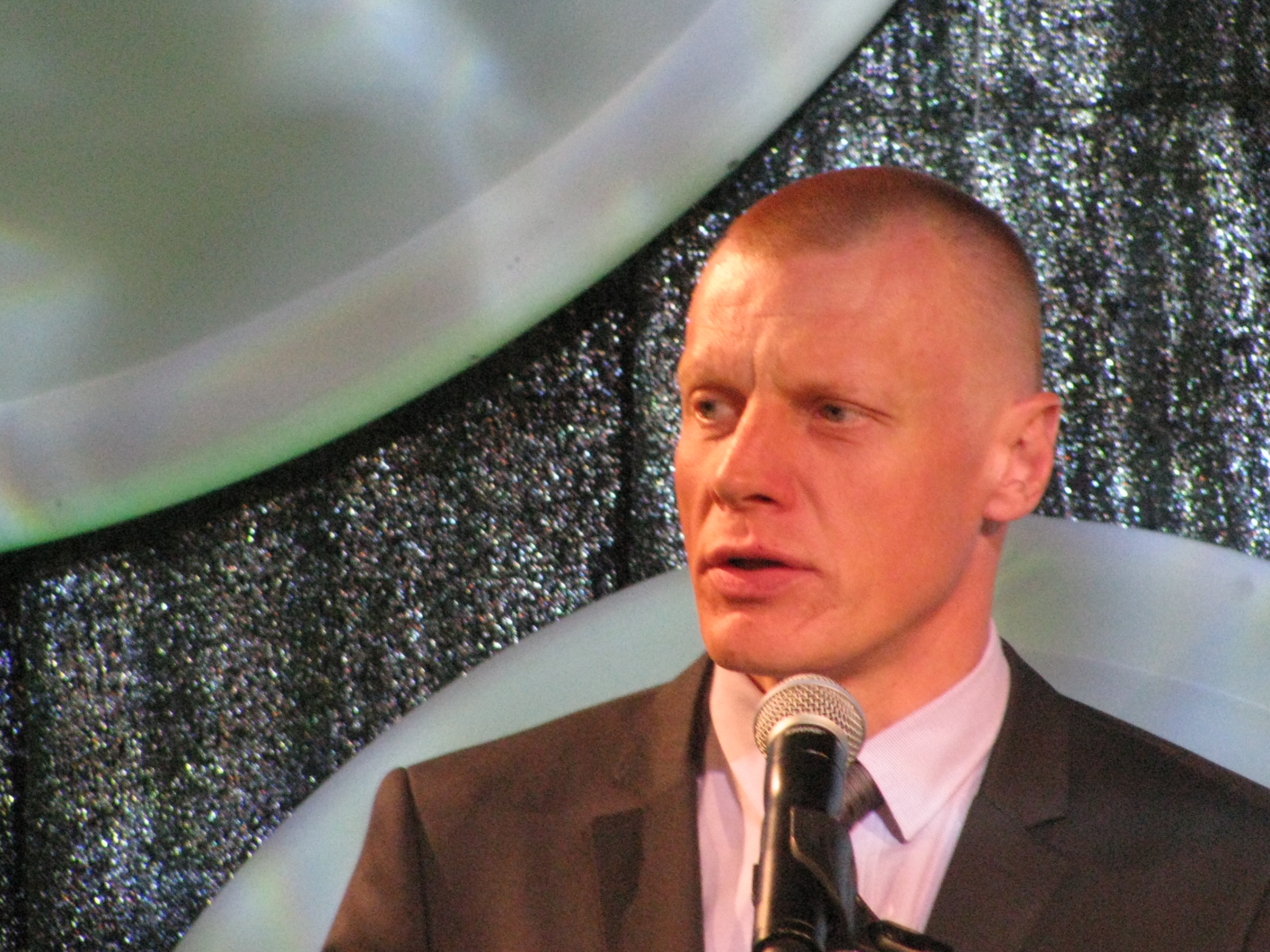
Lepik in 2012

Margus Lepik (born 14 March 1969, in Valga) is an Estonian politician. He was a member of XI Riigikogu, representing the Estonian Reform Party. From 1999 until 2007, he was the mayor of Valga. From 2010 until 2017, he was the governor of Valga County. From 2017 until 2020, he was the mayor of Valga Parish.
