= Värner Lootsmann =

Estonian politician (born 1945)

Värner Lootsmann (born August 18, 1945 in Kasispea) is an Estonian politician from Harju County.

== Political activity ==
Lootsmann was a member of the Estonian Liberal Democratic Party in 1990–91 and has been a member of the Estonian Centre Party since 1992. From 2006 to 2009, he was the county governor of Harju County.

== Sources ==
- (Estonian) "Varner Lootsmann may increase the Harju county governor". Estonian Public Broadcasting. December 8, 2005.
- (in English) "Ratas Too Passive, Says Regional Leader". Estonian Public Broadcasting. August 12, 2011.
- (Estonian) "Värner Lootsmann: on siililegi selge, et minu ametist vabastamine oli puhtalt poliitiline käik". Delfi.ee. June 30, 2011.
- (Estonian) "Centre Party of typical shot: Varner Lootsmann". Estonian Express. October 24, 2009.
