= Rein Randver =

Estonian politician (born 1956)

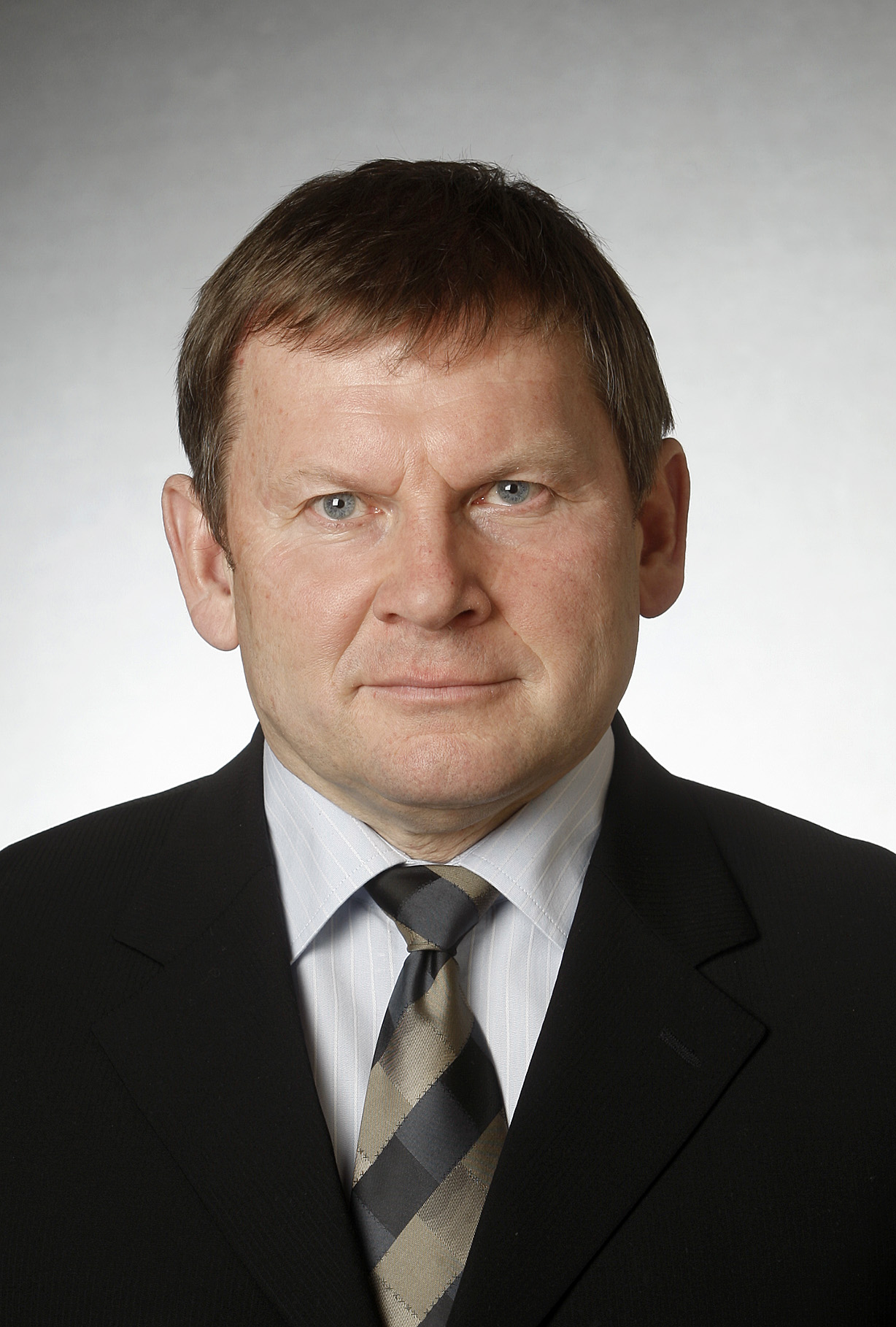
Rein Randver in 2011.

Rein Randver (born 24 June 1956 in Lüllemäe) is an Estonian politician. He was a member of the X, XII and XIII Riigikogu. From 2006 to 2007 he was Minister of the Environment.

He was a member of People's Union of Estonia.
