= Vabamu Museum of Occupations and Freedom =

Museum in Tallinn, Estonia

- Okupatsioonide ja vabaduse muuseum Vabamu
- Established: 1 July 2003
- Location: Toompea 8, Tallinn, Estonia
- Coordinates: 59°25′57.53″N 24°44′21.95″E
- Type: History museum, memorial museum
- Public transit access: Tõnismägi, TLT
- Website: www.vabamu.ee

The Vabamu or Vabamu Museum of Occupations and Freedom (Estonian: Okupatsioonide ja vabaduse muuseum Vabamu) tells the history of Estonia during and after the Soviet and Nazi occupations, arriving at the era of restoration of independence. The museum is located at the corner of Toompea St. and Kaarli Blvd Tallinn, Estonia. It was opened on July 1, 2003, and is dedicated to the 1940-1991 period in the history of Estonia, when the country was occupied by the Soviet Union, then Nazi Germany, and then again by the Soviet Union. During most of this time the country was known as the Estonian Soviet Socialist Republic.

The museum is managed by the Kistler-Ritso Estonian Foundation. The foundation is named after Olga Kistler-Ritso (1920–2013), the founder, the president, and financial supporter of the foundation. The members of the foundation started to collect articles for the museum and for historical study in 1999. Cooperation was set with Estonian International Commission for the Investigation of the Crimes Against Humanity, the Estonian State Commission on Examination of the Policies of Repression, Memento Association, the Research Centre of the Soviet Era in Estonia, as well as with the Russian Memorial Society dedicated to victims of Soviet repressions, and other organizations.

== Temporary Exhibition “Freedom Without Borders” ==
The permanent exhibition “Freedom Without Borders” explores the themes of occupation, resistance, freedom, and recovery in Estonia’s modern history. It is divided into five sections: Crimes Against Humanity, Estonians in the Free World, Life in Soviet Estonia, Restoration of Independence, and Freedom.

Crimes Against Humanity reflects on the tragic events and loss of humanity experienced during the occupations. Estonians in the Free World tells the story of Estonians who fled abroad and maintained their culture in exile. Life in Soviet Estonia examines both the establishment of the Soviet regime and the everyday realities of life under it. Restoration of Independence highlights the period from the 1980s Singing Revolution to Estonia’s accession to the European Union in 2004, focusing on the personal stories of eight ordinary individuals. The final section, Freedom, considers freedom as a balance between rights and responsibilities.

The exhibition was created in collaboration with several researchers and artists, including Sander Jürisson, Maarja Merivoo-Parro, Uku Lember, Aro Velmet, Daniel Vaarik, and Kaido Ole, with a sound installation by musician Taavi Tulev.

== Gallery ==
Facade of the museum (2019)

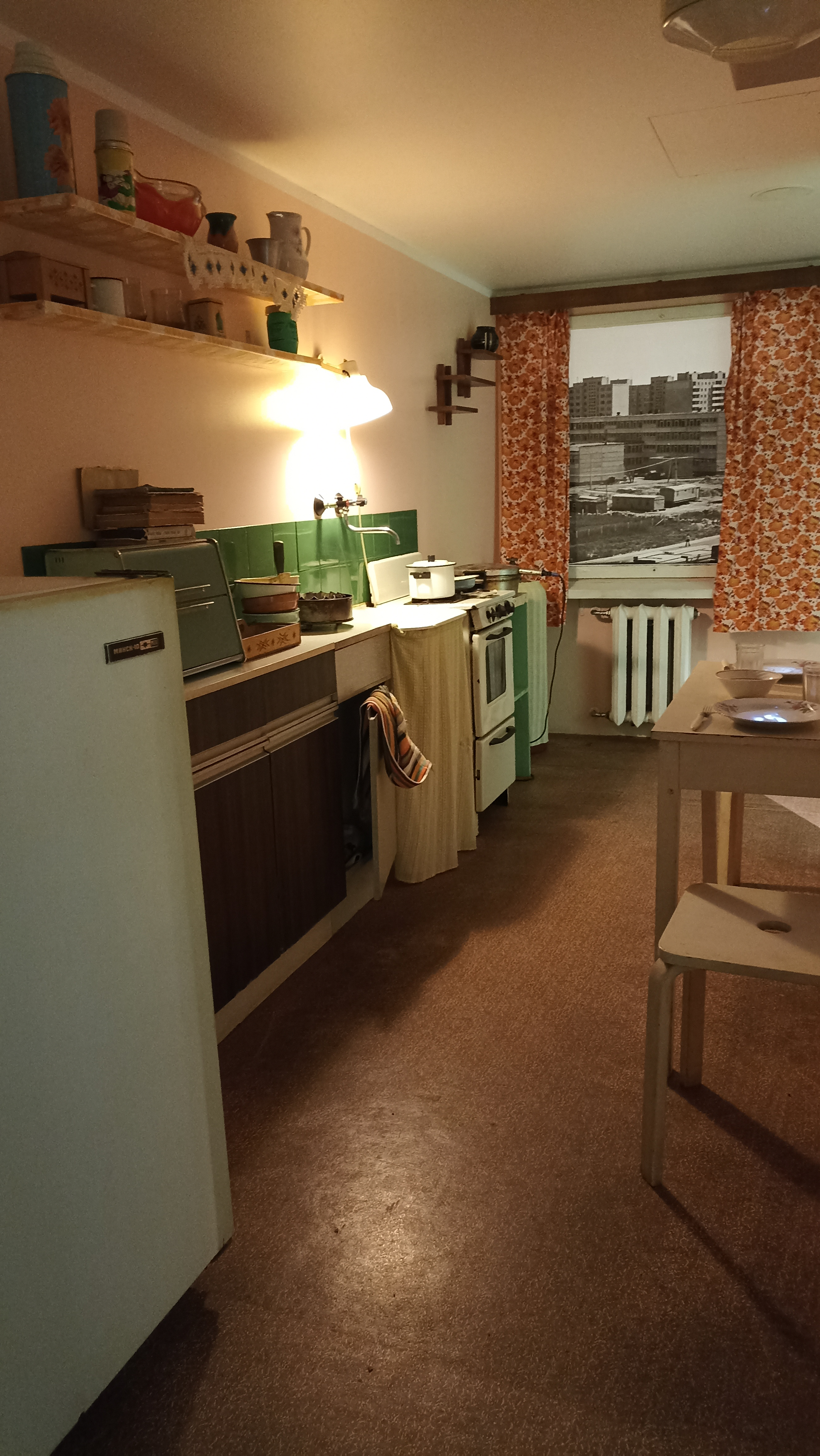
Theme room of "Everyday life" in the exhibition "Freedom Without Borders"

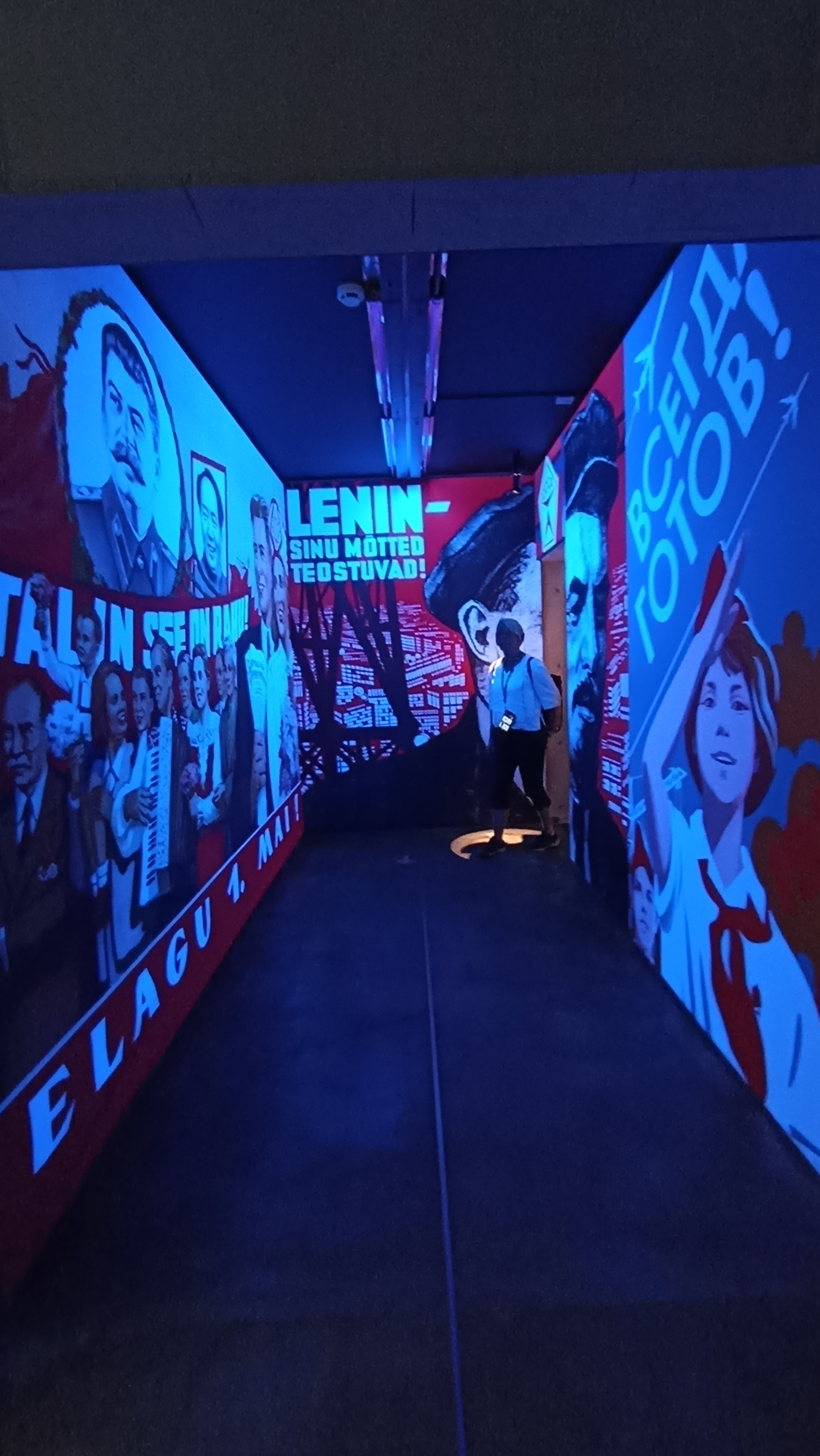
Theme room "Soviet Estonia" in the exhibition "Freedom Without Borders"

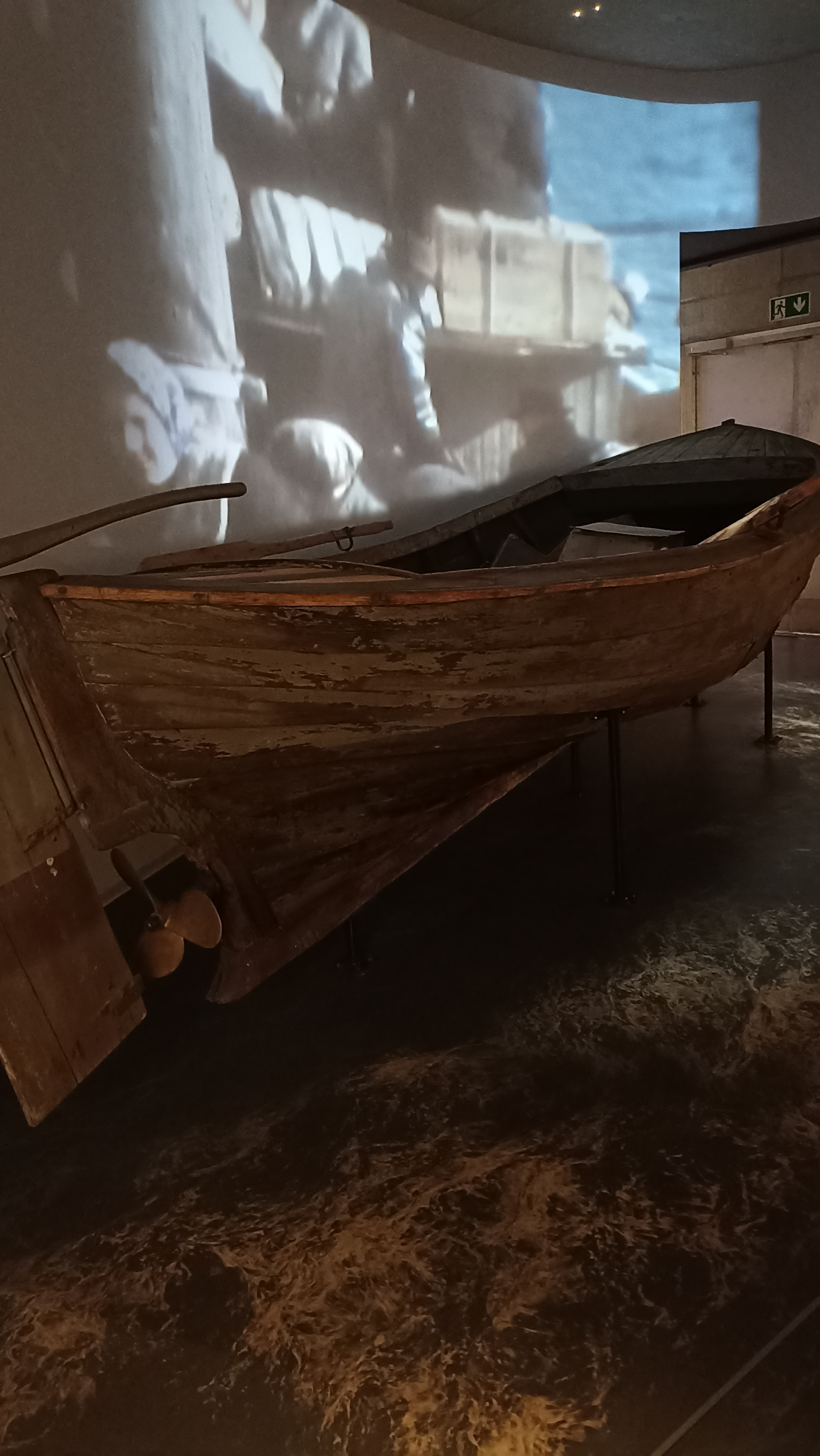
Theme room "Exile" in the exhibition "Freedom Without Borders"

== Recognition and feedback ==
In 2025, Vabamu received the Tripadvisor Travellers’ Choice Award, placing it among the top 10% of attractions worldwide based on visitor reviews.

== See also ==
- Museum of the Occupation of Latvia
