= List of Knight's Cross of the Iron Cross recipients (M) =

The Knight's Cross of the Iron Cross (German: Ritterkreuz des Eisernen Kreuzes) and its variants were the highest awards in the military and paramilitary forces of Nazi Germany during World War II. The Knight's Cross of the Iron Cross was awarded for a wide range of reasons and across all ranks, from a senior commander for skilled leadership of his troops in battle to a low-ranking soldier for a single act of extreme gallantry. A total of 7,321 awards were made between its first presentation on 30 September 1939 and its last bestowal on 17 June 1945. (Note: Großadmiral and President of Germany Karl Dönitz, Hitler's successor as Head of State (Staatsoberhaupt) and Supreme Commander of the Armed Forces, had ordered the cessation of all promotions and awards as of 11 May 1945 (Dönitz-decree). Consequently the last Knight's Cross awarded to Oberleutnant zur See of the Reserves Georg-Wolfgang Feller on 17 June 1945 must therefore be considered a de facto but not de jure hand-out.) This number is based on the analysis and acceptance of the order commission of the Association of Knight's Cross Recipients (AKCR). Presentations were made to members of the three military branches of the Wehrmacht—the Heer (Army), Kriegsmarine (Navy) and Luftwaffe (Air Force)—as well as the Waffen-SS, the Reichsarbeitsdienst (RAD—Reich Labour Service) and the Volkssturm (German national militia). There were also 43 recipients in the military forces of allies of the Third Reich.

These recipients are listed in the 1986 edition of Walther-Peer Fellgiebel's book, Die Träger des Ritterkreuzes des Eisernen Kreuzes 1939–1945 — The Bearers of the Knight's Cross of the Iron Cross 1939–1945. Fellgiebel was the former chairman and head of the order commission of the AKCR. In 1996, the second edition of this book was published with an addendum delisting 11 of these original recipients. Author Veit Scherzer has cast doubt on a further 193 of these listings. The majority of the disputed recipients had received the award in 1945, when the deteriorating situation of Germany in the final days of World War II in Europe left a number of nominations incomplete and pending in various stages of the approval process.

Listed here are the 118 Knight's Cross recipients of the Wehrmacht and Waffen-SS whose last name starts with "M". (Note: Erich von Lewinski called Erich von Manstein is not counted here. He is counted among the 386 recipients whose last name starts with "L" (see List of Knight's Cross of the Iron Cross recipients (L)).) Fellgiebel himself delisted one and Scherzer has challenged the validity of seven more of these listings. The recipients are ordered alphabetically by last name. The rank listed is the recipient's rank at the time the Knight's Cross was awarded.

== Background ==
The Knight's Cross of the Iron Cross and its higher grades were based on four separate enactments. The first enactment, Reichsgesetzblatt I S. 1573 of 1 September 1939 instituted the Iron Cross (Eisernes Kreuz), the Knight's Cross of the Iron Cross and the Grand Cross of the Iron Cross (Großkreuz des Eisernen Kreuzes). Article 2 of the enactment mandated that the award of a higher class be preceded by the award of all preceding classes. As the war progressed, some of the recipients of the Knight's Cross distinguished themselves further and a higher grade, the Knight's Cross of the Iron Cross with Oak Leaves (Ritterkreuz des Eisernen Kreuzes mit Eichenlaub), was instituted. The Oak Leaves, as they were commonly referred to, were based on the enactment Reichsgesetzblatt I S. 849 of 3 June 1940. In 1941, two higher grades of the Knight's Cross were instituted. The enactment Reichsgesetzblatt I S. 613 of 28 September 1941 introduced the Knight's Cross of the Iron Cross with Oak Leaves and Swords (Ritterkreuz des Eisernen Kreuzes mit Eichenlaub und Schwertern) and the Knight's Cross of the Iron Cross with Oak Leaves, Swords and Diamonds (Ritterkreuz des Eisernen Kreuzes mit Eichenlaub, Schwertern und Brillanten). At the end of 1944 the final grade, the Knight's Cross of the Iron Cross with Golden Oak Leaves, Swords, and Diamonds (Ritterkreuz des Eisernen Kreuzes mit goldenem Eichenlaub, Schwertern und Brillanten), based on the enactment Reichsgesetzblatt 1945 I S. 11 of 29 December 1944, became the final variant of the Knight's Cross authorized.

== Recipients ==
Knight's Cross of the Iron Cross (M)
Service	Number of presentations	Posthumous presentations
Heer	293	17
Kriegsmarine	29	1
Luftwaffe	113	10
Waffen-SS	22	1

The Oberkommando der Wehrmacht (Supreme Command of the Armed Forces) kept separate Knight's Cross lists for the Heer (Army), Kriegsmarine (Navy), Luftwaffe (Air Force) and Waffen-SS. Within each of these lists a unique sequential number was assigned to each recipient. The same numbering paradigm was applied to the higher grades of the Knight's Cross, one list per grade. Of the 457 awards made to servicemen whose last name starts with "M", 46 were later awarded the Knight's Cross of the Iron Cross with Oak Leaves, nine the Knight's Cross of the Iron Cross with Oak Leaves and Swords and five the Knight's Cross of the Iron Cross with Oak Leaves, Swords and Diamonds; 29 presentations were made posthumously. Heer members received 293 of the medals; 29 went to the Kriegsmarine, 113 to the Luftwaffe, and 22 to the Waffen-SS. The sequential numbers greater than 843 for the Knight's Cross of the Iron Cross with Oak Leaves and 143 for the Knight's Cross of the Iron Cross with Oak Leaves and Swords are unofficial and were assigned by the Association of Knight's Cross Recipients (AKCR) and are therefore denoted in parentheses.

This along with the + (plus) indicates that a higher grade of Knight's Cross was awarded as well.
This along with the * (asterisk) indicates that the Knight's Cross was awarded posthumously.
This along with the ! (exclamation mark) indicates that author Walther-Peer Fellgiebel has expressed doubt regarding the veracity and formal correctness of the listing.
This along with the ? (question mark) indicates that author Veit Scherzer has expressed doubt regarding the veracity and formal correctness of the listing.

Name	Service	Rank	Role and unit (Note: For an explanation of the various naming schemes used by the Luftwaffe, Heer, Kriegsmarine and Waffen-SS refer to nomenclature used by the Wehrmacht and Waffen-SS.)	Date of award	Notes	Image
Johann Maas	Heer	Fahnenjunker-Wachtmeister	Vorgeschobener Beobachter (forward observer) in the 12./Artillerie-Regiment 104	25 October 1944* (Note: According to Scherzer on 30 September 1944.)	Killed in action 26 July 1944	—
Heinz Maaz	Heer	Obergefreiter	Group leader in the 3./Panzer-Aufklärungs-Abteilung "Großdeutschland"	4 October 1944	—	—
Franz-Wilhelm Mach	Heer	Major	Commander of the I./Kuban-Kosaken-Regiment 4 (Note: According to Scherzer as commander of the I./Kuban-Kosaken-Reiter-Regiment 4.)	30 April 1945	—	—
Hans-Heinrich Mach	Heer	Oberleutnant	Chief of the 7./Infanterie-Regiment 220	15 November 1941	—	—
Heinz Macher+	Waffen-SS	SS-Untersturmführer	Leader of the 16.(Pi)/SS-Panzergrenadier-Regiment "Deutschland"	3 April 1943	Awarded 554th Oak Leaves 19 August 1944	—
Robert Macher? (Note: Robert Macher received confirmation of the Knight's Cross of the Iron Cross presentation via radio transmission from the Dönitz Government to Armeeoberkommando Ostpreußen (AOK Ostpreußen—Army High Command East Prussia) on 14 May 1945 according to Walther-Peer Fellgiebel. The AOK was still reachable until 12:00 noon on this day. This presentation is considered a direct presentation. There is no record of this presentation in the Heerespersonalamt (HPA —Army Staff Office). This presentation is void since it was made after 8 May 1945.)	Heer	Generalmajor	Chief of staff of AOK Ostpreußen	14 May 1945	—	—
Werner Machold	Luftwaffe	Oberfeldwebel	Pilot in the 7./Jagdgeschwader 2 "Richthofen" (Note: According to Scherzer as pilot in the I./Jagdgeschwader 2 "Richthofen".)	5 September 1940	—	
Siegfried Macholz	Heer	Generalleutnant	Commander of the 49. Infanterie-Division	16 October 1944	—	—
August Machowsky	Heer	Oberleutnant	Chief of the Pionier-Kompanie/Jäger-Regiment 28 (Note: According to Scherzer as chief of the 17.(Pionier)/Jäger-Regiment 28.)	30 April 1945	—	—
Eberhard von Mackensen+	Heer	General der Kavallerie	Commanding general of the III. Armeekorps (motorized)	27 July 1941	Awarded 95th Oak Leaves 26 May 1942	
Anton Mader	Luftwaffe	Major	Gruppenkommandeur of the II./Jagdgeschwader 77	23 July 1942 (Note: According to Scherzer on 15 July 1942.)	—	—
Anton-Josef Mader	Luftwaffe	Feldwebel	Pilot and observer in the 5.(H)/Aufklärungs-Gruppe 11 (Note: According to Scherzer as pilot and observer in Aufklärungs-Gruppe 11.)	26 March 1944	—	—
Franz Mader	Heer	Major of the Reserves	Commander of the I./Grenadier-Regiment 576	12 December 1944	—	—
Hans Mader	Luftwaffe	Oberleutnant	Staffelkapitän of the 4./Kampfgeschwader 54	3 September 1942	—	—
Hellmuth Mäder+	Heer	Major	Commander of the III./Infanterie-Regiment 522	3 April 1942	Awarded 560th Oak Leaves 27 August 1944; 143rd Swords 18 April 1945	—
Hermann Maek	Heer	Oberleutnant	Leader of the 5./Infanterie-Regiment 453	20 March 1942	—	—
Rolf Maempel	Heer	Oberst	Commander of Panzergrenadier-Regiment 125 (Note: According to Scherzer as commander of Panzergrenadier-Regiment 140.)	5 December 1943	—	—
Manfred Mänhardt	Luftwaffe	Oberleutnant	Observer in the 4.(F)/Aufklärungs-Gruppe 122 (Note: According to Scherzer as observer in the Aufklärungsstaffe 4.(F)/122.)	9 June 1944	—	—
Jürgen Freiherr von Maercken zu Geerath	Heer	Oberleutnant	Chief of the 1./Panzer-Regiment 36	17 September 1941	—	—
Xaver Maerz	Heer	Oberfeldwebel	Zugführer (platoon leader) in the 6./Infanterie-Regiment 34	27 May 1942	—	—
Friedrich-Wilhelm Maes	Kriegsmarine	Kapitänleutnant (M.A.)	Battery chief of the battery "Völtzendorf" in the Marine Flak-Abteilung 219 (9. Marine-Flak-Regiment) (Note: According to Scherzer as chief of battery "Völtzendorf"/Marine Flak-Abteilung 219.)	25 March 1945*	Killed in action 19 March 1945	—
Heinz Maetzel	Luftwaffe	Hauptmann	Staffelkapitän of the 1./Fernaufklärungs-Gruppe 4 (Note: According to Scherzer as Staffelkapitän of the Aufklärungsstaffel 1.(F)/33.)	5 April 1944	—	—
Christoph Magawly	Heer	Hauptmann (Note: According to Scherzer as Hauptmann of the Reserves.)	Commander of the II./Grenadier-Regiment 287	15 March 1944	—	—
Rolf Mager	Luftwaffe	Hauptmann	Commander of the II./Fallschirmjäger-Regiment 6	31 October 1944	—	A man wearing a peaked cap and military uniform with various military decorations.
Friedrich-Wilhelm Magerfleisch	Heer	Gefreiter	In the 3.(schwere)/Schnelle-Abteilung 376 (Note: According to Scherzer in the 3./Schnelle-Abteilung 376.)	20 January 1943*	Killed in action 8 December 1942	—
Alois Magg	Luftwaffe	Oberleutnant	Pilot in the 9./Kampfgeschwader 2 (Note: According to Scherzer as pilot in the III./Kampfgeschwader 2.)	5 September 1944	—	—
Hanns Magold	Heer	Oberleutnant	Chief of the 1./Sturmgeschütz-Abteilung "Großdeutschland"	3 April 1943	—	—
Adolf Mahler	Heer	Oberst of the Reserves	Commander of Artillerie-Regiment 30	23 October 1944	—	—
Helmut Mahlke	Luftwaffe	Hauptmann	Gruppenkommandeur of the III./Sturzkampfgeschwader 1	16 July 1941	—	
Friedrich Mahlmann	Heer	Leutnant of the Reserves	Leader of the II./Grenadier-Regiment 587	17 March 1944	—	—
Heinrich Mahlstedt	Heer	Oberfeldwebel	Zugführer (platoon leader) in the 3./Panzer-Abteilung 8	30 September 1944*	Died of wounds 27 August 1944	—
Friedrich-Karl Mahn	Luftwaffe	Hauptmann	Officer zur besonderen Verwendung (for special assignments) in the 1./Nahaufklärungs-Gruppe 5	24 January 1945	—	—
Werner Mahn	Heer	Oberfeldwebel	Zugführer (platoon leader) in the 2./Panzer-Regiment 10	8 February 1943	—	—
Heinrich Mahnken	Heer	Rittmeister of the Reserves	Commander of the Aufklärungs-Abteilung 299	5 April 1942	—	—
Emil Mai	Heer	Leutnant of the Reserves	Zugführer (platoon leader) in the 1./Grenadier-Regiment 200 (motorized)	16 November 1944	—	—
Kurt Maier+	Luftwaffe	Oberleutnant	Observer and aircraft commander in the 3./Kampfgeschwader 4 "General Wever" (Note: According to Scherzer as pilot and observer in the I./Kampfgeschwader 4 "General Wever".)	16 November 1942	Awarded 674th Oak Leaves 6 December 1944	—
Eberhard Maisel (Note: According to Scherzer name is spelled Eberhard Meisel.)	Heer	Oberfeldwebel	Zugführer (platoon leader) in the 2./Grenadier-Regiment 118	23 July 1943	—	—
Ernst Maisel	Heer	Oberst	Commander of Infanterie-Regiment 42	6 April 1942	—	—
Paul Maitla	Waffen-SS	Waffen-Hauptsturmführer	Leader of the I./Waffen-Grenadier-Regiment 45 of the SS (estn. Nr. 1) (Note: According to Scherzer as leader of the I./Waffen-Grenadier-Regiment of the SS 45 (estn. Nr. 1).)	23 August 1944	—	—
Wilhelm Makrocki	Luftwaffe	Hauptmann	Gruppenkommandeur of the I./Zerstörergeschwader 26 "Horst Wessel"	6 October 1940	—	—
Wilhelm von Malachowski+	Heer	Oberleutnant	Chief of the 2./Sturmgeschütz-Abteilung 189	30 January 1942	Awarded 206th Oak Leaves 6 March 1943	—
Robert-Georg Freiherr von Malapert+ called Neufville	Luftwaffe	Oberleutnant	Staffelkapitän of the 5./Sturzkampfgeschwader 1	6 January 1942	Awarded 99th Oak Leaves 8 June 1942	—
Einhart Malguth	Heer	Oberleutnant	Regiment adjutant of Panzer-Regiment 35 (Note: According to Scherzer as adjutant of Panzer-Regiment 35.)	11 May 1942	—	—
Hans Malkomes	Waffen-SS	SS-Obersturmführer	Chief of the 2./SS-Panzer-Regiment 1 "Leibstandarte SS Adolf Hitler" (Note: According to Scherzer as chief of the 2./SS-Panzer-Regiment 1.)	30 October 1944	—	—
Karl Mally	Heer	Hauptmann	Leader of the II./Grenadier-Regiment 191	12 March 1944	—	—
Wolfgang von Malotki	Heer	Oberleutnant of the Reserves	Chief of the 3./Grenadier-Regiment 45	7 March 1943	—	—
Berndt-Joachim Freiherr von Maltzahn	Heer	Major	Commander of Panzergrenadier-Regiment 59	14 February 1945	—	—
Günther Freiherr von Maltzahn+	Luftwaffe	Hauptmann	Gruppenkommandeur of the II./Jagdgeschwader 53	30 December 1940	Awarded 29th Oak Leaves 24 July 1941	
Hermann Mangels	Heer	Leutnant of the Reserves	Zugführer (platoon leader) in the Pionier-Bataillon 189	17 March 1945	—	—
Johannes Manitius	Heer	Oberstleutnant	Commander of Infanterie-Regiment 386	3 April 1942	—	—
Hans-Horst Manitz	Heer	Hauptmann of the Reserves	Commander of the I./Grenadier-Regiment 274	23 August 1944	—	—
Fritz Mann	Heer	Leutnant	Zugführer (platoon leader) of the pioneer platoon in the Stabskompanie/Grenadier-Regiment 274	6 April 1944	—	—
Martin Mann	Heer	Oberstleutnant	Commander of Grenadier-Regiment 187	23 October 1944	—	—
Werner Manns	Heer	Hauptmann	Commander of the III./Grenadier-Regiment 96	13 January 1944	—	—
Erich von Manstein	—	—	—	—	see von Lewinski called von Manstein	Black-and-white portrait of an older man wearing a military uniform, his hair is combed back.
Gerhard Mantel	Heer	Oberleutnant	Chief of the 2./Panzer-Jäger-Abteilung 52	14 April 1945	—	—
Hasso von Manteuffel+	Heer	Oberst	Commander of Schützen-Regiment 6	31 December 1941	Awarded 332nd Oak Leaves 23 November 1943; 50th Swords 22 February 1944; 24th Diamonds 18 February 1945	Black-and-white portrait of a man in semi profile wearing a peaked cap, military uniform with an Iron Cross and binoculars suspended from his neck.
Karl-Heinz Marbach	Kriegsmarine	Oberleutnant zur See	Commander of U-953	22 July 1944	—	—
Paul Marbach	Heer	Major of the Reserves	Commander of the I./Grenadier-Regiment 217	20 February 1943	—	—
Oskar Marchel	Heer	Unteroffizier	Zugführer (platoon leader) in the 3./Grenadier-Regiment 45	15 April 1944*	Killed in action 10 March 1944	—
Erich Marcks+	Heer	Generalleutnant	Commander of the 101. leichte Infanterie-Division	26 June 1941	Awarded 503rd Oak Leaves 24 June 1944	
Werner Marcks+	Heer	Oberstleutnant	Leader of Kampfgruppe "Marcks" Panzer Armee Afrika (Note: According to Scherzer as commander of Schützen-Regiment 104 and leader of a Kampfgruppe in Panzer Armee Afrika.)	2 February 1942	Awarded 593rd Oak Leaves 21 September 1944	—
Werner Marienfeld (Note: According to Scherzer name is Walter Marienfeld.)	Luftwaffe	Oberstleutnant	Geschwaderkommodore of Kampfgeschwader 54	27 November 1941	—	Black-and-white portrait of a man wearing a military uniform with various military decoration displayed at his neck.
Willy Marienfeld+	Heer	Major of the Reserves (Note: According to Scherzer as Hauptmann.)	Commander of the II./Infanterie-Regiment 123	17 August 1942	Awarded 482nd Oak Leaves 25 May 1944	—
Hermann Maringgele	Waffen-SS	SS-Hauptscharführer	Zugführer (platoon leader) in the 2./SS-Kavallerie-Regiment 15 "Florian Geyer" (Note: According to Scherzer as Zugführer (platoon leader) in the 2./SS-Kavallerie-Regiment 15.)	21 February 1945	—	—
Paul Markgraf	Heer	Oberleutnant	Leader of Panzer-Jäger-Abteilung 40	3 January 1943	—	—
[Dr.] Friedrich Markworth (Note: The brackets around the doctor title [Dr.] denotes that the academic title was attained after the Knight's Cross of the Iron Cross was awarded.)	Kriegsmarine	Kapitänleutnant	Commander of U-66	8 July 1943	—	—
Walter Markworth	Heer	Oberleutnant	Leader of the II./Grenadier-Regiment 12	14 April 1945	—	—
Heinz Marquardt	Luftwaffe	Fahnenjunker-Oberfeldwebel (Note: According to Scherzer as Oberfeldwebel.)	Pilot in the 13./Jagdgeschwader 51 "Mölders"	18 November 1944	—	—
Herbert Marre	Heer	Oberleutnant (Note: According to Scherzer as Oberleutnant of the Reserves.)	Chief of the 13./Grenadier-Regiment 424	17 April 1945	—	—
Günther Marreck	Heer	Hauptmann of the Reserves	Leader of the II./Grenadier-Regiment 422	15 April 1944	—	—
Hans Marscholek	Luftwaffe	Oberleutnant	Battery leader in the Fallschirm-Flak-Abteilung 5 (Note: According to Scherzer as battery leader in the 5./Fallschirm-Flak-Abteilung 5.)	31 October 1944	—	—
Hans-Joachim Marseille+	Luftwaffe	Leutnant	Pilot in the 3./Jagdgeschwader 27	22 February 1942	Awarded 97th Oak Leaves 6 June 1942; 12th Swords 18 June 1942; 4th Diamonds 3 September 1942	The head and shoulders of a young man, shown in semi-profile. He wears a military uniform with an Iron Cross displayed at the front of his shirt collar. His hair appears blond and short and combed back, his nose is long and straight, and his facial expression is determined but smiling; looking to the left of the camera.
Alfred Martens	Heer	Oberleutnant of the Reserves	Leader of the I./Grenadier-Regiment 586	28 November 1943	—	—
Egbert Martens	Heer	Oberst	Commander of Werfer-Regiment 70 (motorized) (Note: According to Scherzer as commander of Werfer-Regiment 70.)	3 November 1944	—	—
Otto Martens	Heer	Hauptmann of the Reserves	Commander of Panzer-Jäger-Abteilung 72	23 November 1941	—	—
Ekkehard Martienssen	Kriegsmarine	Oberleutnant zur See of the Reserves	Commander of Vorpostenboot VP-203 in the 2. Vorpostenflottille	29 June 1944	—	—
Christian Martin	Heer	Hauptmann	Commander of Panzer-Jäger-Abteilung 521	20 January 1943	—	—
Heinz Martin	Heer	Leutnant of the Reserves	Aide-de-camp in the Stab of Infanterie-Regiment 520	20 December 1941	—	—
Wolfgang Martin	Luftwaffe	Oberfeldwebel	Pilot in the 6./Kampfgeschwader 3 "Lützow"	30 December 1942	—	—
Robert Martinek+	Heer	Generalmajor	Commander of the 267. Infanterie-Division	26 December 1941	Awarded 388th Oak Leaves 10 February 1944	—
Egon von der Marwitz	Heer	Oberleutnant	Chief of the 3./Grenadier-Regiment 44	12 August 1944	—	—
Xaver Marzluf	Heer	Major	Commander of the II./Panzergrenadier-Regiment 103	9 July 1944*	Killed in action 3 June 1944	—
Lino (Arzelino) Masarié	Waffen-SS	SS-Hauptsturmführer	Leader of SS-Panzer-Aufklärungs-Abteilung 3 "Totenkopf" (Note: According to Scherzer as leader Aufklärungs-Abteilung of the "Totenkopf"-Division.)	3 April 1943	—	A man wearing a military uniform, peaked cap and neck order, in the shape of a cross. His cap has an emblem in shape of a human skull and crossed bones.
Willi Masemann	Heer	Unteroffizier	In the 4./Panzer-Jäger-Abteilung 15 (L)	25 June 1944 (Note: According to Scherzer on 24 June 1944.)	—	—
Wilhelm Massa	Heer	Oberleutnant of the Reserves	Chief of the 5./Grenadier-Regiment 35 (motorized)	21 January 1945	—	—
Dipl.-Ing. Dietrich Freiherr von Massenbach	Luftwaffe	Major	Gruppenkommandeur of the II./Kampfgeschwader 4 "General Wever"	27 August 1940	—	—
Horst Massow	Heer	Hauptmann	Company chief in the Fähnrichs-Regiment 3 of Division "Märkisch Friedland" (Note: According to Scherzer as chief of the 2./Fähnrichs-Infanterie-Regiment 3.)	11 March 1945	—	—
Alfred Matern+	Heer	Oberfeldwebel	Zugführer (platoon leader) in the 5./Füsilier-Regiment 22	4 September 1943	Awarded 784th Oak Leaves 16 March 1945	—
Karl-Heinrich Matern	Luftwaffe	Hauptmann	Gruppenkommandeur of the II./Zerstörergeschwader 1	9 October 1943*	Killed in action 8 October 1943	—
Kurt Matern	Heer	Major	Leader of Infanterie-Regiment 39	14 September 1942	—	—
Friedrich Materna	Heer	Generalleutnant	Commander of the 45. Infanterie-Division	5 August 1940	—	—
Siegmund Matheja? (Note: No evidence of the award can be found in the German Federal Archives. Von Seemen listed Siegmund Matheja in his second edition and noted: "No evidence in the German Federal Archives, see history of "Großdeutschland" division". The history describes the battles at Bisamberg near Korneuburg mid April 1945 briefly. Here Matheja presumably destroyed six enemy tanks, Matheja and his actions however are not described in the division's history. The order commission of the Association of Knight's Cross Recipients (AKCR) processed this case in 1981 and decided "Knight's Cross yes, 6 May 1945". The presentation date is an assumption of the AKCR. Unfortunately Matheja, a member of the AKCR, himself did nothing to help clarify the situation. Twice he failed to respond to a letter (24 July and 22 August 2004) from the chairman of the AKCR.)	Heer	Unteroffizier	In the Panzerhaubitzen-Abteilung/Führer-Grenadier-Division "Großdeutschland"	6 May 1945	—	—
Josef Mathes	Heer	Oberwachtmeister	Zugführer (platoon leader) in the 3./Sturmgeschütz-Brigade 280	4 October 1944*	Killed in action 19 September 1944	—
Wolfgang Mathes	Heer	Leutnant of the Reserves	Leader of the 5./Grenadier-Regiment 42	9 January 1945	—	—
Walter Matoni	Luftwaffe	Hauptmann	Gruppenkommandeur of the II./Jagdgeschwader 2 "Richthofen" (Note: According to Scherzer as Gruppenkommandeur of the I./Jagdgeschwader 2 "Richthofen".)	16 December 1944	—	—
Kurt Matschoß	Heer	Major	Leader of a Kampfgruppe in the fortress Abschnittskommando "Bärenfänger" in Berlin (Note: According to Scherzer as leader of a Kampfgruppe in Verteidigungs-Abschnitt "A" (defensive sector "A").)	28 April 1945	—	—
Franz Mattenklott	Heer	Generalleutnant	Commander of the 72. Infanterie-Division	23 November 1941	—	—
Walter Mattern	Waffen-SS	SS-Obersturmführer	Leader of the 7./SS-Panzer-Regiment 3 "Totenkopf" (Note: According to Scherzer as leader of the 7./SS-Panzer-Regiment 3.)	20 October 1944	—	—
Leopold Matthess	Heer	Oberleutnant	Chief of the 4./MG-Bataillon 13	9 May 1940	—	—
Dr. rer. pol. Werner Matthis	Heer	Oberst	Commander of Grenadier-Regiment 428	22 January 1944	—	—
Walter Mattusch? (Note: No evidence of the award can be found in the German Federal Archives. The award was unlawfully presented by SS-Oberstgruppenführer Sepp Dietrich. The date is taken from the announcement made by the 6. SS-Panzerarmee.)	Waffen-SS	SS-Hauptsturmführer	Commander of the II./SS-Panzergrenadier-Regiment 3 "Deutschland"	6 May 1945	—	—
Erich Matuschewitz	Heer	Unteroffizier	In the 2./Grenadier-Regiment 232	30 September 1944	—	—
Ingwer (Jens) Matzen	Kriegsmarine	Korvettenkapitän	Chief of the 6. Schnellbootflottille	2 May 1945	—	—
Othmar Matzke	Heer	Major	Commander of Pionier-Bataillon 211	18 November 1944	—	—
Gerhard Matzky	Heer	Generalleutnant	Commander of the 21. Infanterie-Division	5 April 1944	—	—
Theodor Freiherr von Mauchenheim called Bechtolsheim	Kriegsmarine	Kapitän zur See	Chief of the 8. Zerstörerflottille "Narvik"	3 July 1944	—	—
Wolfgang Maucke	Heer	Oberst	Commander of Panzergrenadier-Regiment 115	18 February 1945	—	—
Heinrich Maurer	Heer	Obergefreiter	Group leader in the Stabskompanie/Panzergrenadier-Regiment 125	6 October 1944	—	—
Otto Maurer	Kriegsmarine	Korvettenkapitän	Chief of the 12. Räumbootflottille	3 July 1943	—	—
Stefan Maurer	Heer	Oberfeldwebel	Zugführer (platoon leader) in the 8./Grenadier-Regiment 35 (motorized)	16 August 1943	—	—
Anselm Maurus	Luftwaffe	Leutnant	Zugführer (platoon leader) in the 10./leichte Flak-Regiment 411 (self-motorized) (Note: According to Scherzer as Zugführer (platoon leader) in the 10./leichte Flak-Abteilung 411 (self-motorized).)	30 September 1944	—	—
August Maus	Kriegsmarine	Kapitänleutnant	Commander of U-185	21 September 1943	—	
Dr. med. dent. Karl Mauss+	Heer	Oberstleutnant	Commander of the II./Schützen-Regiment 69	26 November 1941	Awarded 335th Oak Leaves 24 November 1943; 101st Swords 23 October 1944; 26th Diamonds 15 April 1945	Mauss stands inside his vehicle on one of his daily trips to the front.
Otto Mauz	Heer	Oberfeldwebel	Zugführer (platoon leader) in the 3./Heeres-Pionier-Bataillon 671 (motorized) (Note: According to Scherzer as Zugführer (platoon leader) in the 3./Heeres-Pionier-Bataillon 671.)	9 December 1944	—	—
Johann May	Heer	Oberleutnant	Leader of the III./Gebirgsjäger-Regiment 138	25 January 1943	—	—
Otfried Maydorn	Heer	Oberst	Commander of Grenadier-Regiment 554 (Note: According to Scherzer as commander of Grenadier-Regiment 545.)	12 December 1944	—	—
Egon Mayer+	Luftwaffe	Leutnant of the Reserves (Note: According to Scherzer as Leutnant and pilot in the III./Jagdgeschwader 2 "Richthofen".)	Pilot in Jagdgeschwader 2 "Richthofen"	1 August 1941	Awarded 232nd Oak Leaves 16 April 1943; 51st Swords 2 March 1944	
Hans-Karl Mayer	Luftwaffe	Hauptmann	Staffelkapitän of the 1./Jagdgeschwader 53	3 September 1940	—	—
Hermann Mayer	Heer	Leutnant of the Reserves	Zugführer (platoon leader) in the 2./Grenadier-Regiment 258	14 April 1943	—	—
Isidor Mayer	Heer	Obergefreiter	Rifle leader in the 14./Gebirgsjäger-Regiment 91	19 November 1943	—	—
Dr. rer. pol. Dr.-Ing. Johannes Mayer+	Heer	Oberst	Commander of Infanterie-Regiment 501	13 September 1941	Awarded 453rd Oak Leaves 13 April 1944; 89th Swords 23 August 1944	—
Wilhelm Mayer	Luftwaffe	Leutnant	Staffelführer of the 5./Jagdgeschwader 26 "Schlageter"	12 March 1945*	Killed in action 4 January 1945	—
Willy Mayer	Heer	Hauptmann	Leader of the I./Grenadier-Regiment 196	18 November 1944	—	—
Helmuth Mayer zur Linde (Note: According to Scherzer his name is Helmuth Mayer who received the Knight's Cross of the Iron Cross as commander of III./Grenadier-Regiment 102.)	Heer	Hauptmann	Leader of the III./Grenadier-Regiment 102	8 February 1944	—	—
Maximilian Mayerl	Luftwaffe	Oberleutnant	Staffelkapitän of the 9./Jagdgeschwader 51 "Mölders"	22 November 1943	—	—
Rudolf Mayr	Luftwaffe	Oberleutnant	Staffelkapitän of the 9./Kampfgeschwader 40	18 May 1943	—	—
Karl-Conrad Mecke	Kriegsmarine	Kapitän zur See	Commander of 22. Marine-Flak-Regiment	11 April 1943	—	—
Walter Mecke	Heer	Major	Commander of the I./Panzer-Regiment 27	23 November 1941	—	—
Helmut Meckel	Luftwaffe	Oberleutnant	Staffelkapitän in the I./Jagdgeschwader 3 (Note: According to Scherzer as Staffelkapitän of the 2./Jagdgeschwader 3.)	12 August 1941	—	
Max Mecklenburg	Heer	Major	Leader of a Kampfgruppe in Jäger-Regiment 28	18 November 1944	—	—
Karl-Friedrich von der Meden	Heer	Oberstleutnant	Commander of Radfahr-Abteilung 12	8 August 1941	—	—
Albert Meder	Heer	Major of the Reserves	Commander of Panzer-Jäger-Abteilung 33	5 November 1944	—	—
Johannes Meder	Heer	Major (Note: According to Scherzer as Hauptmann.)	Commander of the III./Infanterie-Regiment 19	4 September 1940	—	—
Franz Medicus	Heer	Major	Leader of a Kampfstaffel of the commander-in-chief of the Heeresgruppe Afrika	16 April 1943	—	—
Wilhelm Meendsen-Bohlken	Kriegsmarine	Konteradmiral	Befehlshaber der deutsches Marinekommandos in Italien (Commander-in-chief of the German Naval Commando in Italy)	15 May 1944	—	—
Wilhelm Meentzen	Kriegsmarine	Kapitänleutnant	Commander of Torpedoboot T-24	30 October 1944	—	—
Herbert Megow	Heer	Hauptmann	In the Pak-Artillerie-Abteilung 1037 (Note: According to Scherzer as commander of Artillerie-Pak-Abteilung (bodenständig—rooted in the soil) 1037.)	9 December 1944	—	—
Waldemar Mehl	Kriegsmarine	Kapitänleutnant	Commander of U-371	28 March 1944	—	—
Theodor Mehring	Heer	Oberstleutnant im Generalstab (in the General Staff)	Chief of the general staff of the 3. Gebirgs-Division (Note: According to Scherzer as chief of the general staff of the XXIX. Armeekorps.)	15 July 1944	—	—
[Dr.] Hans Mehrle	Heer	Oberleutnant	Regiment adjutant in Grenadier-Regiment 380 (Note: According to Scherzer as adjutant in Grenadier-Regiment 380.)	15 April 1944	—	—
Gerhard Meier	Heer	Leutnant (Note: According to Scherzer as Leutnant of the Reserves and leader in the Panzer-Jäger-Abteilung 26.)	Leader of Panzer-Jäger-Abteilung 26	5 April 1945	—	—
Hans Meier+	Heer	Hauptmann	Leader of I./Panzergrenadier-Regiment 74	30 September 1944	Awarded (874th) Oak Leaves 9 May 1945? (Note: Hans Meier's nomination for the Oak Leaves was received by the Heerespersonalamt (HPA—Army Staff Office) from the troop on 12 April 1945 and approved by all intermittent commanding officers. No further comments or indications of approval have been noted and left unfinished by the end of the war. A non contemporary file card notes an entry date 17 March 1945 which could be the nomination date of the troop. The nomination list for the higher grades of Knight's Cross of the Iron Cross indicates an entry date 12 April 1945, no further date is listed. A comment states: "Unfinished". According to the Association of Knight's Cross Recipients (AKCR) the award was presented in accordance with the Dönitz-decree. This is illegal according to the Deutsche Dienststelle (WASt) and lacks legal justification. The sequential number "874" was assigned by the AKCR, the presentation date by Fellgiebel.)	—
Hans-Otto Meier	Luftwaffe	Oberfeldwebel	Pilot in the 9./Schlachtgeschwader 77 (Note: According to Scherzer as pilot in the Stab III./Schlachtgeschwader 77.)	9 June 1944*	Killed in action 2 May 1944	—
Helmut Meier	Heer	Oberleutnant	Chief of the 14.(Panzerjäger)/Infanterie-Regiment 79 (Note: According to Scherzer as chief of the 14./Infanterie-Regiment 79.)	7 March 1941*	Killed in action 17 June 1940	—
Johann-Hermann Meier	Luftwaffe	Leutnant	Staffelführer in the 1./Jagdgeschwader 26 "Schlageter" (Note: According to Scherzer as Staffelführer in the I./Jagdgeschwader 52.)	16 December 1944*	Killed in flying accident 15 March 1944	—
Hubert-Erwin Meierdress+	Waffen-SS	SS-Obersturmführer	Leader of SS-Sturmgeschütz-Batterie "Totenkopf" (Note: According to Scherzer as leader of Sturmgeschütz-Batterie SS-Division-"Totenkopf".)	13 March 1942	Awarded 310th Oak Leaves 5 October 1943	—
Gustav Meierkord	Heer	Oberleutnant of the Reserves	Chief of the 3./Panzergrenadier-Regiment 64	9 December 1943	—	—
Julius Meimberg	Luftwaffe	Hauptmann	Gruppenkommandeur of the II./Jagdgeschwader 53	24 October 1944	—	—
Eugen Meindl+	Luftwaffe	Generalmajor	Commander of Fallschirmjäger-Sturm-Regiment (Note: According to Scherzer as commander of Luftlande-Sturm-Regiment 1.)	14 June 1941	Awarded 564th Oak Leaves 31 August 1944 (155th) Swords 8 May 1945? (Note: Eugen Meindl's nomination by the troop was approved by each of his commanding officers. However the nomination contains no final remark on the proceedings. Oberst Nicolaus von Below, Hitler's Luftwaffe adjutant, had sent a teleprinter message to the commanding general of the Fallschirmarmee Generaloberst Kurt Student, requesting a statement for this nomination. The copy of the teleprinter message contains a note: resubmission "23 April 1945". It seems that the statement was never returned. The paperwork was not finalized by the end of the war. The Association of Knight's Cross Recipients (AKCR) claims that the award was presented in accordance with the Dönitz-decree. This is illegal according to the Deutsche Dienststelle (WASt) and lacks legal justification. The sequential number "155" was assigned by the AKCR. Fellgiebel assigned the presentation date. Meindl is mentioned on a list of the Oberbefehlshaber Nordwest for "Nominations and Bestowal of War Awards" from May 1945. This list, which was intended to be presented to Karl Dönitz, contained twelve names of pending nominations which had been submitted via the chain of command. Dönitz has never signed this list, most likely he has never even seen this list. The responsible personnel offices awarded or declined eight nominations from this list by the end of the war by, two remained unprocessed by the Heerespersonalamt (HPA—Army Staff Office) and Luftwaffenpersonalamt (LPA—Luftwaffe Staff Office) and two further were left ready for signing at the Oberkommando der Wehrmacht/Wehrmacht-Führungsstab (OKW/WFSt—Oberkommando der Wehrmacht/Wehrmacht-Führungsstab—leadership staff of the Army High Command).)	A man wearing a military uniform with an Iron Cross displayed at the front of his uniform collar.
Hans-Georg Meinecke	Heer	Oberleutnant of the Reserves	Chief of the 1./Grenadier-Regiment 667	14 May 1944	—	—
Bruno Meineke	Heer	Major	Commander of the I./Infanterie-Regiment 407	19 June 1942	—	—
Ernst Meiners	Heer	Oberst of the Reserves	Commander of Grenadier-Regiment 161	17 December 1943	—	—
Dr. Otto Meiners	Heer	Major (Note: According to Scherzer as Major of the Reserves.)	Commander of the III./Infanterie-Regiment 477	22 February 1942	—	—
Rudolf Meinhardt	Heer	Obergefreiter	Deputy group leader in the Pionierzug/Grenadier-Regiment 528	15 May 1944	—	—
Dr. Wolfgang Meinhold	Heer	Oberleutnant of the Reserves	Chief of the 8./Grenadier-Regiment 123	15 May 1943	—	—
Johannes Meinicke	Luftwaffe	Leutnant	Staffelführer of the 1./Schlachtgeschwader 1	7 April 1943	—	—
Alfred Meinigke	Heer	Major	Commander of the I./Grenadier-Regiment 188	31 March 1943	—	—
Hans-Gustav Meisel	Luftwaffe	Fahnenjunker-Oberfeldwebel	Observer and commander in the 5.(H)/Aufklärungs-Gruppe 41 (Note: According to Scherzer as observer and commander in the Nahaufklärungsstaffel 5.(H)/41.)	20 July 1944	—	—
Martin Meisel	Luftwaffe	Oberleutnant	Pilot and technical officer in the 2.(F)/Aufklärungs-Gruppe 123 (Note: According to Scherzer as pilot and technical officer in the Aufklärungsstaffel 2.(F)/123.)	21 December 1942	—	—
Wilhelm Meisel	Kriegsmarine	Kapitän zur See	Commander of heavy cruiser Admiral Hipper	26 February 1941	—	
Herbert Meißner	Heer	Oberwachtmeister	Zugführer (platoon leader) in the 3./Sturmgeschütz-Abteilung 244	8 August 1943	—	—
Joachim Meißner	Luftwaffe	Leutnant of the Reserves	Deputy leader of Sturmgruppe "Eisen" (Assault Group "Iron") in Fallschirmjäger-Sturm-Abteilung "Koch" (Note: According to Scherzer as leader of Sturmgruppe "Eisen" (Assault Group "Iron") in Luftlande-Sturm-Abteilung "Koch".)	12 May 1940	—	—
Robert Meissner	Heer	Generalleutnant	Commander of the 68. Infanterie-Division	24 May 1943	—	—
Siegfried Meißner	Heer	Hauptmann	Commander of the III./Infanterie-Regiment 408	25 September 1942	—	—
Ludwig Meister	Luftwaffe	Hauptmann	Staffelkapitän of the 1./Nachtjagdgeschwader 4	9 June 1944	—	—
Rudolf Meister	Luftwaffe	Generalleutnant	Commanding general of the IV. Fliegerkorps	5 September 1944	—	A man wearing a peaked cap and military uniform with an Iron Cross displayed at the front of his uniform collar.
Heinrich Meiswinkel	Heer	Feldwebel	Zugführer (platoon leader) in the 1./Grenadier-Regiment 392	5 March 1945	—	—
Helmut Meitzel	Heer	Hauptmann	Commander of the II./Grenadier-Regiment 15 (motorized)	27 July 1944	—	—
Ulrich Melchior	Heer	Stabsfeldwebel	Zugführer (platoon leader) in the 6./Panzer-Regiment 18	5 February 1942*	Died of wounds 1 February 1942	—
Horst von Mellenthin+	Heer	Generalleutnant	Commander of the 205. Infanterie-Division	10 October 1944	Awarded 815th Oak Leaves 4 April 1945	—
Karl Mellwig	Heer	Oberst	Commander of Grenadier-Regiment 313	12 August 1944	—	—
Walter Meltzer	Luftwaffe	Oberleutnant	Staffelkapitän in the III./Kampfgeschwader z.b.V. 1	23 December 1942	—	—
Reinhard Melzer	Luftwaffe	Unteroffizier	Gun leader in the 1./Flak-Regiment 33 (motorized)	30 June 1941	—	—
Walter Melzer+	Heer	Oberst	Commander of Infanterie-Regiment 151	21 August 1941	Awarded 558th Oak Leaves 23 August 1944	—
Friedrich Memmert	Heer	Unteroffizier	Zugführer (platoon leader) in the 2./Pionier-Bataillon 20 (motorized)	9 June 1944	—	—
Josef Menapace	Luftwaffe	Leutnant	Staffelführer of the 7./Schlachtgeschwader 1	20 August 1942	—	—
Dr. jur. Erich Mende	Heer	Major	Leader of Grenadier-Regiment 216	28 February 1945	—	Black-and-white portrait of a man in semi profile wearing a suit and tie.
Rolf Mendte	Heer	Fahnenjunker-Feldwebel	Zugführer (platoon leader) in the 6./Grenadier-Regiment 31	24 December 1944	—	—
Heinz Meng	Heer	Leutnant of the Reserves	Company leader in Pionier-Bataillon 292	5 March 1945	—	—
Ernst Mengersen	Kriegsmarine	Kapitänleutnant	Commander of U-101	18 November 1941	—	—
Otto Menges	Luftwaffe	Oberfeldwebel	Zugführer (platoon leader) in the 6./Fallschirmjäger-Regiment 1	9 June 1944	—	A man wearing a peaked cap and military uniform.
August Menke	Heer	Obergefreiter	Machine gunner in the 7./Grenadier-Regiment 501	16 April 1944	—	—
Horstmar Menke	Heer	Hauptmann of the Reserves	Commander of the I./Grenadier-Regiment 1099	17 March 1945	—	—
Erwin Menny	Heer	Oberst	Commander of the 15. Schützen-Brigade	26 December 1941	—	
Franz von Mentz	Heer	Major	Leader of Panzergrenadier-Regiment 40	22 September 1943	—	—
Joachim Menzel	Heer	Major	Commander of Heeres-Flak-Artillerie-Abteilung (motorized) 277	10 September 1944	—	—
Eberhard Mergner	Heer	Major	Leader of Jäger-Regiment 207	1 February 1945	—	—
Ernst Merk	Heer	Oberst im Generalstab (in the General Staff)	Chief of the general staff of the III. Panzerkorps	15 July 1944	—	—
Herbert-Dietrich Merkel	Heer	Hauptmann of the Reserves	Leader of the I./Panzergrenadier-Regiment 304	8 August 1943	—	—
Hans-Hermann Merker	Luftwaffe	Oberleutnant	Staffelführer in the I./Kampfgeschwader 3 "Lützow"	9 June 1944	—	—
Ludwig Merker	Heer	Oberst	Commander of Infanterie-Regiment 215	18 November 1941	—	—
Hans-Joachim Merks? (Note: There is no reference of the Knight's Cross awarded to Hans-Joachim Merks in the German Federal Archives. His personal file contains a letter from 1955 by the Deutsche Dienststelle (WASt), indicating that no proof of the award exists. The date was assigned by the Association of Knight's Cross Recipients (AKCR).)	Kriegsmarine	Kapitänleutnant	Chief of the 2. Räumbootsflottille	28 May 1945	—	—
[Dr.] Ernst-Hermann Mersmann	Luftwaffe	Hauptmann	Staffelkapitän of the 1./Kampfgruppe z.b.V. 9	23 December 1942	—	—
Karl-Friedrich Merten+	Kriegsmarine	Korvettenkapitän	Commander of U-68	13 June 1942	Awarded 147th Oak Leaves 16 November 1942	—
Peter Merten	Heer	Oberfeldwebel of the Reserves	Zugführer (platoon leader) in the 5./Infanterie-Regiment 124	15 October 1942	—	—
Ewald Mertens	Heer	Hauptmann	Chief of the 15./Infanterie-Regiment 204	22 February 1942	—	—
Helmut Mertens	Luftwaffe	Oberleutnant	Pilot in the I./Jagdgeschwader 3 "Udet"	4 September 1942	—	—
Otto Mertens	Heer	Hauptmann of the Reserves	Leader of the III./Füsilier-Regiment 68	11 April 1944	—	—
[Dr.] Gerhard Mertins	Luftwaffe	Hauptmann	Leader of Fallschirm-Pionier-Bataillon 5	6 December 1944	—	—
Heinrich Meschede	Heer	Oberleutnant of the Reserves	Leader of the I./Grenadier-Regiment 308	25 January 1945	—	—
Gerhard Meschkat	Heer	Unteroffizier	According to Scherzer as Sturmgeschütz (assault gun) driver in the 1./Panzer-Jäger-Abteilung 72.|group="Note"}}	4 October 1944	—	—
Wilhelm Messer	Luftwaffe	Leutnant	Pilot in the 11./Transportgeschwader 2	12 March 1945	—	—
Erich Messinger	Heer	Oberstleutnant	Commander of Grenadier-Regiment 559	16 October 1944	—	—
Ernst Metelmann	Heer	Hauptmann	Commander of the I./Panzergrenadier-Regiment 11	22 August 1943	—	—
Gerhard Methner	Luftwaffe	Hauptmann	Commander of the II./Fallschirm-Artillerie-Regiment 6	30 April 1945	—	—
Fritz Mette	Heer	Obergefreiter	Group leader in the 9./Grenadier-Regiment 92 (motorized)	5 January 1943	—	—
Eduard Metz	Heer	Generalmajor	Commander of the 5. Panzer-Division	5 January 1943	—	—
Hans Metz	Heer	Hauptmann	Battery chief in Heeres-Artillerie-Abteilung 1042 (self-motorized)	5 March 1945	—	—
Walter Metze	Luftwaffe	Oberwachtmeister	Zugführer (platoon leader) in Flak-Regiment 36 (motorized) (Note: According to Scherzer as Zugführer (platoon leader) in the 10./Flak-Regiment 36.)	9 June 1944	—	—
Eugen Metzger	Heer	Leutnant of the Reserves	Zugführer (platoon leader) in the 1./Sturmgeschütz-Abteilung 203	29 September 1941	—	—
Richard Metzger	Heer	Major	Commander of Infanterie-Bataillon z.b.V. 561	12 October 1943	—	A man wearing a peaked cap and military uniform with an Iron Cross displayed at the front of his uniform collar.
Rudolf Metzig	Luftwaffe	Oberleutnant	Pilot and technical officer in the Stab I./Kampfgeschwader 4 "General Wever"	9 June 1944*	Killed in action 25 February 1944	—
Jost Metzler	Kriegsmarine	Kapitänleutnant	Commander of U-69	28 July 1941	—	—
Manfred Meurer+	Luftwaffe	Oberleutnant	Staffelkapitän of the 3./Nachtjagdgeschwader 1	16 April 1943	Awarded 264th Oak Leaves 2 August 1943	—
Fritz Meusgeier	Heer	Oberfeldwebel	Oberschirrmeister (a trained vehicle mechanic) in the 3./Panzer-Jäger-Abteilung 13	15 November 1941	—	—
Kurt Mevissen	Luftwaffe	Feldwebel	Pilot in the 9./Kampfgeschwader 1 "Hindenburg"	19 September 1942	—	—
Bruno Meyer	Luftwaffe	Oberleutnant	Staffelkapitän of the 5.(S)/Lehrgeschwader 2 (Note: According to Scherzer as Staffelkapitän of the 10.(S)/Lehrgeschwader 2.)	21 August 1941	—	—
Constantin Meyer	Heer	Oberstleutnant (Note: According to Scherzer as Oberstleutnant zur Verwendung (for disposition).)	Leader of Infanterie-Regiment 257	8 May 1942	—	—
Eduard Meyer	Luftwaffe	Leutnant	Pilot in the I./Zerstörergeschwader 26 "Horst Wessel"	20 December 1941	—	—
Elimar Meyer	Luftwaffe	Leutnant	Transport glider pilot in the 12./Luftlandegeschwader 1 (Note: According to Scherzer as pilot of a transport glider in the III./Luftlandegeschwader 1.)	17 September 1943	—	—
Friedrich-August Meyer? (Note: Friedrich-August Meyer's Luftwaffenpersonalamt-Verleihungsvorschlag (LPA-VV—Air Force Staff Office Nomination Recommendation) Nr. 1493 was forwarded to the adjutancy of Hermann Göring on 3 March 1945. The nomination was never finalized and was left unfinished by the end of the war. A radio message was sent by the chief of the LPA on 12 May 1945 stating that Meyer, effective as of today, has been awarded the Knight's Cross and therefore an unlawful presentation. The presentation date 9 May 1945 was assigned by Walther-Peer Fellgiebel.)	Luftwaffe	Oberst	Commander of Fallschirm-Panzer-Ersatz and Ausbildungs-Brigade "Hermann Göring"	9 May 1945	—	—
Fritz Meyer	Heer	Generalmajor	Commander of Oberbaustab 7	6 April 1943	—	—
Günter Meyer	Heer	Leutnant of the Reserves	Zugführer (platoon leader) in the 3./Panzer-Aufklärungs-Abteilung 12	5 March 1945	—	—
Hans Meyer	Waffen-SS	SS-Hauptsturmführer	Leader of the I./SS-Freiwilligen-Panzergrenadier-Regiment 49 "De Ruyter" (Note: According to Scherzer as leader of the I./SS-Freiwilligen-Panzergrenadier-Regiment 49 "De Ruyter" (niederl. Nr. 2).)	2 September 1944	—	—
Hans Meyer zur Heyde (Note: According to Scherzer name is Hans Meyer.)	Luftwaffe	Oberleutnant	Chief of the 3./Flak-Regiment 34	7 April 1945	—	—
Hans-Adolf Meyer	Luftwaffe	Oberleutnant	Staffelkapitän of the 8./Schlachtgeschwader 3 (Note: According to Scherzer as Staffelführer of the 8./Schlachtgeschwader 3.)	6 April 1944	—	—
Heinrich Meyer	Luftwaffe	Oberleutnant	Observer in the I./Kampfgeschwader 2	15 October 1942	—	—
Heinz Meyer+	Luftwaffe	Hauptmann of the Reserves (Note: According to Scherzer as Hauptmann (War Officer).)	Chief of the 8./Fallschirmjäger-Regiment 4	8 April 1944	Awarded 654th Oak Leaves 18 November 1944	A man wearing a military uniform with an Iron Cross displayed at the front of his uniform collar.
Heinz Meyer	Heer	Hauptmann	Company chief in the II./Panzer-Regiment 22	4 October 1944	—	—
Heinz Meyer	Luftwaffe	Oberfähnrich	Pilot in the 8./Schlachtgeschwader 2 "Immelmann"	17 April 1945	—	—
[Dr.] Jochen Meyer	Heer	Rittmeister	Commander of the II./Panzergrenadier-Regiment 155 (Note: According to Scherzer as commander of the II./Panzergrenadier-Regiment Afrika.)	31 March 1943	—	—
Josef Meyer	Heer	Hauptmann (Note: According to Scherzer as Hauptmann of the Reserves.)	Leader of the I./Grenadier-Regiment 423	5 April 1945*	Killed in action 10 February 1945	—
Kuno von Meyer+	Heer	Major	Commander of the I./Panzer-Regiment 24	26 November 1944	Awarded 795th Oak Leaves 23 March 1945	—
Kurt Meyer+	Waffen-SS	SS-Sturmbannführer	Commander of SS-Aufklärungs-Abteilung "Leibstandarte SS Adolf Hitler" (Note: According to Scherzer as commander of Aufklärungs-Abteilung "Leibstandarte SS Adolf Hitler".)	18 May 1941	Awarded 195th Oak Leaves 23 February 1943; 91st Swords 27 August 1944	A smiling man wearing a military uniform, peaked cap and neck order, in the shape of a cross.
Otto Meyer	Luftwaffe	Oberfeldwebel	Pilot in the III./Kampfgeschwader 55 (Note: According to Scherzer as pilot in the Eis-Staffel of the III./Kampfgeschwader 55.)	29 February 1944	—	A man wearing a military uniform with various military decorations including an Iron Cross displayed at the front of his uniform collar.
Otto Meyer+	Waffen-SS	SS-Obersturmbannführer	Commander of SS-Panzer-Regiment 9 "Hohenstaufen" (Note: According to Scherzer as commander of SS-Panzer-Regiment 9.)	4 June 1944	Awarded 601st Oak Leaves 30 September 1944	A black-and-white photograph of a man wearing a military uniform, cap and a neck order in shape of an Iron Cross. His cap has an emblem in shape of a human skull and crossed bones.
Walter Meyer	Heer	Oberfeldwebel	Shock troops leader in the 7./Infanterie-Regiment 125	14 May 1941	—	—
Walter Meyer	Heer	Feldwebel	Zugführer (platoon leader) in the 5./Grenadier-Regiment 1221	11 March 1945 (Note: According to Scherzer on 28 April 1945.)	—	—
Walter Meyer	Heer	Hauptmann (Note: According to Scherzer as Hauptmann of the Reserves.)	Kampfkommandant (combat commander) of Lüben	23 March 1945	—	—
Werner Meyer	Waffen-SS	SS-Obersturmführer	Leader of the 1./SS-Panzergrenadier-Regiment 9 "Germania" (Note: According to Scherzer as leader of the 1./SS-Panzergrenadier-Regiment 9.)	4 May 1944	—	—
Heinrich Meyer-Buerdorf	Heer	Generalleutnant	Commander of the 131. Infanterie-Division	15 November 1941	—	—
Hermann Meyer-Rabingen	Heer	Generalleutnant	Commander of the 197. Infanterie-Division	12 January 1942	—	—
Heinrich Meyering	Luftwaffe	Feldwebel	Pilot in the 3./Schlachtgeschwader 2 "Immelmann" (Note: According to Scherzer as pilot in the I./Schlachtgeschwader 2 "Immelmann".)	6 April 1944	—	—
Wilhelm Meyn	Luftwaffe	Leutnant	Staffelführer of the 9./Schlachtgeschwader 3	24 October 1944	—	—
Emil Mez	Heer	Hauptmann	Commander of the I./Grenadier-Regiment 290	6 March 1944	—	—
Ernst Michael	Heer	Oberst	Commander of Infanterie-Regiment 2	18 May 1942	—	—
Friedrich-August von Michael	Heer	Hauptmann	Commander of the II./Grenadier-Regiment 172	10 February 1945	—	—
Georg Michael+	Heer	Leutnant of the Reserves	Zugführer (platoon leader) in the 6./Reiter-Regiment 22	19 January 1941	Awarded 187th Oak Leaves 25 January 1943	—
Hermann Michael	Luftwaffe	Hauptmann	Staffelkapitän of the 8./Kampfgeschwader 1 "Hindenburg"	9 October 1943*	Killed in action 5 July 1943	—
Hans Michaelis	Heer	Major	Leader of Grenadier-Regiment 184	28 September 1943	—	—
Herbert Michaelis	Heer	Oberst	Commander of Grenadier-Regiment 525 and leader of the 298. Infanterie-Division (Note: According to Scherzer as commander of Grenadier-Regiment 525.)	27 December 1942	—	—
Hans Michahelles	Kriegsmarine	Konteradmiral	Fortress commander of the northern Gironde estuary (Note: According to Scherzer as fortress commander of the northern Gironde estuary, at the same time sea commander Gascony.)	30 April 1945	—	—
Georg Michalek	Luftwaffe	Oberleutnant	Staffelkapitän of the 4./Jagdgeschwader 3	4 November 1941	—	
Erich Michalski	Heer	Major	Commander of the II./Grenadier-Regiment 578	6 February 1944	—	—
Gerhard Michalski+	Luftwaffe	Oberleutnant	Staffelkapitän of the 4./Jagdgeschwader 53	4 September 1942	Awarded 667th Oak Leaves 25 November 1944	—
Fritz Michel	Heer	Hauptmann	Leader of the I./Panzergrenadier-Regiment 200	18 December 1944	—	—
Heinz Michelsen	Heer	Hauptmann	Leader of the I./Panzergrenadier-Regiment 11	18 February 1945	—	—
Johann Mickl+	Heer	Oberst	Commander of Schützen-Regiment 155	13 December 1941	Awarded 205th Oak Leaves 6 March 1943	—
Hubert Mickley+	Heer	Hauptmann	Leader of the I./Grenadier-Regiment 4	26 December 1943	Awarded 540th Oak Leaves 4 August 1944	—
Karl Mickley	Heer	Oberleutnant of the Reserves	Chief of the 7./Schützen-Regiment 304	13 June 1941	—	—
Albert Mielke	Heer	Feldwebel	Zugführer (platoon leader) in the 6./Grenadier-Regiment 189	23 March 1945	—	—
Friedrich Mieth+	Heer	General der Infanterie	Commanding general of the IV. Armeekorps	2 November 1943	Awarded 409th Oak Leaves 1 March 1944	—
Rudolf Miethig	Luftwaffe	Leutnant	Staffelführer of the 3./Jagdgeschwader 52	29 October 1942	—	—
Klaus Mietusch+	Luftwaffe	Hauptmann	Gruppenkommandeur of the III./Jagdgeschwader 26 "Schlageter"	26 March 1944	Awarded 653rd Oak Leaves 18 November 1944	Mietusch stands inside his open aircraft cockpit wearing full flight gear.
Hans Mikosch+	Heer	Oberstleutnant	Commander of Pionier-Bataillon 51	21 May 1940	Awarded 201st Oak Leaves 6 March 1943	—
Bernhard Mikus	Heer	Leutnant of the Reserves	Leader of the 1./Panzergrenadier-Regiment 114	26 August 1943	—	—
Gerhard Milbradt	Heer	Leutnant of the Reserves	Leader of the 6./Grenadier-Regiment 532	1 October 1943	—	—
Erhard Milch	Luftwaffe	Generaloberst	Staatssekretär der Luftfahrt im Reichsluftfahrtministerium (State Secretary of aviation in the Ministry of Aviation) (Note: According to Scherzer as chief of Luftflotte 5 and Befehlshaber Nord (commander-in-chief north).)	4 May 1940	—	A man wearing a peaked cap and military uniform with various military decorations including an Iron Cross displayed at the front of his uniform collar.
Dr. jur. Werner Milch	Luftwaffe	Hauptmann of the Reserves	Commander of Fallschirm-Granatwerfer-Lehr and Versuchs-Bataillon	9 January 1945	—	—
Werner Mildebrath	Heer	Oberstleutnant	Commander of the I./Panzer-Regiment 5	12 August 1942	—	—
Otto Milek	Heer	Rittmeister (Note: According to Scherzer as Oberleutnant.)	Leader of Divisions-Füsilier-Bataillon (A.A.) 11	10 September 1944	—	—
Karl-Hermann Millahn	Luftwaffe	Hauptmann	Staffelkapitän of the Stabsstaffel/Kampfgeschwader 76	29 February 1944	—	—
Hans Miller	Heer	Leutnant of the Reserves	Zugführer (platoon leader) in the 14./Grenadier-Regiment 546	18 December 1944	—	—
Franz Millonig	Heer	Oberleutnant	Leader of the 1./Panzer-Pionier-Bataillon 57	18 October 1941	—	—
Berndt Lubich von Milovan (Note: According to Scherzer name is Berndtlubich von Milovan, listing him under the letter "L", who aacording to Scherzer received the Knight's Cross as eader of the 1./SS-Sturmgeschütz-Abteilung 3.)	Waffen-SS	SS-Obersturmführer	Leader of the 1./SS-Sturmgeschütz-Abteilung 3 "Totenkopf"	14 October 1943	—	—
Aegidius Mimra	Heer	Hauptmann	Commander of the I./Panzer-Regiment 31	18 February 1945	—	—
Wilhelm Mink	Luftwaffe	Oberfeldwebel	Pilot in the 5./Jagdgeschwader 51 "Mölders"	19 March 1942	—	—
Franz Mintert	Heer	Obergefreiter	Richtschütze (gunner) in Panzer-Jäger-Abteilung 26	14 September 1942	—	—
Harry Mirau	Heer	Gefreiter	Richtschütze (gunner) in the 3./Panzer-Jäger-Abteilung 3	13 November 1942	—	—
Götz Freiherr von Mirbach+	Kriegsmarine	Oberleutnant zur See	Commander of Schnellboot S-21 in the 1. Schnellbootflottille (Note: According to Scherzer as commander of Schnellboot S-21.)	14 August 1940	Awarded 500th Oak Leaves 14 June 1944	—
Gerd Mischke	Luftwaffe	Leutnant	Zugführer (platoon leader) in the 2./Fallschirm-MG-Bataillon 1 (Note: According to Scherzer as Zugführer (platoon leader) in the 2./Fallschirm-MG-Bataillon.)	18 May 1943	—	—
Walter Misera+	Heer	Major	Commander of the II./Grenadier-Regiment 515	23 August 1943 (Note: According to Scherzer on 28 March 1943.)	Awarded 569th Oak Leaves 2 September 1944	—
Helmut Mißner	Luftwaffe	Oberfeldwebel	Pilot in the I./Jagdgeschwader 54 (Note: According to Scherzer as pilot in the 3./Jagdgeschwader 54.)	10 October 1944*	Killed in action 12 September 1944	—
Martin Mitschke	Heer	Feldwebel	Zugführer (platoon leader) in the 2./Grenadier-Regiment 200 (motorized)	16 October 1944	—	—
Lambert Mitterwenger	Heer	Unteroffizier	In the 2.(Sturmgeschütz)/Panzer-Jäger-Abteilung 1548 (Note: According to Scherzer in the 2./Panzer-Jäger-Abteilung 1548.)	18 December 1944	—	—
Berndt von Mitzlaff	Heer	Major	Commander of Panzer-Aufklärungs-Abteilung 8	20 December 1943	—	—
Walter Mix+	Heer	Oberleutnant of the Reserves	Chief of the 9./Grenadier-Regiment 174	18 December 1942	Awarded 405th Oak Leaves 22 February 1944	—
Stefan Mlinar	Heer	Gefreiter	Wireless/radio troop leader in the 5./Gebirgsjäger-Regiment 13	24 June 1944	—	—
Friedrich Moch	Heer	Hauptmann	Leader of the I./Grenadier-Regiment 258	27 March 1942	—	—
Aloys Mocken	Heer	Hauptmann of the Reserves	Commander of the I./Grenadier-Regiment 216	28 July 1943	—	—
Walter Model+	Heer	Generalleutnant	Commander of the 3. Panzer-Division	9 July 1941	Awarded 74th Oak Leaves 17 February 1942; 28th Swords 2 April 1943; 17th Diamonds 17 August 1944	An older man wearing a peaked cap and military coat.
Willy Moder	Heer	Unteroffizier	Group leader in the 6./Schützen-Regiment 3	28 November 1940	—	—
Johannes Modick	Heer	Oberleutnant of the Reserves	Chief of the 3./Grenadier-Regiment 670	5 February 1945	—	—
Ernst-Wilhelm Modrow	Luftwaffe	Hauptmann	Staffelkapitän of the 1./Nachtjagdgeschwader 1	19 August 1944	—	—
Martin Möbus+	Luftwaffe	Leutnant	Pilot in the 1./Sturzkampfgeschwader 1 (Note: According to Scherzer as pilot in the I./Sturzkampfgeschwader 1, Oak Leaves on 25 April 1944.)	8 May 1940	Awarded 463rd Oak Leaves 27 April 1944	
Alexander Möckel	Heer	Oberstleutnant	Commander of Infanterie-Regiment 517	6 February 1942	—	—
Hans-Hermann Möckel	Heer	Hauptmann	Leader of Kampfgruppe of Grenadier-Regiment 226	17 April 1945	—	—
Artur Möhle	Luftwaffe	Oberleutnant of the Reserves (Note: According to Scherzer as Oberleutnant (war officer).)	Pilot and observer in the 2.(H)/Aufklärungs-Gruppe 12	23 June 1942	—	—
Karl-Heinz Moehle	Kriegsmarine	Kapitänleutnant	Commander of U-123	26 February 1941	—	—
Helmut Möhlmann	Kriegsmarine	Kapitänleutnant	Commander of U-571	16 April 1943	—	—
Heinz Möhring	Heer	Hauptmann	Leader of the II./Grenadier-Regiment 255	6 March 1944	—	—
Kurt Möhring	Heer	Oberst	Commander of Grenadier-Regiment 82	18 July 1943	—	—
Werner Mölders+	Luftwaffe	Hauptmann	Gruppenkommandeur of the III./Jagdgeschwader 53	29 May 1940	Awarded 2nd Oak Leaves 21 September 1940; 2nd Swords 22 June 1941; 1st Diamonds 15 July 1941 (Note: According to Scherzer 1st Diamonds on 16 July 1941.)	The head and shoulders of a young man, shown in semi-profile. He wears a field cap and a pilot's leather jacket with a fur collar, with an Iron Cross displayed at the front of his shirt collar. His hair is dark and short, his nose is long and straight, and his facial expression is a determined and confident smile; his eyes gaze into the distance.
Leonhard von Moellendorf	Heer	Rittmeister of the Reserves	Commander of the III./Führer Begleit Brigade (Note: According to Scherzer as Commander of the III./Führer Begleit Brigade [= Grenadier-Battalion 928].)	8 January 1945*	Killed in action 1 January 1945	—
Emil Möller	Heer	Hauptmann of the Reserves	Leader of the I./Grenadier-Regiment 266	26 October 1943	—	—
Ernst Möller	Heer	Major	Commander of Füsilier-Bataillon 553 (553. Volksgrenadier-Division) (Note: According to Scherzer as commander of Füsilier-Bataillon 553.)	30 April 1945	—	—
Günther Möller	Heer	Oberleutnant	Chief of the 2./Sturmgeschütz-Abteilung 191	22 September 1941	—	—
Hans Möller	Heer	Oberleutnant	Aide-de-camp (O1) in the Stab 15. Infanterie-Division (Note: According to Scherzer as Aide-de-camp (O1) in the 15. Infanterie-Division.)	15 August 1940	—	—
Hans Moeller	Heer	Oberleutnant	Chief of Jagd-Panzer-Kompanie 1181	14 April 1945	—	—
Hans Möller	Heer	Unteroffizier	Zugführer (platoon leader) in the 11./Infanterie-Regiment 58	6 September 1942	—	—
Lorenz Möller	Luftwaffe	Oberleutnant	Staffelkapitän in the II./Kampfgeschwader z.b.V. 1	4 February 1942	—	—
Werner Möller	Heer	Hauptmann	Deputy leader of the I./Panzergrenadier-Regiment 12 (Note: According to Scherzer as leader of the I./Panzergrenadier-Regiment 12.)	28 November 1943	—	—
Kurt Mörgel	Heer	Hauptmann	Commander of the II./Grenadier-Regiment 200 (motorized)	17 September 1944	—	—
Walter Möse+	Heer	Oberjäger	Zugführer (platoon leader) in the 13./Jäger-Regiment 49	11 March 1943	Awarded 390th Oak Leaves 10 February 1944	
Erhard Mösslacher	Waffen-SS	SS-Obersturmführer	Chief of the 6./SS-Kavallerie-Regiment 16 "Florian Geyer" (Note: According to Scherzer as chief of the 6./SS-Kavallerie-Regiment 16.)	9 February 1945	—	—
Gerhard Möws	Heer	Oberleutnant	Chief of the 3./Kradschützen-Bataillon 22	1 November 1942	—	—
Wilhelm Mohnke	Waffen-SS	SS-Obersturmbannführer	Commander of SS-Panzergrenadier-Regiment 26 "Hitlerjugend" (Note: According to Scherzer as commander of SS-Panzergrenadier-Regiment 26.)	11 July 1944	—	—
Carl-Friedrich Mohr	Kriegsmarine	Kapitänleutnant	Chief of the 24. Minensuchflottille "Karl-Friedrich Brill"	11 March 1945	—	—
Johann Mohr+	Kriegsmarine	Kapitänleutnant	Commander of U-124	27 March 1942	Awarded 177th Oak Leaves 13 January 1943	—
Rolf Mohr	Heer	Unteroffizier	Group leader in the 1./Panzergrenadier-Regiment 26	5 March 1945	—	—
Walter Mohr	Heer	Oberfeldwebel	Zugführer (platoon leader) in the II./Grenadier-Regiment 313 (Note: According to Scherzer as leader of the bicycle platoon/Grenadier-Regiment 313.)	28 September 1943	—	—
Walter-Peter Mohr	Heer	Major	Leader of Grenadier-Regiment Mohr in the fortress Breslau	9 April 1945	—	—
Hans Mohrmann	Heer	Hauptmann of the Reserves	Commander of the I./Grenadier-Regiment 892	24 June 1944	—	—
Gerhard Mokros+	Heer	Leutnant (Note: According to Scherzer as Leutnant of the Reserves.)	Leader of the 7./Infanterie-Regiment 331	18 November 1941	Awarded (860th) Oak Leaves 5 May 1945	—
Siegfried Moldenhauer	Heer	Hauptmann	Leader of the II./Grenadier-Regiment 48	20 January 1944	—	—
Karl-Theodor Molinari	Heer	Major	Commander of the I./Panzer-Regiment 36	3 November 1944	—	—
Helmut von Moltke	Heer	Rittmeister	Transferred to the 19. Panzer-Division for general staff training and leader of Panzer-Aufklärungs-Abteilung 19 (Note: According to Scherzer as leader of Panzer-Aufklärungs-Abteilung 19.)	22 September 1943	—	—
Heinrich Mondabon	Heer	Oberleutnant	Company chief in the II./Schützen-Regiment 114	4 December 1941	—	—
Rudolf Mons	Luftwaffe	Oberleutnant	Pilot in the I./Kampfgeschwader 40	18 September 1941	—	A man wearing a peaked cap and military uniform with an Iron Cross displayed at the front of his uniform collar.
Richard Monschau	Heer	Major	Commander of the III./Panzergrenadier-Regiment 2 (Note: According to Scherzer as II./Panzergrenadier-Regiment 2.)	23 December 1944	—	—
Alfred Montag+	Heer	Hauptmann of the Reserves	Chief of the 2./Sturmgeschütz-Brigade 909	21 April 1944	Awarded (873rd) Oak Leaves 9 May 1945? (Note: The nomination was received by the Heerespersonalamt (HPA—Army Staff Office) from the troop on 28 April 1945 and approved by the Corps and by the OB West. Missing is a statement by the Army and by the Army Group (Heeresruppe). Major Joachim Domaschk decided "Oak Leaves yes" but deferred, Heeresgruppe B—the Sturmgeschütz-Brigade had already surrendered together with the Heeresgruppe B in the Ruhr Pocket. The nomination was therefore left unfinished according to AHA 44 Ziff. 572. The nomination list of the higher grade of the Knight's Cross of the Iron Cross with Oak Leaves confirms the entry of 28 March 1945. Noted here is a comment indicating "deferred". A formal presentation has not happened. The sequential number "868" was assigned by the Association of Knight's Cross Recipients (AKCR). The presentation date was assigned by Fellgiebel. Alfred Montag was a member of the AKCR.)	—
Zeslaus Montreal	Heer	Oberfeldwebel	Zugführer (platoon leader) in the 1./Grenadier-Regiment 445	6 November 1943	—	—
Gerhard Moormann	Heer	Obergefreiter	Group leader in the 6./Panzergrenadier-Regiment 4	14 May 1944*	Died of wounds 13 March 1944	—
Gerardus Mooyman	Waffen-SS	SS-Sturmmann	Gun leader in the 14./SS-Freiwilligen-Legion "Nederland" (Note: According to Scherzer as gun leader in the 14./SS-Freiwilligen-Legion "Niederlande".)	20 February 1943	—	Gerardus Mooyman
Johannes Morawietz	Heer	Oberleutnant	Leader of the 1./Jäger-Regiment 28	7 January 1943	—	—
Willi Morawietz (Note: According to Scherzer name is spelled Wilhelm Morawietz.)	Heer	Oberfeldwebel	Zugführer (platoon leader) in the 13./Grenadier-Regiment 3	5 November 1944	—	—
Erich Morgenstern	Luftwaffe	Oberfeldwebel	Radio operator in the I./Schlachtgeschwader 5	4 May 1944	—	—
Gerhard Morich	Luftwaffe	Hauptmann	Staffelkapitän in the 4./Kampfgeschwader 4 "General Wever"	20 July 1944	—	—
Georg-Friedrich Moritz	Heer	Rittmeister	Chief of the 2./Radfahr-Abteilung 32	28 April 1943	—	—
Wilhelm Moritz	Luftwaffe	Major	Gruppenkommandeur of the IV./Jagdgeschwader 3 "Udet" (Note: According to Scherzer as Gruppenkommandeur of the IV.(Sturm)/Jagdgeschwader 3 "Udet".)	18 July 1944	—	—
Hermann Morr	Heer	Leutnant	Leader of the 1./Heeres-Pionier-Bataillon 746	31 December 1944	—	—
August Mors	Luftwaffe	Leutnant	Pilot in the 1./Jagdgeschwader 5	20 October 1944* (Note: According to Scherzer on 24 October 1944.)	Died of wounds 8 August 1944	—
Max Morsche? (Note: According to Scherzer his name is Max Morche. Morche had been nominated for the Knight's Cross of the Iron Cross on 31 January 1945 via teleprinter message by the XX Army Corps. This teleprinter message is no longer available. The Heerespersonalamt Abteilung P 5/Registratur (Army Personnel Office Department P 5/Registry) received a teleprinter message on 8 February 1945 from the commander-in-chief of the Army Group North, which made reference to the former message. This second message contained the approvals of Morche's intermittent commanders, General der Infanterie Friedrich-Wilhelm Müller (4th Army) and Generaloberst Lothar Rendulic (Army Group North). Nevertheless the nomionation must have been rejected because Morche was not listed in the nomination book. Also missing are the nominations by the troop and the Heerespersonalamt-Verleihungsvorschlag (HPA-VV—Army Staff Office Nomination Recommendation), nor is there a file card. The Order Commission of the Association of Knight's Cross Recipients (AKCR) never processed Morche's case. According to the AKCR the award was presented in accordance with the Dönitz-decree. This is illegal according to the Deutsche Dienststelle (WASt) and lacks legal justification.)	Heer	Gefreiter	In the 14./Grenadier-Regiment 101	9 May 1945	—	—
Georg Morys	Heer	Oberfeldwebel	Zugführer (platoon leader) in the 1./Panzer-Jäger-Abteilung 181	2 September 1944	—	—
Friedrich-Wilhelm Morzik	Luftwaffe	Oberst	Geschwaderkommodore of Kampfgeschwader z.b.V. 1 and Lufttransportführer Ost (Air Transportation Leader East) of Luftflotte 1 (Note: According to Scherzer as Lufttransportführer (Air Transportation Leader) with the quarter master general of the Luftwaffe.)	16 April 1942	—	
Anton Mosandl	Heer	Leutnant of the Reserves	Zugführer (platoon leader) in the 6./Gebirgsjäger-Regiment 99	28 November 1940	—	—
Hans von der Mosel+	Heer	Oberst	Commander of Infanterie-Regiment 548	9 August 1942	Awarded 589th Oak Leaves 18 September 1944	
Oskar Moser	Heer	Stabsfeldwebel	Zugführer (platoon leader) in the 2./Panzer-Abteilung 106 "Feldherrnhalle" (Note: According to Scherzer as Zugführer (platoon leader) in the 2./Panzer-Abteilung 2106.)	4 October 1944	—	—
Wilhelm Moser	Heer	Obergefreiter	Group leader in the 3./Grenadier-Regiment 24	5 September 1944	—	—
Willi Moser	Heer	Generalleutnant	Commander of the 299. Infanterie-Division	26 October 1941	—	—
Johann Moshammer	Heer	Major	Commander of the II./Infanterie-Regiment 50	31 December 1941	—	—
Franz Mosler	Heer	Gefreiter	Richtschütze (gunner) in the 9./Infanterie-Regiment 461	9 May 1942	—	—
[Dr.] Martin Moßdorf	Luftwaffe	Oberleutnant	Staffelkapitän of the 3./Sturzkampfgeschwader 3	3 September 1942	—	—
Hans-Theo Moßgraber	Luftwaffe	Oberleutnant	Staffelkapitän of the 5./Kampfgeschwader 3 "Lützow"	29 October 1943*	Killed in action 27 November 1942	—
Jakob Most	Heer	Feldwebel	Zugführer (platoon leader) in the 2./Panzer-Aufklärungs-Abteilung 9	23 October 1944	—	—
Heinz Mothes	Heer	Hauptmann	Leader of the I./Grenadier-Regiment 3	18 October 1943	—	—
Bruno Moysies	Heer	Oberfeldwebel	Zugführer (platoon leader) in the 3./Füsilier-Regiment 22	6 March 1944	—	—
Werner Mozer	Heer	Leutnant of the Reserves	Zugführer (platoon leader) in the 5./Feldersatz-Bataillon 215	11 December 1944	—	—
Rudolf Mrkva	Luftwaffe	Oberleutnant	Pilot in the 2./Schlachtgeschwader 2 "Immelmann" (Note: According to Scherzer as pilot in the I./Schlachtgeschwader 2 "Immelmann".)	20 July 1944	—	—
Ewald Mrousek (Note: According to Scherzer name is spelled Ewald Mrusek.)	Heer	Stabsfeldwebel	Zugführer (platoon leader) in the 2./Feld-Bataillon Tunis 1	19 January 1943	—	—
Johannes Mücke	Heer	Oberleutnant	Chief of the 3./Infanterie-Regiment 51 (motorized)	10 February 1942	—	—
Georg Mügge	Heer	Oberleutnant	Leader of the II./Infanterie-Regiment 203	27 December 1941	—	—
Rudolf Mühlbauer	Kriegsmarine	Oberbootsmannsmaat	Brückenmaat (look out on the bridge) on U-123	10 December 1944	—	—
Karl Mühleck	Waffen-SS	SS-Untersturmführer	Zugführer (platoon leader) in the 2./SS-Panzergrenadier-Regiment 2 "Das Reich" (Note: According to Scherzer as Zugführer (platoon leader) in the 2./SS-Panzergrenadier-Regiment 2.)	4 June 1944	—	—
Hans-Heinrich von zur Mühlen	Luftwaffe	Oberleutnant of the Reserves	Staffelkapitän of the 2./Transportgeschwader 3	28 February 1945	—	—
Kurt-Hermann Freiherr von Mühlen+	Heer	Oberstleutnant	Leader of Jäger-Regiment 75	6 November 1942	Awarded 690th Oak Leaves 9 January 1945	—
Johannes Mühlenkamp+	Waffen-SS	SS-Sturmbannführer	Commander of SS-Panzer-Abteilung 5 "Wiking" (Note: According to Scherzer as commander of the Panzer-Abteilung of the SS-Division "Wiking".)	3 September 1942	Awarded 596th Oak Leaves 21 September 1944	—
Günter Mühlke	Heer	Gefreiter	Messenger in the II./Grenadier-Regiment 959	14 April 1945	—	—
Peter-Eberhard Müllensiefen	Luftwaffe	Hauptmann	Staffelkapitän of the 1.(H)/Aufklärungs-Gruppe 31	31 October 1944	—	—
Albert Müller	Waffen-SS	SS-Hauptscharführer	Pak (anti tank) Zugführer (platoon leader) in the 4./SS-Panzergrenadier-Regiment 10 "Westland"	4 August 1943	—	—
Albert Müller	Kriegsmarine	Kapitänleutnant	Commander of Schnellboot S-59 in the 3. Schnellbootflottille (Note: According to Scherzer commander of Schnellboot S-52.)	13 December 1943	—	—
Albert Müller	Heer	Stabsgefreiter	Group leader in the 1./Füsilier-Regiment 22	4 October 1944	—	—
Albrecht Müller (Note: According to Scherzer name is spelled Albert Müller.)	Heer	Oberleutnant of the Reserves	Chief of the 1./Grenadier-Regiment 446	23 February 1944	—	—
Alfred Müller+	Heer	Hauptmann	Chief of Sturmgeschütz-Lehr-Batterie 901	20 February 1943	Awarded 354th Oak Leaves 15 December 1943	—
Alfred Müller	Heer	Feldwebel	Zugführer (platoon leader) in the 2./Grenadier-Regiment 256	8 May 1943	—	—
Alfred Müller	Heer	Hauptmann	Leader of Sturm-Bataillon AOK 9 (Note: According to Scherzer as training course officer at the Army-Weapons-School of AOK 9 and leader of Sturm-Bataillon AOK 9.)	12 August 1944*	Killed in action 6 July 1944	—
Alois Müller	Heer	Unteroffizier	Group leader in the 4./Grenadier-Regiment 435	12 August 1944*	Killed in action 17 July 1944	—
Anton Müller+	Heer	Hauptmann	Leader of the I./Grenadier-Regiment 501	10 September 1944	Awarded 738th Oak Leaves 14 February 1945	—
Curt Müller	Heer	Oberfeldwebel	Zugführer (platoon leader) in the 9./Grenadier-Regiment 220	7 February 1944*	Killed in action 16 January 1944	—
Dietrich von Müller+	Heer	Oberstleutnant	Commander of Schützen-Regiment 5	3 May 1942	Awarded 272nd Oak Leaves 16 August 1943; 134th Swords 20 February 1945	—
Eduard Müller later Eduard Müller-Reinders	Heer	Oberwachtmeister	Zugführer (platoon leader) in the 2./Sturmgeschütz-Abteilung 244	25 January 1943	—	—
Erich Müller	Luftwaffe	Feldwebel	Pilot in the Stabsstaffel Schlachtgeschwader 2 "Immelmann" (Note: According to Scherzer as pilot in the II./Schlachtgeschwader 2 "Immelmann".)	6 December 1944*	Killed in action 22 July 1944	—
Erwin Müller	Heer	Oberfeldwebel	Troop leader in the 2./Pionier-Bataillon 122	29 February 1944*	Died of wounds 21 December 1943	—
Friedrich Müller	Heer	Oberfeldwebel	Zugführer (platoon leader) in the 8.(MG)/Grenadier-Regiment 461 (Note: According to Scherzer as Zugführer (platoon leader) in the 8./Grenadier-Regiment 461.)	27 August 1943	—	—
Friedrich-Karl Müller+	Luftwaffe	Oberleutnant	Staffelkapitän of the 8./Jagdgeschwader 53 (Note: According to Scherzer as Staffelkapitän of the 8./Jagdgeschwader 53 on 19 September 1941.)	14 September 1942	Awarded 126th Oak Leaves 23 September 1942	—
Friedrich-Karl Müller	Luftwaffe	Hauptmann	Staffelkapitän of the 1./Nachtjagdgruppe 10	27 July 1944	—	—
Friedrich-Wilhelm Müller+	Heer	Oberstleutnant	Commander of Infanterie-Regiment 105	22 September 1941	Awarded 86th Oak Leaves 8 April 1942; 128th Swords 27 January 1945	—
Fritz Müller+	Heer	Hauptmann	Commander of the II./Jäger-Regiment 38	25 August 1942	Awarded 477th Oak Leaves 14 May 1944	—
Georg Müller	Heer	Oberleutnant of the Reserves	Chief of the 2./Infanterie-Regiment 321	9 August 1942	—	—
Gerhard Müller	Heer	Oberst	Commander of Panzer-Regiment 5	9 September 1942	—	—
Gerhard Müller	Heer	Major of the Reserves	Commander of Pionier-Bataillon 208	10 March 1943	—	—
Gottlob Müller	Luftwaffe	Generalmajor	Commanding general and commander-in-chief of Luftgau Tunis (Note: According to Scherzer as commander of Luftgaustab z.b.V. Tunis.)	8 June 1943	—	—
Günter Müller	Heer	Hauptmann	Commander of the II./Grenadier-Regiment 551	19 August 1944	—	—
Günther Müller	Luftwaffe	Leutnant	Staffelführer of the 7./Schlachtgeschwader 1 (Note: According to Scherzer as Staffelkapitän of the 7./Schlachtgeschwader 1.)	9 October 1943	—	—
Hans Müller	Heer	Hauptmann	Commander of the II./Infanterie-Regiment 111	18 January 1942	—	—
Hans Müller	Luftwaffe	Oberleutnant	Pilot in Fernaufkläungs-Gruppe 5 (Note: According to Scherzer as pilot in Stab/Fernaufkläungs-Gruppe 5.)	18 November 1944	—	—
Hans Müller	Heer	Hauptmann	Commander of the I./Grenadier-Regiment 111	14 April 1945	—	—
Heinz Müller	Waffen-SS	SS-Hauptsturmführer of the Reserves	Leader of the III./SS-Panzergrenadier-Regiment 6 "Theodor Eicke"	23 March 1945*	Killed in action 17 March 1945	—
Helmut Müller	Heer	Oberleutnant	Battery chief in the schwere Artillerie-Abteilung 624 (motorized)	23 October 1944	—	—
Dr. Herbert Müller	Heer	Major	Commander of the II./Schützen-Regiment 394	8 September 1941	—	—
Horst Müller	Luftwaffe	Oberleutnant	Pilot in the II./Kampfgeschwader 76	3 May 1942	—	—
Johann Müller	Heer	Oberfeldwebel	Zugführer (platoon leader) in the 5./Grenadier-Regiment 332	6 April 1944	—	—
Johann Müller	Heer	Feldwebel	Panzer commander in the 3./Panzer-Abteilung 502	23 October 1944	—	—
Karl Müller	Luftwaffe	Oberfeldwebel	Pilot in the 12./Kampfgeschwader 2	15 October 1942	—	—
Karl Müller	Kriegsmarine	Kapitänleutnant	Commander of Schnellboot S-52 in the 5. Schnellbootflottille (Note: According to Scherzer commander of Schnellboot S-52.)	8 July 1943	—	—
Klaus Müller (Note: According to Scherzer first name is Claus.)	Heer	Major	Commander of Panzer-Abteilung 60	3 April 1942	—	—
Klaus Müller	Heer	Oberleutnant	Chief of the 6./Panzer-Regiment 2	7 October 1942*	Killed in action 4 September 1942	—
Kurt Müller	Heer	Oberleutnant	Leader of the 6./Panzer-Regiment 4	14 February 1945	—	—
Ludwig Müller+	Heer	Generalleutnant	Commander of the 97. Jäger-Division	25 October 1943	Awarded 440th Oak Leaves 6 April 1944	—
Martin Müller	Heer	Oberfeldwebel	Zugführer (platoon leader) in the 13.(IG)/Infanterie-Regiment 90 (Note: According to Scherzer as Zugführer (platoon leader) in the 13./Infanterie-Regiment 90.)	25 October 1942	—	—
Peter Müller	Heer	Oberleutnant of the Reserves	Chief of the 2./Grenadier-Regiment 666	3 April 1943	—	—
Philipp Müller	Luftwaffe	Hauptmann	Staffelkapitän of the 1./Kampfgeschwader 55	2 April 1943 (Note: According to Scherzer on 3 April 1943.)	—	—
Richard Müller	Heer	Generalleutnant	Commander of the 211. Infanterie-Division	7 March 1943	—	
Rudolf Müller	Luftwaffe	Feldwebel	Pilot in the 6./Jagdgeschwader 5	19 June 1942	—	
Rudolf Müller	Luftwaffe	Hauptmann	Gruppenkommandeur of the I./Kampfgeschwader 27 "Boelcke"	1 July 1942	—	—
Rudolf Müller	Heer	Oberleutnant	Leader of the 6./Artillerie-Regiment 24	30 April 1945	—	—
Siegfried Müller	Waffen-SS	SS-Sturmbannführer	Commander of SS-Panzergrenadier-Regiment 25 "Hitlerjugend" (Note: According to Scherzer as commander of SS-Panzergrenadier-Regiment 25.)	19 December 1944	—	—
Vincenz Müller	Heer	Generalleutnant	Deputy leader of the XXVII. Armeekorps (Note: According to Scherzer as leader of the XXVII. Armeekorps.)	7 April 1944	—	A man with glasses talking into microphones behind a lecturn.
Waldemar Müller	Heer	Hauptmann	Commander of the II./Grenadier-Regiment 211	6 March 1944	—	—
Walter Müller	Heer	Major of the Reserves	Commander of the II./Grenadier-Regiment 272	21 October 1942	—	—
Walter Müller	Heer	Hauptmann	Commander of Panzer-Jäger-Abteilung 389	27 July 1944	—	—
Walter Müller! (Note: The addendum of Walther-Peer Fellgiebel's book, Die Träger des Ritterkreuzes des Eisernen Kreuzes 1939–1945 (in German), contains a note indicating that Walter Müller needs to be struck from the list.)	Luftwaffe	Hauptmann	Staffelkapitän of the 3./Nachtjagdgeschwader 1	20 August 1944	—	—
Werner Müller	Heer	Oberleutnant	Leader of the 7./Panzergrenadier-Regiment 67	26 December 1944	—	—
Wilhelm Müller	Luftwaffe	Hauptmann	Deputy commander of the I./Flak-Regiment 231 (motorized) (Note: According to Scherzer as leader of the I./Flak-Regiment 231 (motorized).)	9 January 1945	—	—
Willi Müller	Heer	Unteroffizier	Group leader in the 2./Grenadier-Regiment 1060	25 January 1945	—	—
Willy Müller	Heer	Major	Commander Panzer-Pionier-Bataillon 144	14 April 1945	—	—
Philipp Müller-Gebhard	Heer	Generalleutnant	Commander of the 72. Infanterie-Division	3 September 1942	—	—
Herbert Müller-George	Heer	Hauptmann	Leader of the I./Jäger-Regiment 741	18 February 1945	—	—
Erich Müller-Melahn	Heer	Oberst	Commander of Grenadier-Regiment 151	5 April 1944	—	—
Friedrich Müller-Rochholz? (Note: No evidence of the award can be found in the German Federal Archives. The files of the order commission of the Association of Knight's Cross Recipients (AKCR) indicated that Friedrich Müller-Rochholz's former divisional commander Generalmajor Hermann Schulte-Heuthaus in 1961 recalled that he had nominated five members of his division, presumably among them Müller-Rochholz, for the Knight's Cross of the Iron Cross in the timeframe mid to end-March 1945. Additionally a further intermittent commander, the former commanding general of the Panzer-Korps "Großdeutschland" General der Panzertruppe Georg Jauer, stated in 1961 that he had as a matter of principle always approved awards for distinguished officers. The nomination however has either never made it to the Heerespersonalamt (HPA—Army Staff Office), a fact already noted by Von Seemen, or had been rejected by the HPA. The HPA never created an internal approval request. Müller-Rochholz is also not listed in the book "Verliehene Ritterkreuze" (Awarded Knight Crosses). An autonomous presentation can also be ruled out because Müller-Rochholz had been nominated via the command chain. The presentation date was assigned by Walther-Peer Fellgiebel. Müller-Rochholz was a member of the AKCR.)	Heer	Hauptmann	Commander of Panzer-Sturm-Pionier-Bataillon "Brandenburg"	8 May 1945	—	—
Günther Müller-Stöckheim	Kriegsmarine	Kapitänleutnant	Commander of U-67	27 November 1942	—	—
Joachim Müncheberg+	Luftwaffe	Oberleutnant	Staffelkapitän of the 7./Jagdgeschwader 26 "Schlageter" (Note: According to Scherzer as adjutant in the III./Jagdgeschwader 26 "Schlageter".)	14 September 1940	Awarded 12th Oak Leaves 7 May 1941; 19th Swords 9 September 1942	
Thaddäus Münst	Heer	Unteroffizier	Troop leader in the 1./Panzer-Aufklärungs-Abteilung 125	14 April 1945	—	—
Leopold Münster+	Luftwaffe	Feldwebel	Pilot in the II./Jagdgeschwader 3 "Udet"	21 December 1942	Awarded 471st Oak Leaves 12 May 1944	
Eberhard Muenzner	Heer	Hauptmann	Regiment adjutant in Panzergrenadier-Regiment 111 (Note: According to Scherzer as adjutant in Panzergrenadier-Regiment 111.)	23 August 1943	—	—
Alfred Mues	Heer	Oberleutnant	Chief of the 8./Schützen-Regiment 64	31 December 1941	—	—
Hubert Mütherich	Luftwaffe	Oberleutnant	Staffelkapitän of the 5./Jagdgeschwader 54	6 August 1941	—	—
Rolf Mützelburg+	Kriegsmarine	Kapitänleutnant	Commander of U-203	17 November 1941	Awarded 104th Oak Leaves 15 July 1942	
Alfons Muggenthaler	Luftwaffe	Oberleutnant of the Reserves (Note: According to Scherzer as Oberleutnant (war officer) and observer in the Aufklärungsstaffel 1.(F)/121.)	Observer in the 1.(F)/Aufklärungs-Gruppe 121	29 February 1944	—	—
Hermann Mugler	Heer	Oberleutnant	Chief of the 5./Gebirgs-Pionier-Bataillon 54	5 July 1941	—	—
Johann Muhr	Luftwaffe	Leutnant	Leader of the anti-aircraft armoured train in the 5./Flak-Abteilung 505 (Note: According to Scherzer as leader of the 5./gemischte Flak-Abteilung 505 (deployable) and leader of an anti-aircraft armoured train (makeshift) of the 9. Flak-Division.)	22 November 1943	—	—
[Dr.] Josef-Georg Mulzer+	Heer	Major	Commander of Pionier-Bataillon 195	7 September 1943	Awarded 367th Oak Leaves 10 January 1944	—
Werner Mummert+	Heer	Major of the Reserves	Commander of Aufklärungs-Abteilung 256	17 August 1942	Awarded 429th Oak Leaves 20 March 1944; 107th Swords 23 October 1944	A man wearing a military uniform with an Iron Cross displayed at the front of his uniform collar.
Dieter Mund	Heer	Leutnant of the Reserves	Leader of the 1./Panzer-Jäger-Abteilung 61	19 September 1943	—	—
Franz Mund	Luftwaffe	Oberfeldwebel	Observer in the 6./Kampfgeschwader 53 "Legion Condor"	17 March 1945	—	—
Ulrich Mundt	Luftwaffe	Oberfeldwebel	Pilot in the 10.(Panzer)/Schlachtgeschwader 1	25 November 1944	—	—
Rudolf Munser	Heer	Hauptmann of the Reserves	Commander of the II./Grenadier-Regiment 338	9 April 1943	—	—
Johann Munz	Heer	Hauptmann	Commander of Pionier-Bataillon 387	18 November 1943	—	—
Oskar Munzel	Heer	Oberst	Leader of the 14. Panzer-Division	16 October 1944	—	A smiling Munzel wearing a black military uniform stands inside his tank turret.
Heinrich Murken	Heer	Major	Leader of Grenadier-Regiment 124	21 February 1944*	Killed in action 30 January 1944	—
Heinz Murr	Waffen-SS	SS-Hauptsturmführer	Leader of the III./SS-Panzergrenadier-Regiment 9 "Germania"	21 September 1944	—	—
Friedrich-Heinrich Musculus	Heer	Major of the Reserves	Leader of Panzer-Jäger-Abteilung 111 (Note: According to Scherzer as leader of Panzer-Jäger-Abteilung 111 and of a Kampfgruppe.)	17 February 1943	—	—
Alfred Muser	Kriegsmarine	Kapitänleutnant	Chief of the 8. Räumbootflottille	12 August 1944	—	—
Fritz Muster	Heer	Feldwebel	Troop leader in Panzer-Aufklärungs-Abteilung 116	14 April 1945	—	—
Karl Muth	Heer	Oberfeldwebel	Zugführer (platoon leader) in the 7./Grenadier-Regiment 399	5 September 1944	—	—
Franz Muttenthaler	Heer	Feldwebel	Zugführer (platoon leader) in the 1./Panzergrenadier-Regiment 10	11 December 1944	—	—
Wilhelm Mylius	Luftwaffe	Hauptmann	Staffelkapitän of the 6./Kampfgeschwader 55	3 April 1943	—	—
