= Lembit =

Male given name

- Gender: Male
- Name day: 21 September

Origin
- Region of origin: Estonia

Lembit is an Estonian masculine given name. A variant is Lembitu. Lembit may refer to:

- Lembitu (died 1217), Estonian elder and military leader from Sakala County
- Lembit Annus (1941–2018), Soviet-Estonian politician
- Lembit Arro (1930–2022), Estonian politician
- Lembit Eelmäe (1927–2009), Estonian actor
- Lembit Jaanits (1925–2015), Estonian archaeologist
- Lembit Kaljuvee (born 1952), Estonian politician
- Lembit Kolk (1907–2003), Estonian politician
- Lembit Küüts (born 1946), Estonian artist and politician
- Lembit Lõhmus (born 1947), Estonian printmaker
- Lembit Maurer (1929–2006), Estonian boxer and boxing coach
- Lembit Oll (1966–1999), Estonian chess grandmaster
- Lembit Öpik (born 1965), UK politician of Estonian descent
- Lembit Peterson (born 1953), Estonian actor and theatre director
- Lembit Rajala (born 1970), Estonian footballer
- Anton Lembit Soans (1885–1966), Estonian architect, urban planner and lecturer
- Lembit Sibul (1947–2001), Estonian humorist and stage actor
- Lembit Uibo (born 1971), Estonian diplomat
- Lembit Ulfsak (1947–2017), Estonian actor
- Lembit Vahesaar (1936–2013), Estonian chess and draughts referee
