= August Johannes Salum =

Estonian politician

August Johannes Salum (19 May 1894 Mäksa Parish, Tartu County – June 1969) was an Estonian veterinarian and politician. He was a member of IV and V Riigikogu. He was a member of the Riigikogu beginning on 2 September 1930, when he replaced Hans Miller.

August Salum was born in present-day Kastre Parish. He served in the Estonian Defence Forces during the Estonian War of Independence. From 1924-1926, he studied at the Faculty of Medicine of the University of Tartu. He then studied at the Faculty of Veterinary Medicine of the University of Tartu from 1927-1930 and from 1936-1939.

He worked as a veterinarian on the island of Saaremaa from 1939 to 1941, in Palamuse from 1941 to 1944, in Jõgeva from 1944 to 1953, and in Põltsamaa from 1953 to 1965.

== Personal life ==
After retiring in 1965, Salum settled in Põltsamaa. He is buried in Põltsamaa cemetery. Salum's cousin was the double bass player Ludvig Juht. His son Vello Salum, was an Estonian Evangelical Lutheran Church clergyman, dissident, and politician. His son-in-law was chess and draughts referee and sports official Lembit Vahesaar.
