= Lembit Sibul =

Estonian humorist and stage actor

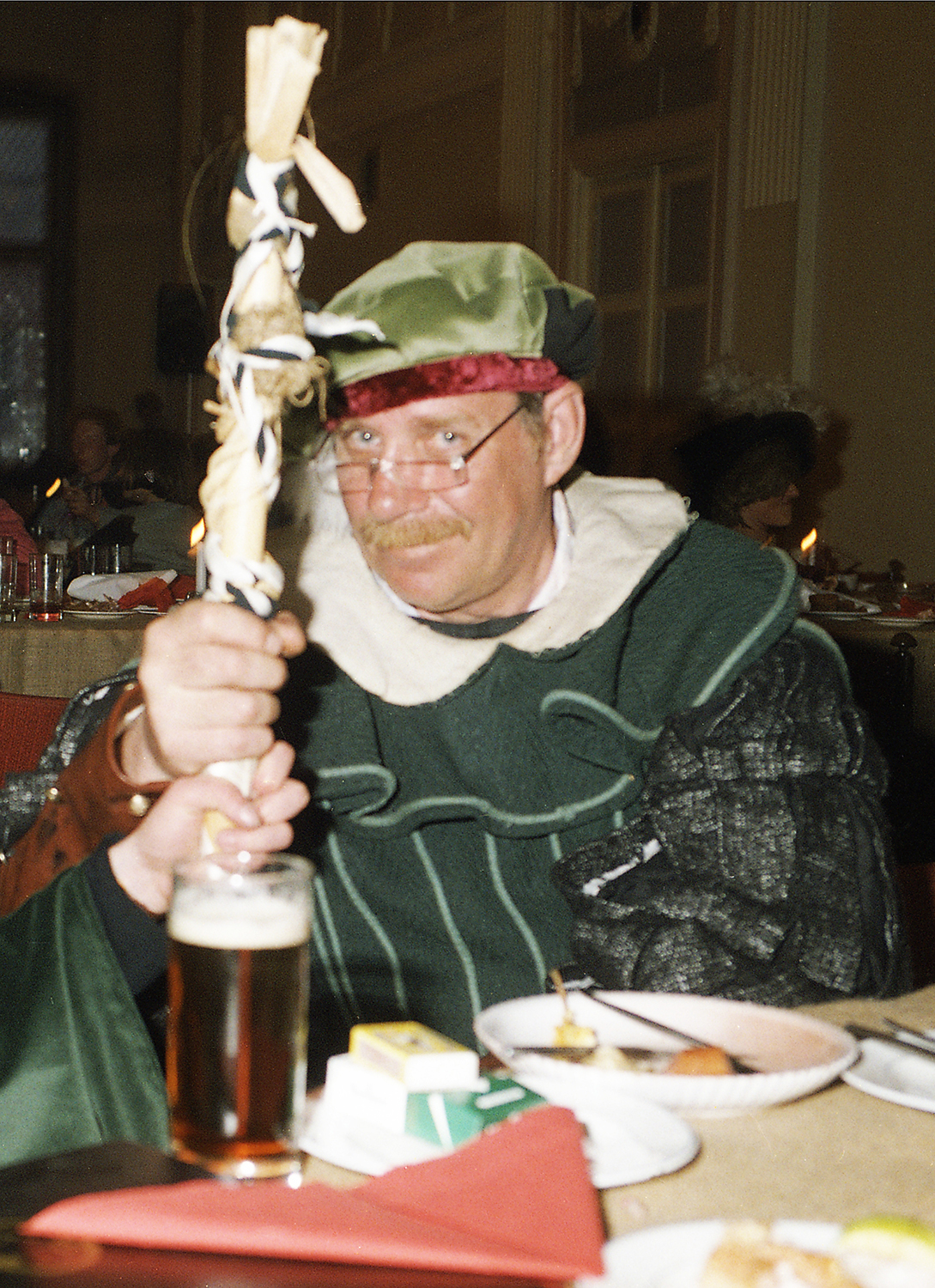
Lembit Sibul (1997)

Lembit Sibul (January 14, 1947 — October 2, 2001) was an Estonian humorist and stage actor, known for his work with the Estonian satire and humor magazine, Pikker.

In 1997 Lembit Sibul was awarded the Estonian humor award Meie Mats.
