= Lembit (disambiguation) =

Lembit is an Estonian masculine given name.

Lembit may also refer to:

- EML Lembit (1918)(et), the first combat ship of the Estonian Navy, formerly the gunboat Bobr of the Russian Imperial Navy
- EML Lembit, Estonian Navy submarine, commissioned in 1937 and now a museum ship
- Lembit Monument, or Monument of the Estonian War of Independence, Suure-Jaani, Estonia
