= Vello Salum =

Estonian clergyman and politician

Vello Salum (5 July 1933 – 30 November 2015) was an Estonian Lutheran clergyman, Soviet dissident, and politician.

Salum was born in Elistvere in Tartu County. His father August Johannes Salum was a veterinarian and politician. He was a member of Constitutional Assembly of Estonia.

In 2000, he was awarded with Order of the National Coat of Arms, III class. Salum died on 30 November 2015 in Viljandi and was buried on 10 December 2015 in Pilistvere Cemetery.
