= Eve Uusmees =

Estonian swimmer (1936–2026)

Personal information
- Born: 27 December 1936 Tallinn, Estonia
- Died: 10 February 2026 (aged 89)
- Height: 1.67 m (5 ft 6 in)
- Weight: 64 kg (141 lb)
- Spouse: Lembit Maurer

Sport
- Sport: Swimming
- Club: Kalev Tallinn
Medal record
Women's swimming
Representing the Soviet Union
European Championships
Silver medal – second place	1958 Budapest	4×100 m medley

Eve-Mai Maurer (née Uusmees; 27 December 1936 – 10 February 2026) was an Estonian breaststroke swimmer who won the silver medal in the 4×100 m medley relay at the 1958 European Aquatics Championships. She also competed at the 1960 Summer Olympics in the 200 m breaststroke but was eliminated in the preliminaries.

Maurer started training in gymnastics but around 1952 switched to swimming. Her name is usually given as Eve Uusmees, but she changed it to Maurer in 1959. During 1953–64 she competed for the Estonian team and during 1956–62 for the Soviet Union team. She won five USSR titles: 100 m breaststroke (1960), 200 m breaststroke (1958–60) and 4×100 m medley (1958); in 1962 she finished second in the 100 m, and in 1956–57 she was third in the 200 m breaststroke. After retirement she worked as a swimming coach and administrator.

Maurer died on 10 February 2026, at the age of 89.
