= Pikker (magazine) =

Estonian magazine (1943–2001)

Pikker was an Estonian magazine of satire and humor published between 1943 and 2001, named for the Estonian lightning god Pikker.

During 1943–1944 Pikker existed as satire and humor supplement to the Soviet Estonian newspaper Rahva Hääl and printed in Moscow and Leningrad. In 1945 its editorial office was moved to Tallinn, Estonian SSR. In 1973 Pikker published two articles which criticised the planned economy which were censored by the authorities soon after the publication. In 1987, on April Fools' Day the magazine issued a humor award, Meie Mats.
