= Lembit Uibo =

Estonian diplomat

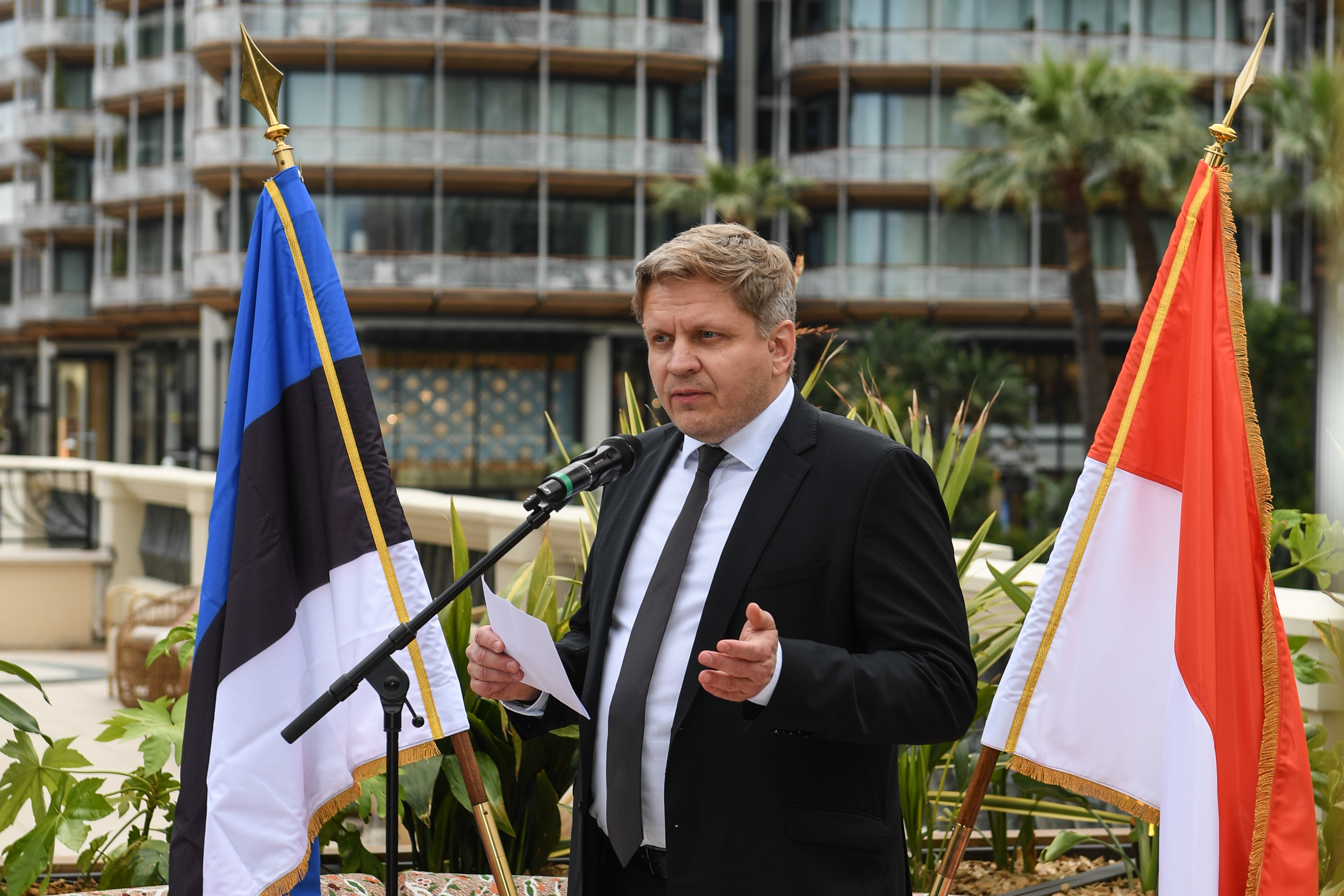
Lembit Uibo

Lembit Uibo (born 27 June 1971) is an Estonian diplomat.

In 2001 he defended his master's thesis in European and comparative law at Maastricht University. Since 1999 he has worked at Estonian Foreign Ministry.

Since 2010 he is Ambassador of Estonia to Czech Republic. Since 2021 he is Ambassador of Estonia to France.

Awards:

- 2004: Order of the White Star, IV class.
