= Helmut Mißner =

World War II Luftwaffe fighter ace (1921–1944)

- Born: 19 May 1921; Stuttgart-Zuffenhausen, Germany
- Died: 12 September 1944 (aged 23); Sagan, Poland
- Burial place: Poznań Milostowo, Poland
- Military career
- Allegiance: Nazi Germany
- Branch: Luftwaffe
- Service years: 1941–1944
- Rank: Oberfeldwebel
- Unit: JG 54
- Commands: I./JG 54
- Conflicts: World War II; Eastern Front
- Awards: German Cross; Knight's Cross of the Iron Cross

Helmut Mißner (Note: His name, in German, is spelled with a "sharp S"; see ß.) (19 May 1921 – 12 September 1944) was a former Luftwaffe fighter ace and recipient of the Knight's Cross of the Iron Cross. The Knight's Cross of the Iron Cross, and its variants were the highest awards in the military and paramilitary forces of Nazi Germany during World War II. He was credited with 82 aerial victories all over the Eastern Front. In 1944 he was killed in action over Sagan, Poland.

== Career ==
Mißner entered the Luftwaffe 6 January 1941. In 1942 he was transferred to I./JG 54. Based on his experience, he was one of the instructors for the Luftwaffe. He was assigned to the Eastern Front and he had 82 aerial victories. On 17 July 1943, Mißner was credited with claiming JG 54s 5,000th aerial victory.

=== Instructor and death ===
In mid-July 1944, Mißner was posted to 1. Staffel of Ergänzungs-Jagdgruppe Ost, renamed Ergänzungs-Jagdgruppe Nord on 1 September, a fighter pilot training unit. On 12 September 1944, Mißner was killed in flight accident at Sagan, also known as Żagań, Poland. It is thought that lack of oxygen caused him and his Focke-Wulf Fw 190 A-8 (Werknummer 170713—factory number) to plunge from an altitude of 6,500 meters (21,300 feet) and crash. He was buried at Poznan, Poland in a mass grave. Before his death, Mißner was recommended for promotion to Leutnant (second lieutenant). Posthumously, he was awarded the Knight's Cross of the Iron Cross (Ritterkreuz des Eisernen Kreuzes) on 10 October 1944 for his 82 aerial victories claimed.

== Summary of career ==
=== Aerial victory claims ===
According to US historian David T. Zabecki, Mißner was credited with 82 aerial victories. Mathews and Foreman, authors of Luftwaffe Aces — Biographies and Victory Claims, researched the German Federal Archives and found records for 83 aerial victories, all of which claimed on the Eastern Front.

Victory claims were logged to a map-reference (PQ = Planquadrat), for example "PQ 00351". The Luftwaffe grid map (Jägermeldenetz) covered all of Europe, western Russia and North Africa and was composed of rectangles measuring 15 minutes of latitude by 30 minutes of longitude, an area of about 360 square miles (930 km^{2}). These sectors were then subdivided into 36 smaller units to give a location area 3 km × 4 km (1.9 mi × 2.5 mi) in size.

Chronicle of aerial victories
This and the – (dash) indicates unwitnessed aerial victory claims for which Mißner did not receive credit. This and the ? (question mark) indicates information discrepancies listed by Prien, Stemmer, Rodeike, Balke, Bock, Mathews and Foreman.
Claim	Date	Time	Type	Location	Claim	Date	Time	Type	Location
– 2. Staffel of Jagdgeschwader 54 – Eastern Front — 1 May 1942 – 3 February 1943
1	15 September 1942	07:20	Pe-2	PQ 00351; 10 km (6.2 mi) northeast of Gatchina					
– 2. Staffel of Jagdgeschwader 54 – Eastern Front — 4 February – 31 December 1943
2	14 February 1943	15:00	I-16	PQ 36 Ost 00421; Pushkin-Mga	18	6 July 1943	08:15	U-2	PQ 35 Ost 63392; 15 km (9.3 mi) west-northwest of Maloarkhangelsk
3	14 February 1943	15:02	MiG-3	PQ 36 Ost 00412; 10 km (6.2 mi) east of Pushkin	19	7 July 1943	14:13	Yak-7	PQ 35 Ost 63582; 20 km (12 mi) southwest of Maloarkhangelsk
4	15 February 1943	07:30? (Note: According to Mathews and Foreman claimed at 07:31.)	Il-2	PQ 36 Ost 10563; 10 km (6.2 mi) east of Lyuban	20	7 July 1943	14:18	La-5	PQ 35 Ost 63564; 10 km (6.2 mi) southwest of Maloarkhangelsk
5	15 February 1943	07:40	Il-2	PQ 36 Ost 10532; 10 km (6.2 mi) northeast of Lyuban	21	8 July 1943	13:45	Il-2	PQ 35 Ost 63551; 15 km (9.3 mi) west-southwest of Maloarkhangelsk
6	15 February 1943	07:42	Il-2	PQ 36 Ost 10474; 25 km (16 mi) northeast of Lyuban	22	8 July 1943	13:47	P-39	PQ 35 Ost 63574
7	15 February 1943	15:30	La-5	PQ 36 Ost 00412; 10 km (6.2 mi) east of Pushkin	23	9 July 1943	12:01	Il-2	PQ 35 Ost 63813; 25 km (16 mi) south of Maloarkhangelsk
8	17 February 1943	10:15	Il-2	PQ 36 Ost 00414; 10 km (6.2 mi) east of Pushkin	24	12 July 1943	19:35	LaGG-3	PQ 35 Ost 63235; 40 km (25 mi) southeast of Mtsensk
9	23 February 1943	09:40	LaGG-3	PQ 36 Ost 10161 southeast of Shlisselburg	25	13 July 1943	10:42	Il-2	PQ 35 Ost 63256; 40 km (25 mi) east-southeast of Oryol
10	9 March 1943	10:15	LaGG-3	PQ 36 Ost 00433; 10 km (6.2 mi) southwest of Mga	26	13 July 1943	10:43	Il-2	PQ 35 Ost 63268, south-southwest of Novosil; 55 km (34 mi) east-southeast of Oryol
11	23 March 1943	11:09	Il-2	PQ 36 Ost 00423; Pushkin-Mga	27	13 July 1943	13:39	LaGG-3	PQ 35 Ost 63255; 40 km (25 mi) east-southeast of Oryol
12	24 March 1943	11:12	P-39	PQ 36 Ost 00442; 10 km (6.2 mi) southeast of Slutsk	28	14 July 1943	15:32	La-5	PQ 35 Ost 54418; 40 km (25 mi) west-southwest of Belyov
13	26 May 1943	20:07? (Note: According to Mathews and Foreman claimed at 20:17.)	LaGG-3	PQ 36 Ost 10313; 10 km (6.2 mi) south of Mga	29	14 July 1943	15:46	Il-2	PQ 35 Ost 54284; 25 km (16 mi) west of Belyov
14	5 June 1943	15:15	LaGG-3	PQ 36 Ost 00173; 10 km (6.2 mi) north of Selo	30	17 July 1943	07:02	LaGG-3	PQ 35 Ost 54464; 20 km (12 mi) north-northwest of Bolkhov
15	18 June 1943	17:05	LaGG-3	PQ 36 Ost 20163, Volkhovstroy south of Volkhov	31	17 July 1943	19:02	Yak-4	PQ 35 Ost 63836; 40 km (25 mi) southeast of Maloarkhangelsk
16	22 June 1943	02:32	P-40	PQ 36 Ost 00344; 10 km (6.2 mi) north of Gatchina	32	27 July 1943	12:37	Il-2	PQ 35 Ost 54571; 15 km (9.3 mi) east-northeast of Pskov
17	5 July 1943	03:55	LaGG-3	PQ 35 Ost 63574; 35 km (22 mi) southwest of Maloarkhangelsk	33	28 July 1943	15:10	Yak-7	PQ 35 Ost 54594; 30 km (19 mi) northeast of Karachev
– 2. Staffel of Jagdgeschwader 54 – Eastern Front — 1 January – July 1944
34	12 February 1944	14:09	Il-2	PQ 35 Ost 06794	59	24 April 1944	10:28	Yak-9	PQ 26 Ost 70363; Baltic Sea, east-northeast of Kunda
35	16 February 1944	14:26	LaGG-3	PQ 25 Ost 39411; 20 km (12 mi) south of Narva	60	8 May 1944	14:00	Il-2	PQ 26 Ost 70512; Baltic Sea, 50 km (31 mi) west of Hungerburg
36	18 February 1944	15:23	Il-2	PQ 26 Ost 70663; 10 km (6.2 mi) west-southwest of Hungerburg	61	8 May 1944	14:02	Il-2	PQ 26 Ost 70384; Baltic Sea, 50 km (31 mi) east-northeast of Kunda
37	25 February 1944	08:55	Il-2	PQ 26 Ost 70699	62	13 May 1944	08:00	Il-2	PQ 26 Ost 70372; Baltic Sea, 50 km (31 mi) east-northeast of Kunda
38	25 February 1944	09:05	Il-2	PQ 26 Ost 70692; 15 km (9.3 mi) southwest of Narva	63	13 May 1944	08:03	Il-2	PQ 26 Ost 70382; Baltic Sea, 35 km (22 mi) east-northeast of Kunda
39	6 March 1944	12:25	La-5	PQ 26 Ost 70854; 35 km (22 mi) southwest of Narva	64	16 May 1944	10:15	Il-2	PQ 26 Ost 70372; Baltic Sea, 30 km (19 mi) east-northeast of Kunda
40	6 March 1944	16:25	La-5	PQ 26 Ost 70823; 25 km (16 mi) southwest of Narva	65	16 May 1944	10:18	Il-2	PQ 26 Ost 70382; Baltic Sea, 35 km (22 mi) east-northeast of Kunda
41	6 March 1944	16:26	La-5	PQ 26 Ost 70821; 25 km (16 mi) southwest of Narva	66	26 May 1944	13:36	La-5	PQ 26 Ost 80172; Gulf of Finland, north of Hungerburg
42	7 March 1944	14:57	Yak-9	PQ 26 Ost 70364; Baltic Sea, 50 km (31 mi) east-northeast of Kunda	67	26 May 1944	19:02	La-5	PQ 26 Ost 80173; Gulf of Finland, north of Hungerburg
43	9 March 1944	14:58	La-5	PQ 26 Ost 80573 southwest of Narva	68	29 May 1944	05:39	Il-2	PQ 26 Ost 70393; Gulf of Finland
44	9 March 1944	15:20? (Note: According to Mathews and Foreman claimed at 15:26.)	LaGG-3	PQ 26 Ost 70421; Baltic Sea, 30 km (19 mi) northwest of Hungerburg	69	29 May 1944	05:45	Il-2	PQ 26 Ost 70493; Baltic Sea, 10 km (6.2 mi) northwest of Hungerburg
45	10 March 1944	08:00	LaGG-3	PQ 26 Ost 70332	70	2 June 1944	10:21? (Note: According to Mathews and Foreman claimed at 10:25.)	P-40	PQ 26 Ost 8084; 25 km (16 mi) south of Narva
46	26 March 1944	06:26	Il-2	PQ 26 Ost 70381; Baltic Sea, 35 km (22 mi) east-northeast of Kunda	71	15 June 1944	07:34	Il-2	PQ 26 Ost 70322; Baltic Sea, 35 km (22 mi) east-northeast of Kunda
47	26 March 1944	06:35	Il-2	PQ 26 Ost 70391; Gulf of Finland	72	28 June 1944	11:50	P-39	PQ QT-4/1
48	2 April 1944	08:35	Pe-2	PQ 26 Ost 70393 northeast of Kunda	73	29 June 1944	12:30	P-39	PQ QT-1/3
49	2 April 1944	08:39	Pe-2	PQ 26 Ost 70371; Baltic Sea, 35 km (22 mi) east-northeast of Kunda	74	29 June 1944	19:07	Il-2	PQ PS-2/9
50	2 April 1944	15:36	Il-2	PQ 26 Ost 70393; Gulf of Finland	75	30 June 1944	11:36	Il-2	PQ OS-9/4
51	3 April 1944	16:59	Il-2	PQ 26 Ost 60492; Baltic Sea, 35 km (22 mi) east-northeast of Kunda	76	30 June 1944	11:50? (Note: According to Mathews and Foreman claimed at 11:55.)	P-39	PQ OT-2/7
52	3 April 1944	17:05	Pe-2	PQ 26 Ost 60494 northeast of Kunda	77	2 July 1944	17:17	P-39	PQ OS-9/2 vicinity of Polotsk
53	3 April 1944	17:08? (Note: According to Mathews and Foreman claimed at 17:06.)	Pe-2	PQ 26 Ost 70372 northeast of Kunda	78	3 July 1944	11:42	Il-2	PQ OS-8/2 vicinity of Polotsk
54	4 April 1944	08:12	Yak-7? (Note: According to Mathews and Foreman claimed as an Ilyushin Il-2.)	PQ 26 Ost 60367 northwest of Kunda	79	3 July 1944	11:43	Il-2	PQ OS-6/7 vicinity of Polotsk
55	4 April 1944	08:15? (Note: According to Mathews and Foreman claimed at 08:05.)	Il-2	PQ 26 Ost 60442 northeast of Kunda	80	3 July 1944	11:44	Il-2	PQ OS-6/5 vicinity of Polotsk
? (Note: This claim s not listed by Prien, Stemmer, Balke and Bock.)	4 April 1944	08:42	Il-2	northeast of Kunda	— ? (Note: This unconfirmed claim is not listed by Mathews and Foreman.)	3 July 1944	—	Yak-9	
56	19 April 1944	18:36	Yak-9	PQ 26 Ost 70694; 15 km (9.3 mi) southwest of Narva	81	4 July 1944	06:44	Yak-9	PQ OS-8/6 vicinity of Polotsk
57	21 April 1944	18:27	Pe-2	PQ 26 Ost 70494; Baltic Sea, 10 km (6.2 mi) northwest of Hungerburg	82	6 July 1944	19:34	P-39	PQ OT-2/1; 45 km (28 mi) southeast of Pruzhany
58	24 April 1944	10:22	Yak-9	PQ 26 Ost 70382; Baltic Sea, 35 km (22 mi) east-northeast of Kunda					

=== Awards ===
- Iron Cross (1939) 2nd and 1st Class
- German Cross on 17 October 1944 as Feldwebel in the I./Jagdgeschwader 54
- Knight's Cross of the Iron Cross on 10 October 1944 as Oberfeldwebel and pilot in the I./Jagdgeschwader 54 (Note: According to Scherzer as pilot in the 3./Jagdgeschwader 54.)
