= Lembit Maurer =

Estonian boxer

Lembit Maurer (15 November 1929 – 22 November 2006) was an Estonian boxer and boxing coach.

He was born in Narva. In 1950 he graduated from Tallinn Physical Education school (Estonian: Tallinna Kehakultuuritehnikum). He started his boxing training in 1945, coached by Nigul Maatsoo and Martin Linnamäe.

He won two bronze medal (1953 and 1956) on Soviet Union Championships. In 1951 he won Moscow Championships. He was 8-time Baltic champion, and 5-time Estonian champion.

After boxing career, he was also a boxing coach. His most notable student was Valeri Žarikov.

He was married with Estonian swimmer Eve-Mai Maurer.
