= Meie Mats =

Award issued since 1987

Meie Mats, named after an Estonian folk song, is a yearly humour award issued since 1987 and originally initiated by Edgar Spriit, the chief editor of Pikker, a long-time Estonian humour magazine. The award is customarily announced on April 1, the April Fools' Day, and it can only be awarded to any person once, in recognition of his life work in the field of humour, satire and comedy.

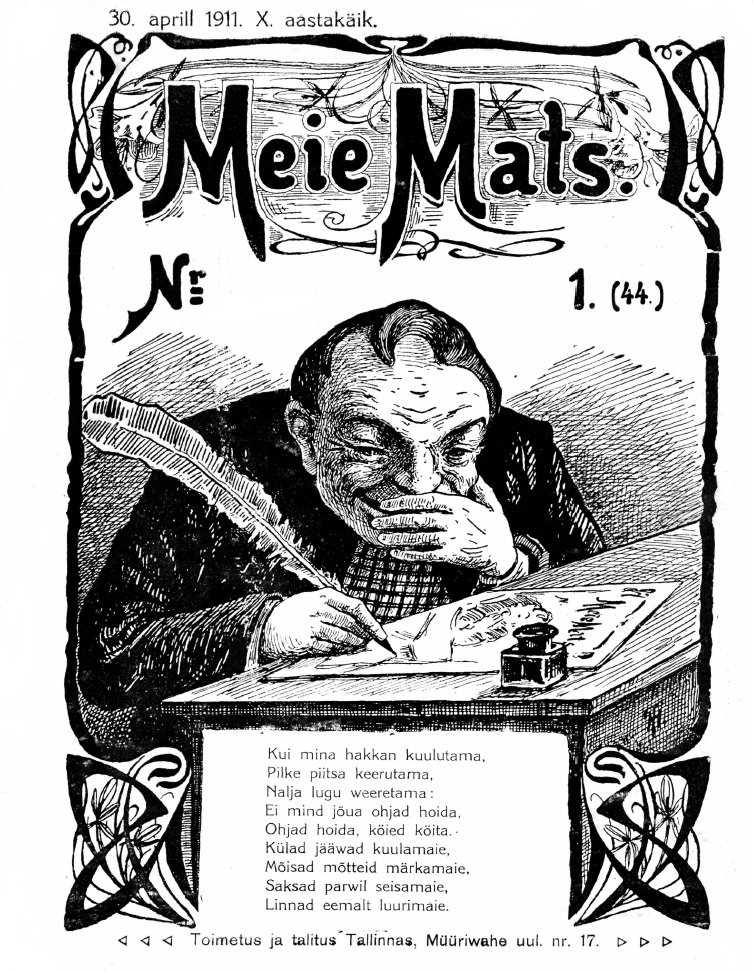
The magazine Meie Mats, 1911

== See also ==
- Category:Recipients of Meie Mats
