= Franz Mader =

German politician (1912–1988)

Franz Mader (28 January 1912 Mitteldorf – 24 October 1988 Bielefeld) was a German politician and colonel in the Wehrmacht. He sat for the FDP and later the CDU in the state parliament of North Rhine-Westphalia from 1967 to 1980.

During World War II, Mader served with the German Army (Heer) and was awarded the Knight's Cross of the Iron Cross and the German Cross in Gold. He reached the rank of colonel.

Post-War, Mader became involved in politics first with the Free Democratic Party (FDU) which he joined in 1956. and was a deputy in Bielefeld's council for over two decades. In 1967 he became a member of the Landtag of North Rhine-Westphalia and was re-elected in 1970 for the Ostwestfalen-Lippe district. In June 1970, along with Erich Mende, he was one of the co-founders of the National Liberal Action. This faction demanded that Walter Scheel be voted out of office as FDP federal chairman due to his support for Ostpolitik of the ruling coalition. After Scheel's confirmation at the FDU party conference, Mader and the NLA left the FDP and on 1 December 1971, he joined the Christian Democratic Union of Germany (CDU). In the 1975 state elections, Mader won the constituency of Bielefeld-Stadt. It was the only time that the CDU was able to win this constituency. In 1980 he did not stand for re-election to the state parliament.

== Bibliography ==
Scherzer, Veit (2007). Die Ritterkreuzträger 1939–1945 Die Inhaber des Ritterkreuzes des Eisernen Kreuzes 1939 von Heer, Luftwaffe, Kriegsmarine, Waffen-SS, Volkssturm sowie mit Deutschland verbündeter Streitkräfte nach den Unterlagen des Bundesarchives [The Knight's Cross Bearers 1939–1945 The Holders of the Knight's Cross of the Iron Cross 1939 by Army, Air Force, Navy, Waffen-SS, Volkssturm and Allied Forces with Germany According to the Documents of the Federal Archives] (in German). Jena, Germany: Scherzers Miltaer-Verlag. ISBN 978-3-938845-17-2.
