= Hans Miller =

Estonian politician

Member of the IV Riigikogu
- In office 1928 – 2 September 1930
- Succeeded by: August Johannes Salum

Personal details
- Born: 9 April 1890 Tartu County, Russian Empire
- Died: 3 April 1952 (aged 61) Stockholm, Sweden

Hans Miller (9 April 1890 Väike-Konguta Parish, Tartu County – 3 April 1952 Stockholm) was an Estonian politician. He was a member of IV Riigikogu. On 2 September 1930, he resigned his position and he was replaced by August Salum.
