= Lembit Vahesaar =

Estonian chess and draughts referee and sports official

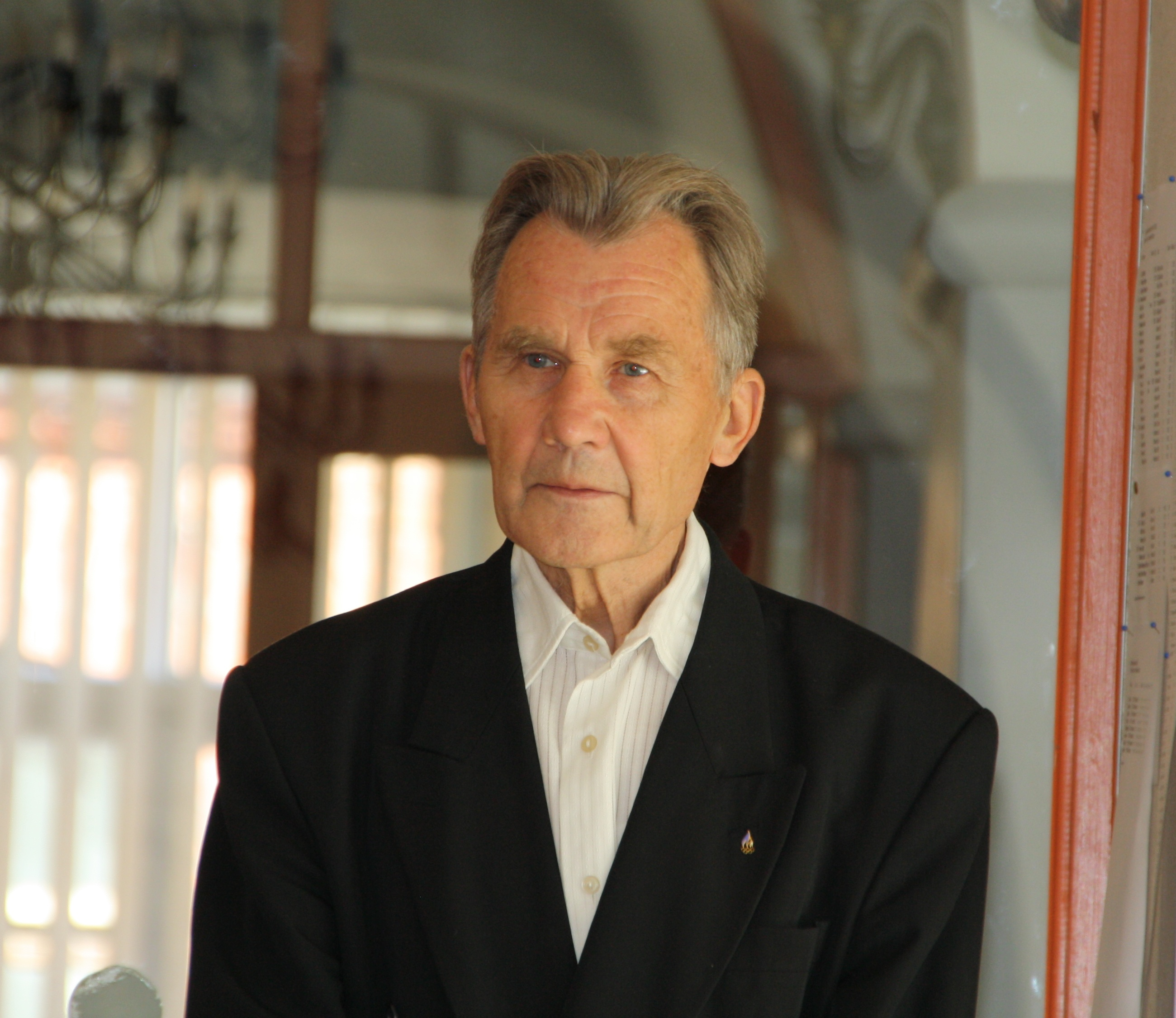
Vahesaar in 2009

Lembit Vahesaar (2 February 1936 in Tallinn – 25 April 2013 in Tallinn) was an Estonian chess and draughts referee and sports official. He was the best chess coach and organizer in 20th century in Estonia.

In 1960 he graduated from Tallinn Pedagogical Institute (as an Estonian language, literature, and history teacher).

His chess coach studies were done under the guidance of Kaljus Pettai. Since 1969 he has the highest coach license of FIDE. He was a coach in four matches in World Chess Championships.

During 1991-2002 he was permanent representative of Estonia to FIDE. During 1990-1992 he was the president of Estonian Chess Federation.

During 1992-2000 he was a member of Estonian Olympic Committee.
