= List of members of the Rahvuskogu =

The following is a list of members of the Rahvuskogu, the bicameral Estonian National Assembly which was convened after the 1936 Estonian National Assembly referendum received popular support to draft a new constitution. The First Chamber had 80 members and was elected (although opposition parties were not allowed to stand), and the Second Chamber contained 40 representatives of corporate chambers. Elections for the First Chamber were held in December 1936 and the Rahvuskogu sat between 18 February 1937 and 17 August 1937, approving a new constitution. The Riigikogu was substantially reformed and sat for its sixth session the following year.

== List of members of the First Chamber ==
Source: Jaan Toomla, Valitud ja Valitsenud: Eesti parlamentaarsete ja muude esinduskogude ning valitsuste isikkoosseis aastail 1917–1999 (National Library of Estonia, 1999), pp. 67–68.

- Aleksander Arak
- Eduard Arnover
- Taavet Avarmaa (Akermann)
- Kaarel Eenpalu (Einbund)
- Valter-Gerhard Freimann (Kadarik)
- Ernst Haabpiht (Habicht)
- Mihkel Hansen
- Johan Hansing
- Jaan Järve
- Mihkel Jürisson (Jüris)
- August Jürman (Jürmann or Jürima)
- August Jürman (Jürmann or Jürima)
- Juhan Kaarlimäe (Karlsberg)
- Jakob Kalju
- Jakob Kalle
- Aleksander-Oskar Karineel (Kornel)
- Karl Ferdinand Karlson
- Oskar Kask
- Artur Kasterpalu
- Tõnis Kind (Kint)
- August Kohver (Kotter)
- Jaan Kokk
- Lembit Kolk
- Karl Eduard Kompus
- Evald Konno
- Valter Krimm
- Jakob Kristelstein
- Kustav Kurg
- Mihail Kurtschinsky
- Peeter Kõpp
- August Laur
- Heinrich Lauri
- August Lepik (Leppik)
- Artur-Aleksander Linholm (Linari)
- Oskar Lõvi
- August Miljan
- Alfred Mõttus
- Alfred Mäeloog
- August Mälk
- Enn Nurmiste (Neuhaus)
- Ants Oidermaa (Oidermann)
- Ludvig Ojaveski (Mühlbach)
- Aleksander Ossipov
- Jüri Ottas
- Johannes Paabusk (Pabusk)
- Karl-Eduard Pajos (Pajus)
- Johannes Perens
- Juhan Piirimaa (Freimuth)
- Juhan Pitka
- Otto Pukk
- Karl Puusemp
- Otto-Rudolf Pärlin
- Viktor Päts
- Eduard Riismann (Riisna)
- Ants Roos
- Vladimir Roslavlev
- Martin Rõigas
- Mihkel Rõuk
- Johan-Oskar Rütli
- Karl Theodor Saarmann
- Karl Selter
- Oskar Silde
- Oskar Albert Suursööt
- Priit Suve (Zube)
- Toomas Takjas (Takkias)
- Hendrik Tallo
- Nikolai Talts
- Henn Treial
- Jaan Treumann
- Mihkel Truusööt
- Artur Tupits
- Anton Uesson
- Jüri Uluots
- Juhan Uuemaa (Neumann)
- August Vann
- Richard Veermaa (Vreeman)
- Aleksander August Veiderma (Veidermann)
- Mihkel-Voldemar Vellema (Velberg)
- Värdi Velner
- Julius Voolaid (Vollmann)

== List of members of the Second Chamber ==
Source: Jaan Toomla, Valitud ja Valitsenud: Eesti parlamentaarsete ja muude esinduskogude ning valitsuste isikkoosseis aastail 1917–1999 (National Library of Estonia, 1999), pp. 68–69.

- Friedrich Karl Akel
- Ado Anderkopp
- Johannes-Leopold Antik
- Linda Eenpalu
- David Grimm
- Heinrich Gutkin
- Johan Haagivang
- Johan Holberg
- Jüri Jaakson
- Alma Jeets
- Aleksander Kask
- Paul Kogerman
- Oskar Koplus
- Hugo Villi Kukke
- Eduard Laaman
- Kaarel Liidak (Liideman)
- Karl Luik
- Jüri Marksoo (Markson)
- Aleksander Naeres (Naeris)
- Viktor Neggo
- Johannes Orasmaa (Roska)
- Anton Palvadre
- Aleksander Paulus
- Ants Piip
- Johann Post
- Joakim Puhk
- Mihkel Pung
- Hugo-Bernhard Rahamägi
- Aleksander Rei
- Jaak Reichmann
- Karl Robert Ruus
- Aleksander Saar
- Karl Schlossmann
- Johan Sepp
- Jaan Soots
- Priit Suit
- Harald Tammer
- Aleksander Tõnisson
- Aleksander Veiler
- Hellmuth Weiss
