= Members of the 3rd Riigikogu =

Members of Parliament of Estonia 1926–1929

This is a list of members of the third legislative session of the Estonian Parliament (Riigikogu) following the 1926 elections (held on 15–17 May 1926). It sat between 15 June 1926 and 14 June 1929, before the next round of elections were held.

== Officers ==
The following is a list of the Riigikogu's officers during the third legislative session:

=== Chairman ===
Karl Einbund, from 22 June 1926

=== First Assistant Chairman ===
Mihkel Martna, from 22 June 1926

=== Second Assistant Chairman ===
Rudolf Penno, from 22 June 1926

=== Secretary ===
Mihkel Juhkam, 22 June 1926 – 6 December 1928

August Tamman, from 11 December 1928

=== First Assistant Secretary ===
Karl-Ferdinand Kornel, 22 June 1926 – 23 July 1926

Oskar Karl Johann Liigand, from 23 July 1926

=== Second Assistant Secretary ===
Jaan Piiskar, from 22 June 1926

== List of members ==
Name	Start of term	End of term
Paul Abramson	Start of session	7 July 1926 (replaced by Theodor Maurer)
Mart Adamson	15 October 1926 (replacing Aksel Herman Rüütli)	End of session
Hans Ainson	Start of session	12 January 1927 (replaced by Mart Martinson)
Friedrich Karl Akel	Start of session	2 May 1928 (replaced by Hans Leesment)
Ado Anderkopp	Start of session	End of session
Hendrik Anniko	Start of session	1 October 1928 (replaced by Hans Pöhl)
Konrad Arras	10 February 1927 (replacing August Kohveri)	End of session
Karl Ast	Start of session	End of session
Karl August Baars	Start of session	End of session
Peeter Baranin	Start of session	End of session
Kaarel August Eenpalu	Start of session	End of session
Bernhard Eilman	Start of session	End of session
Hendrik Elisson	Start of session	End of session
Karl Oskar Freiberg	Start of session	End of session
Johannes Fuks	Start of session	End of session
Vassili Grigorjev	Start of session	End of session
Arnold Grimpel	Start of session	4 December 1928 (replaced by Mihkel Krents)
Oskar Gustavson	Start of session	End of session
Werner Richard Karl Hasselblatt	Start of session	End of session
Mihkel Hellman	1 October 1928 (replacing Benedikt Oskar Oja)	End of session
Johan Holberg	Start of session	End of session
Jakob Homin	1 October 1928 (replacing Nikita Semjonovi)	End of session
Jaan Hünerson	Start of session	End of session
Jüri Jaakson	Start of session	11 November 1926 (replaced by Jaan Mälberg)
Ado Johanson	Start of session	End of session
Leopold Johannes Johanson	Start of session	End of session
Erich Jonas	Start of session	1 June 1929 (replaced by Aleksander Pärn)
Mihkel Juhkam	Start of session	End of session
Aleksander Jõeäär	Start of session	End of session
Peeter Järve	Start of session	End of session
August Jürima	Start of session	End of session
Aleksander Kaal	Start of session	24 September 1926 (replaced by Otto Pukk)
Karl Kaal	23 January 1928 (replacing Johannes-Rudolf Normani)	End of session
Kristjan Kaarna	Start of session	24 October 1928 (replaced by Ernst Rosenberg)
Tõnis Kalbus	Start of session	End of session
Alo Karineel	18 November 1926 (replacing Heinrich Laretei)	End of session
Oskar Kask	Start of session	End of session
August Kerem	Start of session	End of session
Albert Kevend	17 November 1926 (replacing Otto Pärlini)	19 January 1927 (replaced by Artur Tupits)
Heinrich Richard Kiiver	Start of session	16 May 1927 (replaced by Gustv-Eduard Lorenz)
Eduard Kink	1 July 1926 (replacing Alma Ostra-Oinase)	End of session
Johannes Klesment	Start of session	End of session
August Kohver	Start of session	10 February 1927 (replaced by Konrad Arras)
Voldemar Korjus	4 December 1928 (replacing Jakob Westholm)	End of session
Karl-Ferdinand Kornel	Start of session	End of session
Mihkel Krents	4 December 1928 (replacing Arnold Grimpel)	End of session
Eduard Krüger	Start of session	22 June 1926 (replaced by Carl Schilling)
Mihail Kurtschinski	Start of session	End of session
Aleksander Kärner	Start of session	End of session
Oskar Köster	Start of session	End of session
Mats Laarmann	Start of session	End of session
Johan Laidoner	Start of session	End of session
Heinrich Laretei	Start of session	18 November 1926. (replaced by Aleksander Oskar Karineel)
Jaan Lattik	Start of session	End of session
August Laur	Start of session	End of session
Hans Leesment	2 May 1928 (replacing Friedrich Karl Akeli)	End of session
Johannes Lehtman	Start of session	End of session
Oskar Karl Johann Liigand	Start of session	End of session
Verner Liik	Start of session	16 June 1926 (replaced by Benedikt Oskar Oja)
Jaagup Loosalu	Start of session	End of session
Gustav-Eduard Lorenz	16 May 1927 (replacing Heinrich Richard Kiiveri)	End of session
August Luik	21 June 1926 (replacing Rosalie Verneri)	7 May 1928 (replaced by Konstantin Veiss)
Villem Maaker	Start of session	End of session
Hans Martinson	Start of session	End of session
Märt Martinson	12 January 1927 (replacing Hans Ainsoni)	End of session
Mihkel Martna	Start of session	End of session
Theodor Maurer	7 July 1926 (replacing Paul Abramsoni)	End of session
Alfred Julius Mõttus	Start of session	End of session
Jaan Mälberg	11 November 1926 (replacing Jüri Jaaksoni)	End of session
Johannes Mürk	Start of session	End of session
Johannes-Rudolf Norman	4 January 1928 (replacing Karl Johannes Virma)	23 January 1928 (replaced by Karl Kaal)
Aleksander Oinas	Start of session	End of session
Benedikt Oskar Oja	16 June 1926 (replacing Verner Liik)	1 October 1928 (replaced by Mihkel Hellman)
Alma Ostra-Oinas	Start of session	1 July 1926. (replaced by Eduard Kink)
Jüri Ottas	Start of session	End of session
Anton Palvadre	Start of session	30 July 1926 (replaced by Alfred Vainola)
Rudolf Penno	Start of session	End of session
Eduard Pesur	Start of session	End of session
Jaan Piiskar	Start of session	End of session
Theodor Pool	Start of session	End of session
Otto Pukk	24 September 1926 (replacing Aleksander Kaalu)	End of session
Peeter Siegfried Põld	Start of session	30 September 1926 (replaced by August Tõllasepp)
Otto-Rudolf Pärlin	Start of session	17 November 1926 (replaced by Albert Kevend)
Aleksander Pärn	1 June 1929 (replacing Erich Jonase)	End of session
Konstantin Päts	Start of session	End of session
Hans Pöhl	1 October 1928 (replacing Hendrik Anniko)	End of session
Aleksander Leopold Raudkepp	Start of session	End of session
Hans Rebane	Start of session	End of session
August Rei	Start of session	End of session
Ernst Rosenberg	24 October 1928 (replacing Kristjan Kaarna)	End of session
Aksel Herman Rüütli	Start of session	15 October 1926 (replaced by Mart Adamson)
Jakob Saar	Start of session	End of session
Carl Schilling	22 June 1926 (replacing Eduard Krügeri)	End of session
Arnold Paul Schulbach	Start of session	End of session
Peeter Schütz	Start of session	End of session
Nikita Semjonov	Start of session	1 October 1928 (replaced by Jakob Homin)
Juhan Sepp	Start of session	End of session
Johannes Sikkar	Start of session	End of session
Karl-Johannes Soonpää	Start of session	End of session
Jaan Soots	Start of session	End of session
August Sprenk	Start of session	End of session
Aleksander Sternfeld	Start of session	End of session
Otto August Strandman	Start of session	22 April 1927 (replaced by August Tamman)
Edgar Sulg	Start of session	End of session
Johannes-Friedrich Zimmermann	Start of session	End of session
Theodor Tallmeister	Start of session	End of session
Karl Tamm	Start of session	End of session
August Tamman	22 April 1927 (replacing Otto August Strandmani)	End of session
Jaan Teemant	Start of session	End of session
Jaan Teetsov	Start of session	End of session
Otto Tief	Start of session	End of session
Jaan Tiks	Start of session	End of session
Kustas Tonkmann	Start of session	End of session
Aleksander-Rudolf Toomel	Start of session	End of session
Artur Tupits	19 January 1927 (replacing Albert Kevendi)	End of session
August Tõllasepp	30 September 1926 (replacing Peeter Siegfried Põllu)	End of session
Jaan Tõnisson	Start of session	End of session
August Usai	6 December 1926 (replacing Alfred Vainola)	End of session
Jaan Vain	Start of session	End of session
Alfred Vainola	30 July 1926 (replacing Anton Palvadre)	6 December 1926 (replaced by August Usai)
Richard Veermaa	Start of session	End of session
Aleksander Veiler	Start of session	End of session
Konstantin Veiss	7 May 1928 (replacing August Luige)	End of session
Rosalie Verner	Start of session	21 May 1926 (replaced by August Luik)
Willem Vessart	Start of session	End of session
Jakob Westholm	Start of session	4 December 1928 (replaced by Voldemar Korjus)
Karl Johannes Virma	Start of session	4 January 1928 (replaced by Johannes-Rudolf Norman)
Jüri Voiman	Start of session	End of session
August Vomm	Start of session	End of session

== Further information ==
- "III Riigikogu koosseis [Composition of the third Riigikogu]", Riigikogu (in Estonian).
