= Mihkel =

Male given name

- Gender: Male
- Language: Estonian
- Name day: 29 September

Origin
- Region of origin: Estonia

Other names
- Related names: Mikk

Mihkel is an Estonian masculine given name, a version of Michael.

People named Mihkel include:

- Mihkel Ainsalu (born 1996), footballer
- Mihkel Aitsam (1877–1953), writer, journalist and local historian
- Mihkel Aksalu (born 1984), football goalkeeper
- Mikk-Mihkel Arro (born 1984), decathlete
- Mihkel Härms (1874–1941), ornithologist
- Mihkel Hellermaa (1891–1942), politician
- Mihkel Järveoja (born 1986), orienteer
- Mihkel Juhkam (1884–1942), politician
- Mihkel Jürna (1899–1972), writer and translator
- Mihkel Kaljurand (born 1945), chemist
- Mihkel Kerem (born 1981), composer and violinist
- Mihkel Kirves (born 1996), basketball player
- Mihkel Klaassen (1880–1952), judge
- Mihkel Kraav (born 1966), historian, data communications specialist and politician
- Mihkel Kukk (born 1983), javelin thrower
- Mihkel Lepper (1900–1980), actor
- Mihkel Leppik (1932–2021), rowing coach
- Mihkel Lüdig (1880–1958), composer, organist and choir conductor
- Mihkel Martna (1860–1934), politician and journalist
- Mihkel Mathiesen (1918–2003), statesman
- Mihkel Mattisen (born 1976), musician, pop singer, songwriter and music producer
- Mihkel Mihkelson (1899–1943), politician
- Mihkel Mutt (born 1953), writer and arts journalist
- Mihkel Poll (born 1986), pianist
- Mihkel Pung (1876–1941), politician
- Mihkel Raud (born 1969), musician, television personality and politician
- Mihkel Rõuk (1891–1941), politician
- Mihkel Truusööt (1903–1993), politician and businessman
- Mihkel Tüür (born 1976), architect
- Mihkel Veiderma (1929–2018), chemist
- Mihkel Veske (1843–1890), poet and linguist

== See also ==
- Mihkel (film), a 2018 Icelandic-Estonian film
