= Alfred Vainola =

Estonian politician

Alfred Vainola (also Alfred Sandt; 9 August 1894, in Tsooru Parish, Võru County – 16 April 1942) was an Estonian politician. He was a member of III Riigikogu. He was a member of the Riigikogu since 30 July 1926. He replaced Anton Palvadre. On 6 December 1926, he resigned his position and he was replaced by August Usai.
