= Eduard Krüger =

Eduard Krüger may refer to:

- Eduard Krüger (architect) (1901–1967), German architect
- Eduard Krüger (equestrian) (1893–1963), German equestrian
- Eduard Krüger (politician) (fl. 1926), Estonian politician
- Eduard Krüger (music historian) (1807–1885), German musicologist, composer and philologist
