= Albert Kevend =

Estonian politician

Albert Kevend (20 January 1883 Kambja Parish, Tartu County – July 1945 Karaganda Oblast, Kazakh SSR) was an Estonian politician. He was a member of III Riigikogu. He was a member of the Riigikogu since 17 November 1926. He replaced Otto Pärlin. On 19 January 1927, he resigned his position and he was replaced by Artur Tupits.
