= Suve =

Suve is a surname. Notable people with the surname include:

- Priit Suve (1901–1942), Estonian lawyer
- Sosefo Suve (fl. 2012), Wallisian politician
