= List of military attachés in World War I =

The functions of a military attaché are illustrated by the American military attachés in Japan during the war years. A series of military officers had been assigned to the American diplomatic mission in Tokyo since 1901 when the US and Japan were co-operating closely in response to the Boxer Rebellion in China. The military attaché advised the United States Ambassador to Japan on military matters, acted as a liaison between US Army and the Imperial General Headquarters, and gathered and disseminated intelligence. The military attaché's office in Tokyo usually had two assistants and a number of "language officers" who were assigned specifically to learn Japanese whilst attached to Japanese Imperial Army regiments as observers. These "language officers" translated training and technical manuals and reported on conditions in Japanese military units.

== Selected military attachés serving with Entente powers ==
=== Russia ===
- Nakajima Masatake, Japan (1915).
- Mitsumasa Yonai, Japan (1915).
- Vidkun Quisling, Norway (1918).

=== France ===
- James Collins, US (1917).

=== United Kingdom ===
- Arne Dagfin Dahl, Norway (1916-1919).
- Teijiro Toyoda, Japan (1914).
- Nicholas Alexandrovich Wolkoff, Russia (1913-1919)

=== United States ===
- Lieutenant Colonel Karl F. Baldwin, Japan (1917–1919).
- Lieutenant Colonel Halsey E. Yates, Romania (1916-1920).
- Lieutenant Colonel James A. Ruggles, Russia (1918).
- Captain Franz von Papen, Germany (1913-1915) (Note: Franz von Papen was at the same time the military attache for the USA and for Mexico.) (Note: At a time when the United States was officially neutral.)

=== Japan ===
- Kichisaburo Nomura, Japan (1914–1918).
- Major-General Katsusugu Iouye, Japan (1917–1919); awarded Distinguished Service Medal.
- Lieutenant Colonel T. Mizumachi, Japan (1917–1919); awarded Distinguished Service Medal.
- Captain Hsiao Watari, Japan (1917–1919); awarded Distinguished Service Medal.

=== Belgium ===
- Arne Dagfin Dahl, Norway (1917-1919).

== Selected military attachés serving with Central powers ==
=== Germany ===
- Joseph E. Kuhn, US (1915–1916).

=== Ottoman Empire ===
- Lt. Col. R.H. Williams

== Selected military attachés of fighting powers serving with Neutral countries ==
=== Persia ===
- Georg von Kanitz, Germany

=== Mexico ===
- Captain Franz von Papen, Germany (1913-1916)

== See also ==
- List of participants to Paris Peace Conference, 1919
- Military attachés and observers in the Russo-Japanese War
- United Nations Military Observer
