= Haldi =

Haldi may refer to:

- Ḫaldi, a Urartian god
- Haldi, Baltistan, a village in Pakistan
- Haldi, Estonia, a village
- Haldi River, a river in West Bengal, India
- Turmeric (haldi in Indic languages), a spice
  - Haldi (ceremony), application of turmeric as a wedding ceremony
  - Gaye holud, application of turmeric in Bengali weddings

== See also ==
- Halady, a village in Karnataka, India
- Varahi River or Halady river, in southern India
- Halady Srinivas Shetty, an Indian politician
