= Lepik =

Family name

Lepik or Leppik is a common Estonian surname (meaning "alder forest"), with notable bearers including:

Lepik

- Andres Lepik (born 1957), actor
- August Lepik (1881–1955), politician
- Kalju Lepik (1920–1999), poet
- Krista Lepik (born 1964), biathlete
- Liina Kersna (née Lepik; born 1980), journalist and politician
- Liis Lepik (born 1994), footballer
- Mait Lepik (born 1968), actor
- Margus Lepik (born 1969), politician
- Mark Anders Lepik (born 2000), footballer
- Ülo Lepik (1921–2022), mathematician and mechanics researcher

Leppik

- Elmar Leppik (1878–1978), mycologist
- Mihkel Leppik (1932–2021), rowing coach
- Sakarias Jaan Leppik (born 1969), priest, musician and journalist
- Silver Leppik (born 1983), basketball player
