= List of participants in the Paris Peace Conference (1919–1920) =

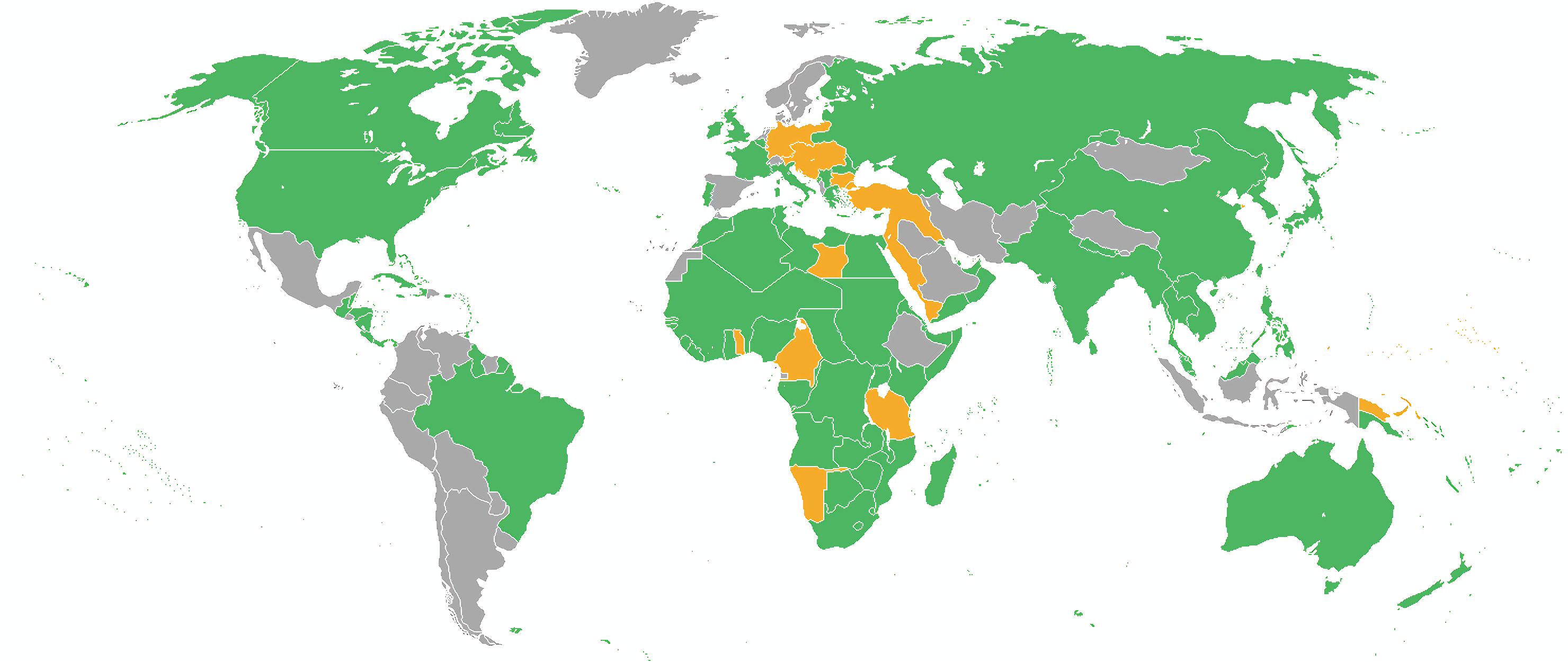
Map of the World with the Participants in World War I. The Allies are depicted in green, the Central Powers in orange, and neutral countries in grey.

The Paris Peace Conference gathered over 30 nations at the Quai d'Orsay in Paris, France, to shape the future after World War I. The Russian SFSR was not invited to attend, having already concluded a peace treaty with the Central Powers in the spring of 1918. The Central Powers - Austria-Hungary, Germany, Bulgaria and the Ottoman Empire - were not allowed to attend the conference until after the details of all the peace treaties had been elaborated and agreed upon. The main result of the conference was the Treaty of Versailles with Germany.

== Signing delegations ==
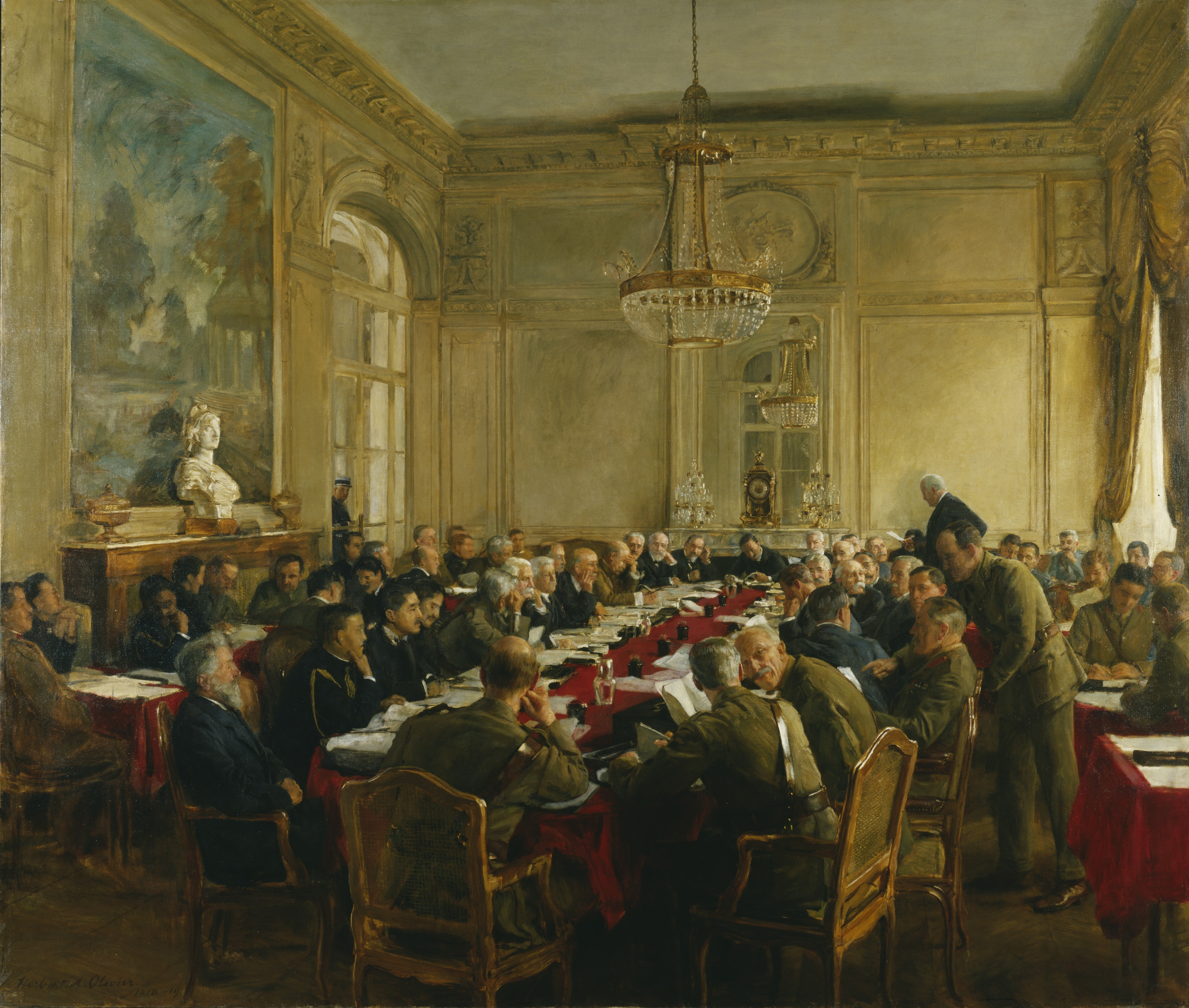
The main delegations, with their secretaries and interpreters, in a painting by Herbert Arnould Olivier.

This list shows all nations and delegations who signed the Treaty of Versailles. All plenipotentiaries signed the treaty, except where indicated otherwise.

State	Plenipotentiaries	Notes
Australia	Billy Hughes; Joseph Cook	
Bolivia	Ismael Montes	
Belgium	Paul Hymans; Jules Van den Heuvel; Emile Vandervelde	
Brazil	João Pandiá Calógeras; Rodrigo Otávio de Langgaard Menezes	
Canada	Robert Borden (Note: Non-signatory); Charles Doherty; Arthur Sifton	Signed under 'British Empire'. Prime Minister Borden fought for Canada to have its own seat at the Conference, which the British and Americans eventually relented to, opening the doors to allowing Australia, New Zealand, Newfoundland, and South Africa to send representatives as well. Borden also insisted that he be included among those leaders to sign the Treaty of Versailles; however, it was agreed that Canada would sign under the British Empire.
China	Lu Zhengxiang; Wellington Koo; Cao Rulin	Many in China felt betrayed as the German territory in China was handed to Japan. Wellington Koo refused to sign the treaty and the Chinese delegation was the only nation that did not sign the Treaty of Versailles at the signing ceremony. At the time of the Paris Peace Conference there were two governments claiming to be the legitimate government of China: the Beiyang Government in Beijing, and Dr Sun Yat-sen's Guangzhou based Kuomintang (KMT) movement. However, they worked together to create the united diplomatic team that would plead China's case in Paris.
Cuba	Antonio Sánchez de Bustamante y Sirven	
Czechoslovakia	Karel Kramář; Edvard Beneš	
Ecuador	Enrique Darn y de Alsua	
France	Georges Clemenceau; Stephen Pichon; Louis-Lucien Klotz; André Tardieu; Jules Cambon	
Germany	Hermann Müller; Johannes Bell	Germany were excluded from the negotiations, but Hermann Müller and Johannes Bell, as government ministers in the new Weimar Republic, signed the treaty as representatives of Germany on 29 June 1919.
Greece	Eleftherios Venizelos; Nicolas Politis	
Guatemala	Joaquín Méndez	
Haiti	Tertullien Guilbaud	
Hejaz	Rustam Haidar; Abdul Hadi Aouni	Later absorbed into Saudi Arabia.
Honduras	Policarpo Bonilla	
India	Edwin Samuel Montagu; Ganga Singh	
Italy	Vittorio Emanuele Orlando; Sidney Sonnino; Guglielmo Imperiali; Silvio Crespi	
Japan	Saionji Kinmochi; Makino Nobuaki; Chinda Sutemi; Matsui Keishirō	
Liberia	Charles D. B. King	
New Zealand	William Ferguson Massey	
Nicaragua	Salvador Chamorro	
Panama	Antonio Burgos	
Peru	Carlos de Candamo	
Poland	Ignacy Jan Paderewski; Roman Dmowski	
Portugal	Afonso Costa; Augusto Soares	
Romania	Ion I. C. Brătianu; Constantin Coandă	
Serbs, Croats and Slovenes	Nikola Pašić; Ante Trumbić; Milenko Radomar Vesnić; Slobodan Jovanović; Miodrag Ibrovac	Later Kingdom of Yugoslavia
Siam	Charoonsakdi Kritakara; Traidos Prabandhu	
South Africa	Jan Smuts; Louis Botha	
United Kingdom	David Lloyd George; Bonar Law; Alfred Milner, 1st Viscount Milner; Arthur Balfour; George Barnes	
United States	Woodrow Wilson; Robert Lansing; Henry White; Edward M. House; Tasker H. Bliss	See also American Commission to Negotiate Peace.
Uruguay	Juan Antonio Buero	

== Other national representatives ==
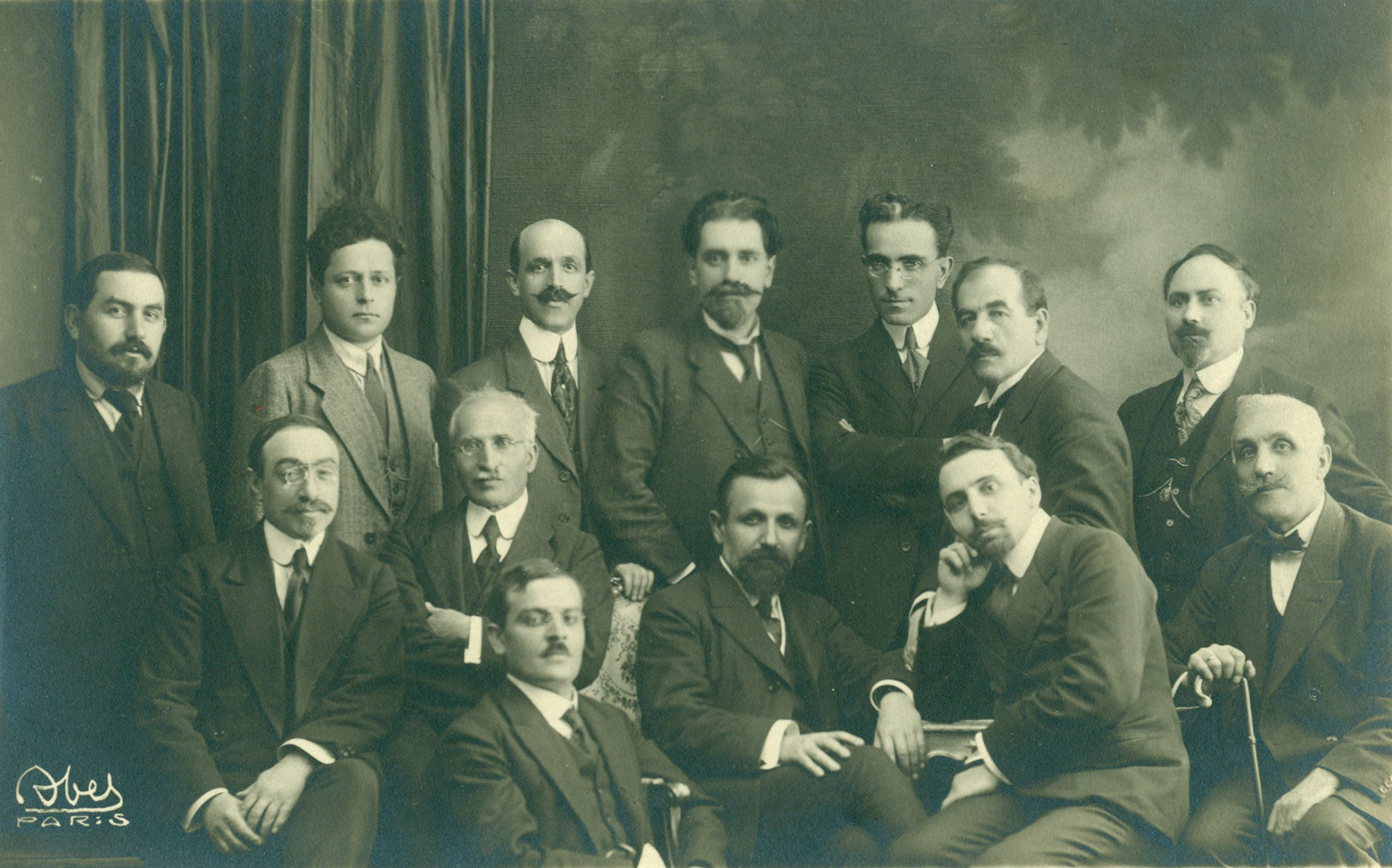
Delegation from the First Republic of Armenia during the Paris Peace Conference.

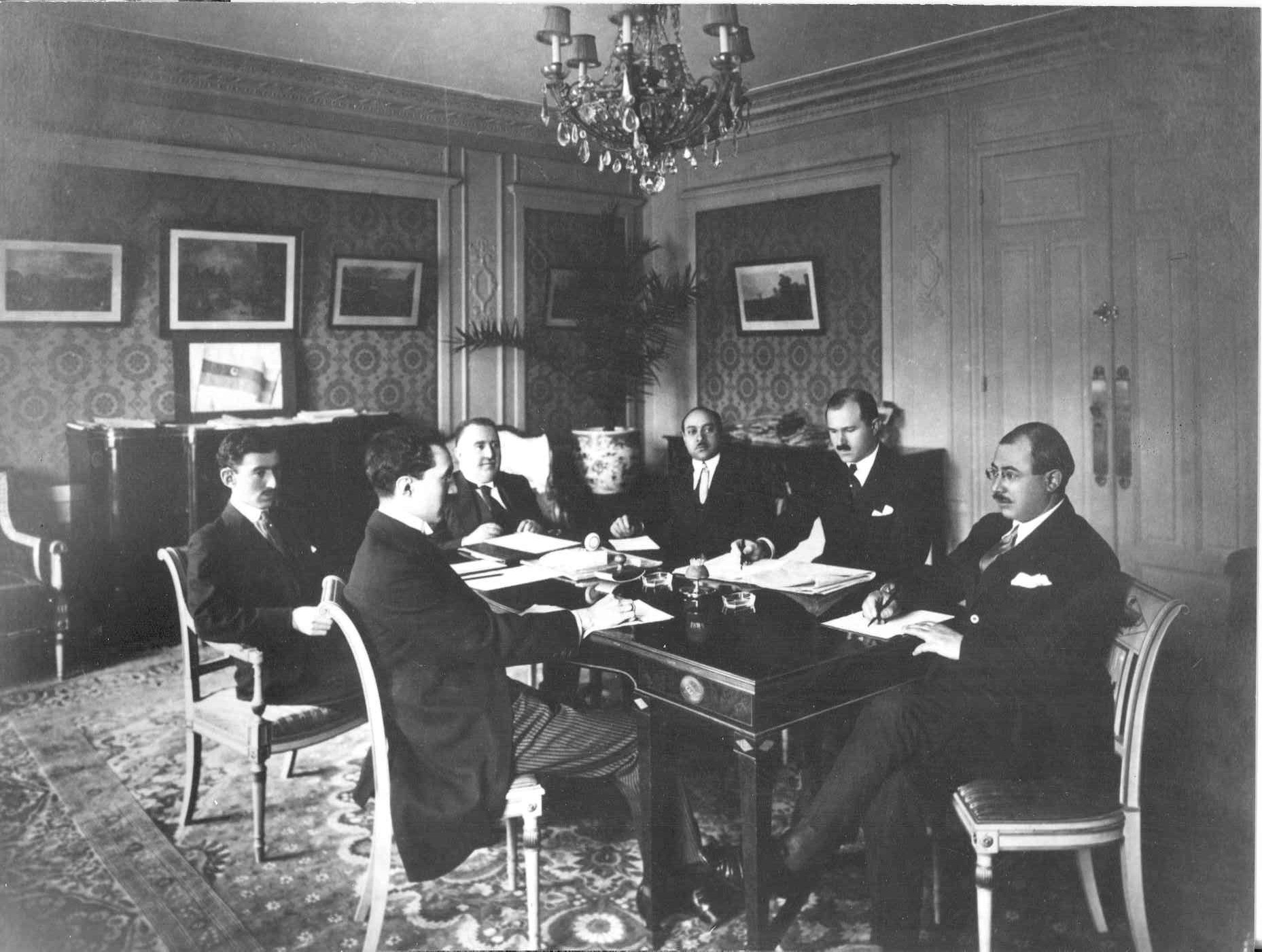
Delegation from the Democratic Republic of Azerbaijan in Hôtel Claridge during the Paris Peace Conference.

Despite not signing the treaties, other delegations were sent to the Paris Peace Conferences, some uninvited, in order to represent their national interests.

Nation	Representatives	Notes
Arab delegation	Faisal; Lawrence of Arabia	Faisal, later King of Iraq, advocated for an independent Arab state. T. E. Lawrence acted as the delegation's translator.
First Republic of Armenia	Avetis Aharonian; Hamo Ohanjanyan; Armen Garo	
Aromanian delegation	National Committee of the Pindus	Attempted to establish an autonomous Aromanian entity.
Assyrian delegation	Bishop Aphrem Baroum	Attempted to establish an autonomous Assyrian entity in the Assyrian homeland.
Democratic Republic of Azerbaijan	Alimardan bey Topchubashov	
Belarusian Democratic Republic	Anton Luckievich	Attempted to gain international recognition of the independence of Belarus.
Estonia	Jaan Poska; Nikolai Köstner; Jaan Tõnisson; Ants Piip; Karl Robert Pusta; Mihkel Martna; Eduard Laaman; Joakim Puhk	Attempted to gain recognition of the independence of Estonia.
Ethiopian Empire	Dejazmach Tafari; Dejazmatch Nadew	Sought international recognition of its territorial integrity and independence from Italian Eritrea, British Somaliland and French Somaliland. Also wanted to be considered not a "barbarous state" but rather a "civilised [African] country" with unique interests, so that it might strengthen its position on the world stage as a subject of international law, being capable of participating in the international arena instead of remaining isolated.
Democratic Republic of Georgia	Nikolay Chkheidze; Irakli Tsereteli; Zurab Avalishvili	
Irish Republic	Seán T. O'Kelly	The unrecognized Irish Republic sent representatives in hope the republic declared at the Easter Rising in 1916 would be recognised, but they were ignored.
Korean Provisional Government	Kim Kyu-sik	Representing the Provisional Government of the Republic of Korea, in-exile in China.
(Kurdistan Region) Kurdish delegation	Şerif Pasha	Representing Society for the Rise of Kurdistan and its goal to establish an independent country, or an autonomous entity, in Kurdistan.
Zionist Organization	Dr. Chaim Weizmann	Lobbied for the establishment of a Jewish state in Palestine.
Lebanon	Daoud Amoun (first delegation); Elias Peter Hoayek (second delegation); Abdullah El-Khoury (third delegation)	Three separate delegations were sent to attempt to: expand the borders of Mount Lebanon Mutasarrifate and to gain recognition of the independence of Lebanon.
Latvia	Jānis Čakste	Attempted to gain recognition of the independence of Latvia.
Lithuania	Augustinas Voldemaras; Antanas Smetona	Attempted to gain recognition of the independence of Lithuania.
Montenegro	Nicholas I of Montenegro	The unification of Serbia and Montenegro on 18 November 1918 was contested by the exiled king of Montenegro. Despite Italian support, Montenegro was denied an official seat at the Peace Conferences, and the unification of Serbia and Montenegro was recognised.
Newfoundland	William F. Lloyd	
Mountainous Republic of the Northern Caucasus	Abdulmajid Tapa Tchermoeff	
(Iran) Persia	Mostowfi ol-Mamalek; Vosugh od-Dowleh; Mohammad Ali Foroughi	Iranians, as a neutral power, negotiated war reparations to both, Allies and Central Powers (suggesting Ottoman and Russian territory) due to Persian campaign. Also solicited French or American help to seizure independence from Anglo-Russian spheres of influence in Persia.
Russia	Sergey Sazonov	The Allied Powers refused to recognise the Bolshevik government of Russia, and instead invited representatives of the Russian Provisional Government (chaired by Prince Lvov), the successor to the Russian Constituent Assembly and the political arm of the Russian White movement.
San Marino	M. Bucquet	
Syria	Chekri Ganem; Jamil Mardam Bey	See Central Syrian Committee.
Tripolitanian Republic		Lobbied for the independence of Tripolitania from Italian Libya.
Ukrainian People's Republic	Hryhorii Sydorenko; Mykhailo Tyshkevych	Lobbied for the independence of Ukraine and for support in its war against Russia.
Vietnam	Nguyen Ai Quoc	Nguyen Ai Quoc (later known as Ho Chi Minh) petitioned the conference, seeking self determination and independence for the Vietnamese people.
West Ukrainian People's Republic	Vasyl Paneiko	Until December 1919, part of the Ukrainian People's Republic mission. Following negotiations with Poland, lobbied for the independence of West Ukraine.

== Non-national representatives ==
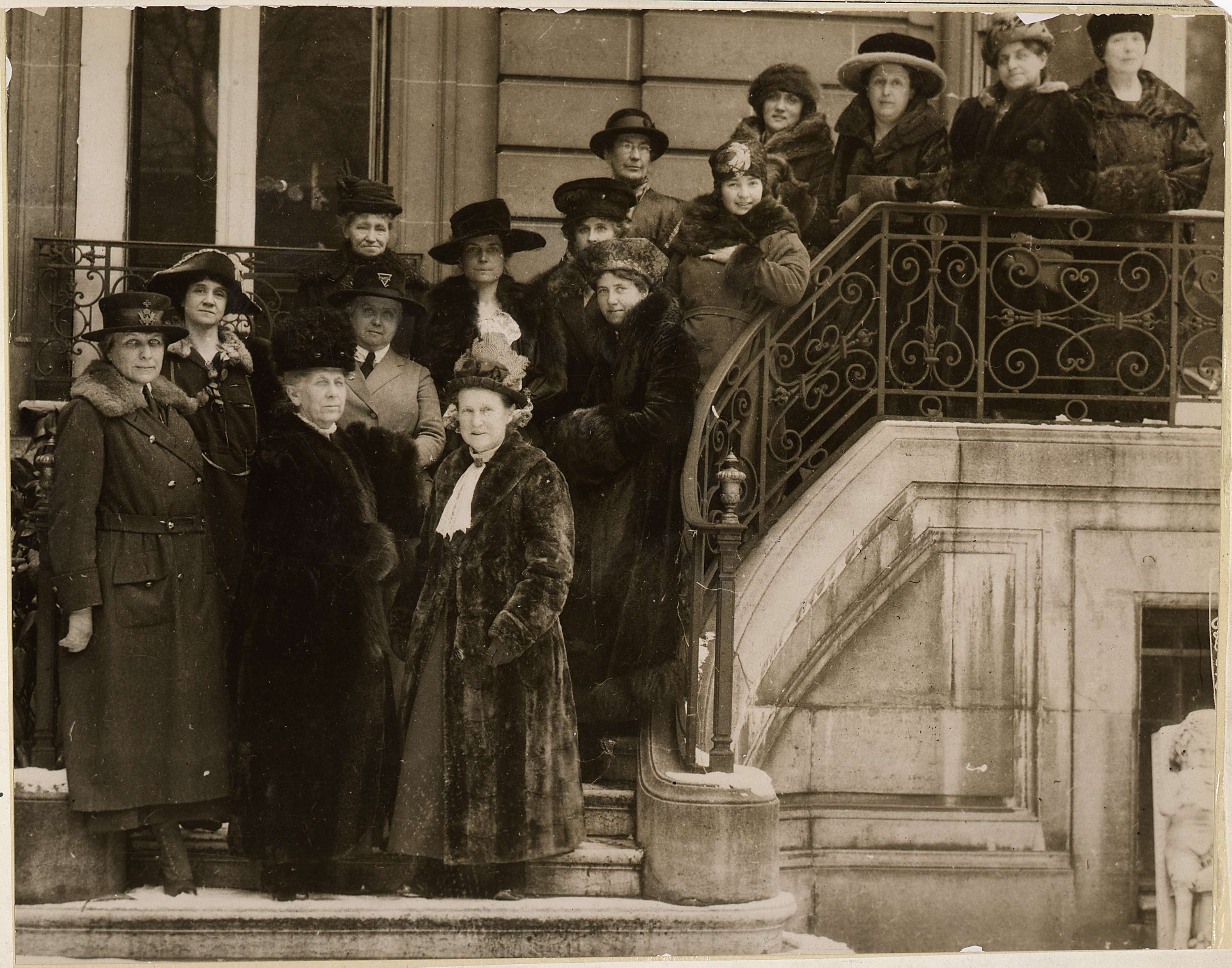
Inter-Allied Women's Conference.

Other non-national or pan-national delegations were in Paris, hoping to petition the allies on issues relating to their causes.

Group	Major People	Notes
1st Pan-African Congress	W. E. B. Du Bois; Ida Gibbs	Held in February 1919 in order to petition the allies on African issues.
Inter-Allied Women's Conference	Marguerite de Witt-Schlumberger	Convened and met from 10 February to 10 April 1919.

== Oversights ==
An oft-stated myth is that the Principality of Andorra was not invited to attend, due to an 'oversight' and that the issue of Andorra being at war was eventually resolved on September 24, 1958, when a peace treaty was signed. This claim first appeared in North American newspapers in 1958 and has been repeated since. In reality, Andorra did not officially participate in World War I. In 2014, the news outlet Ràdio i Televisió d'Andorra investigated the 1958 claim and could find no documentation of any original declaration of war. Historian Pere Cavero could only find an exchange of letters between the German consul in Marseille and the Catalan Ombudsman, where the former asks if there is a state of war with Andorra and the latter responds they could find nothing in their archive to indicate this.

== See also ==
- League for Small and Subject Nationalities
