= Hans Ainson =

Estonian politician (1862–1950)

Hans Ainson (also Hans Hainson; 27 September 1862, in Tarvastu Parish (now Viljandi Parish), Kreis Fellin – 6 June 1950, in Tarvastu Parish, Viljandi County) was an Estonian politician. He was a member of III Riigikogu, representing the Farmers' Assemblies. On 12 January 1927, he resigned and was replaced by Mart Martinson.
