= Paeküla =

Village in Estonia

Coordinates: 58°52′N 24°22′E

- Village
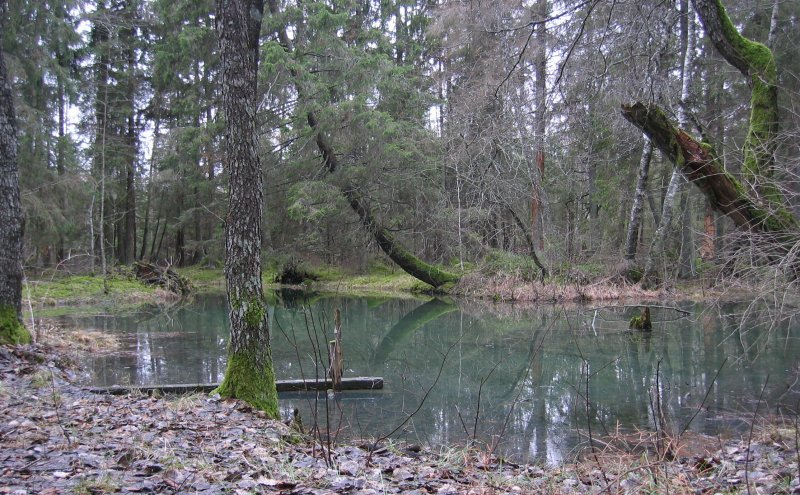
- Interactive map of Paeküla
- Country: Estonia
- County: Rapla County
- Parish: Märjamaa Parish
- Time zone: UTC+2 (EET)
  - Summer (DST): UTC+3 (EEST)

Paeküla is a village in Märjamaa Parish, Rapla County in western Estonia.

Paeküla is the birthplace of politician Mihkel Hellermaa (1891–1942).
