= Hendrik Elisson =

Estonian politician

Hendrik Elisson (23 May 1892, in Kudina Parish, Tartu kreis – ?) was an Estonian politician. He was a member of the III Riigikogu.
