= Edgar Sulg =

Estonian politician

Edgar Sulg (26 March 1891 in Kirepi Parish, Tartu County – 29 November 1970 in Montreal, Canada) was an Estonian politician. He was a member of III Riigikogu.
