= Enn Nurmiste =

Estonian politician (1894–1968)

Enn Nurmiste (born Nikolai Neuhaus; 13 July 1894 Tallinn – 3 March 1968 Tallinn) was an Estonian politician. He was a member of Estonian National Assembly (Estonian: Rahvuskogu).
