= Peeter Schütz =

Estonian politician

Peeter Schütz (born 29 June 1877 Hummuli Parish (now Tõrva Parish), Kreis Fellin) was an Estonian politician. He was a member of II Riigikogu. He was a member of the Riigikogu since 24 December 1923. He replaced Anton Palvadre.
