= Haaslava =

Village in Estonia

Coordinates: 58°20′N 26°47′E

- Village
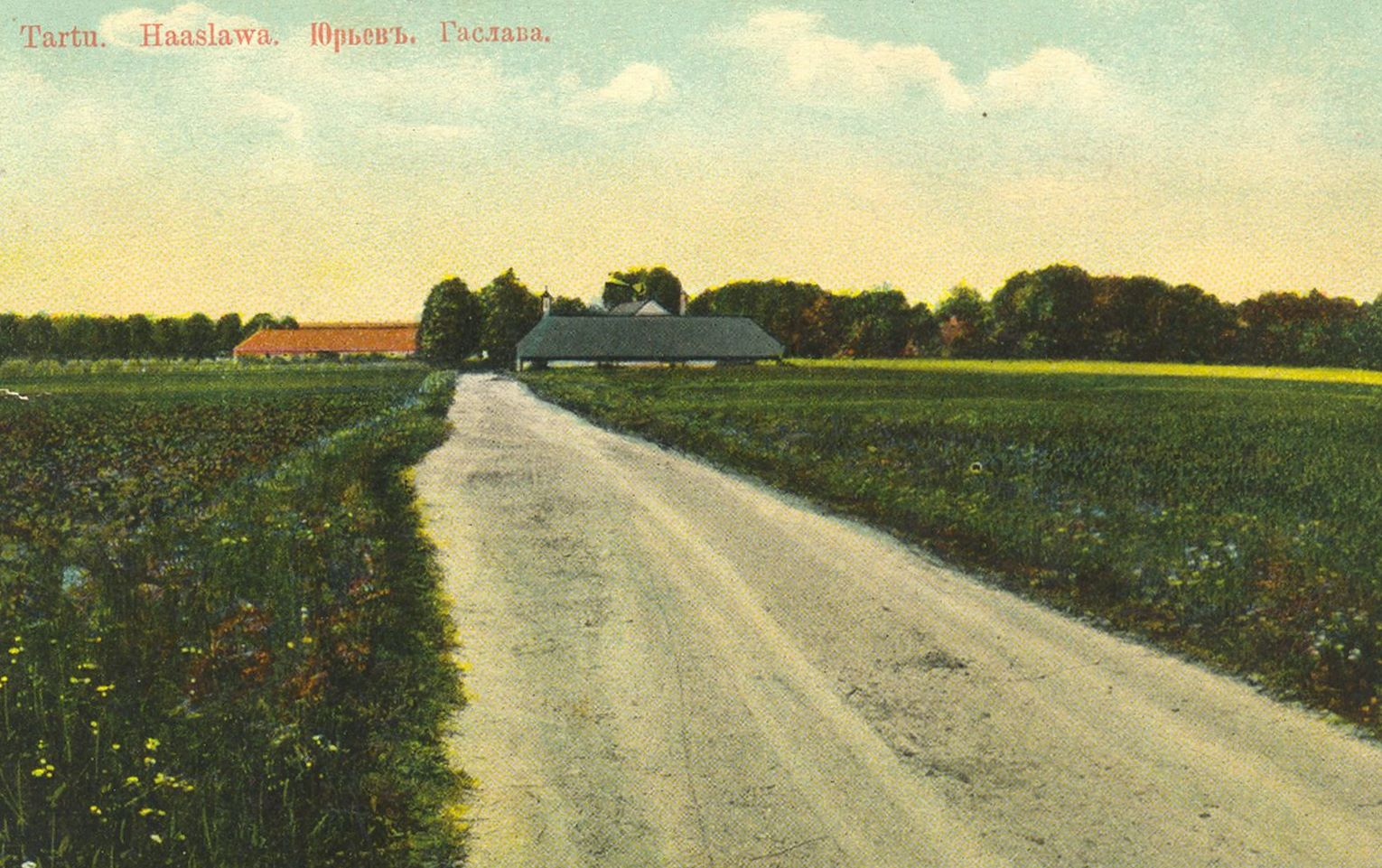
- Side buildings of Haaslava Manor.
- Interactive map of Haaslava
- Country: Estonia
- County: Tartu County
- Parish: Kastre Parish
- Time zone: UTC+2 (EET)
  - Summer (DST): UTC+3 (EEST)

Haaslava is a village in Kastre Parish, Tartu County in eastern Estonia.

Politician Aksel Herman Rüütli (1893–1976) was born and raised in Haaslava.
