= Heinrich Gutkin =

Estonian businessman and politician

- Born: 13 June 1879; Tallinn, Kreis Harrien, Governorate of Estonia, Russian Empire
- Died: 11 October 1941 (aged 62); Sverdlovsk Oblast, Russian SFSR, Soviet Union
- Occupations: trader, Estonian National Assembly member

Heinrich Gutkin (13 June 1879, in Tallinn – 11 October 1941, in Sverdlovsk Oblast) was a trader and the Estonian National Assembly member.

Heinrich Gutkin was a chairman of the Jewish Union Bank in Tallinn, a clothing store owner and a founding member of the Estonian Chamber of Commerce and Industry from 1925 to 1937. He also a chairman of the Jewish Cultural Self-Administration Office. On February 3, 1937 he was appointed to the and served as a representative of the Upper Chamber of the National Parliament. It was the first time that a Jew was appointed to the upper house.

Gutkin was arrested by Soviet security services on 14 June 1941, his property confiscated and was deported to a prison camp in the Soviet Union, where he subsequently died.
