= Jaanus Tasuja =

Estonian politician

Jaanus Tasuja (also Gustav-Eduard Lorenz; 1 March 1896 Rägevere Parish, Virumaa – 19 October 1941 Kirov, Russia) was an Estonian politician. He was a member of III Riigikogu. He was a member of the Riigikogu since 16 May 1927. He replaced Heinrich Richard Kiiver.
