= Johannes-Rudolf Norman =

Estonian politician

Johannes-Rudolf Norman (also Johannes-Rudolf Normann; 23 March 1881 – ?) was an Estonian politician. He was a member of III Riigikogu. He was a member of the Riigikogu since 4 January 1928. He replaced Karl Johannes Virma. On 23 January 1928, he resigned his position and he was replaced by Karl Kaal.
