= Johan-Oskar Rütli =

Estonian politician (1871–1949)

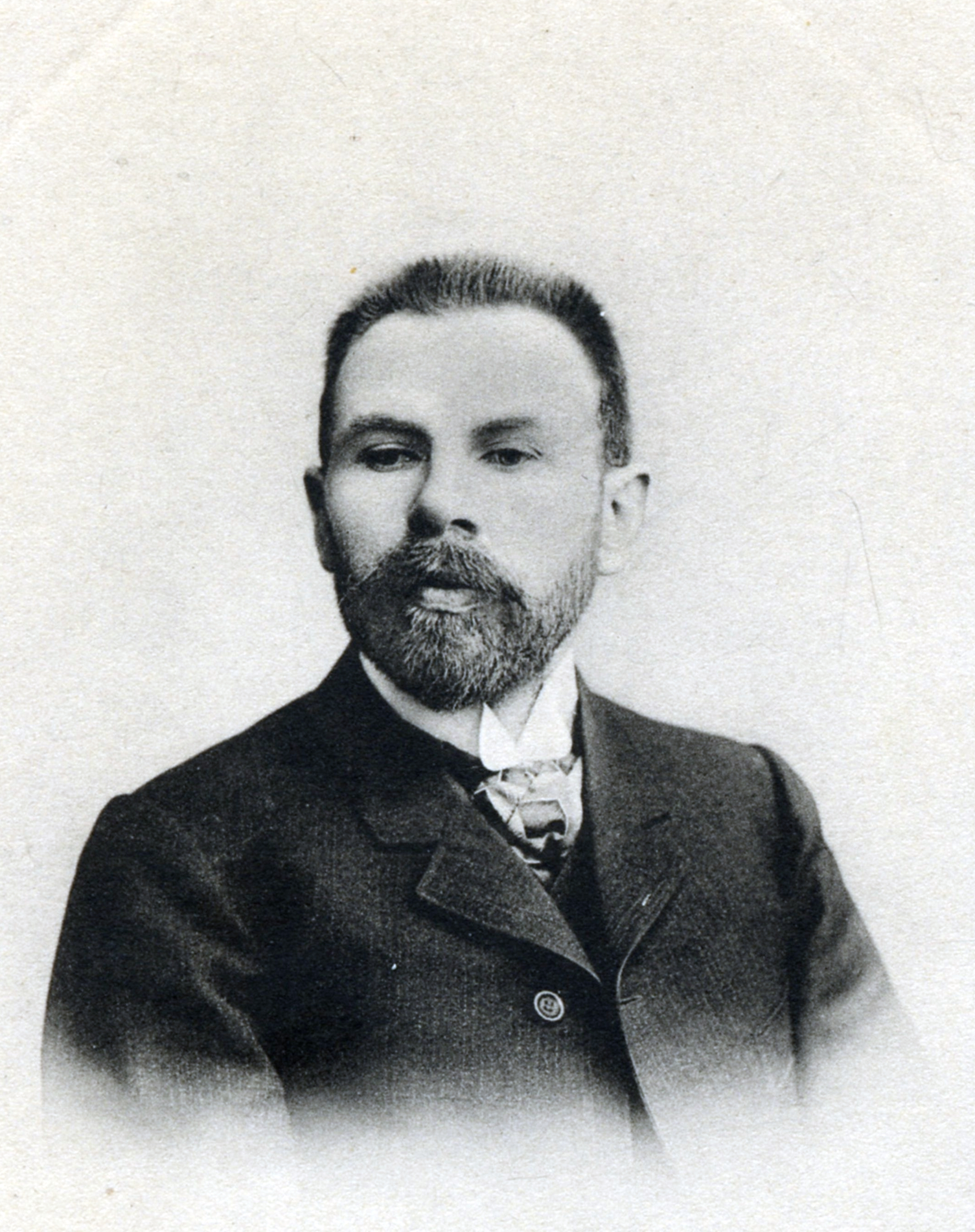
Johan-Oskar Rütli

Johan-Oskar Rütli (19 December 1871 Ahja Parish (now Põlva Parish), Kreis Dorpat – 24 July 1949 Augsburg, Germany) was an Estonian politician. He was a member of II Riigikogu. On 24 January 1924, he resigned his position and he was replaced by Juhan Sepp.
