= Jüri Marksoo =

Estonian politician

Jüri Marksoo (born Jüri Markson; 10 August 1876 Ertsma, Pärnu County – 3 October 1941 Sevurallag, Sverdlovsk Oblast) was an Estonian politician. He was a member of Estonian National Assembly (Estonian: Rahvuskogu).
