= Arnold Grimpel =

Estonian politician

Arnold Grimpel (also Arnold Krimpel; 2 April 1901 Valga – 1938 Karelian ASSR, Soviet Union) was an Estonian politician. He was a member of III Riigikogu.

On 4 December 1928, he was removed from his position and he was replaced by Mihkel Krents.
