= Aleksander Täheväli =

Estonian politician

Aleksander Täheväli (also Aleksander Sternfeld; 5 December 1888 Mäksa Parish, Tartu County - 30 January 1955 Stockholm) was an Estonian politician. He was a member of III Riigikogu.
