= Suure-Kambja =

Village in Estonia

Coordinates: 58°13′N 26°42′E

- Village
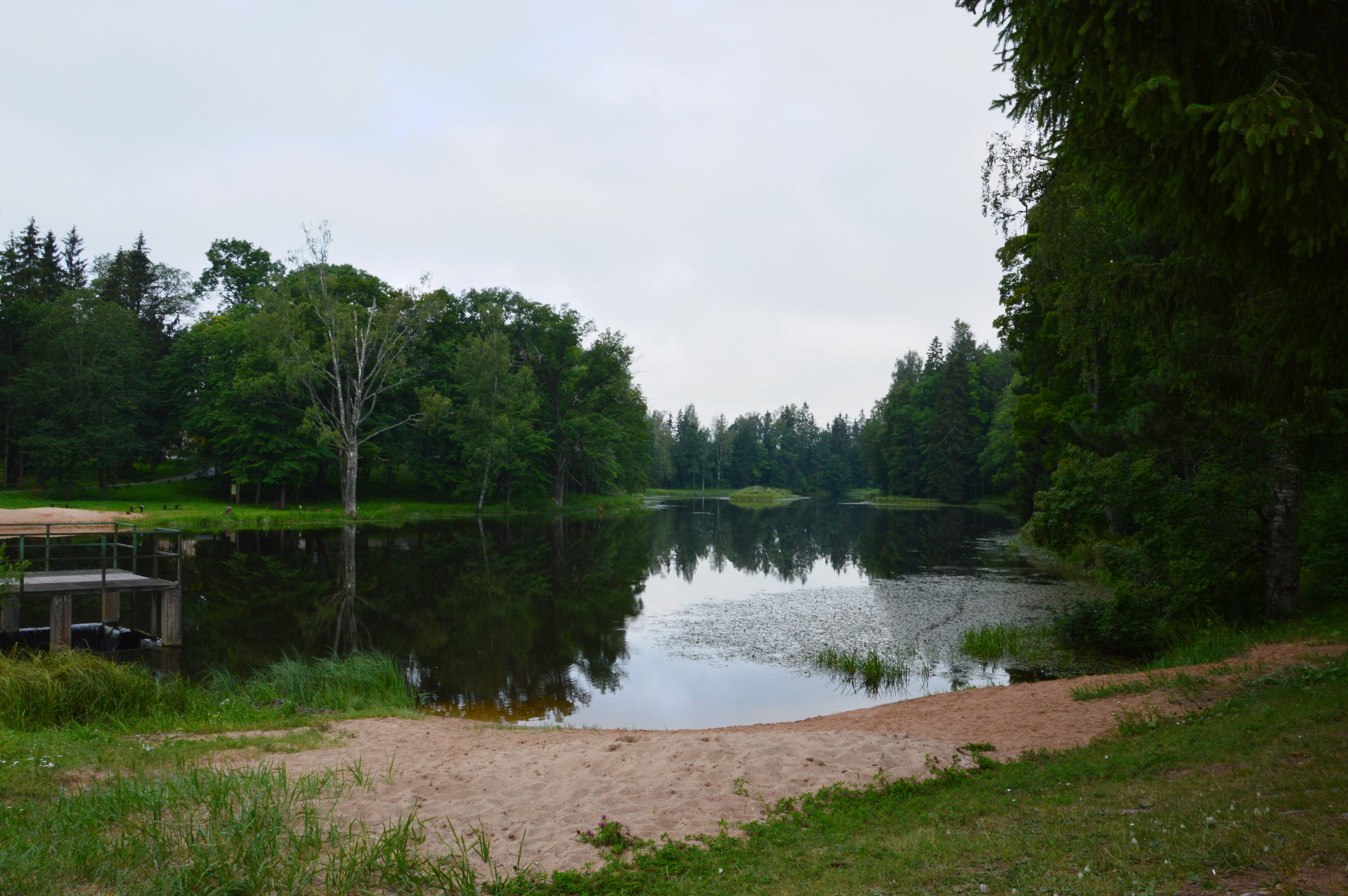
- Suure-Kambja lake
- Interactive map of Suure-Kambja
- Country: Estonia
- County: Tartu County
- Parish: Kambja Parish
- Time zone: UTC+2 (EET)
  - Summer (DST): UTC+3 (EEST)

Suure-Kambja is a village in Kambja Parish, Tartu County in eastern Estonia.

Suure-Kambja is the birthplace of Estonian politician Karl Eduard Kompus (1903–1942).
