= Karl Eduard Kompus =

Estonian politician

Karl Eduard Kompus (also Kaarel Eduard Kompus; 3 April 1903 Suure-Kambja – 25 August 1942 Sverdlovsk Oblast) was an Estonian politician. He was a member of Estonian National Assembly (Estonian: Rahvuskogu).

Kompus was arrested by Soviet authorities following the Soviet occupation of Estonia in 1940. He was executed by gunshot in Sverdlovsk Oblast in 1942.
