= Heinrich Richard Kiiver =

Estonian politician

Heinrich Richard Kiiver (13 January 1891, in Vohnja Parish (now Kadrina Parish), Virumaa – 28 April 1961, in Tallinn) was an Estonian politician. He was a member of III Riigikogu. On 16 May 1927, he resigned and was replaced by Gustv-Eduard Lorenz.
