= Johan Hansing =

Estonian lawyer

Johan Hansing (10 October 1888 Narva – 24 July 1941 Sverdlovsk Oblast) was an Estonian lawyer, stage actor, playwright, and politician. He was a member of the Estonian National Assembly (Estonian: Rahvuskogu) and elected Mayor of Narva in 1940.
