= Aleksander Kask =

Estonian politician

Aleksander Kask (29 November 1885 – 24 January 1950) was an Estonian politician. He was a member of Estonian National Assembly.

He was born in Lohusuu Municipality, Tartu County.
