= NKVD prisoner massacre in Tartu =

1941 massacre of Estonian prisoners by the Soviet NKVD in Tartu

Coordinates: 58°22′24″N 26°43′11″E

- Part of the NKVD prisoner massacres and the first Soviet occupation of the Baltic states
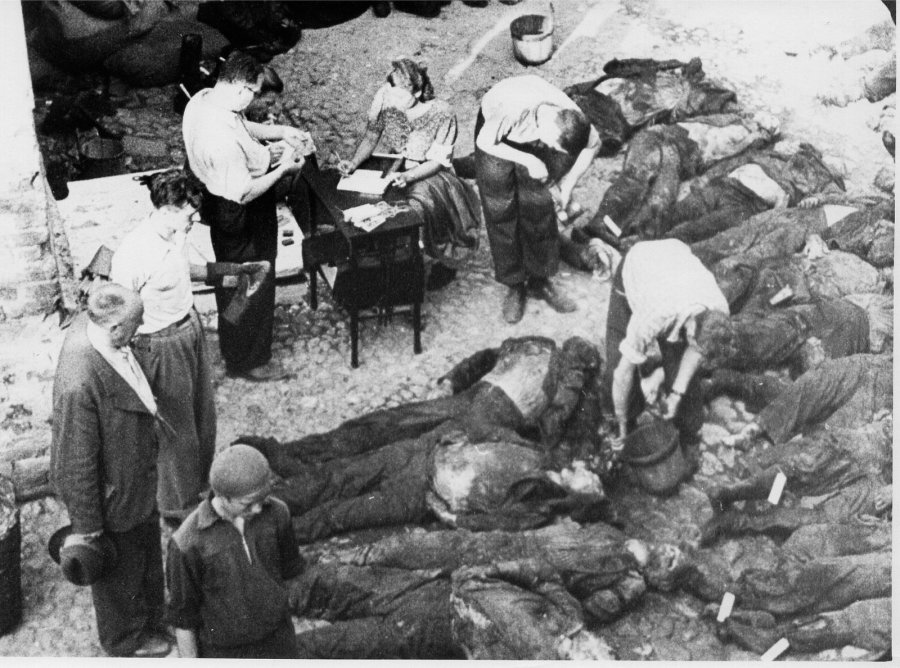
- Corpses of the massacre's victims
- Location: Tartu, Estonia
- Date: July 9, 1941 (EET)
- Target: Estonian prisoners
- Attack type: Massacre, war crime
- Deaths: 193
- Perpetrator: (Soviet Union) NKVD

The NKVD prisoner massacre in Tartu (Estonian: Tartu vangla massimõrv) was a mass execution of 193 Estonian political prisoners by the NKVD at Tartu Prison on 9 July 1941. The event was part of larger spree of mass killings carried out by Soviet authorities in Estonia and across the Baltic states during the summer of 1941.

Other Soviet mass killings carried out during the same period included the execution of approximately 90 prisoners in the NKVD mass killing in Kuressaare, as well as executions in Tallinn (including at Patarei Prison), Narva, and Lihula, among other locations across Estonia, and throughout the Baltic states, including in Riga and Liepāja in Latvia, and in Lithuania, most notably the Rainiai massacre, as well as executions in Kaunas and Pravieniškės near Kaunas.

== Events ==
In July 1940, Estonia was occupied by the Soviet Union in coordination with Nazi Germany under the terms of the Secret protocol of the Molotov–Ribbentrop Pact. The occupation was accompanied by the systematic implementation of Soviet repressive measures, including arrests, deportations, and executions carried out by the NKVD. In the context of the German advance into the Baltic region in the summer of 1941, NKVD units conducted a series of mass executions of prisoners across the occupied territories of Estonia, Latvia, and Lithuania.

At the end of June 1941, 619 prisoners were held in Tartu Prison. Although deportations to prison camps in the far areas of the Soviet Union were ongoing, continued arrests resulted in 223 detainees remaining in custody by 8 July 1941. As German forces approached Tartu, the Tartu County Committee of the Communist (Bolshevik) Party of Estonia convened to determine the disposition of these prisoners. Following a proposal by Alfred Pressman, head of the local NKVD branch, and with the approval of his deputy Pavel Afanasyev and Abronov, secretary of the Central Committee of the Party, a decision was taken to execute the remaining detainees. The corresponding order was issued on 8 July 1941, and the executions were carried out on 8–9 July.

The executions were primarily conducted in the prison sauna and its adjoining courtyard commonly referred to as St. Anthony's Courtyard. Victims were shot at close range, typically in the head. The bodies were interred in mass graves prepared within the courtyard. Two pits, approximately 2.5 metres deep, contained, respectively, the remains of 18 men and one woman, and 74 men and 19 women. A third burial site located centrally within the courtyard contained the bodies of an additional 80 men. The graves were deliberately concealed with layers of soil, timber, sheet metal, and construction debris.

In total, 193 individuals, 173 men and 20 women, were executed, youngest being a 16 year old boy and the oldest 71-year old farmer. The victims represented a broad cross-section of the local population, including workers, craftsmen, students, civil servants, members of the intelligentsia, and rural inhabitants from Tartu and its surrounding areas. Identified victims included, among others, Jüri Parijõgi, novelist and director of the Tartu Teachers’ Seminary; Aksel-Erich Vooremaa, priest of the Tartu Maarja congregation and assistant dean of the Estonian Evangelical Lutheran Church Tartu deanery; August Usai, director of the Petseri Gymnasium and a member of the Fifth Riigikogu; Ida Suvero, actress at the Vanemuine Theatre; and Eduard Nurk, a 400-metre runner, holder of Estonian national record.

== Memorial ==
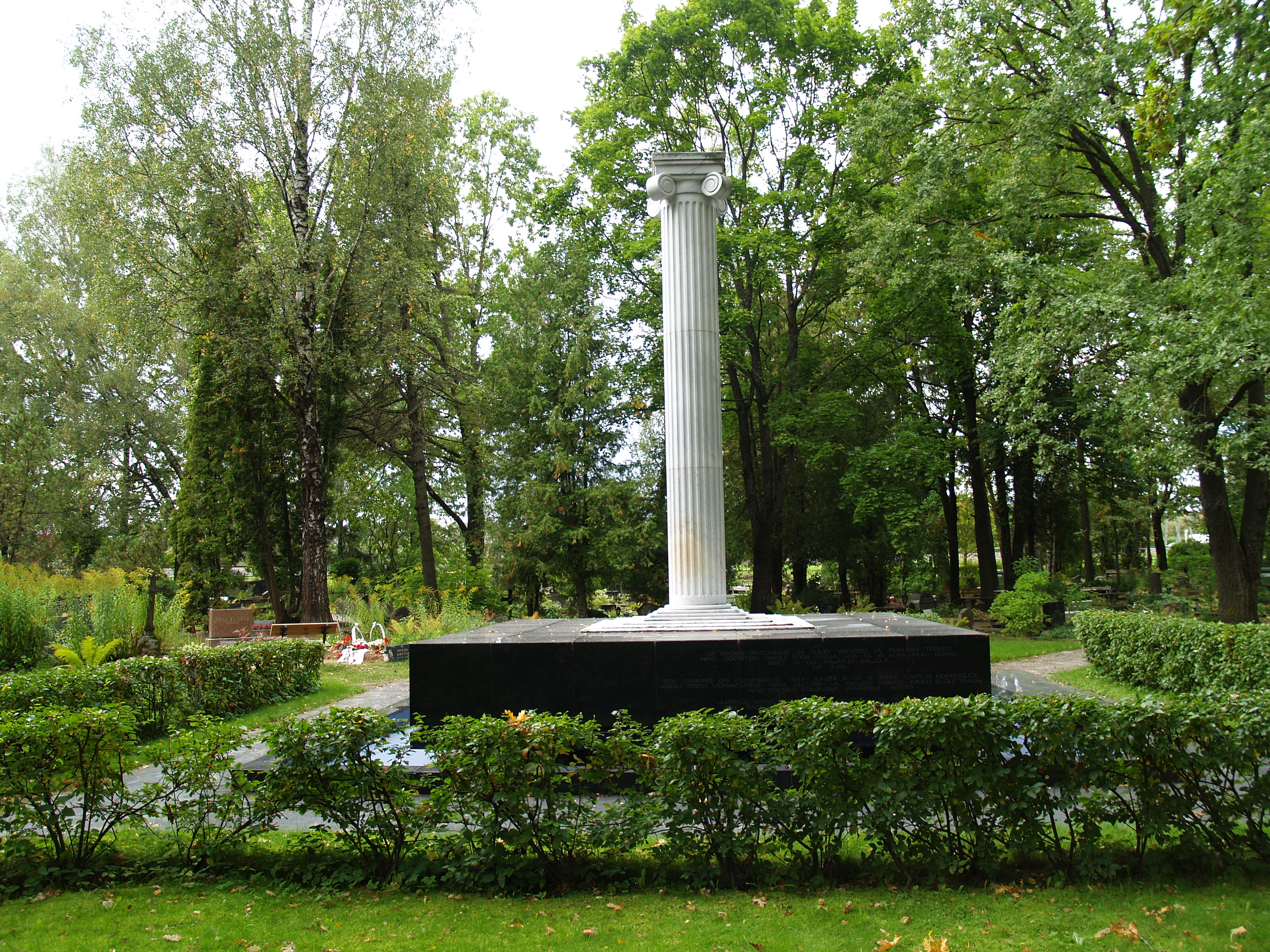
Mass grave of terror victims at Pauluse Cemetery, Tartu

Between 25 March and early May 1942, the remains were exhumed and reinterred in a collective grave at Tartu Pauluse Cemetery. A memorial monument was erected at the site in 2001, marking the sixtieth anniversary of the killings; it incorporates the national colours of Estonia and bears the names of the 150 identified victims.

== See also ==
- Tartu Credit Center Massacre
