= Oskar Silde =

Estonian politician

Oskar Silde (25 August 1900 Käina Parish, Hiiu County – 12 January 1996 Tallinn) was an Estonian politician. He was a member of Estonian National Assembly (Estonian: Rahvuskogu).
