= Jakob Saar =

Estonian politician

Jakob Saar (14 April 1886, in Pala Parish, Tartu County – 24 February 1950, in Tartu) was an Estonian politician. He was a member of III Riigikogu.
