= Hendrik Tallo =

Estonian politician

Hendrik Tallo (11 September 1893 Tali Parish, Pärnu County – 9 May 1938 Kilingi-Nõmme) was an Estonian politician. He was a member of Estonian National Assembly (Estonian: Rahvuskogu).
