= Taavet Avarmaa =

Estonian politician

Taavet Avarmaa (born David Akermann; 22 September 1900 Tahkuranna Parish (now Häädemeeste Parish), Kreis Pernau – 1 October 1982 Haapsalu) was an Estonian jurist and politician. He was a member of Estonian National Assembly (Estonian: Rahvuskogu).
