= Lembit Kolk =

Estonian politician

Lembit Kolk (born Vassil Kolk; 5 October 1907, Muhu – 13 April 2003, Toronto, Canada) was an Estonian politician. He was a member of Estonian National Assembly (Estonian: Rahvuskogu).

In 1944, during World War II and the Soviet occupation of Estonia, the Kolk family fled to Sweden, and Kolk was later a member of the board of the Central Council of Estonians in Toronto, Canada.
