= Nikita Semjonov =

Estonian politician

Nikita Semjonov (22 October 1887 Irboska Parish, Pskov Governorate – ?) was an Estonian politician. He was a member of III Riigikogu. As of 1 October 1928, he was counted as missing from Riigikogu, and therefore he was replaced by Jakob Homin.
