= Hellmuth Weiss =

Baltic-German historian, politician, and activist

Hellmuth Weiss (23 October 1900 Tallinn – 10 April 1992 Marburg, Germany) was a Baltic-German historian and politician, and an activist of the German minority in Estonia. He was a member of the Estonian National Assembly (Estonian: Rahvuskogu).
