= Theodor Maurer =

Estonian politician

Theodor Maurer (1 January 1889 Halinga Parish (now Põhja-Pärnumaa Parish), Kreis Pernau – ?) was an Estonian politician. He was a member of the III Riigikogu, representing the Estonian Workers' Party. He was a member of the Riigikogu since 7 July 1926. He replaced Paul Abramson.
