= Karl Ferdinand Karlson =

Estonian politician

Karl-Ferdinand Karlson (16 March 1875, Laeva Parish, Tartu County – 14 November 1941, Verkhoturye, Sverdlovsk Oblast) was an Estonian lawyer and politician. He was a member of Estonian National Assembly (Estonian: Rahvuskogu).

Karlson studied at the Hugo Treffner Gymnasium in Tartu before taking his final exams at the Riga Alexander Boys Gymnasium. He graduated from the Faculty of Law of the University of Tartu in 1899. In the last year of university, he joined the cycling club Taara. After relocating to Tallinn, in 1901 he was elected chairman (first chairman) of Kalev Cyclists' Society; from 1902 until 1906 he managed the society's activities. He was elected as a member of the Tallinn City Council in 1904. Between 1905 and 1914, he gained recognition as a lyricist and playwright. During the Estonian War of Independence, he was the chairman of the Estonian Military District Court for the Ministry of Defence. From 1920 he worked as a lawyer in Tartu and was a founding member and chairman of the Tartu Society of Legal Scholars. Following the Soviet occupation of Estonia in 1940 during World War II, Karlson was arrested by the NKVD and died while incarcerated at Sosva Prison Camp in Sverdlovsk Oblast, Russian Soviet Federative Socialist Republic.
