= Johannes-Leopold Antik =

Estonian politician (1885–1959)

Johannes-Leopold Antik (13 January 1885 in Ulila Parish (now Elva Parish), Kreis Dorpat – 1959 in Omsk Oblast, Russia) was an Estonian politician. He was a member of IV Riigikogu. He was a member of the Riigikogu since 15 October 1929. He replaced Jüri Ottas. On 30 September 1930, he resigned his position and he was replaced by Jüri Uluots.
