= Aksel Herman Rüütli =

Estonian politician

Aksel Herman Rüütli (16 July 1893 – 22 February 1976) was an Estonian politician born in Haaslava and representing the Estonian Socialist Workers' Party. He was a member of III Riigikogu. On 15 October 1926, he resigned his position and he was replaced by Mart Adamson.
