= Karl Theodor Saarmann =

Estonian politician

Karl Theodor Saarmann (19 January 1893 Tallinn – 3 April 1948 Tallinn) was an Estonian judge, jurist and politician. He was a member of Estonian National Assembly (Estonian: Rahvuskogu).
