= Verner Liik =

Estonian politician

Verner Liik (26 April 1897 – 19 November 1958) was an Estonian politician. Liik was born in Haldi, on the island of Hiiumaa. He was a member of III Riigikogu. On 16 June 1926, he resigned his position and he was replaced by Benedikt Oskar Oja. He died in Tallinn.
