= Artur-Aleksander Linari =

Estonian politician, industrialist, and engineer

Artur-Aleksander Linari (also Artur-Aleksander Linholm; 12 January 1903 Tallinn – 25 October 1983 Toronto) was an Estonian politician, industrialist, mineralogist, mining engineer and professor. He was a member of Estonian National Assembly (Estonian: Rahvuskogu).
