= August Luik =

Estonian politician (1899–1930)

August Luik (22 January 1899 Pajusi Parish (now Põltsamaa Parish), Kreis Fellin – 1930 Soviet Union) was an Estonian politician. He was a member of the III Riigikogu, representing the Estonian Workers' Party. He was a member of the Riigikogu since 21 June 1926. He replaced Rosalie Verner. On 7 May 1928, he resigned his position and he was replaced by Konstantin Veiss.
