= Konrad Arras =

Estonian politician (1876–1930)

Konrad Arras (14 July 1876 Erastvere Parish (now Kanepi Parish), Kreis Werro – 30 October 1930 Tartu) was an Estonian politician. He was a member of the II and III Riigikogu, representing the Farmers' Assemblies.
