= Valter Krimm =

Estonian politician

- Born: December 21, 1902; Undla Parish, Virumaa
- Disappeared: August 1944 (aged 41); Sinimäed Hills, Estonia (Battle of the Blue Hills)
- Occupation: Politician

Valter Krimm (21 December 1902 in Undla Parish, Virumaa – 1944) was an Estonian politician. He was a member of Estonian National Assembly (Estonian: Rahvuskogu).

Krimm graduated from the Faculty of Law of the University of Tartu in 1926 and was a member of the Estonian Students' Association. From 1927 to 1937, he was a notary in Lihula and from 1937 in Rakvere. Krimm was a member of the Estonian Defence League's Lääne County Brigade. Following the German occupation of Estonia during World War II, Krimm served in the German military. He went missing in action during the Battle of the Blue Hills in August 1944 and is presumed to have been killed in action.
