= Peeter Kõpp =

Estonian politician

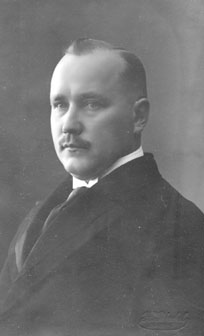
Peeter Kõpp

Peeter Kõpp (3 April 1888 in Kärstna Parish, Viljandi County – 20 August 1960 in Chicago) was an Estonian agronomist, politician and professor. He was a member of Estonian National Assembly (Estonian: Rahvuskogu).
