= Ludvig Ojaveski =

Estonian politician (1892–1940)

Ludvig Ojaveski (born Ludvig Mühlbach; 26 April 1892 Vihasoo – 6 August 1940 Tallinn) was an Estonian politician. He was a member of Estonian National Assembly (Estonian: Rahvuskogu).
