= Mihkel Krents =

Estonian politician

Mihkel Krents (29 May 1881 Pärsamaa Parish (now Saaremaa Parish), Kreis Ösel – 8 May 1935 Järve Parish, Virumaa) was an Estonian politician. He was a member of III Riigikogu, representing the Estonian Workers' Party. He was a member of the Riigikogu since 4 December 1928. He replaced Arnold Grimpel.
