= Voldemar Korjus =

Estonian politician

Voldemar Korjus (25 March 1875 Haapsalu – 28 June 1961 New York, USA) was an Estonian politician. He was a member of III Riigikogu. He was a member of the Riigikogu since 4 December 1928. He replaced Jakob Westholm.
