= Konstantin Veiss =

Estonian politician (1896–1962)

Konstantin Veiss (8 March 1896, Tallinn – December 1962) was an Estonian politician. He was a member of III Riigikogu, representing the Estonian Workers' Party. He was a member of the Riigikogu since 7 May 1928. He replaced August Luik.
