= Rosalie Verner =

Estonian politician

Rosalie Verner (16 December 1880 Avanduse Parish (now Väike-Maarja Parish), Kreis Wierland – ?) was an Estonian politician. She was a member of III Riigikogu. On 21 May 1926, she resigned her position and she was replaced by August Luik.
