= Mart Adamson =

Estonian politician

Mart Adamson (9 November 1892 in Viiratsi – 20 January 1975) was an Estonian politician. He was a member of III and IV Riigikogu, representing the Estonian Socialist Workers' Party. He became a member of the Riigikogu on 15 October 1926. He replaced Aksel Herman Rüütli.
