= Aleksander Arak =

Estonian politician, agronomist, and pedagogue

Aleksander Arak (1 February 1883 in Helme Parish (now Tõrva Parish), Kreis Fellin – 2 December 1969) was an Estonian politician, agronomist and pedagogue. He was a member of Estonian National Assembly (Estonian: Rahvuskogu).
