= Alma Jeets =

Estonian politician (1896–1979)

Alma Jeets (7 November 1896 Viljandi – 9 February 1979) was an Estonian politician. She was a member of Estonian National Assembly (Estonian: Rahvuskogu).

Jeets was arrested by the NKVD in 1944 and sentenced to five years in a prison camp in Siberia, where she survived due to medical knowledge acquired in the Women's Home Guard (Naiskodukaitse, or NKK), which she had been a member since 1928. In 1949, she was permitted to return to Estonia and initially lived in Riisipere. Later, with her family, she settled in Tallinn.
