= Jakob Kristelstein =

Estonian politician

Jakob Kristelstein (16 May 1889 Udriku – 31 May 1968 Tallinn) was an Estonian politician. He was a member of Estonian National Assembly (Estonian: Rahvuskogu).
