= Aleksander Kaal =

Estonian politician

Aleksander Kaal (also Sander Kaal; 25 March 1876 Pöide Parish, Kreis Ösel – 5 December 1941 Irkutsk, Russia) was an Estonian politician. He was a member of III Riigikogu. On 29 September 1926, he resigned his position and he was replaced by Otto Pukk.
