= Karl Kaal =

Estonian politician (1883–1942)

Karl Kaal (30 September 1883 Võisiku Parish, Viljandi County – 24 April 1942) was an Estonian politician. He became a member of the 3rd Riigikogu on 23 January 1928, replacing Johannes-Rudolf Norman.
