= Toomas Takjas =

Estonian politician

Toomas Takjas (also Toomas Takkias; 6 March 1900 Kalvi Parish, Virumaa – 22 September 1987 Rakvere) was an Estonian agronomist and politician. He was a member of Estonian National Assembly (Estonian: Rahvuskogu).
