= Oskar Koplus =

Estonian politician

Oskar Koplus (24 April 1909 Tartu – 17 November 1975 Tartu) was an Estonian politician and a member of the Estonian National Assembly (Estonian: Rahvuskogu).
