= Alfred Mäeloog =

Estonian politician

Alfred Mäeloog (8 September 1885, in Tartu – 6 January 1955, in Sydney) was an Estonian politician. He was a member of Estonian National Assembly (Estonian: Rahvuskogu).
