= Jakob Kalju =

Estonian politician

Jakob Kalju (29 March 1903 Järvesuu Parish (now Setomaa Parish), Petserimaa – 20 April 1942 Sevurallag, Sverdlovsk Oblast) was an Estonian politician. He was a member of Estonian National Assembly (Estonian: Rahvuskogu).
