= Johann Post =

Estonian politician

Johann Post (11 September 1902 Sauga Parish, Pärnu County – 1 February 1983 Tõstamaa Selsoviet, Pärnu District) was an Estonian politician. He was a member of Estonian National Assembly (Estonian: Rahvuskogu).
