= Willem Vessart =

Estonian politician

Willem Vessart (22 October 1886 Kolga Parish, Harju County – 22 August 1944 Paide Parish, Järva County) was an Estonian politician. He was a member of III Riigikogu.
