= Johannes Paabusk =

Estonian politician

Johannes Paabusk (also Johannes Pabusk; 9 July 1891 in Kureküla – ?) was an Estonian politician. He was a member of Estonian National Assembly (Estonian: Rahvuskogu). He was arrested by Soviet authorities on 14 November 1945. His fate is unclear, but is assumed to have died in a gulag.
