= Karl Schlossmann =

Estonian microbiologist

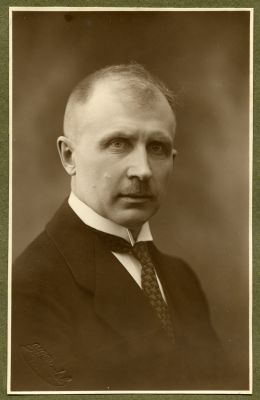
Karl Schlossmann

Karl Richard Benjamin Schlossmann (19 February 1885 Puurmani Parish (now Põltsamaa Parish, Kreis Dorpat – 17 December 1969 Stockholm) was an Estonian microbiologist. He was a member of Estonian National Assembly (Estonian: Rahvuskogu).
