= Aleksander-Rudolf Toomel =

Estonian politician

Aleksander-Rudolf Toomel (14 June 1888 Jõhvi Parish, Virumaa – 17 November 1941 Kirov, Russia) was an Estonian politician. He was a member of III Riigikogu.
