= Jakob Homin =

Estonian politician

Jakob Homin (born 27 October 1898 Senno Parish, Pskov Governorate) was an Estonian politician. He was a member of III Riigikogu. He was a member of the Riigikogu since 1 October 1928. He replaced Nikita Semjonov.
