= Mihkel-Voldemar Vellema =

Estonian politician

Mihkel-Voldemar Vellema (also Mihkel-Voldemar Velberg; 4 February 1889 Pada Parish, Virumaa – 6 April 1948 Tartu) was an Estonian politician. He was a member of Estonian National Assembly (Estonian: Rahvuskogu).
