= Priit Suve =

Estonian politician

Priit Suve (born Friedrich Johann Zube; 31 March 1901 Uulu Parish, Pärnu County – 20 April 1942 Sevurallag, Sverdlovsk Oblast) was an Estonian lawyer and politician. He was a member of Estonian National Assembly (Estonian: Rahvuskogu) and the Mayor of Pärnu from 1939 until 1940.
