= Märt Martinson =

Estonian politician (1890–1948)

Märt Martinson (also Mart Martinson; 8 September 1890 Puiatu Parish (now Viljandi Parish), Kreis Fellin – 9 March 1948 Viljandi) was an Estonian politician. He was a member of II, III, IV and V Riigikogu.
