= Mihkel Rõuk =

Estonian politician

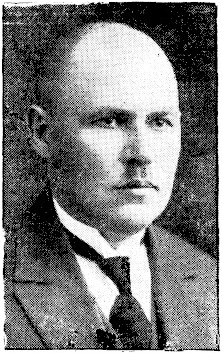

Mihkel Rõuk (5 September 1891, in Kabala Parish, Kreis Fellin – 25 September 1941, in Sverdlovsk Oblast) was an Estonian politician. He was a member of Estonian National Assembly (Estonian: Rahvuskogu).

Following the Soviet occupation of Estonia in 1940, Rõuk was arrested by the NKVD on 14 June 1941 in Türi. He died during interrogation in prison custody in the gulag camp system in Sverdlovsk Oblast, Russian Soviet Federative Socialist Republic on 25 September 1942.
