= Eduard Krüger (politician) =

Estonian politician

Eduard Krüger (22 January 1885 – ?) was an Estonian politician from Vohnja in Kadrina Parish, Lääne-Viru County, Estonia. He was a member of III Riigikogu. On 22 June 1926, he resigned his position and he was replaced by Carl Schilling.
