= August Usai =

Estonian educator and politician

August Usai (4 December 1880 Lohusuu Parish, Tartu County – 7 or 8 July 1941 Tartu) was an Estonian educator and politician. He was a member of III Riigikogu.

Following the Soviet occupation and annexation of Estonia during World War II, Usai was arrested on 27 June 1941 by the NKVD and convicted under § 58-4, 58-10 of the Russian SFNV Criminal Code (anti-Soviet agitation) and killed as a victim of the NKVD prisoner massacre in Tartu on 8 July 1941 in Tartu Prison.
