= Oskar Karl Johann Liigand =

Estonian journalist and politician

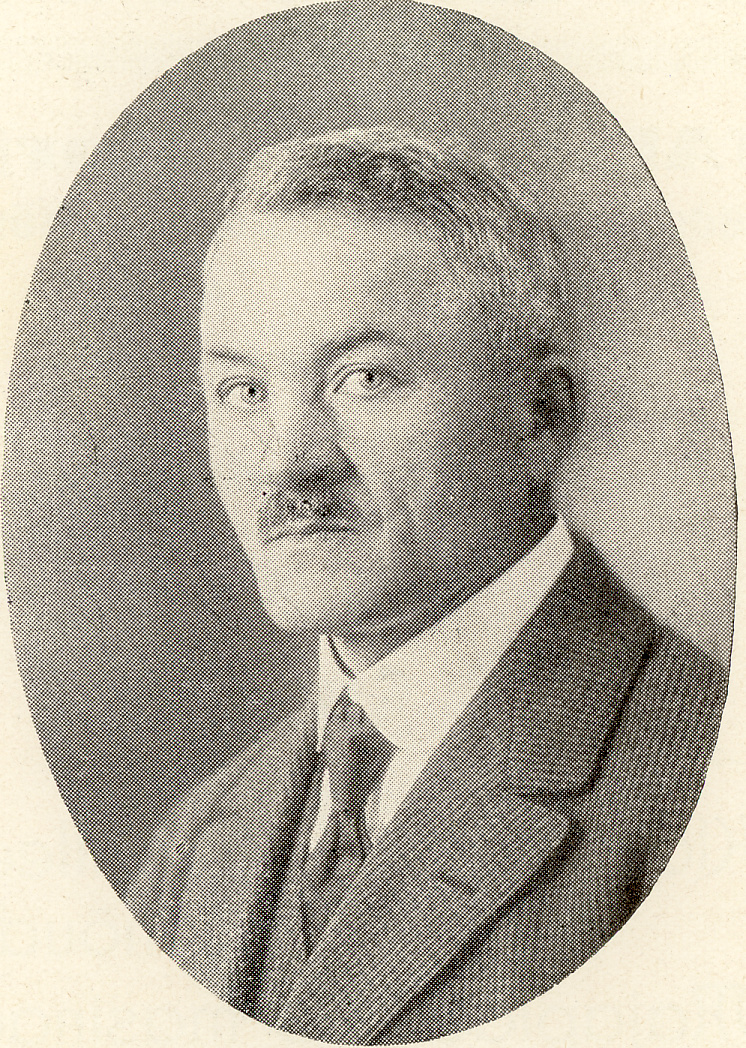
Oskar Karl Johann Liigand

Oskar Karl Johann Liigand (24 May 1874 Karksi Parish (now Mulgi Parish), Kreis Pernau – 20 November 1940 Tõdva Parish, Harju County) was an Estonian journalist and politician. He was a member of the I, II, III and IV Riigikogu.

1926-1929 he was First Assistant Secretary of III Riigikogu.
