= Mihkel Hellermaa =

Estonian politician

Mihkel Hellermaa (also Mihkel Hellerma, born Mihkel Hellmann; 28 October 1891 – 28 April 1942) was an Estonian politician, representing the Estonian Labour Party. He was a member of III Riigikogu. He was a member of the Riigikogu since 1 October 1928. He replaced Benedikt Oskar Oja.

Hellermaa was born in He was born in Paeküla. Following the Soviet occupation of Estonia in 1940, Hellermaa was arrested by Soviet authorities with his wife Elfriede "Ella" Hellermaa (née Uustallo) and children Paul, Heino, Erik, and Silvi and deported to Sevurallag, Sverdlovsk Oblast in the Russian Soviet Federative Socialist Republic as part of the mass June deportation. Their youngest child, Silvi, died in the camp system in 1941, aged four. Ella died in the gulag on 12 February 1942. Hellermaa was executed by gunshot on 18 April 1942. Their remaining children were released from the camp system in 1947.
