= August Tamman =

Estonian politician

August Tamman (also August Tammann; 17 December 1893 Suure-Kõpu Parish, Viljandi County – 27 July 1934 Tallinn) was an Estonian politician. He was a member of III Riigikogu. He was a member of the Riigikogu since 22 April 1927. He replaced Otto August Strandman. He was also the Secretary of III Riigikogu.
