= Aleksander Veiler =

Estonian politician (1887–1950)

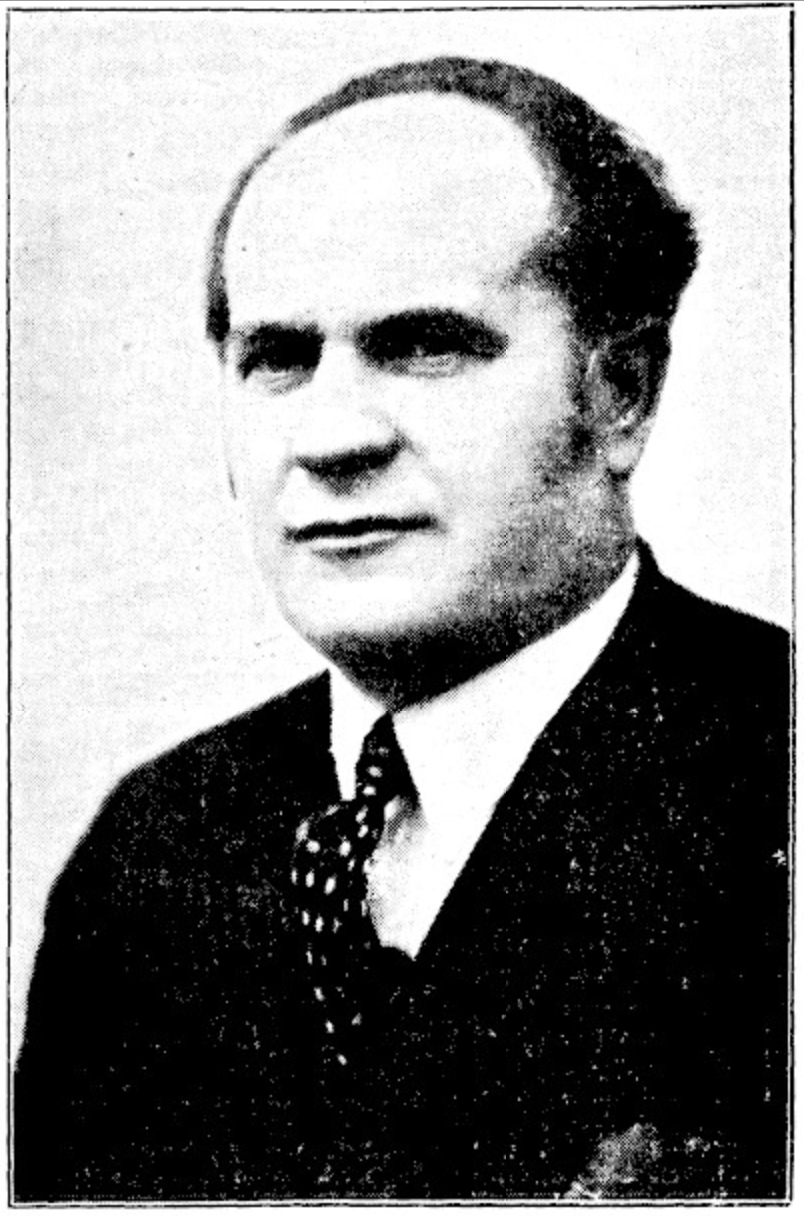
Veiler in 1937

Aleksander Veiler (16 March 1887 Aleksandri Parish (now Kose Parish), Harrien County – 17 October 1950 Toronto, Canada) was an Estonian politician. He was a member of I and III Riigikogu, representing the Estonian Labour Party.

In 1917 he was a member of Estonian Provincial Assembly.
