= Eduard Krüger (architect) =

German architect

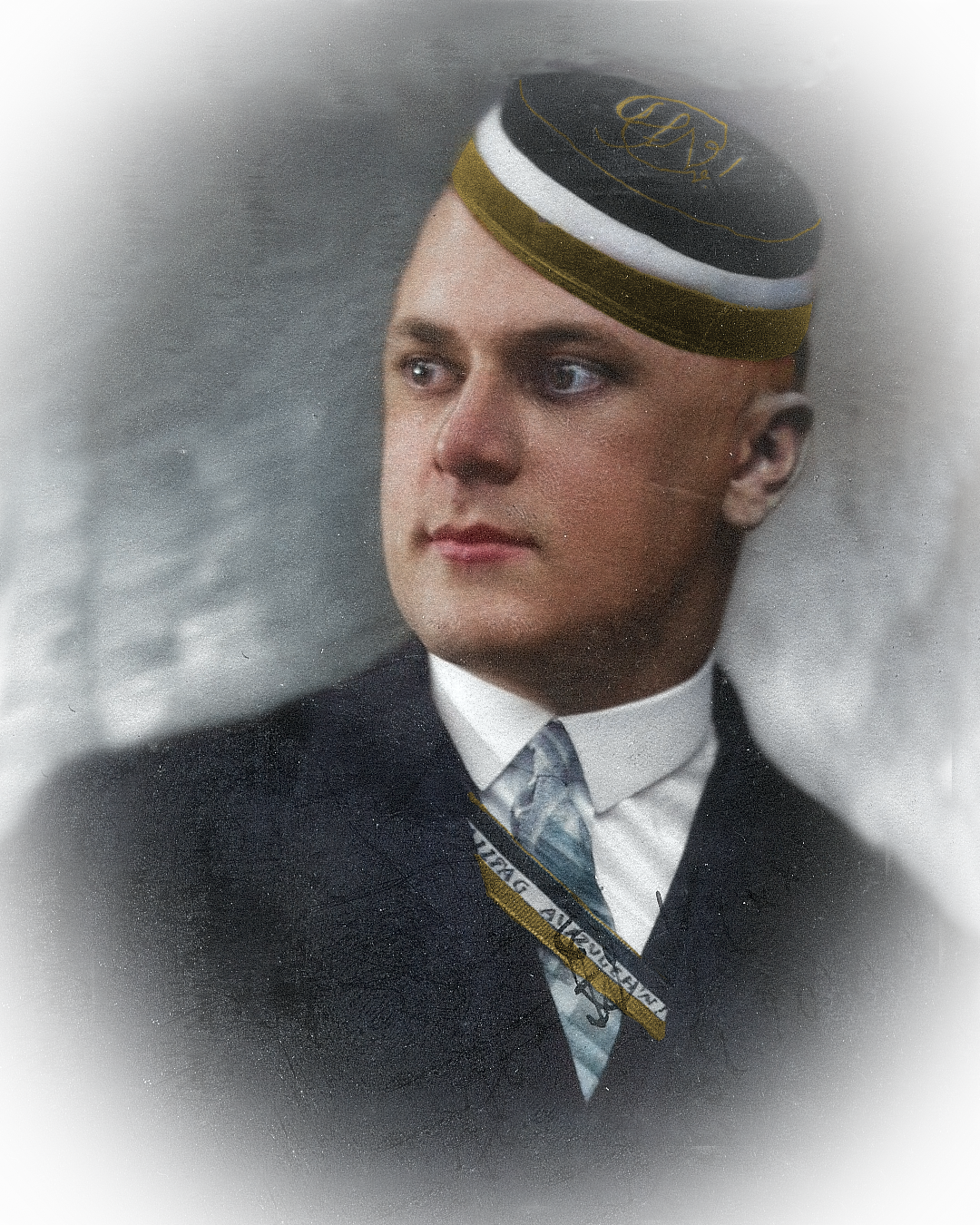
- Born: 17 March 1907; Calw, Germany
- Died: 30 March 1977 (aged 70); Schwäbisch Hall, Germany
- Occupation: Architect

Eduard Krüger (25 July 1901 – 27 June 1967) was a German architect. His work was part of the architecture event in the art competition at the 1936 Summer Olympics.

== Biography ==
Eduard Krüger was born in 1901 in the Black Forest. He had an older brother who was killed in the First World War. Since his father had already died before his birth, his mother, originally from Schwäbisch Hall, raised the children alone and worked, among other things, as a seamstress. Krüger studied architecture in Stuttgart from 1920 to 1926. Among his teachers were Paul Bonatz, Heinz Wetzel and Paul Schmitthenner.

In 1925/26 he worked in the architectural office of Bonatz, and in 1926 he passed the diploma examination. Already the following year he maintained his own architectural office in Stuttgart and received his doctorate in 1928 on the building history of the collegiate church in Herrenberg. At the beginning of his studies he became a member of the Christian student fraternity Stuttgart Wingolf. He also designed its fraternity house, which was built in 1929. Later he also became a member of both Tübingen Wingolf fraternities.

In 1937 he married Lilo Rath from Wildbad. The marriage produced a son, Rainer, who later became a high school teacher. Between 1938 and 1947, Krüger acted as deputy to Paul Bonatz at the TH Stuttgart, being one of his master students. Like Bonatz, he represented a rather conservative architectural attitude. Many of his buildings were in the spirit of homeland protection architecture. An exception is the 1929 fraternity house of the Stuttgart Wingolf built on the Diemershalde. Flat roof, ribbon windows, a roof terrace (unfortunately later converted into living space), as well as a beveled southwest corner with panoramic windows classify the building as a prime example of New Building. With the 1937 new building of the district savings bank in Wangen, for example, Krüger oriented himself on local models such as the Mohren-Post inn from 1540, whose stepped gable he repeated. As an architectural historian, he dealt intensively with the structural conditions of the surrounding area, as shown by his 1953 construction of the district savings bank in Rottenburg am Neckar. The building, not classified as a historical monument, which blended seamlessly into the image of the historic market square, has since been demolished and replaced by a new building.

In 1946 Krüger moved to Schwäbisch Hall, as his apartment and office in Stuttgart had been destroyed. From 1948 to 1951 he worked as a city planner in Schwäbisch Hall. In the 1960s he directed the renovation of the former Benedictine monastery Großcomburg. In addition to his work as an architect, he conducted numerous archaeological excavations.

On 27 July 1967, Eduard Krüger died, probably as a result of a stroke, at the age of 65. Today, a panorama path in the Schwäbisch Hall district of Hagenbach commemorates the architect.
