= Mihail Kurtschinski =

Estonian politician

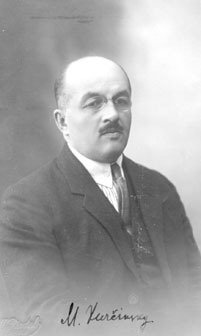
Mihail Kurtschinski

Mihail Kurtschinski (12 October 1876 Kaluga Governorate, Russia – 12 June 1939 Tartu) was an Estonian politician. He was a member of III Riigikogu.
