= Karl-Ferdinand Kornel =

Estonian politician (1882–1953)

Karl-Ferdinand Kornel (25 August 1882 Tsooru, Kreis Werro – 19 September 1953 Irkutsk Oblast, Russia) was an Estonian jurist, journalist, diplomat and politician. He was a member of the II and III Riigikogu.

Kornel began his civil service as a diplomat at the Estonian Embassy in Latvia in 1919.

From 1926 until 1927, he was Minister of Commerce and Industry.

On 28 November 1945, Kornel was arrested by the Soviet authorities and was sentenced on 10 April 1946 to ten years in prison. He died in custody on 19 September 1953 in the gulag camp system in Irkutsk Oblast.
