= Mikk =

Male given name

- Gender: Male
- Language: Estonian
- Name day: 29 September

Origin
- Region of origin: Estonia

Other names
- Related names: Nigul

Mikk is an Estonian masculine given name, a version of Nicholas.

People named Mikk include:

- Jüri-Mikk Udam, Estonian rower
- Mikk-Mihkel Arro (born 1984), decathlete
- Mikk Jürjens (born 1987), actor, singer and TV presenter
- Mikk Jurkatamm (born 2000), basketball player
- Mikk Mikiver (1937–2006), actor and theater director
- Mikk Murdvee (born 1980), Estonian-Finnish conductor and violinist
- Mikk Pahapill (born 1983), decathlete
- Mikk Pinnonen (born 1991), handballer
- Mikk Reintam (born 1990), football player
- Mikk Sarv (1951–2018), folklorist, regilaul (runic-song) singer, biologist, educator and composer

== See also ==
- Arne Mikk (born 1934), Estonian stage director and theatre manager
- Angelika Mikk (born 1973), Estonian opera singer and actress
- Mikko
- Miki, Azerbaijan, village and municipality in the Astara Rayon of Azerbaijan, also known as Mikk.
