= Haldi, Estonia =

Village in Estonia

Haldi
- Village
- Location within Estonia
- Coordinates: 58°48′N 22°30′E
- Country: Estonia
- County: Hiiu County
- Parish: Hiiumaa Parish
- Time zone: UTC+2 (EET)
  - Summer (DST): UTC+3 (EEST)

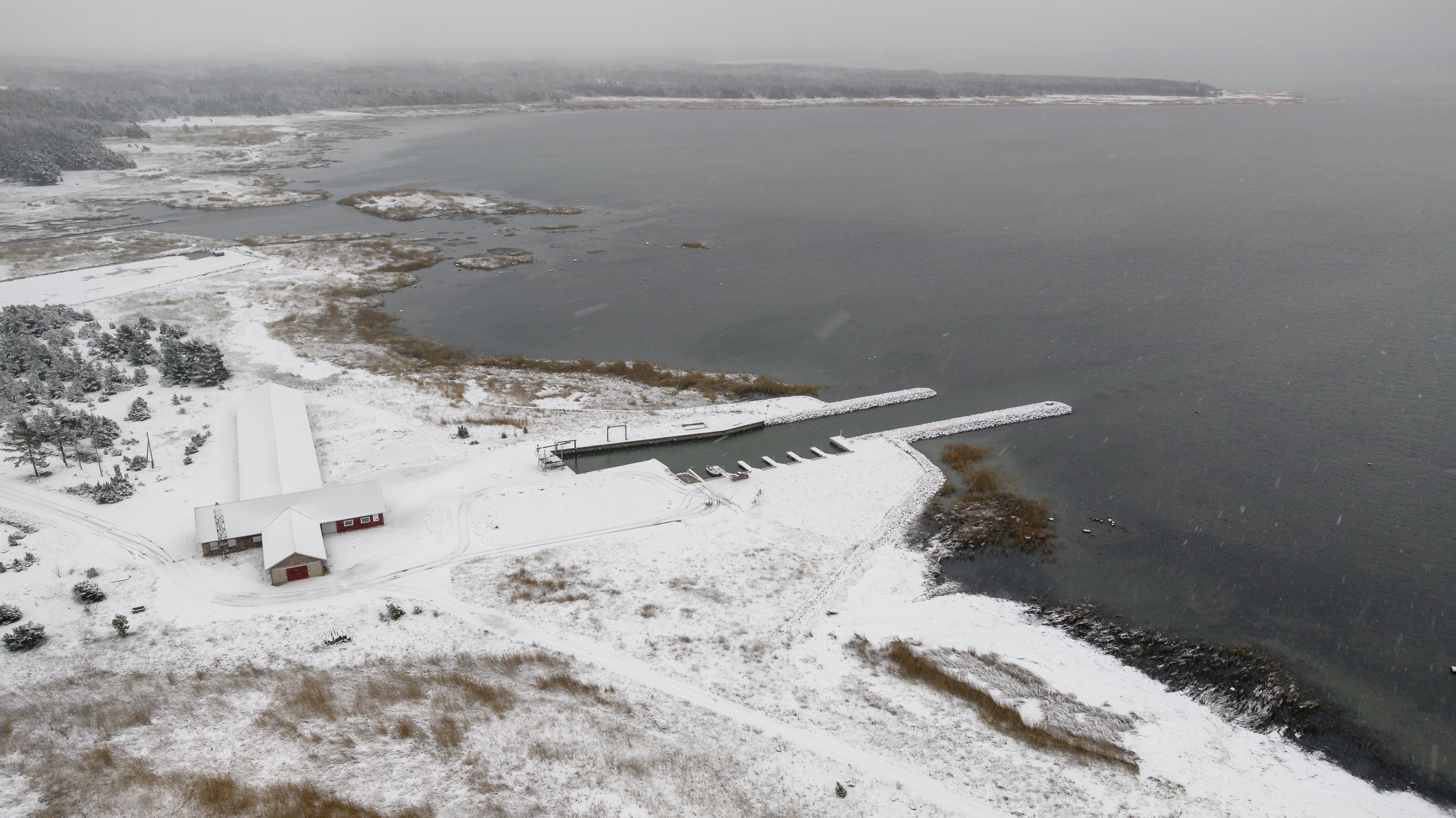
Haldi in 2023

Haldi is a village in Hiiumaa Parish, Hiiu County in northwestern Estonia.

The village was first mentioned in 1798 (Halti). Historically, the village was part of Emmaste Manor (German: Emmast).

Politician Verner Liik (1897–1958) was born in Haldi village.
