= Joaquín Méndez =

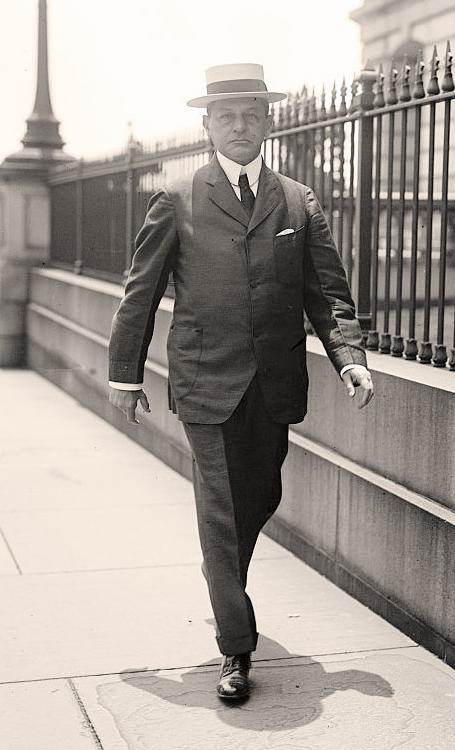
- Died: 20th Century
- Occupations: Ambassador to the United States, Journalist, Poet, and Diplomat
- Years active: 9 (as Ambassador)

Joaquín Méndez was a poet, journalist, politician, and a Guatemalan diplomat that work closely with President Manuel Estrada Cabrera throughout his career, which lasted from 1898 to 1920. He was the director of Tipografía Nacional de Guatemala (National Typography of Guatemala), minister of promotion, editor of La Locomotora (a magazine from the ministry of the government, its purpose was to direct the people), and he was the Guatemalan ambassador to the United States government. He represented Guatemala and as representative he signed the Treaty of Versailles after the First World War.

== Biography ==
President José María Reina Barrios placed Joaquín Méndez as the director of Tipografía Nacional de Guatemala (National Typography of Guatemala) and he was still in that position when the president was assassinated on February 8, 1898. The acting president, Manuel Estrada Cabrera, asked him to command the completion of a booklet that was very important for the new leader. The booklet was Oráculo novísimo (Newest Oracle) or libro de los destinos (Book of destinies). From the moment on a friendly relationship was made that lasted until the end of Cabrera's time as president. This was in large part due to Joaquin's friendly personality.

Joaquin's career inside Cabrera's administration advanced, mostly due to his gift with people. After La Locomotora stopped publishing in 1909 he continued working with the government. In 1911, when the administration of the President of the United States, William Howard Taft, wasn't able to make the Guatemalan government commit to accept an onerous loan, he served a very important diplomatic mission to the Secretary of State, Philander C. Knox. The purpose of his mission was to avoid the removal of Estrada Cabrera from the Guatemalan presidency. As a reward for his excellent labor, Estrada Cabrera named his as the Guatemalan ambassador. This took place in Washington on November 4, 1911. Joaquin remained in this position until April 1920, which was the end of the Cabrera administration.

== Bibliography ==
Arévalo Martínez, Rafael (1945). ¡Ecce Pericles!. Guatemala: Tipografía Nacional.

Fernández Ordóñez, Rodrigo (11 December 2013). "Dime con quien andas y te diré qué escribes: la amistad de Gómez Carrillo y Rubén Darío". Universidad Francisco Marroquín. Archived from the original on 28 March 2016.

Mendoza, Juan Manuel (1940). Enrique Gómez Carrillo; estudio crítico-biográfico: su vida, su obra y su época. Guatemala: Unión Tipográfica, Muñoz Plaza y Cía.

Estrada Paniagua, Felipe (1906). Filantropía. Guatemala: La Locomotora.
