= Mihkel Truusööt =

Estonian politician

Mihkel Truusööt (5 November 1903 in Kloostri Parish, Harju County – 23 March 1993 in Sweden) was an Estonian politician and businessman. He was a member of Estonian National Assembly (Estonian: Rahvuskogu) and former Minister of Economics.
