= August Lepik =

Estonian politician

August Lepik (also August Leppik; 6 February 1881 – 27 February 1955) was an Estonian politician. He was born in Pudivere, Lääne-Viru County. He was a member of Estonian National Assembly (Estonian: Rahvuskogu).
