= Eduard Laaman =

Estonian historian, journalist, and politician

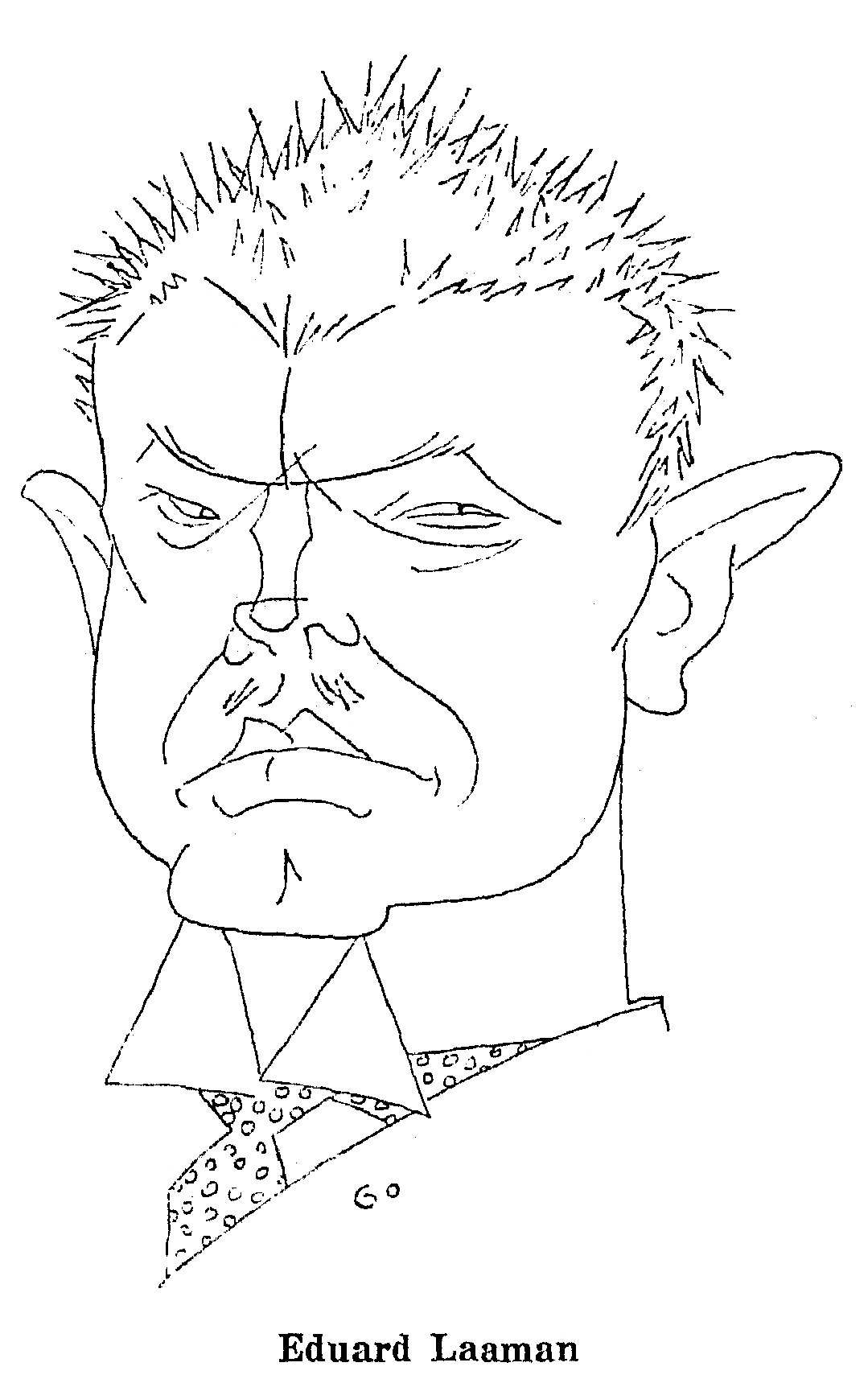

Eduard Laaman (born 12 February 1888 in Zamruk, Simferopolsky Uyezd, Taurida Governorate (now called Berehove in Bakhchysarai Raion, AR Crimea, Ukraine) – 1 September 1941 Kirov Oblast) was an Estonian historian, journalist and politician. He was a member of Estonian National Assembly (Estonian: Rahvuskogu).
