= Mihkel Juhkam =

Estonian politician (1884–1942)

Mihkel Juhkam (3 August 1884 in Küti Parish (now Vinni Parish), Wierland County – 28 January 1942 in Sosva camp, Sverdlovsk Oblast) was an Estonian politician. He was a member of the II, III, IV and IV Riigikogu. In 1929 he was minister of defence.
