= Jüri Ottas =

Estonian politician (1885–1942)

Jüri Ottas (also Georg Ottas; 14 October 1885 Vana-Kuuste Parish, Tartu County – 13 April 1942 Kirov Oblast, Russia) was an Estonian politician. He was a member of III Riigikogu.
