= Johan Sepp =

Estonian politician (1884–1953)

Johan Sepp (also Juhan Sepp; 5 June 1884 Saarde Parish, Kreis Pernau – 18 August 1953 New York) was an Estonian politician. In 1926 he was Minister of Justice.
