= Otto-Rudolf Pärlin =

Estonian politician (1887–1964)

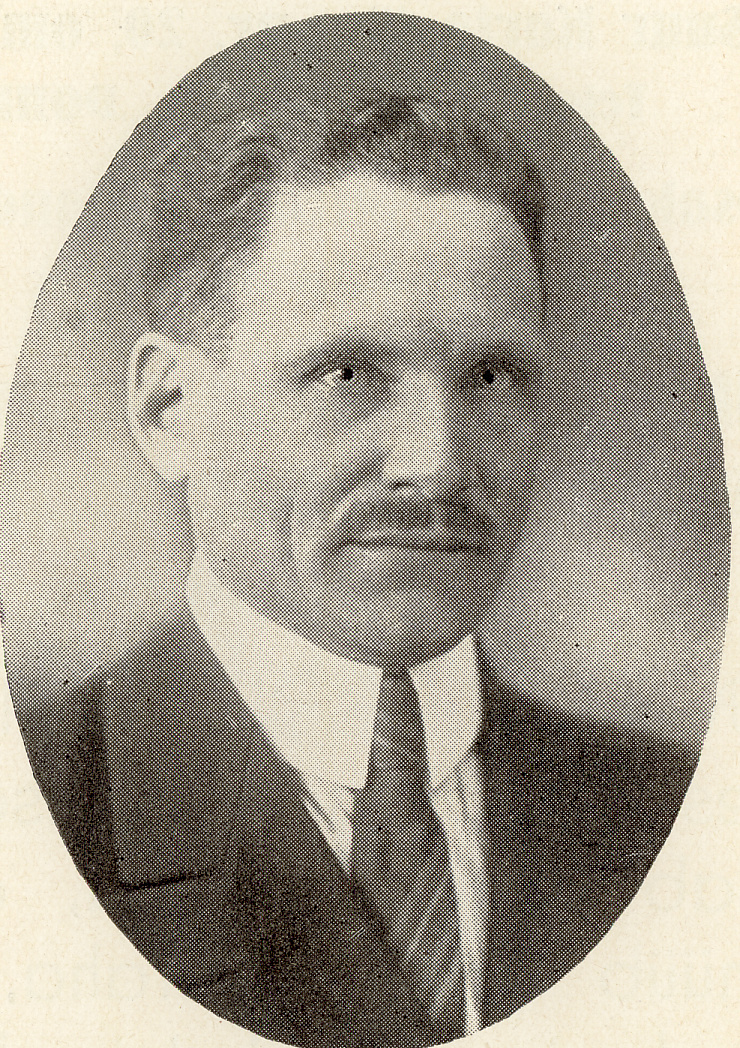
Otto-Rudolf Pärlin

Otto-Rudolf Pärlin (14 August 1887 Torma Parish (now Jõgeva Parish), Kreis Dorpat – 18 August 1964 Tartu) was an Estonian politician. He was a member of I Riigikogu.
