= Anton Palvadre =

Estonian lawyer and politician

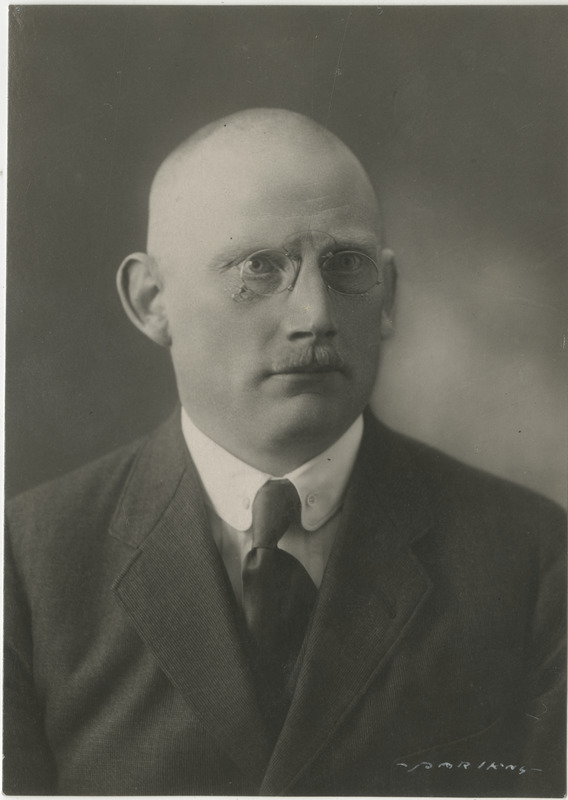
- Born: March 25, 1886; Korijärve, Kreis Dorpat
- Died: January 16, 1942 (aged 55) "Reform and Labor Camp" in Sverdlovsk Oblast
- Political party: Estonian Social Democratic Workers' Party

Anton Palvadre (25 March 1886 – 16 January 1942) was an Estonian lawyer and politician.

== Life ==
Palvadre was born in Korijärve, Kreis Dorpat (now Valga Parish). In 1906 he graduated from Orthodox Theological Seminary in Riga . In 1908 he was imprisoned by the tsarist authorities for reasons of revolutionary activity in Tartu and Riga. In 1911 Palvadre graduated from the Law Faculty of the University of Tartu and then worked as a lawyer. During World War I he served as a Russian officer on the front line and was in a German prison for three years.

In 1919 he became one of the leading heads of the Estonian Social Democratic Workers' Party.

He was an editor of the Sotsiaaldemokrat, an Estonian social democratic newspaper.

The Soviet authorities arrested Palvadre on June 14, 1941, and he was deported to Russia. He was sent to a Soviet Union prison. He died on January 16, 1942 of heart failure in a "reform and labor camp" in the Sverdlovsk Oblast.

== Personal life ==
Palvadre had five brothers. Rein Palvadre, Jaan Palvadre, Peeter Palvadre, Jakob Palvadre, Juhan Palvadre. Palvadre was married to Gerta Palvadre. The couple had two daughters, Lea and Aime. Palvadre's wife and children were deported in 1941. They lived for 15 years in the Kirov Oblast.
