= Estonian National Assembly =

1936 convened national assembly of Estonia

Estonian National Assembly (Estonian: Rahvuskogu) was a bicameral national assembly which was convened after the 1936 Estonian National Assembly referendum received popular support to draft a new constitution. The First Chamber had 80 members and was elected (although opposition parties were not allowed to stand), and the Second Chamber contained 40 representatives of corporate chambers. Elections for the First Chamber were held in December 1936 and the Estonian National Assembly sat between 18 February 1937 and 17 August 1937, approving a new constitution. The Riigikogu was substantially reformed and sat for its sixth session (VI Riigikogu) the following year.
