= 3rd Riigikogu =

Parliament of Estonia 1926–1929

The 3rd Riigikogu was the third legislature of the Estonian Parliament (Riigikogu). The legislature was elected after 1926 elections (held on 15–17 May 1926). It sat between 15 June 1926 and 14 June 1929, before the next round of elections were held.

== Officers ==
The following is a list of the Riigikogu's officers during the third legislative session:

=== Chairman ===
Karl Einbund, from 22 June 1926

=== First Assistant Chairman ===
Mihkel Martna, from 22 June 1926

=== Second Assistant Chairman ===
Rudolf Penno, from 22 June 1926

=== Secretary ===
Mihkel Juhkam, 22 June 1926 – 6 December 1928

August Tamman, from 11 December 1928

=== First Assistant Secretary ===
Karl-Ferdinand Kornel, 22 June 1926 – 23 July 1926

Oskar Karl Johann Liigand, from 23 July 1926

=== Second Assistant Secretary ===
Jaan Piiskar, from 22 June 1926
