= Members of the 2nd Riigikogu =

This is a list of members of the second legislature of the Estonian Parliament (Riigikogu) following the 1923 elections (held on 5–7 May 1923). It sat between 31 May 1923 and 14 June 1926, before the next round of elections were held.

== Officers ==
The following is a list of the Riigikogu's officers during the second legislative session:

=== Chairmen ===
- Jaan Tõnisson, 7 June 1923 – 27 May 1925
- August Rei, from 9 June 1925

=== First Assistant Chairmen ===
- Karl Johannes Virma, 7 June 1923 – 27 November 1924
- Jaan Soots, 27 November 1924 – 16 December 1924
- August Jürima, from 16 December 1924

=== Second Assistant Chairmen ===
- Aleksander Leopold Raudkepp, 7 June 1923 – 27 November 1924
- Karl Johannes Virma, 27 November 1924 – 16 December 1924
- Mihkel Martna, 16 December 1924 – 10 December 1925
- Tõnis Kalbus, 10 June 1925– 15 December 1925
- Johannes-Friedrich Zimmermann, 18 December 1925 – 18 February 1926
- Mihkel Juhkam, from 19 February 1926

=== Secretary ===
- Tõnis Kalbus, 7 June 1923 – 10 June 1925
- Johan Holberg, from 10 June 1925

=== First Assistant Secretary ===
- Oskar Köster, 7 June 1923 – 27 November 1924
- Johan Holberg, 27 November 1924 – 10 June 1925
- Aleksander Leopold Raudkepp, from 10 June 1925

=== Second Assistant Secretary ===
- Jaan Vain, 7 June 1923 – 27 November 1924
- Jaan Piiskar, from 27 November 1924

== List of members ==
Name	Start of term	End of term
Georg Abels	29 February 1924 (replacing Jaan Tomp)	22 March 1924 (replaced by Eduard Luts)
Hendrik Allik	Start of session	29 January 1923 (replaced by Jaan Miger)
Oskar Amberg	Start of session	12 February 1926 (replaced by Johann Bergmann)
Ado Anderkopp	Start of session	End of session
Johanna Andreesen	17 May 1924 (replacing Eduard Parts)	4 June 1924 (resigned; replaced by Aleksander Rimmel)
Hendrik Anniko	Start of session	End of session
Hindrik Anto	5 June 1925 (replacing Peeter Lindau)	End of session
Konrad Arras	Start of session	End of session
Christian Arro	Start of session	7 November 1924 (replaced by Hans Mitt)
Karl Ast	Start of session	End of session
Karl August Baars	Start of session	End of session
Peeter Baranin	Start of session	End of session
Heinrich Nikolai Bauer	Start of session	End of session
Jaan-Johann Bergman	12 February 1926 (replacing Oskar Amberg)	15 February 1926 (replaced by Hans Leesment)
Eduard Birkenberg	Start of session	End of session
Max Woldemar Gustav Eduard Bock	27 September 1923 (replacing Martin Luther)	29 September 1923 (replaced by Gerhard Kress)
Eduard Brok	4 June 1924 (replacing Jaan Vaher)	End of session
Kaarel Eenpalu	Start of session	End of session
August Ehrlich	Start of session	9 July 1923 (resigned; replaced by Anton Tõnis Jürgenstein)
Arnold Ehrstein	31 December 1924 (replacing August Männikson)	End of session
Jaan Eigo	8 October 1923 (replacing Hans Soots)	End of session
Bernhard Eilman	Start of session	End of session
Aleksander Erdman	29 February 1924 (replacing Vladimir Kangur)	5 April 1924 (replaced by Eduard Parts)
Vassili Grigorjev	Start of session	End of session
Oskar Gustavson	Start of session	End of session
Johannes Gutmann	19 November 1923 (replacing Jaak Reichmann)	5 October 1925 (replaced by Ernst Masik)
Werner Richard Karl Hasselblatt	Start of session	End of session
Hans Heidemann	Start of session	10 March 1924 (replaced by Oskar Sepre)
Johan Holberg	Start of session	End of session
Jaan Hünerson	Start of session	End of session
Karl Robert Indermitte	Start of session	End of session
Karl Ipsberg	Start of session	End of session
Jüri Jaakson	Start of session	End of session
Johannes Janis	Start of session	End of session
Peeter Jakobson	1 October 1924 (replacing Paul Tamme)	14 September 1925 (replaced by Mihkel Neps)
Johan Jans	Start of session	End of session
Aleksander Janson	27 June 1923 (replacing Johannes Lauristini)	29 February 1924 (replaced by Anton Mangman)
Mihkel Janson	Start of session	3 October 1925 (replaced by Alma Ostra-Oinas)
Leopold Johannes Johanson	Start of session	End of session
Erich Joonas	Start of session	End of session
Mihkel Juhkam	Start of session	End of session
Aleksander Jõeäär	Start of session	End of session
Peeter Järve	24 April 1925 (replacing Jaan Nuudi)	End of session
Georg Jürgenson	22 November 1924 (replacing Aleksander Rimmel)	18 December 1924 (replaced by Jüri Kurul)
Anton Tõnis Jürgenstein	9 July 1923 (replacing August Ehrlich)	25 October 1924 (replaced by Jakob Westholm)
August Jürima	Start of session	End of session
Johannes Jürna	3 April 1924 (replacing Anton Mangman)	End of session
Kristjan Kaarna	Start of session	End of session
Hugo Kaas	9 April 1924 (replacing Peeter Michelson)	17 May 1924 (replaced by Kristjan Saavo)
Tõnis Kalbus	Start of session	End of session
Johann Kana	28 October 1925 (replacing Juhan Kuuke)	End of session
Mart Kangur	Start of session	29 February 1924 (replaced by Aleksander Erdman)
Paul Keerdo	Start of session	29 February 1924 (replaced by Hans Tirusson)
August Kerem	Start of session	End of session
Johann Kesküll	Start of session	14 February 1924 (replaced by Johannes Mürk)
Eduard Kingsepp	22 March 1924 (replacing Jaan Tagel)	25 April 1924 (replacing Alexander Liiber)
Karl-Ferdinand Kornel	Start of session	End of session
Voldemar Krabi	26 March 1926 (replacing Aleksander Oinas)	End of session
Johannes Krass	19 August 1924 (replacing Alfred Küti)	End of session
Gerhard Kress	29 September 1923 (replacing Max Bock)	9 April 1924 (resigned; replaced by Axel de Vries)
Gustav Kroon	25 July 1923 (replacing Jüri Uluots)	End of session
Martin Krusemann	7 October 1925 (replacing Aleksander Lensman)	7 November 1925 (replaced by Johann Ploompuu)
Juhan Kukk	Start of session	28 October 1925 (replaced by Johann Kana)
Boris Kumm	19 August 1924 (replacing Jaak Nanilson)	24 September 1924 (replaced by Jüri Visk)
Jüri Kurul	18 December 1924 (replacing Georg Jürgenson)	29 May 1925 (replaced by Aleksander Lensman)
Aleksander Kärner	Start of session	End of session
Oskar Köster	Start of session	End of session
Alfred Kütt	Start of session	19 August 1924 (replaced by Johannes Krass)
Mihkel Laar	8 March 1924 (replacing Jaan Miger)	22 March 1924 (resigned; replaced by Peeter Michelson)
Mats Laarman	Start of session	End of session
Johan Laidoner	Start of session	End of session
Julius Lambot	6 February 1926 (replacing Ernst Constantin Weberman)	End of session
Gustav Lange	4 June 1924 (replacing Johannes Sillenberg)	26 June 1924 (replaced by Elise Priks)
Heinrich Laretei	Start of session	End of session
Jaan Lattik	Start of session	13 March 1926 (replaced by Aleksander Tenneberg)
Johannes Lauristin	7 June 1923 (replacing Aleksander Mahlberg)	27 June 1923 (replaced by Aleksander Janson)
Hans Leesment	15 February 1926 (replacing Jaan-Johann Bergmann)	End of session
Alice Leevald	18 February 1924 (replacing Johannes Reesen)	22 March 1924 (resigned; replaced by Jaak Nanilson)
Aleksander Lensman	29 May 1925 (replacing Jüri Kuruli)	7 October 1925 (resigned; replaced by Martin Kruusemann)
Aleksander Liiber	25 April 1924 (replacing Eduard Kingsepa)	17 May 1924 (replaced by Jaan Vaher)
Oskar Karl Johann Liigand	Start of session	End of session
Peeter Lindau	29 January 1925 (replacing Jaan Veldi)	5 June 1925 (replaced by Hindrik Anto)
Voldemar Linnamägi	Start of session	End of session
Paul-Eduard Luiga	10 March 1924 (replacing Victor Mutt)	End of session
Martin Luther	Start of session	27 September 1923 (replaced by Max Block)
Eduard Luts	22 March 1924 (replacing Georg Abels)	22 November 1924 (replaced by Aleksander Metusala)
Juhan Albert Luur	Start of session	End of session
Villem Maaker	Start of session	End of session
Aleksander Mahlberg	Start of session	7 June 1923 (replaced by Johannes Lauristin)
Juhan Maksim	18 November 1924 (replacing Johann Pennenik)	20 December 1924 (replaced by August Männikson)
Anton Mangman	29 February 1924 (replacing Aleksander Janson)	3 April 1924 (replaced by Johannes Jürna)
Märt Martinson	Start of session	End of session
Mihkel Martna	Start of session	End of session
Ernst Masik	5 October 1925 (replacing Johannes Gutman)	End of session
Johannes Meier	Start of session	7 June 1923 (replaced by Carl Schilling)
Aleksander Metusala	22 November 1924 (replacing Eduard Lutsu)	End of session
Peeter Michelson	22 March 1924 (replacing Mihkel Laar)	9 April 1924 (replaced by Hugo Kaas)
Jaan Miger	29 February 1924 (replaced Hendrik Allik)	8 March 1924 (replaced by Mikhel Laar)
Hans Mitt	7 November 1924 (replacing Christjan Arro)	24 November 1924 (replaced by Jaan Nuut)
Ernst Martinson	Start of session	End of session
Juhan Must	12 April 1924 (replacing Peeter Palover)	25 April 1924 (replaced by Eduard Peterson)
Victor Mutt	Start of session	10 March 1924 (replaced by Paul-Eduard Luiga)
August Männikson	20 December 1924 (replacing Juhan Maksim)	31 December 1924 (replaced by Arnold Ehrstein)
Johannes Märtson	Start of session	End of session
August Mühlberg	9 April 1924 (replacing Oskar Sepre)	17 May 1924 (replaced by Johannes Sillenberg)
Johannes Mürk	14 February 1924 (replacing Johann Kesküll)	End of session
Jaak Nanilson	22 March 1924 (replacing Alice Leevaldi)	19 August 1924 (replaced by Boris Kumm)
Mihkel Neps	14 September 1925 (replacing Peter Jakobson)	15 January 1926 (replaced by Kirill Ulk)
Jaan Nuut	24 November 1924 (replacing Hans Mitt)	24 April 1925 (replaced by Peeter Järve)
Andres Nõmme	26 May 1924 (replacing Rudolf Pächter)	26 June 1924 (replaced by Paul Tamm)
Aleksander Oinas	Start of session	26 March 1926 (replaced by Voldemar Krabi)
Benedikt Oskar Oja	18 July 1923 (replacing Arnold Schulbach)	End of session
Alma Ostra-Oinas	3 October 1925 (replacing Mihkel Janson)	End of session
Hindrik Ostrat	Start of session	End of session
Peeter Palovere	22 March 1924 (replacing Hans Tirusson)	12 April 1924 (replaced by Juhan Must)
Anton Palvadre	Start of session	24 December 1924 (replaced by Peeter Schütz)
Eduard Parts	5 April 1924 (replacing Aleksander Erdman)	17 May 1924 (replaced by Johanna Andreesen)
Rudolf Penno	Start of session	End of session
Eduard Peterson	25 April 1924 (replacing Juhan Musta)	End of session
Jaan Piiskar	Start of session	End of session
Mihkel Pikkur	1 October 1924 (replacing Jüri Viski)	14 November 1924 (replaced by Johann Põlenik)
Johann Ploompuu	10 November 1925 (replacing Martin Kruusemann)	End of session
Theodor Pool	Start of session	End of session
Aleksander Porman	Start of session	End of session
Elise Priks	26 June 1924 (replacing Gustav Lange)	22 November 1924 (replaced by Kristjan Raudsepp)
Johann Põlenik	14 November 1924 (replacing Mihkel Pikkuri)	18 November 1924 (replaced by Juhan Maksim)
Rudolf Pächter	17 May 1924 (replacing Eduard Tiiman)	26 May 1924 (replaced by Andres Nõmme)
Rudolf Pälson	Start of session	22 March 1924 (replaced by Adolf Zillmer)
Otto-Rudolf Pärlin	Start of session	End of session
Konstantin Päts	Start of session	End of session
Aleksander Leopold Raudkepp	Start of session	End of session
Kristjan Raudsepp	22 November 1924 (replacing Elise Priks)	End of session
Jaan Rea	Start of session	20 May 1924 (replaced by Jaan Velt)
Johannes Reesen	Start of session	18 February 1924 (resigned; replaced by Alice Leevald)
August Rei	Start of session	End of session
Johan Reichman	Start of session	15 October 1923 (replaced by Jaan Soots)
Jaak Reichmann	Start of session	19 November 1923 (replaced by Johannes Gutman)
Aleksander Reinson	18 February 1924 (replacing Rudolf Veirami)	8 March 1924 (replaced by Jaan Tagel)
Aleksander Rimmel	5 June 1924 (replacing Johanna Andreesen)	22 November 1924 (replaced by Georg Jürgenson)
Johan-Oskar Rütli	Start of session	24 January 1924 (replaced by Juhan Sepp)
Kristjan Saavo	17 May 1924 (replacing Hugo Kaas)	End of session
Carl Schilling	7 June 1923 (replacing Johann Meier)	End of session
Arnold Paul Schulbach	9 July 1923 (replacing Fritz Suit)	18 July 1923 (replaced by Benedikt Oskar Oja)
Peeter Schütz	24 December 1923 (replacing Anton Palvadre)	End of session
Ivan Seljugin	Start of session	End of session
Juhan Sepp	24 January 1924 (replacing Johan-Oskar Rütli)	End of session
Oskar Sepre	10 March 1924 (replacing Hans Heidemann)	9 April 1924 (replaced by August Mühlberg)
Sergei Shtsherbakov	Start of session	End of session
August Voldemar Siiak	23 March 1926 (replacing Konstantin Tamm-Stamm)	End of session
Johannes Sillenberg	17 May 1924 (replacing August Mühlberg)	4 June 1924 (replaced by Gustav Lange)
Jegor Solovjov	Start of session	End of session
Hans Soots	Start of session	8 October 1923 (replaced by Jaan Eigo)
Jaan Soots	15 October 1923 (replacing Johan Reichman)	End of session
Otto August Strandman	Start of session	End of session
Fritz Suit	Start of session	9 July 1923 (replaced by Arnold Paul Schulbach)
Adolf Zilmer	22 March 1924 (replacing Rudolf Pälson)	9 April 1924 (resigned; replaced by Eduard Tiiman)
Johannes-Friedrich Zimmermann	Start of session	End of session
Jaan Tagel	8 March 1924 (replacing Aleksander Reinson)	22 March 1924 (replaced by Eduard Kingsepp)
Theodor Tallmeister	Start of session	End of session
Aleksander Tamm	Start of session	End of session
Karl Tamm	Start of session	End of session
Paul Tamm	26 June 1924 (replacing Andres Nõmme)	1 October 1924 (replaced by Peeter Jakobson)
Konstantin Tamm-Stamm	18 March 1926 (replacing Alexander Tenneberg)	23 March 1926 (replaced by August Voldemar Siiak)
Jaan Teemant	Start of session	End of session
Jaan Teetsov	Start of session	End of session
Aleksander Tenneberg	13 March 1926 (replacing Jaan Lattik)	18 March 1926 (resigned; replaced by Konstantin Tamm-Stamm)
Eduard Tiiman	9 April 1924 (replacing Adolf Zillmeri)	17 May 1924 (replaced by Rudolf Pächter)
Jaan Tiks	Start of session	End of session
Hans Tirusson	29 February 1924 (replacing Harald-Paul Keerdo)	22 March 1924 (replaced by Peeter Palovere)
Jaan Tomp	Start of session	29 February 1924 (resigned; replaced by Georg Abels)
Kustas Tonkmann	Start of session	End of session
Peeter Treiberg	Start of session	31 March 1924 (replaced by August Vomm)
Artur Tupits	Start of session	End of session
Jaan Tõnisson	Start of session	End of session
Johannes-Heinrich Uibopuu	Start of session	End of session
Kirill Ulk	15 January 1926 (replacing Mihkel Nepsi)	End of session
Jüri Uluots	Start of session	25 July 1923 (replaced by Gustav Kroon)
Jaan Vaher	17 May 1924 (replacing Aleksander Liiber)	4 June 1924 (replaced by Eduard Brok)
Jaan Vain	Start of session	End of session
Ernst Constantin Weberman	Start of session	6 February 1926 (replaced by Julius Lambot)
Rudolf Veiram	Start of session	18 February 1924 (resigned; replaced by Aleksander Reinson)
Jaan Velt	20 May 1924 (replacing Jaan Rea)	29 January 1925 (replaced by Peeter Lindau)
Jakob Westholm	25 October 1924 (replacing Anton Tõnis Jürgenstein)	End of session
Karl Johannes Virma	Start of session	End of session
Jüri Visk	24 September 1924 (replacing Boris Kumm)	1 October 1924 (replaced by Mihkel Pikkur)
Jüri Voiman	Start of session	End of session
August Vomm	31 March 1924 (replacing Peeter Treiberg)	End of session
Axel de Vries	9 April 1924 (replacing Gerhard Kress)	End of session

== Further information ==
- "II Riigikogu koosseis [Composition of the second Riigikogu]", Riigikogu (in Estonian).
