= German-Baltic Party =

Estonian political party

German-Baltic Party Saksa-Balti Erakond
- Founder: Christoph von Mickwitz
- Founded: 1918
- Dissolved: 1935
- Ideology: German minority interests
- Colours: Red

The German-Baltic Party (Estonian: Saksa-Balti erakond; German: Deutsch-baltische Partei in Estland, DbPE) was a political party in Estonia representing the German minority.

== History ==
The party was established on 27 November 1918 under the name German Party in Estonia (German: Deutsche Partei in Estland, Estonian: Saksa Erakond Eestimaal) in preparation for the Constituent Assembly elections the following April. Following the Estonian War of Independence, the party was renamed the German-Baltic Party.

The party won three seats in the elections in April 1919. In the parliamentary elections in 1920 it won four seats, but was reduced to three seats in the 1923 elections and two seats in the 1926 elections. For the 1929 elections the party formed the German-Swedish Bloc, winning three seats. This was continued for the 1932 elections, with the bloc again winning three seats.

== List of MPs ==
Parliament	Members	Notes
1919–20	Max Bock	Chairman
1919–20	Hermann Koch	
1919–20	Johannes Meyer	Replaced by Georg von Stackelberg on 27 January 1920
1920–1923	Max Bock	Chairman
1920–1923	Hermann Koch	
1920–1923	Walter von Pezold	
1920–1923	Georg von Stackelberg	
1923–1926	Werner Hasselblatt	Chairman
1923–1926	Carl von Schilling	
1923–1926	Martin Christian Luther	Replaced by Gerhard Kreß on 1 October 1923, replaced by Axel de Vries on 9 April 1924
1926–1929	Werner Hasselblatt	Chairman
1926–1929	Carl von Schilling	
1929–1932	Carl von Schilling	Chairman
1929–1932	Werner Hasselblatt	
1929–1932	Hans Pöhl	Swedish, replaced by Mathias Westerblom on 22 January 1930
1932–1934	Carl von Schilling	Chairman
1932–1934	Hermann Koch	
1932–1934	Mathias Westerblom	Swedish
