= Oskar Sepre =

Estonian communist

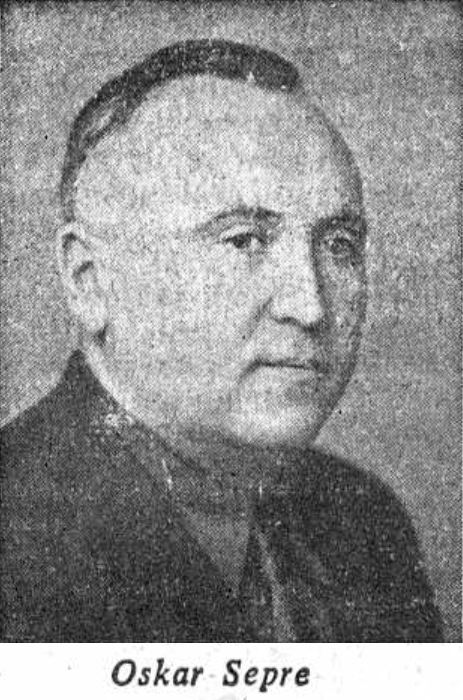
Oskar Sepre

Oskar Sepre (20 May 1900 in Kabala Parish (now Türi Parish), Kreis Fellin – 23 November 1965 in Tallinn) was an Estonian communist politician. He was a member of II Riigikogu. He was a member of the Riigikogu since 10 March 1924. He replaced Hans Heidemann. On 9 April 1924, he resigned his position and he was replaced by August Mühlberg.

In 1924, Sepre was arrested by Estonian authorities and sentenced to 149 years of forced labor for his participation in the anti-state Workers' United Front communist front organization. He was released by the 1938 Amnesty Act.
