= Johannes Mürk =

Estonian politician (1874–1946)

Johannes Mürk (17 August 1874 Vana-Põltsamaa Parish (now Põltsamaa Parish), Kreis Fellin – 21 July 1946 Malmö, Sweden) was an Estonian politician. He was a member of II Riigikogu. He was a member of the Riigikogu since 14 February 1924. He replaced Johann Kesküll.
