= Hans Heidemann =

Estonian politician

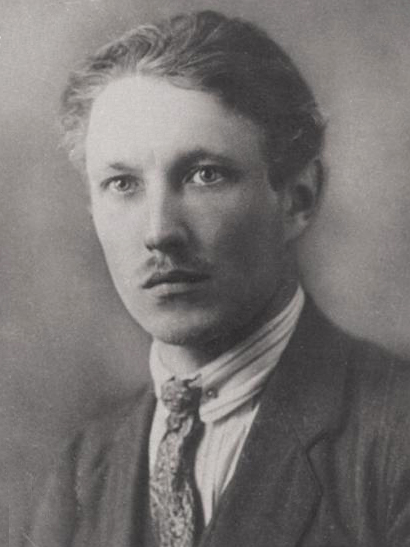
Hans Heidemann

Hans Heidemann (9 November 1896 Taagepera Parish (now Tõrva Parish), Kreis Fellin – 29 August 1925 near Tartu) was an Estonian politician. He was a member of II Riigikogu, representing the Workers' United Front. On 10 March 1924, he resigned his position and he was replaced by Oskar Sepre. He participated in the preparations of the 1924 Estonian coup d'état attempt, but he was arrested already in September 1924. In 1925, he was given a death sentence by an Estonian military tribunal and executed.
