= Kütt =

Family name

Kütt is an Estonian surname (meaning "hunter"). Notable people with this surname include:

- Alfred Kütt (1894–?), Estonian politician
- Helmen Kütt (born 1961), Estonian politician
- Kert Kütt (born 1980), Estonian footballer
- Roland Kütt (born 1987), Estonian footballer
