= Kirill Ulk =

Estonian politician

Kirill Ulk (1886 Pärsamaa Parish (now Saaremaa Parish), Kreis Ösel – ?) was an Estonian politician. He was a member of II Riigikogu. He was a member of the Riigikogu since 15 January 1926, representing the Estonian Socialist Workers' Party. He replaced Mihkel Neps.
