= Visk =

Visk may refer to:

== People ==
- Erna Visk (1910–1983), Estonian and Soviet politician
- Jüri Visk (1885–1957), Estonian politician

== Places ==
- Visk, Danish name of Wisch, Nordfriesland, Denmark
- Visk, former name of Vyškovce nad Ipľom, Slovakia
- Visk, Hungarian name of Vyshkovo, Ukraine
