= Ernst Masik =

Estonian politician

Ernst Masik (also Ernst Maasik; 1 December 1890 Helme Parish (now Tõrva Parish), Kreis Fellin – 18 December 1949 Tavda, Sverdlovsk Oblast, Russian SFSR) was an Estonian politician. He was a member of II Riigikogu. He was a member of the Riigikogu since 5 October 1925. He replaced Johannes Gutmann.
