= Hugo Kaas =

Estonian politician

Hugo Kaas (2 May 1892 – 31 July 1941 Tartu) was an Estonian politician. He was a member of II Riigikogu. He was a member of the Riigikogu since 9 April 1924, representing the Workers' United Front. He replaced Peeter Michelson. On 17 May 1924, he was removed from his position and he was replaced by Kristjan Saavo. He was arrested by German occupation authorities and shot in Tartu on 31 July 1941.
