= Richard Mahl =

Estonian chemist

Richard Mahl (28 August 1898, Kreis Ösel – 26 June 1964, Tallinn) was an Estonian chemist.

In 1930, he graduated from Leningrad Polytechnical Institute in chemistry.

1948–1951, he was the rector of Tallinn Polytechnical Institute.
