= Economic Group =

Economic Group may refer to:

- Corporate group, a collection of parent and subsidiary corporations.
- Economic Group (Estonia)
- Economic Group (Saskatchewan)
- Socio-economic group
