= Aleksander Jõeäär =

Estonian politician (1890–1959)

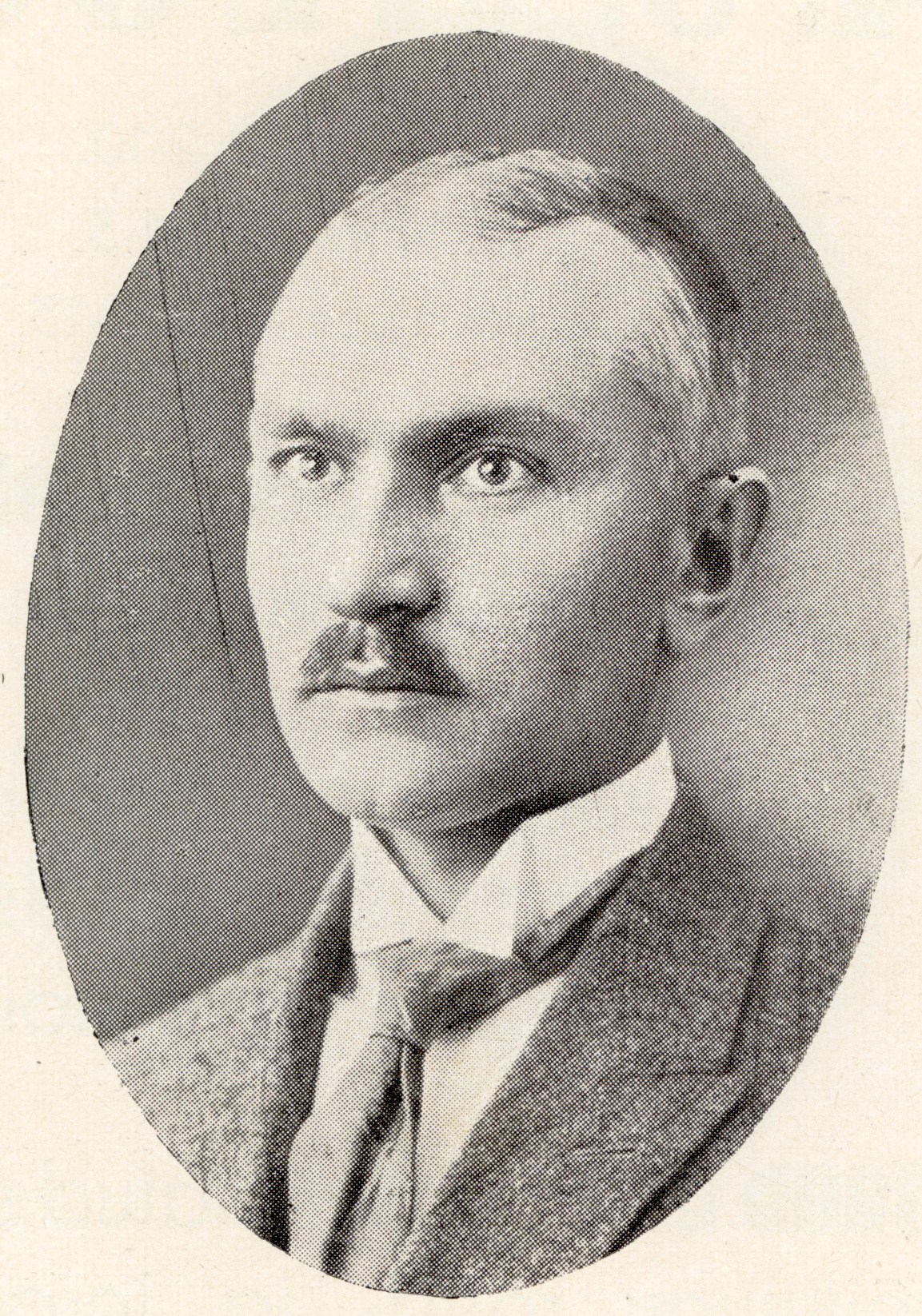
- Born: 31 October 1890; Laimjala, Kreis Ösel
- Died: 20 May 1959 (aged 68); Tallinn, Estonia
- Occupations: Politician, lawyer
- Known for: Member of the I, II, III, IV and V Riigikogu

Aleksander Jõeäär (31 October 1890 in Laimjala, Kreis Ösel – 20 May 1959 in Tallinn) was an Estonian politician and lawyer. He was a member of the I, II, III, IV and V Riigikogu.

He was also a member of Soviet Estonia's Johannes Vares' cabinet. He was appointed as Minister of Agricultural Affairs.
