= Anton Mangman =

Estonian politician

Anton Mangman (10 January 1900 Väätsa Parish (now Türi Parish), Jerwen County – 11 November 1937 Soviet Union) was an Estonian politician. He was a member of II Riigikogu. He was a member of the Riigikogu since 29 February 1924. He replaced Aleksander Janson. On 3 April 1924, he resigned his position and he was replaced by Johannes Jürna.
