= Aleksander Paikre =

Estonian politician

Aleksander Paikre (also Aleksander Porman(n); 30 December 1871, in Lehtse Parish (now Tapa Parish), Jerwen County – 2 August 1955, in Tapa) was an Estonian politician. He was a member of II Riigikogu.
