= Laarman =

Laarman is a surname. Notable people with the surname include:

- Joris Laarman (born 1979), Dutch designer, artist, furniture maker, and entrepreneur
- Loudia Laarman (born 1991), Haitian-born Canadian sprinter
- Mats Laarman (1873–1964), Estonian politician
