= Julius Lambot =

Estonian politician

Julius Lambot (14 August 1866 Nehatu Parish, Harrien County – 11 August 1941 Iru Parish, Harju County) was an Estonian politician. He was a member of II Riigikogu, representing the National Liberal Party. He was a member of the Riigikogu since 6 February 1926. He replaced Ernst Constantin Weberman.
