= Jaan Vaher =

Estonian politician

Jaan Vaher (1871–?) was an Estonian politician. He was a member of II Riigikogu. He was a member of the Riigikogu since 17 May 1924, representing the Workers' United Front. He replaced Aleksander Liiber. On 4 June 1924, he resigned his position and he was replaced by Eduard Brok.
