= Aleksander Kärner =

Estonian politician (1880–1942)

Aleksander Kärner (8 February 1880 Maasi Parish (now Saaremaa Parish), Kreis Ösel – 9 March 1942 Perm Oblast, Russian SFSR) was an Estonian politician. He was a member of II Riigikogu.
