= Krabi (disambiguation) =

Krabi can refer to:

- the town Krabi in Thailand
  - the Krabi Province
  - Amphoe Mueang Krabi, the district around Krabi town
  - the Krabi River
  - Krabi Airport
  - Krabi Airline
- an old Siamese sword, see Krabi (sword)
- HTMS Krabi, a Thai Royal Navy ship
- Krabi, Estonia, village in Rõuge Parish, Võru County, Estonia
- Voldemar Krabi, Estonian politician
