= Hendrik Anniko =

Estonian politician

Hendrik Anniko (also Heinrich Anniko; 8 August 1867 Holdre Parish (now Tõrva Parish), Kreis Fellin – 27 November 1954 Baltimore, United States) was an Estonian politician. He was a member of II Riigikogu.
