= Peeter Jakobson =

Peeter Jakobson may refer to:

- Peeter Jakobson (politician) (1875–?), Estonian politician
- Peeter Jakobson (writer) (1854–1899), Estonian writer
