= Hans Soots =

Estonian politician

Hans Soots (10 July 1886 Polli Parish (now Mulgi Parish), Kreis Pernau – 4 June 1937 Pöögle Parish, Viljandi County) was an Estonian politician. He was a member of II Riigikogu, representing the Farmers' Assemblies. On 8 October 1923, he resigned his position and he was replaced by Jaan Eigo.
