= Eduard Kägu =

Estonian politician (1900–1924)

Eduard Kägu (14 June 1900, in Võtikvere Parish (now Mustvee Parish), Kreis Dorpat – 1 December 1924, in Tallinn) was an Estonian politician. He was a member of the I Riigikogu, representing the Central Committee of Tallinn Trade Unions, from 20 October 1921 until he resigned on 6 December 1922. He replaced Johannes-August Allikso and was succeeded by Aleksander Leopold Raudkepp.

He died in the 1924 Estonian coup d'état attempt.
