= Jaan Rea =

Estonian politician

Jaan Rea (30 June 1896 Seli Parish (now Pärnu), Kreis Pernau – 1937, Soviet Union) was an Estonian politician. He was a member of II Riigikogu, representing the Workers' United Front. On 20 May 1924, he resigned from his position and he was replaced by Jaan Velt. Rea participated in the preparations of the 1924 Estonian coup d'état attempt. After the failure of the coup attempt, he fled to the Soviet Union.
