= Rudolf Veiram =

Estonian politician

Rudolf Veiram (1885 Illuka Parish (now Alutaguse Parish), Kreis Wierland – 1941 Soviet Union) was an Estonian politician. He was a member of II Riigikogu, representing the Workers' United Front. On 18 February 1924, he resigned his position and he was replaced by Aleksander Reinson.
