= Karl Robert Indermitte =

Estonian politician

Karl Robert Indermitte (5 April 1883 Mäo Parish (now Paide), Jerwen County – 10 May 1945 Paide Parish, Järva County) was an Estonian politician. He was a member of II Riigikogu.
