= Kras =

Kras may refer to:

- Karst Plateau, known in Slovene as Kras, a limestone borderline plateau region in southwestern Slovenia
- KRAS - a protein V-Ki-ras2 Kirsten rat sarcoma viral oncogene homolog
- Kras Stadion, a stadium in Volendam, Netherlands
- Kras, Istria County, a village near Buzet, Istria County, Croatia
- Kras, Krk, a village near Dobrinj, Primorje-Gorski Kotar County, Croatia
- Kraš, Croatian food company
- Kraš (surname)
- Mustang Beach Airport, Port Aransas, Mustang Island, Texas (designated KRAS)
