= Eduard Luts =

Estonian politician

Eduard Luts (1899 Karula Parish (now Viljandi Parish), Kreis Fellin – 21 December 1942 near Velikiye Luki, Russian SFSR) was an Estonian politician. He was a member of II Riigikogu. He was a member of the Riigikogu since 22 March 1924. He replaced Georg Abels. On 22 November 1924, he resigned his position and he was replaced by Aleksander Metusala.
