= Johannes Jürna =

Estonian politician

Johannes Jürna (30 June 1895 Rapla Parish, Harrien County – 13 March 1930 Tallinn) was an Estonian politician. He was a member of II Riigikogu. He was a member of the Riigikogu since 3 April 1924, representing the Workers' United Front. He replaced Anton Mangman. Working as an underground organizer of the Communist Party of Estonia, Jürna was shot by the Estonian security police on 13 March 1930 in Tallinn while resisting arrest.
