= Aleksander Reinson =

Estonian politician

Aleksander Reinson (29 May 1890 Tartu – 13 October 1975) was an Estonian politician. He was a member of II Riigikogu, representing the Workers' United Front. He was a member of the Riigikogu since 18 February 1924. He replaced Rudolf Veiram. On 8 March 1924, he resigned his position and he was replaced by Jaan Tagel.
