= Johannes Sillenberg =

Estonian politician (1890–1978)

Johannes Sillenberg (29 September 1890 Puurmani Parish (now Põltsamaa Parish), Kreis Dorpat – 27 June 1978) was an Estonian politician. He was a member of II Riigikogu. He was a member of the Riigikogu since 17 May 1924, representing the Workers' United Front. He replaced August Mühlberg. On 4 June 1924, he resigned his position and he was replaced by Gustav Lange.
