= Jaan Miger =

Estonian politician

Jaan Miger (also Jaan Migger; 30 January 1859, Tarvastu Parish (now Viljandi Parish), Kreis Fellin – 3 September 1940, Tartu) was an Estonian politician. He was a member of II Riigikogu. He was a member of the Riigikogu since 29 February 1924. Miger replaced Hendrik Allik until 8 March 1924, when he resigned from his position, and he was replaced by Mihkel Laar.
