= Treial =

Family name

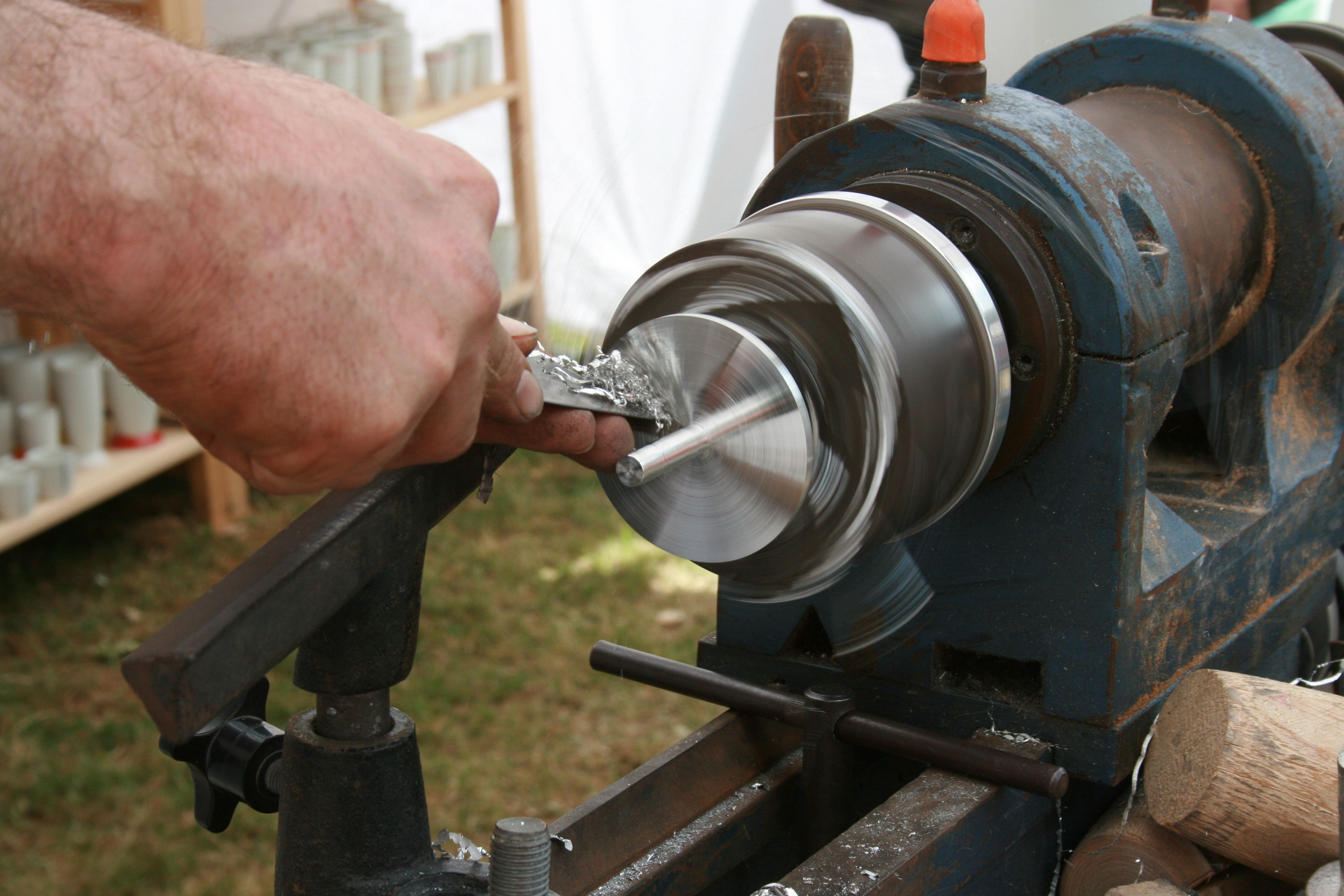

Origin
- Language: Estonian
- Meaning: turner, lathe operator
- Region of origin: Estonia

Treial is an Estonian occupational surname meaning "turner" and "lathe operator". As of 1 January 2022, 151 men and 146 women in Estonia have the surname Treial. Treial is ranked as the 460th most common surname for men in Estonia, and the 548th most common surname for Estonian women. The surname Treial is most common in Järva County, where 6.07 per 10,000 inhabitants of the county bear the surname.

Notable people bearing the surname Treial include:

- Henn Treial (1905–1941), journalist, editor and politician
- Henri Treial (born 1992), volleyball player
- Hugo Treial (1898–1976), lawyer (:et)
- Jaan Treial (1896–1918), politician
- Mai Treial (born 1952), politician
- Malle Treial (born 1945), actress
