= Heino Anto =

Estonian politician

Heino Anto (also Hindrik Anto; 13 October 1882 – 13 September 1955) was an Estonian politician, stage actor, playwright, theatre director, and journalist.

== Personal life ==
Anto was born in Rahuste village, Torgu Parish, Kreis Ösel (now Saaremaa Parish, Estonia) in 1882. He attended Kuressaare linnakool (German: Stadtschule in Arensburg) in 1893‒1898. In 1904 he married Maimu Anto. Since 1907 he worked as an actor and dramaturge in Estonia Theatre and later in the Estonian Drama Theatre. Anto died in 1955 in Tallinn.

== Political career ==
He was a member of the II Riigikogu, representing the National Liberal Party. He was a member of the Riigikogu since 5 June 1925. He replaced Peeter Lindau.
