= Kristjan Raudsepp =

Estonian politician

Kristjan Raudsepp (1880 – ?) was an Estonian politician. He was a member of II Riigikogu. He was a member of the Riigikogu since 22 November 1924, representing the Workers' United Front. He replaced Elise Priks.
