= Hans Tirusson =

Estonian politician

Hans Tirusson (1884 Tarvastu Parish (now Viljandi Parish), Kreis Fellin - ?) was an Estonian politician. He was a member of II Riigikogu. He was a member of the Riigikogu since 29 February 1924. He replaced Paul Keerdo. On 22 March 1924, he resigned his position and he was replaced by Peeter Palovere.
