= August Mühlberg =

Estonian politician

August Mühlberg (1888 Kabala Parish (now Türi Parish), Kreis Fellin – 1933) was an Estonian politician. He was a member of II Riigikogu. He was a member of the Riigikogu since 9 April 1924. He replaced Oskar Sepre. On 17 May 1924, he was removed from his position and he was replaced by Johannes Sillenberg.
