= Johann Põlenik =

Estonian politician

Johann Põlenik (1899 Pärnu - ?) was an Estonian politician. He was a member of II Riigikogu, representing the Workers' United Front. He was a member of the Riigikogu since 14 November 1924. He replaced Mihkel Pikkur. On 18 November 1924, he resigned his position and he was replaced by Juhan Maksim.
