= Crass (surname) =

Crass is a surname.

Notable people with the name include:

- Bill Crass (1911–1996), American football player
- Chris Crass (born c. 1973), American activist
- Derrick Crass (born 1960), American weightlifter
- Franz Crass (1928–2012), German singer

== See also ==
- Krass (surname)
