= Erna Visk =

Estonian-Soviet politician

Erna Visk (4 May 1910 – 20 April 1983) was an Estonian and Soviet politician.

Erna Visk was born in Pärnu. Her father was Workers' United Front politician Jüri Visk, who served in the II Riigikogu.

She was appointed Minister of Social Security of the Estonian SSR in 1958. Visk also served in the III Supreme Soviet of the Estonian Soviet Socialist Republic and the IV Supreme Council of the Estonian SSR.

She was buried in Tallinn's Forest Cemetery.
