= Johan Reichman =

Estonian politician

Johan Reichman (13 May 1879 Tarvastu Parish (now Viljandi Parish), Kreis Fellin – 5 March 1942 Sevurallag, Sverdlovsk Oblast, Russian SFSR) was an Estonian politician. He was a member of II Riigikogu. On 15 October 1923, he resigned his position and he was replaced by Jaan Soots.
