= August Vomm =

Estonian politician

August Vomm (13 May 1893 – 24 July 1941) was an Estonian politician. He was a member of II Riigikogu. He was a member of the Riigikogu since 31 March 1924. He replaced Peeter Treiberg.

Vom was born in Taevere Parish (now Põhja-Sakala Parish), Kreis Fellin. On 24 July 1941, he was executed by gunshot by Soviet authorities in Vastemõisa Parish in Viljandi County, aged 48. He was cremated and his ashes were buried in Suure-Jaani Cemetery on 3 December 1945.
