= August Voldemar Siiak =

Estonian politician

August Voldemar Siiak (7 February 1878 Vohnja Parish (now Kadrina Parish), Wierland County – ?) was an Estonian politician. He was a member of II Riigikogu, representing the Christian People's Party. He was a member of the Riigikogu since 23 March 1926. He replaced Konstantin Tamm-Stamm.
