= Ivan Seljugin =

Estonian politician

Ivan Seljugin (27 May 1886 Pskov Governorate, Russia – 1926) was an Estonian politician. He was a member of II Riigikogu.
