= Jaan Eigo =

Estonian politician (1866–1946)

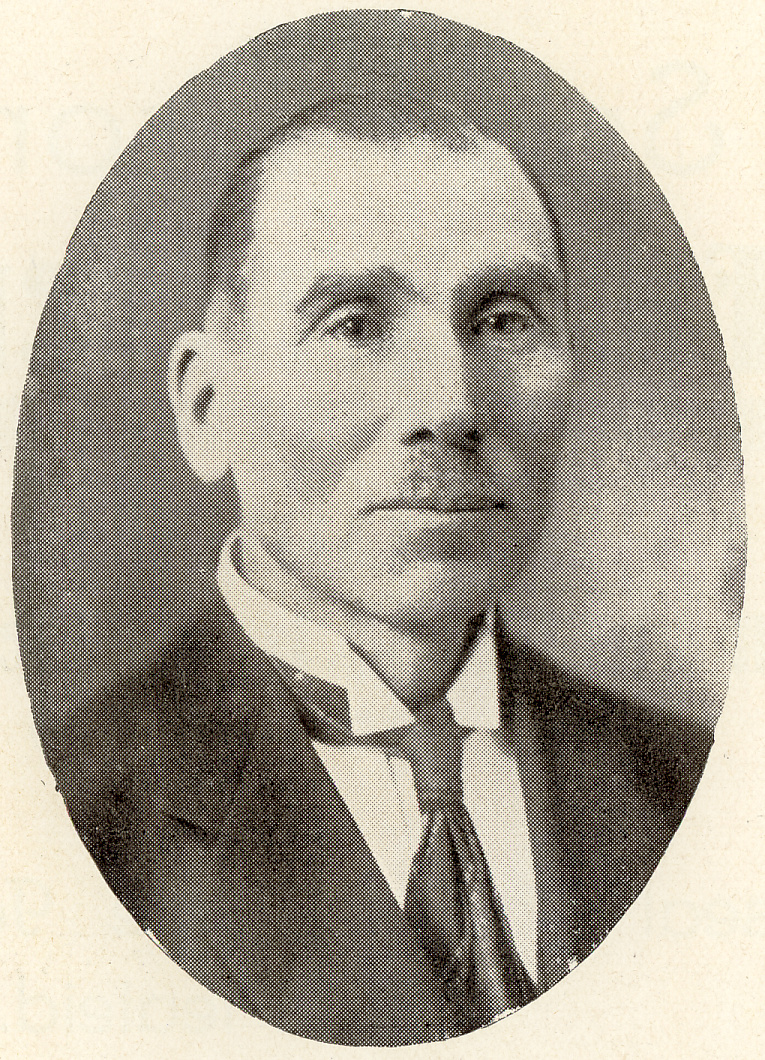
Jaan Eigo

Jaan Eigo (31 October 1866 Vana-Võidu Parish (now Viljandi Parish), Kreis Fellin – 30 October 1946 Viljandi) was an Estonian politician. He was a member of the I and II Riigikogu, representing the Farmers' Assemblies Party.
