= Aleksander Leopold Raudkepp =

Estonian politician (1877–1948)

Aleksander Leopold Raudkepp (16 March 1877 Ambla Parish (now Järva Parish), Kreis Jerwen – 1948 Germany) was an Estonian politician and Lutheran clergyman. He was a member of the I (where he replaced Eduard Kägu in 1922), II, III, IV, and V Riigikogu.

From 1923 to 1924, he was Second Assistant Chairman, and from 1925 to 1926, he served as First Assistant Secretary in the II Riigikogu.
