= Mihkel Janson =

Estonian politician

Mihkel Janson or Jaanson (29 July 1888 – ) was an Estonian politician from Viluvere Parish (now Põhja-Pärnumaa Parish), Kreis Pernau. He was a member of II Riigikogu. On 3 October 1925, he resigned his position and he was replaced by Alma Ostra-Oinas.
