= Jaan Tagel =

Estonian politician

Jaan Tagel (1886 Vastseliina Parish (now Võru Parish), Kreis Werro – ?) was an Estonian politician. He was a member of II Riigikogu. He was a member of the Riigikogu since 8 March 1924. He replaced Aleksander Reinson. On 22 March 1924, he resigned his position and he was replaced by Eduard Kingsepp.
