= Eduard Peterson =

Estonian politician

Eduard Peterson (1892–?) was an Estonian politician. He was a member of II Riigikogu. He was a member of the Riigikogu since 25 April 1924. He replaced Juhan Must.
