= Eduard Brok =

Estonian politician

Eduard Brok (also Eduard Brock; born 1880 Petserimaa) was an Estonian politician. He was a member of II Riigikogu. He was a member of the Riigikogu since 4 June 1924. He replaced Jaan Vaher.
