= Carl Schilling =

Estonian politician (1872–1941)

Carl Schilling (21 October 1872, Kalvi Parish (now Viru-Nigula Parish), Wierland County – 8 October 1941, Schweinfurt, Germany) was an Estonian politician. He was a member of II Riigikogu. He was a member of the Riigikogu from 7 June 1923. He replaced Johann Meier.
