= Krass (surname) =

Krass is a surname. Notable people with the surname include:

- Caroline D. Krass (born 1968), American attorney and government official
- Johannes Krass (1891–1989), Estonian politician
- Julia Krass (born 1997), American skier

== See also ==
- Kraš (surname)
