= Heinrich Bauer (politician) =

Estonian politician

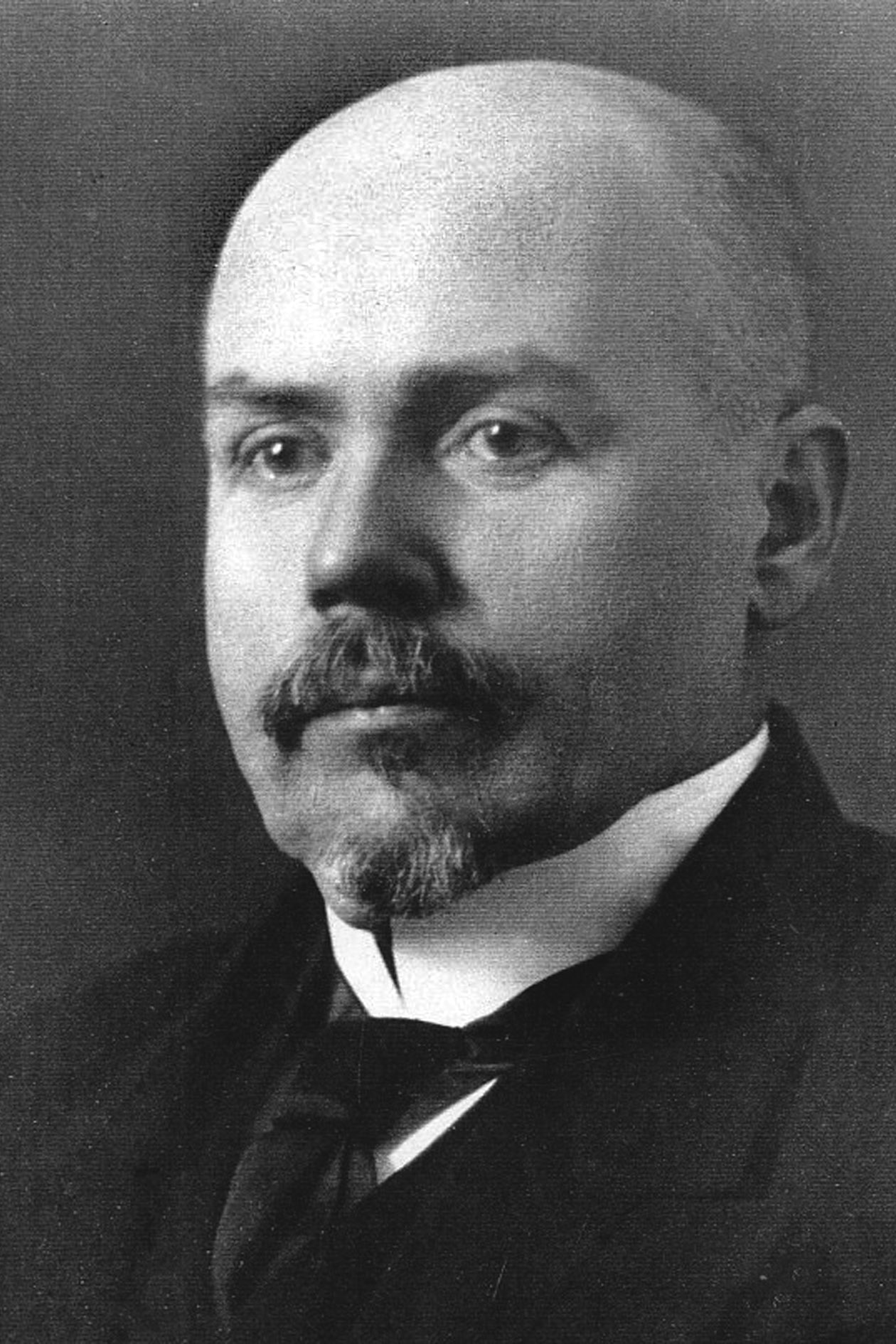
Heinrich Bauer

Heinrich Nikolai Bauer (11 August 1874 Paide – 11 October 1927 Tallinn) was an Estonian politician. He was a member of II Riigikogu.
