= Aleksander Metusala =

Estonian politician

Aleksander Metusala (born 15 February 1891) was an Estonian politician. He was a member of II Riigikogu. He was a member of the Riigikogu since 22 November 1924. He replaced Eduard Luts.
