= Eduard Parts =

Estonian politician

Eduard Parts (1899 Vana-Kariste Parish (now Mulgi Parish), Kreis Pernau – 1941) was an Estonian politician. He was a member of II Riigikogu. He was a member of the Riigikogu since 5 April 1924. He replaced Aleksander Erdman. On 17 May 1924, he was removed from his position and he was replaced by Johanna Andreesen.
