= Johannes-August Müürman =

Estonian politician (1894–1938)

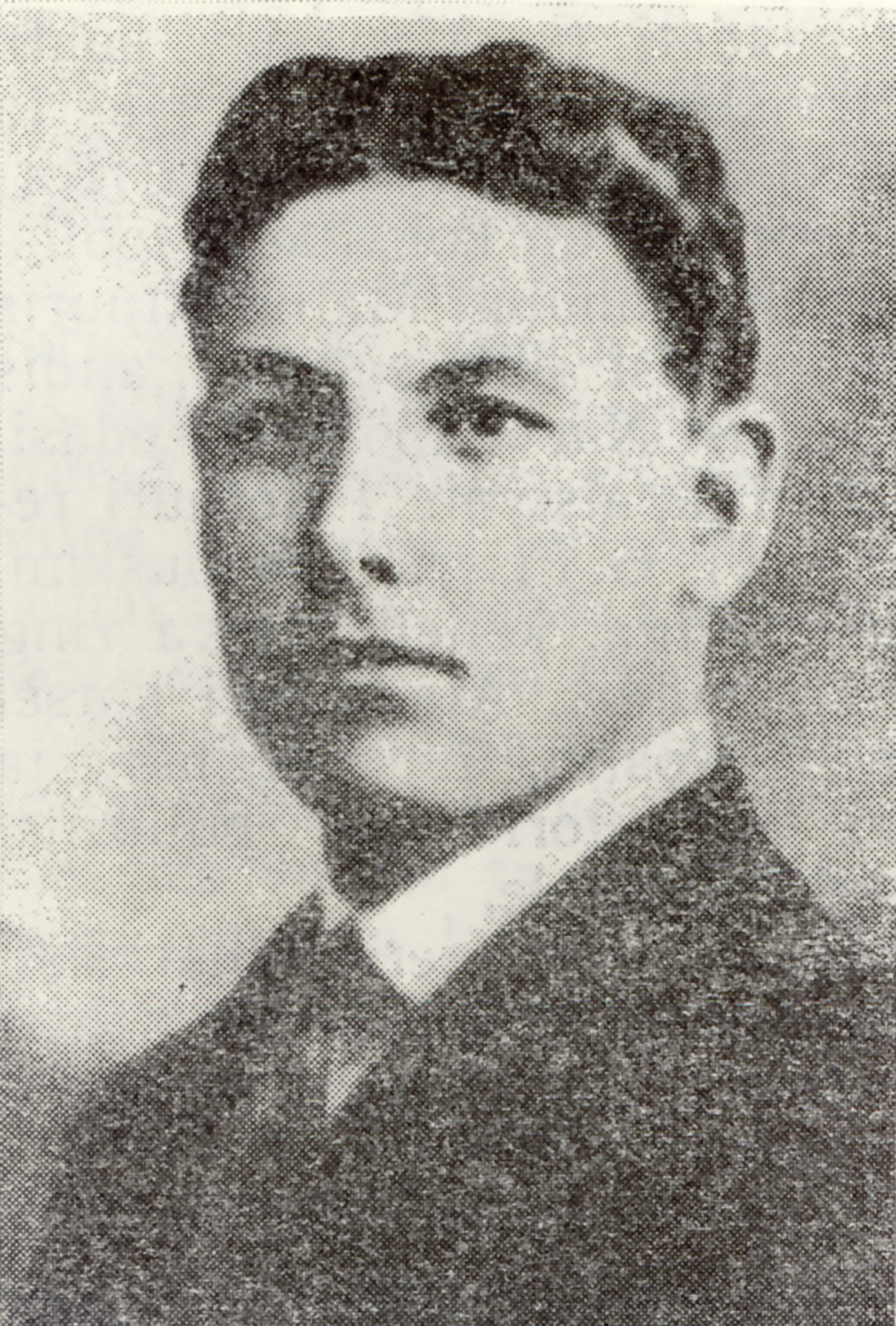
Johannes-August Müürman

Johannes-August Müürman (also Johannes-August Allikso, Russian: Иоган Янович Мюрман, romanized: Iogan Yanovich Myurman; 29 November 1894, Nikolai Parish (now Kose Parish), Kreis Harrien – 26 April 1938, Soviet Union) was an Estonian politician. He was a member of I Riigikogu. On 19 October 1921, he resigned his position and was subsequently replaced by Eduard Kägu.
