= Eduard Tiiman =

Estonian politician

Eduard Tiiman (1888 – ?) was an Estonian politician. He was a member of the II Riigikogu, beginning on 9 April 1924 when he replaced Adolf Zillmer. On 17 May, he was removed from his position and replaced by Rudolf Pächter.
