= Jaan Vain =

Estonian politician (1886–1942)

Jaan Vain (14 November 1886 Kõo Parish (now Põhja-Sakala Parish), Kreis Fellin – March 1942) was an Estonian lawyer and politician. He was a member of the I II III and V Riigikogu.

He was Second Assistant Secretary in II Riigikogu.
