= Georg Jürgenson =

Estonian politician

Georg Jürgenson (1898–?) was an Estonian politician. He was a member of II Riigikogu. He was a member of the Riigikogu since 22 November 1924. He replaced Aleksander Rimmel. On 18 December 1924, he was removed from his position and he was replaced by Jüri Kurul.
