= Arnold Ehrstein =

Estonian politician

Arnold Ehrstein (also Arnu Eeskivi; 6 February 1898 in Pärnu – 15 June 1946) was an Estonian politician. He was a member of II Riigikogu. He was a member of the Riigikogu since 31 December 1924. He replaced August Männikson.
