= Kristjan Saavo =

Estonian politician

Kristjan Saavo (1878, in Luunja Parish, Kreis Dorpat – ?) was an Estonian politician. He was a member of the II Riigikogu beginning on 17 May 1924, when he replaced Hugo Kaas.
