= Konstantin Tamm-Stamm =

Estonian politician

Konstantin Tamm-Stamm (14 May 1868 Kronstadt, Russia – 27 July 1937 Tartu) was an Estonian politician. He was a member of II Riigikogu. He was a member of the Riigikogu since 18 March 1926, representing the Christian People's Party. He replaced Aleksander Tenneberg. On 23 March 1926, he resigned his position and he was replaced by August Voldemar Siiak.
