= Jüri Kurul =

Estonian politician (1872–1937)

Jüri Kurul (15 March 1872 Tõstamaa Parish, Kreis Pernau – 5 July 1937 Tallinn) was an Estonian politician. He was a member of II Riigikogu. He was a member of the Riigikogu since 18 December 1924. He replaced Georg Jürgenson. On 29 May 1925, he was removed from his position and he was replaced by Aleksander Lensman.
