= Johannes Gutmann =

Estonian politician

Member of II Riigikogu
- In office 19 November 1923 – 5 October 1925
- Preceded by: Jaak Reichmann
- Succeeded by: Ernst Masik

Johannes Gutmann (?-?) was an Estonian politician. He was a member of II Riigikogu. He was a member of the Riigikogu since 19 November 1923. He replaced Jaak Reichmann. On 5 October 1925, he resigned his position and he was replaced by Ernst Masik.
