= Gustav Kroon =

Estonian politician

Gustav Kroon (1 June 1872 – 4 June 1942) was an Estonian politician. He was a member of II Riigikogu. He was a member of the Riigikogu since 25 July 1923. He replaced Jüri Uluots.
