= Aleksander Erdman =

Estonian politician

Aleksander Erkman (23 November 1894 Pärnu – 10 November 1975 Pärnu) was an Estonian politician. He was a member of II Riigikogu. He was a member of the Riigikogu since 29 February 1924. He replaced Vladimir Kangur. On 5 April 1924, he resigned his position and he was replaced by Eduard Parts.
