= Jüri Visk =

Estonian politician

Jüri Visk (1 January 1885 Halinga Parish (now Põhja-Pärnumaa Parish), Kreis Pernau – 30 August 1957 Sauga Selsoviet, Pärnu District) was an Estonian politician. He was a member of II Riigikogu, representing the Workers' United Front. He was a member of the Riigikogu since 24 September 1924. He replaced Boris Kumm. On 1 October 1924, he was removed from his position and he was replaced by Mihkel Pikkur.

Visk's daughter was politician Erna Visk.
