= Bernhard Eilman =

Estonian politician

Bernhard Eilman (born 23 August 1892 Kronstadt – 14 January 1965) was an Estonian politician. He was a member of II Riigikogu.
