= Theodor Tallmeister =

Estonian politician

Theodor Tallmeister (9 April 1889 Tartu – 3 February 1947 Uppsala) was an Estonian politician. He was a member of II Riigikogu.
