= Eduard Kingsepp =

Estonian politician

Eduard Kingsepp (4 March 1899 – 7 March 1929, in Tallinn) was an Estonian politician. He was a member of II Riigikogu. He was a member of the Riigikogu since 22 March 1924. He replaced Jaan Tagel. On 25 April 1924, he resigned his position and he was replaced by Aleksander Liiber.
