= Johannes-Heinrich Uibopuu =

Estonian politician

Johannes-Heinrich Uibopuu (29 January 1886 Vana-Antsla Parish (now Antsla Parish), Kreis Werro – 4 February 1986 Tallinn) was an Estonian politician. He was a member of II Riigikogu.
