= Kolkja =

Borough in Estonia

- Small borough
- Location in Estonia
- Coordinates: 58°33′1″N 27°13′0″E
- Country: Estonia
- County: Tartu County
- Municipality: Peipsiääre Parish

Population (2011 Census)
  - Total: 277

Kolkja is a small borough (Estonian: alevik) in Peipsiääre Parish, Tartu County, in southeastern Estonia. As of the 2011 census, the settlement's population was 277.

The Old Believers Museum and the Chicory Museum are located in Kolkja. There are traditional clothes, handicrafts, tools, photos, books and many other items of the Old Believers in the Old Believers museum.

== Notable people ==
- Peeter Baranin (1882–1966), politician

== Gallery ==
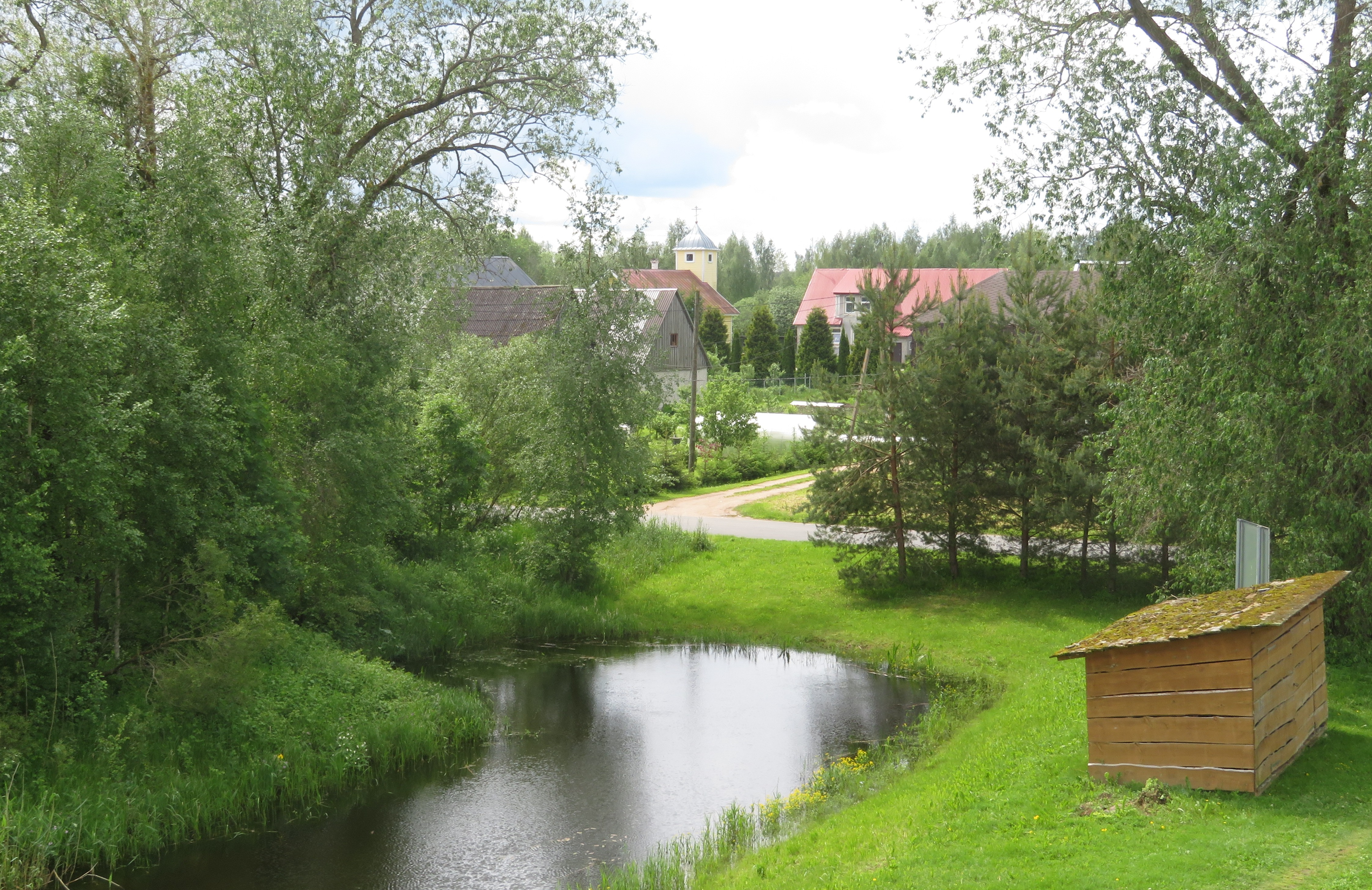
Village centre of Kolkja

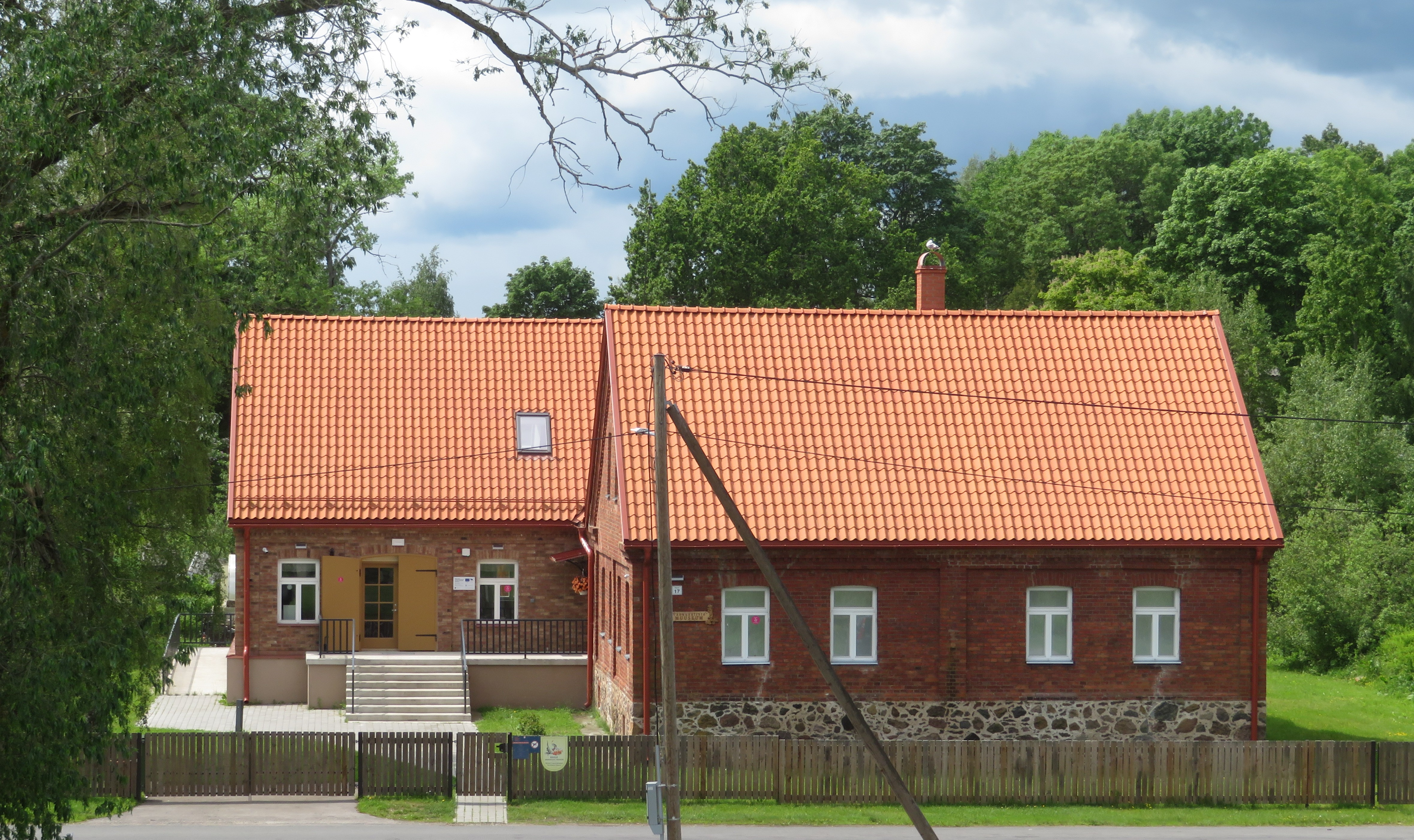
Kolkja museum of Old Believers and Cultural Centre

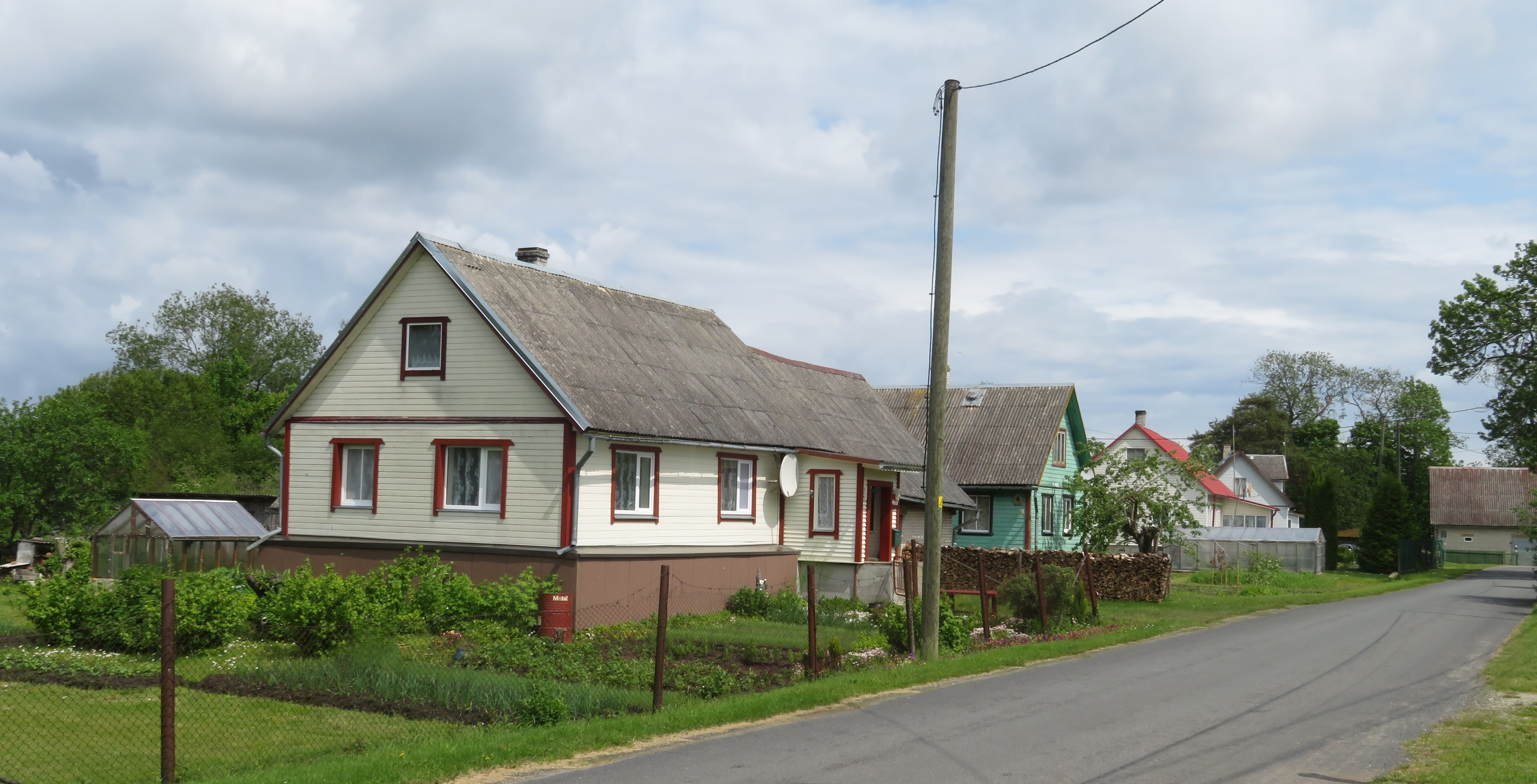
Main Street in Kolkja (2025)

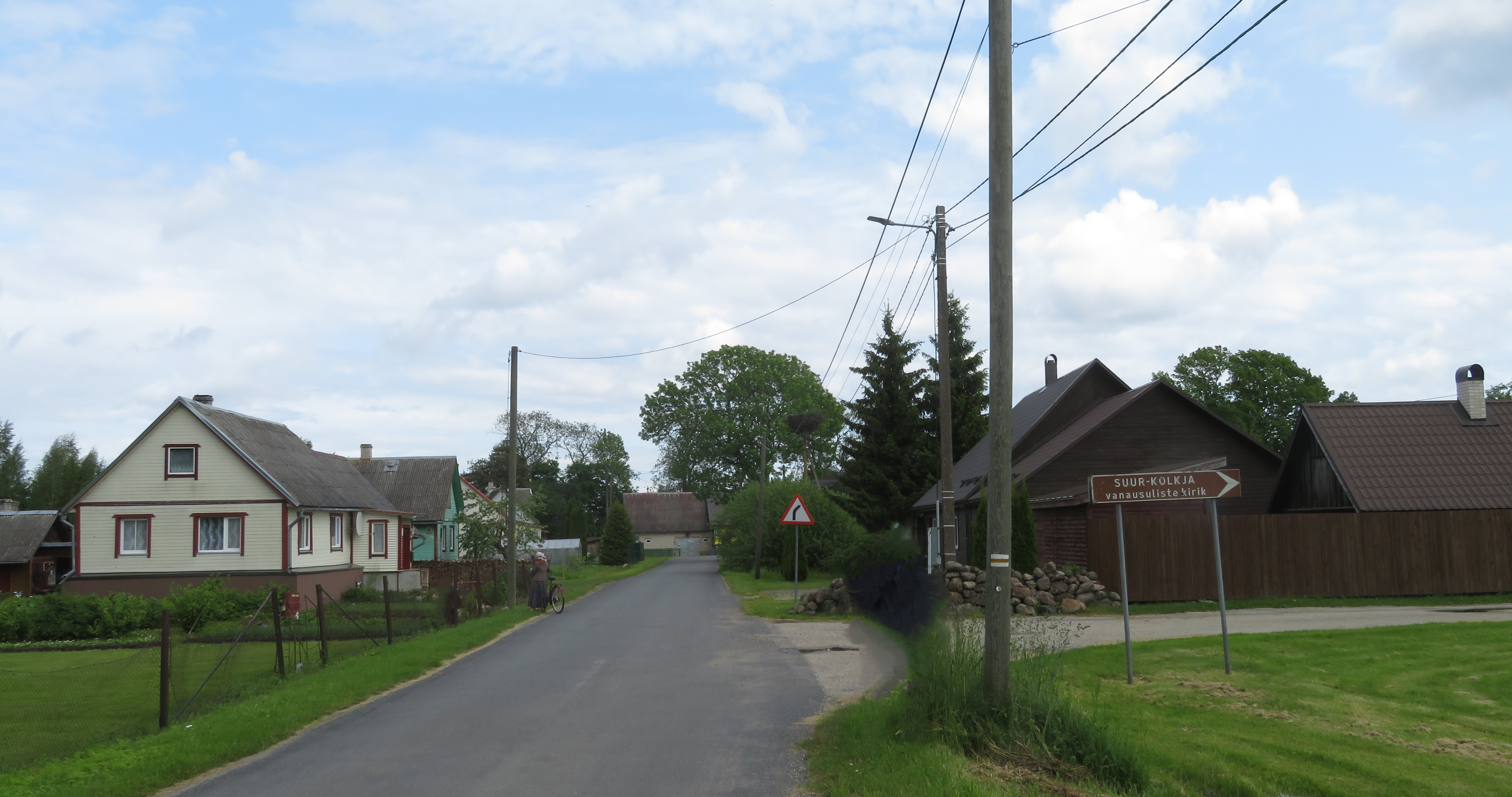
Main Street in Kolkja (2025)

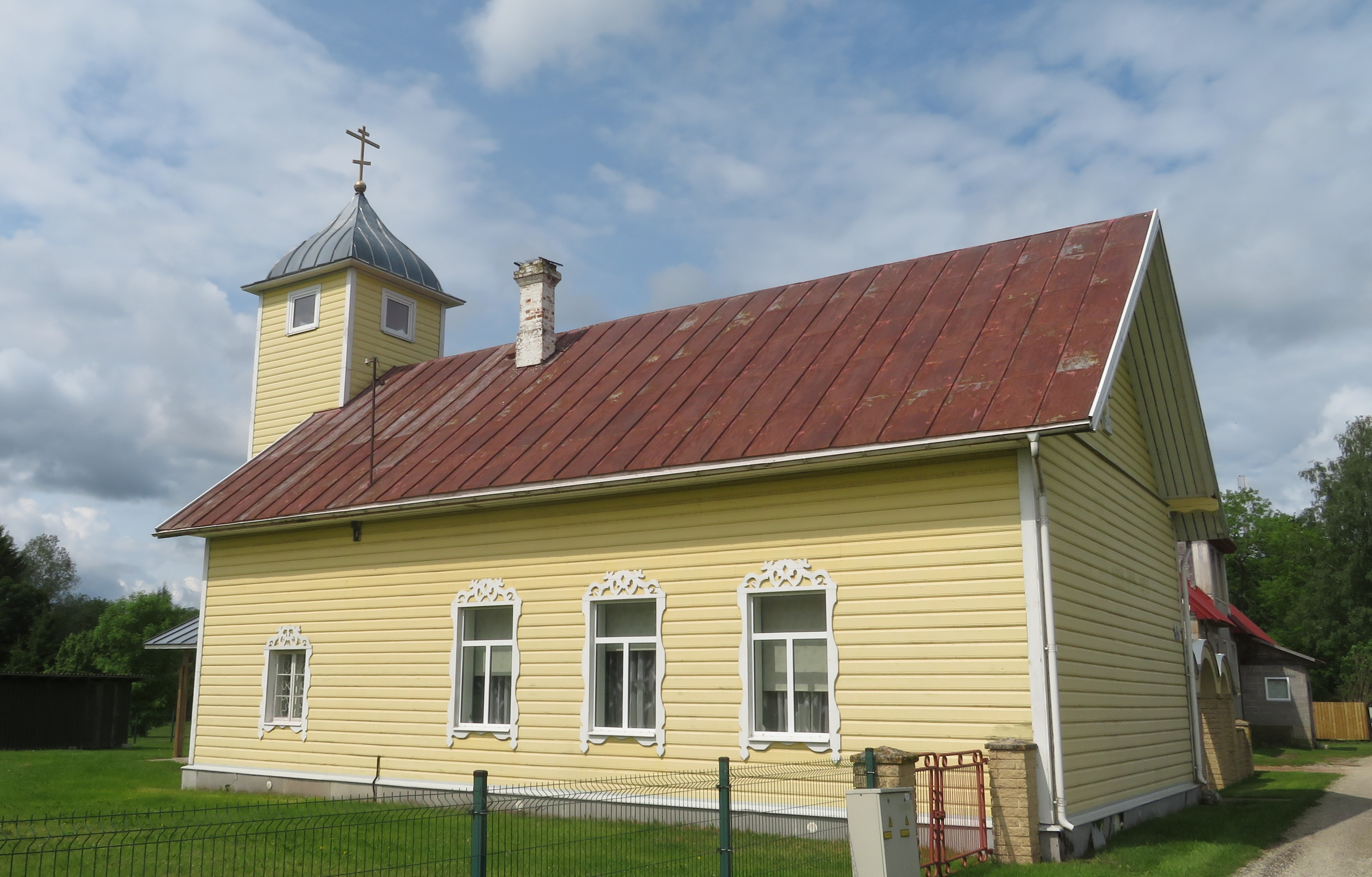
Old-Believers' Church in Kolkja

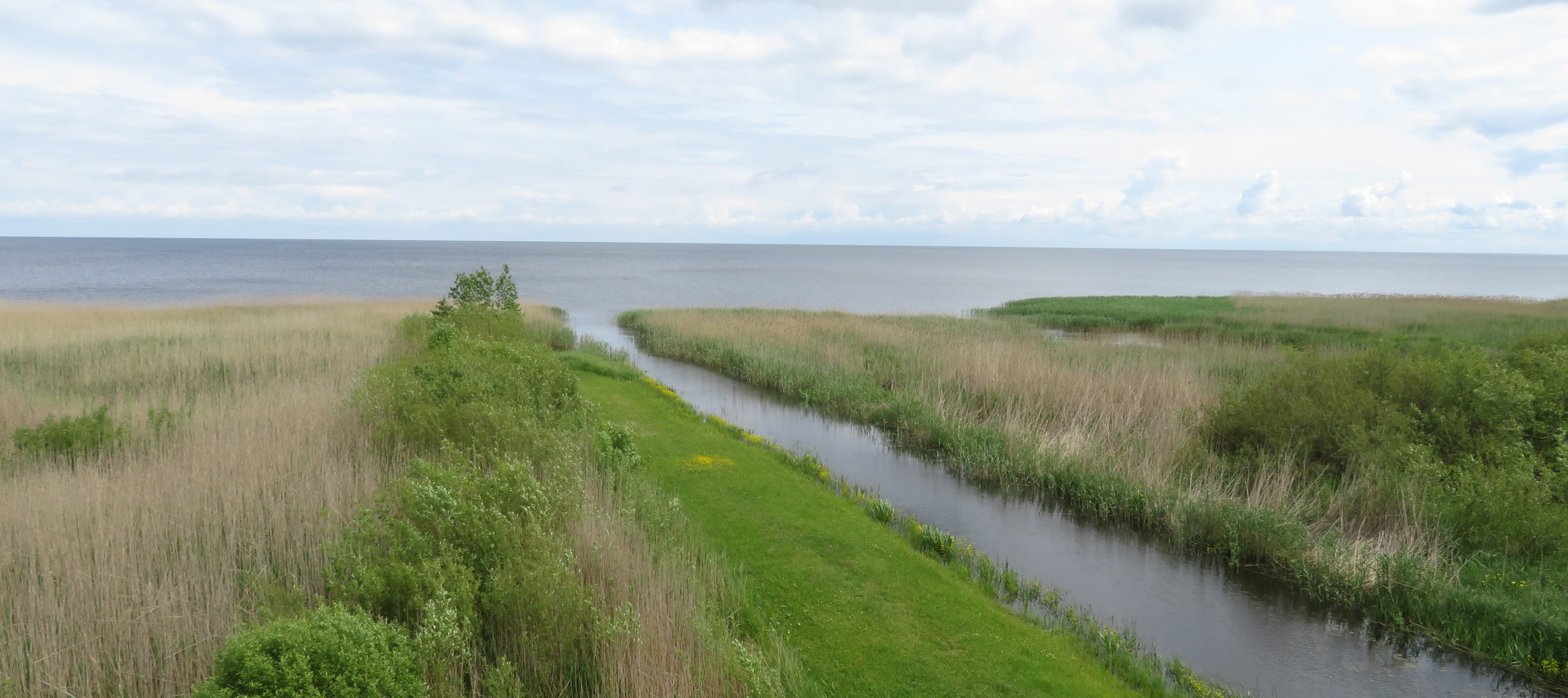
Canal from Kolkja to Lake Peipsi Järv

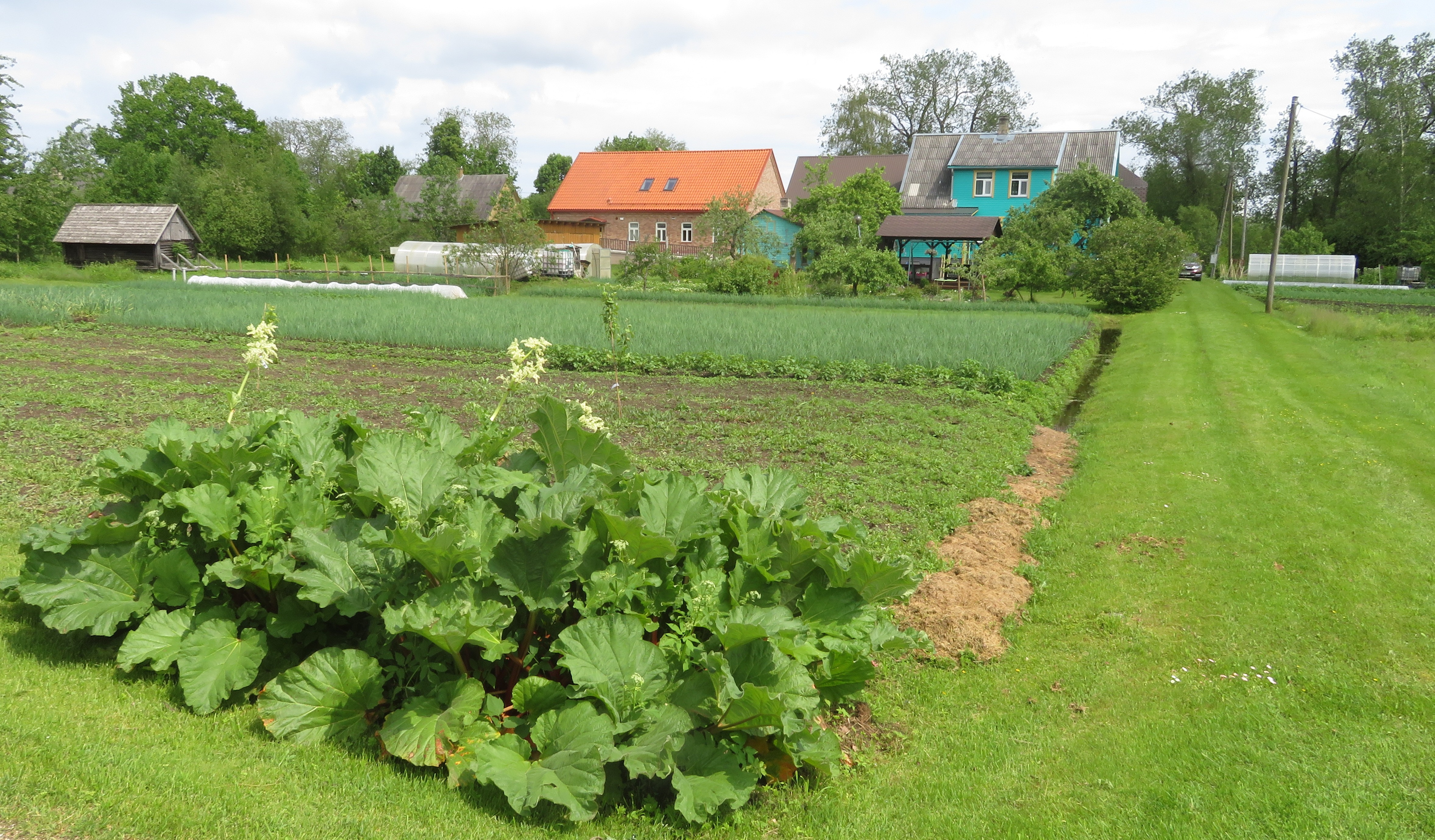
Cultivation of vegetables in Kolkja

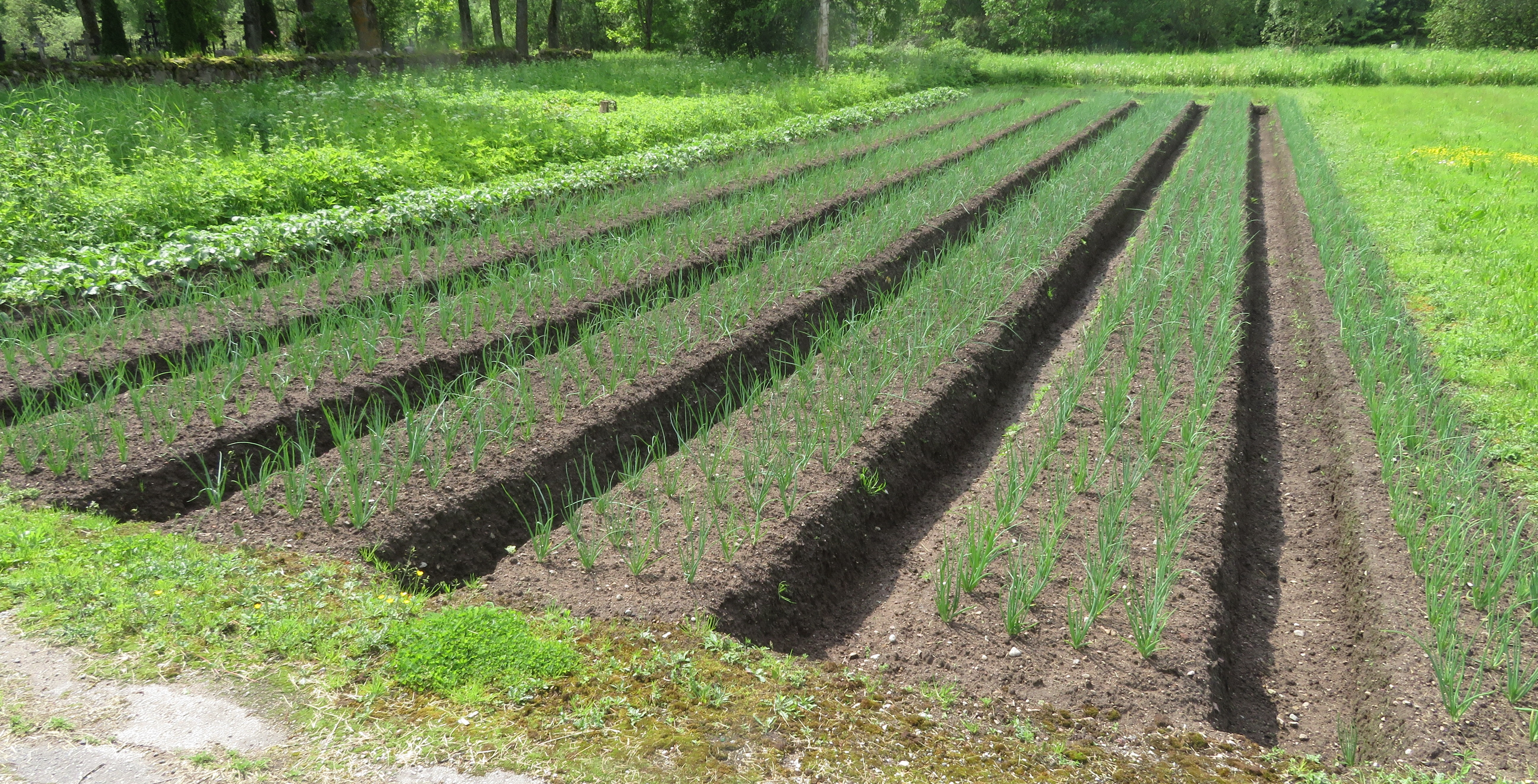
Regular onion fields in Kolkja

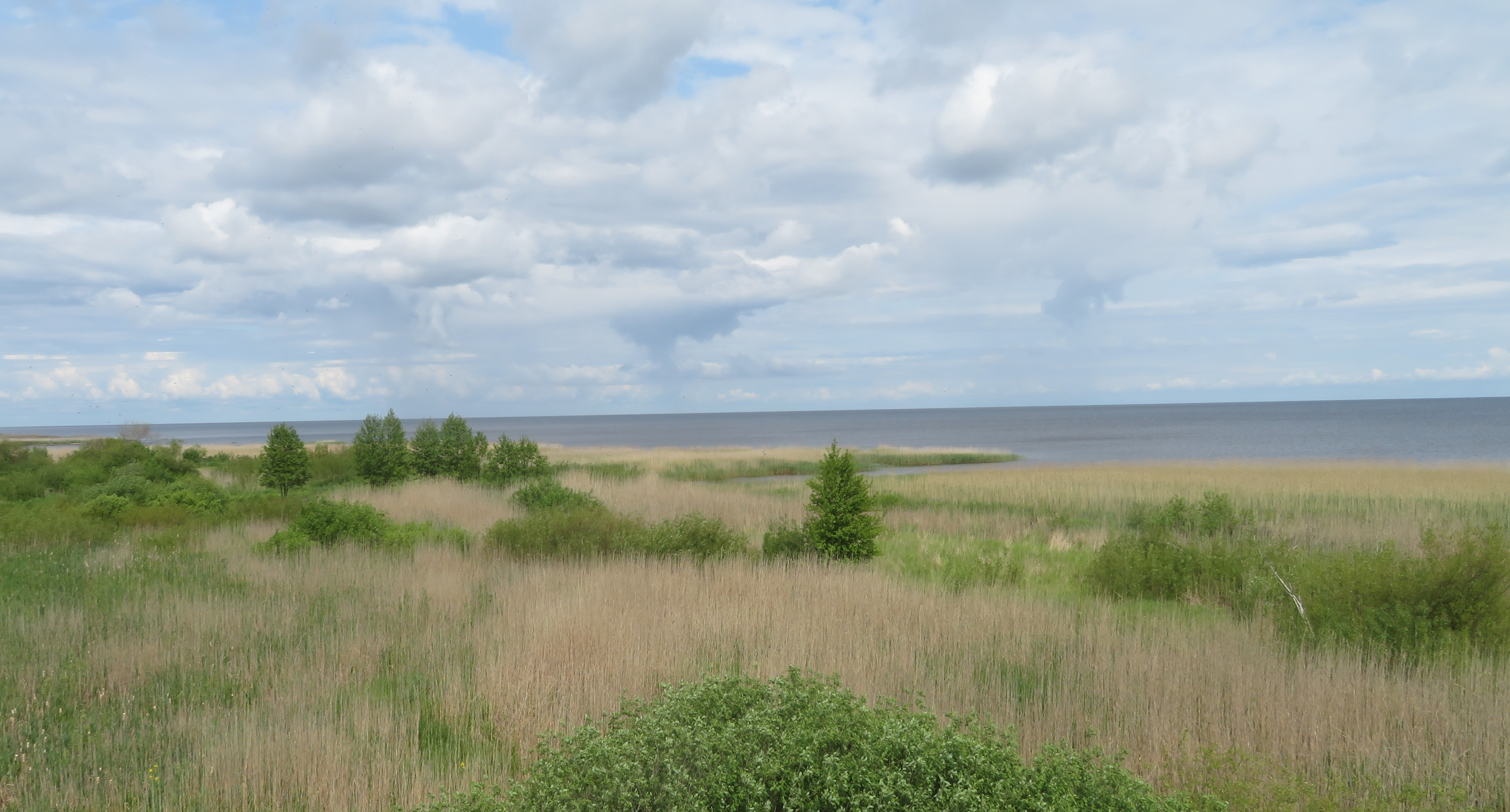
Lake Peipsi Järv near Kolkja
