= Peeter Michelson =

Estonian politician

Peeter Michelson (1891 Kirepi Parish (now Elva Parish), Kreis Dorpat – ?) was an Estonian politician. He was a member of II Riigikogu. He was a member of the Riigikogu since 22 March 1924. He replaced Mihkel Laar. On 9 April 1924 he was removed from his position and he was replaced by Hugo Kaas.
