= Mihkel Laar =

Estonian politician

Mihkel Laar (30 September 1882 – ) was an Estonian politician. He was a member of II Riigikogu. He was a member of the Riigikogu since 8 March 1924. He replaced Jaan Miger. On 22 March 1924, he resigned his position and he was replaced by Peeter Michelson.
