= Aleksander Tamm =

Estonian politician

Aleksander Tamm (5 March 1868 Tallinn – 3 August 1950 Tallinn) was an Estonian politician. He was a member of II Riigikogu.
