= Peeter Jakobson (politician) =

Estonian politician

Peeter Jakobson (23 November 1878 – 1954) was an Estonian politician. He was a member of the II Riigikogu from 1 October 1924 until 14 September 1925, when he was removed from his position. He replaced Paul Tamm and was succeeded by Mihkel Neps.
