= Axel de Vries =

Baltic German journalist and politician

Axel de Vries (4 June 1892 Preedi Manor (now Järva Parish), Kreis Jerwen – 24 January 1963 Bonn, West Germany) was a Baltic-German and German politician. He was a member of II Riigikogu. He was a member of the Riigikogu since 9 April 1924. He replaced Gerhard Kress.

After WW II, he was a member of the Bundestag.
