= Peeter Järve =

Estonian politician

Peeter Järve (11 March 1874 Laatre Parish (now Mulgi Parish), Kreis Wolmar – 20 June 1936 Laatre Parish, Valga County) was an Estonian politician. He was a member of II Riigikogu. He was a member of the Riigikogu since 24 April 1925. He replaced Jaan Nuut.
