= Rudolf Pächter =

Estonian politician

Rudolf Pächter (also Rudolf Pehtla; 27 August 1883 – 22 July 1941) was an Estonian politician. He was a member of the II Riigikogu, serving since 17 May 1924. He replaced Eduard Tiiman. On 26 May 1924, he resigned his position and he was replaced by Andres Nõmme.
