= Jaan Velt =

Estonian politician

Jaan Velt (26 February 1898 Kaarli Parish (now Mulgi Parish), Kreis Pernau – 24 April 1925 Tallinn) was an Estonian politician, communist. He was a member of II Riigikogu. He was a member of the Riigikogu since 20 May 1924. He replaced Jaan Rea. On 29 January 1925, he was removed from his position and he was replaced by Peeter Lindau.

In 1925 he was executed because he took part of 1924 Estonian coup d'état attempt.
