= August Männikson =

Estonian politician (1889-?)

August Männikson (1889–?) was an Estonian politician. He was a member of II Riigikogu. He was a member of the Riigikogu since 20 December 1924. He replaced Juhan Maksim. On 31 December 1924, he resigned his position and he was replaced by Arnold Ehrstein.
