= Jaan Teetsov =

Estonian politician (1884–1942)

Jaan Teetsov (20 February 1884 Penuja Parish (now Mulgi Parish), Kreis Pernau – 8 February 1942 Sverdlovsk Oblast, Russia) was an Estonian politician. He was a member of II Riigikogu.
