= Peeter Palovere =

Estonian politician

Peeter Palovere (1872–?) was an Estonian politician. He was a member of II Riigikogu. He was a member of the Riigikogu since 22 March 1924. He replaced Hans Tirusson. On 12 April 1924, he resigned his position and he was replaced by Juhan Must.
