= Hindrik Ostrat =

Estonian politician

Hindrik Ostrat (21 May 1871 Kudina Parish (now Jõgeva Parish), Kreis Dorpat – 1940) was an Estonian politician. He was a member of II Riigikogu.
