= Elise Priks =

Estonian politician

Elise Priks (also Liisa Priks; 9 January 1890 Laeva Parish (now Tartu Parish), Kreis Dorpat – 14 November 1943 Moscow) was an Estonian politician. She was a member of II Riigikogu. She was a member of the Riigikogu since 26 June 1924. She replaced Gustav Lange. On 22 November 1924, she was removed from her position and she was replaced by Kristjan Raudsepp.

Priks was one of the suspects in one of the largest political trials in the history of Estonia, the so-called trial of the 149, which lasted the whole year of 1924. As a result of the process, the Workers' Front was declared an armed organization against the state, and members of the party were punished for belonging to the party and plotting a coup. The court sentenced Priks to 15 years of forced labor. She was released under the Amnesty Act of 1938.
