= Mihkel Pikkur =

Estonian politician

Mihkel Pikkur (also Mihkel Pikkor; 13 March 1896 – 6 January 1943) was an Estonian politician. He was a member of II Riigikogu. He was a member of the Riigikogu since 1 October 1924. He replaced Jüri Visk. On 14 November 1924, he was removed from his position and he was replaced by Johann Põlenik.
