= Peeter Lindau =

Estonian politician

Peeter Lindau (3 October 1886 Kaisma Parish (now Põhja-Pärnumaa Parish), Kreis Pernau – ?) was an Estonian politician. He was a member of II Riigikogu. He was a member of the Riigikogu since 29 January 1925. He replaced Jaan Velt. On 5 June 1925, he resigned his position and he was replaced by Hindrik Anto.
