= Johanna Andreesen =

Estonian politician

Johanna Andreesen (also Johanna Andresen; 1885–1966) was an Estonian politician. She was a member of II Riigikogu. She was a member of the Riigikogu since 17 May 1924. She replaced Eduard Parts. On 4 June 1924, she resigned his position and she was replaced by Aleksander Rimmel.
