= Eduard Kink =

Estonian politician (1895–1942)

Member of the Riigikogu
- In office July 1, 1926 – 1932
- Preceded by: Alma Ostra-Oinas

Personal details
- Born: November 8, 1895 Vana-Kariste Parish, Russian Empire
- Died: January 13, 1942 (aged 46) Solikamsk, Soviet Union
- Party: Estonian Socialist Workers' Party

Eduard Kink (8 November 1895 in Vana-Kariste Parish (now Mulgi Parish), Kreis Pernau – 13 January 1942 in Solikamsk, Russian SFSR) was an Estonian politician. He was a member of the III and IV Riigikogu, representing the Estonian Socialist Workers' Party. He became a member of the Riigikogu on 1 July 1926 when he replaced Alma Ostra-Oinas.
