= Martin Krusemann =

Estonian politician (1883–1957)

Martin Krusemann (also Martin Kruusemann or Martin Kruusimaa; 10 November 1883 Sindi, Kreis Pernau – 1957 Baltimore, United States) was an Estonian politician. He was a member of II Riigikogu, representing the Farmers' Assemblies. He was a member of the Riigikogu since 7 October 1925. He replaced Aleksander Lensman. On 7 November 1925, he resigned his position and he was replaced by Johann Ploompuu.
