= Gustav Lange (politician) =

Estonian politician

Gustav Lange (1863–1940) was an Estonian politician. He was a member of II Riigikogu. He was a member of the Riigikogu since 4 June 1924. He replaced Johannes Sillenberg. On 26 June 1924, he was removed from his position and he was replaced by Elise Priks.
