= Andres Nõmme =

Estonian politician

Andres Nõmme (30 March 1864 Torma Parish (now Jõgeva Parish), Kreis Dorpat – 27 April 1935 Mustvee) was an Estonian politician. He was a member of II Riigikogu. He was a member of the Riigikogu since 26 May 1924. He replaced Rudolf Pächter. On 26 June 1924, he was removed from his position and he was replaced by Paul Tamm.
