= Aleksander Liiber =

Estonian politician

Aleksander Liiber (1884 Sõmerpalu Parish (now Võru Parish), Kreis Werro – ?) was an Estonian politician. He was a member of II Riigikogu. He became a member of the Riigikogu on 25 April 1924. He replaced Eduard Kingsepp. On 17 May 1924, he was removed from his position and replaced by Jaan Vaher.
