= Juhan Must =

Estonian politician

Juhan Must (1862 Sangaste Parish (now Otepää Parish), Kreis Dorpat – ?) was an Estonian politician. He was a member of II Riigikogu. He was a member of the Riigikogu since 12 April 1924. He replaced Peeter Palovere. On 25 April 1924, he resigned his position and he was replaced by Eduard Peterson.
