= Jaan Nuut =

Estonian politician (born 1874)

Jaan Nuut (born 1874 in Tori Parish, Kreis Pernau) was an Estonian politician. He was a member of II Riigikogu. He was a member of the Riigikogu since 24 November 1924. He replaced Hans Mitt. On 24 April 1925, he resigned his position and he was replaced by Peeter Järve.
