= Aleksander Lensman =

Estonian politician

Aleksander Lensman (also Aleksander Lensmann or Aleksander Leitmäe; 1890 Järvakandi Parish (now Kehtna Parish), Harrien County – ?) was an Estonian politician. He was a member of II Riigikogu. He was a member of the Riigikogu since 29 April 1925. He replaced Jüri Kurul. On 7 October 1925, he resigned his position and he was replaced by Martin Kruusemann.
