= Juhan Maksim =

Estonian politician

Juhan Maksim (19 December 1886 – 12 July 1941, Viljandi) was an Estonian politician. He was a member of II Riigikogu. He was a member of the Riigikogu on 18 November 1924. He replaced Johann Põlenik. On 20 December 1924, he was removed from his position and he was replaced by August Männikson. On 12 July 1941, shortly after the Wehrmacht had advanced into southern Estonia, Maksim was executed in Viljandi by the German occupation authorities.
