= Aleksander Tenneberg =

Estonian politician

Aleksander Tenneberg (17 November 1879 Rakvere Parish, Kreis Wierland – ?) was an Estonian politician. He was a member of II Riigikogu. He was a member of the Riigikogu since 13 March 1926, representing the Christian People's Party. He replaced Jaan Lattik. On 18 March 1926, he resigned his position and he was replaced by Konstantin Tamm-Stamm.
