= Juhan Albert Luur =

Estonian politician (1883–1937)

Juhan Albert Luur (26 May 1883, Sindi – 4 September 1937, Tartu) was an Estonian politician. He was a member of II Riigikogu.
