= Paul Tamm =

Estonian politician

Paul Tamm (10 September 1900 Avinurme Parish (now Mustvee Parish), Kreis Dorpat – 1944) was an Estonian politician. He was a member of II Riigikogu. He was a member of the Riigikogu since 26 June 1924. He replaced Andres Nõmme. On 1 October 1924, he resigned his position and he was replaced by Peeter Jakobson.
