= Jüri Voiman =

Estonian politician

Jüri Voiman (22 May 1896 in Vaimastvere Parish (now Jõgeva Parish), Kreis Dorpat – 26 May 1942 in Kirov, Russian SFSR) was an Estonian politician. He was a member of II Riigikogu.
