= Karl Tamm =

Estonian politician

Karl Tamm (26 August 1872 Vaimastvere Parish (now Jõgeva Parish), Kreis Dorpat – 22 May 1940 Uus-Auvere Parish, Virumaa) was an Estonian politician. He was a member of II Riigikogu.
