= Aleksander Rimmel =

Estonian politician

Aleksander Rimmel (1888 Võlla Parish (now Tori Parish), Kreis Pernau – ?) was an Estonian politician. He was a member of II Riigikogu. He was a member of the Riigikogu since 5 June 1924. He replaced Johanna Andreesen. On 22 November 1924, he was removed from his position and he was replaced by Georg Jürgenson.
