= Roland Kütt =

Estonian association footballer

Roland Kütt (born 22 April 1987) is an Estonian former footballer who last played as a goalkeeper for Kuressaare.

== Early life ==
Kütt is a native of Saaremaa, Estonia and started playing football at a young age.

== Club career ==
Kütt started his career with Estonian side Kuressaare, where he debuted for the club on 1 May 2005 against Flora and went on to make 195 league appearances and scored 0 goals for them. While playing for the club, he was given the opportunity to train in England with Estonia international Mart Poom, who was playing in England at the time. In 2012, he signed for Australian side Port Darwin FC, helping the club win the league, their first league title, before signing for Australian side Palm Beach SC on the recommendation of Estonian footballer and manager Ken Müür. After that, he returned to Estonian side Kuressaare. In 2020, he played a league game for the club as a field player. He initially retired from professional football the previous year.

== International career ==
Kütt played for the Saaremaa official football team.

== Managerial career ==
Kütt has worked as manager of the youth academy of Estonian side Kuressaare and as goalkeeper coach for the Estonia national under-16 football team, where he met with his players once to twice per month. After that, he was appointed manager of the women's team of Estonian side Kuressaare.

== Post-playing career ==
After retiring from professional football, Kütt worked as a physical education teacher.

== Personal life ==
Kütt has been married and has children. He has a brother.
