= Georg Rudolf Stackelberg =

Estonian politician (1872–1934)

Georg Rudolf (von) Stackelberg (12 October 1872 Salla Parish (now Väike-Maarja Parish), Kreis Wierland - 15 March 1934 Küti Parish, Virumaa) was an Estonian politician. He was a member of Estonian Constituent Assembly. He was a member of the assembly since 27 January 1920. He replaced Johannes Meier.
