= Alma Ostra-Oinas =

Estonian politician, journalist (1886–1960)

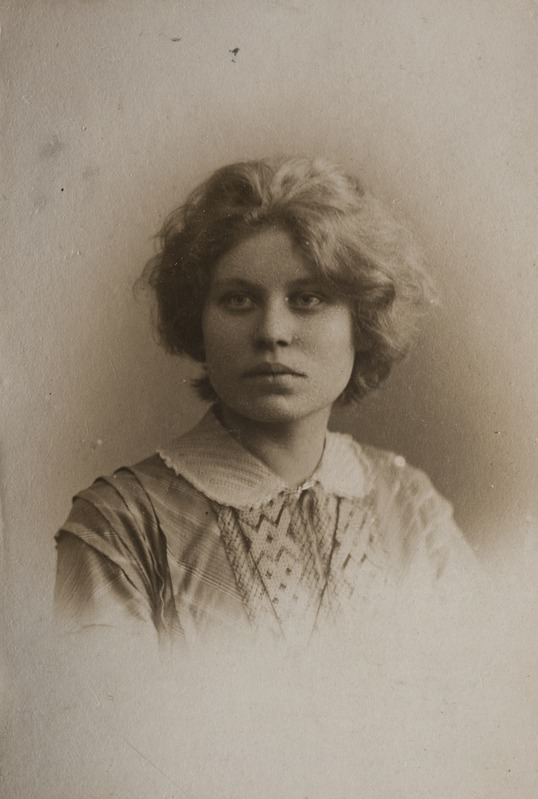
- Born: 16 September 1886; Vastse-Kuuste Parish
- Died: 2 November 1960 (aged 74); Inta, Komi ASSR
- Occupations: journalist, writer, politician
- Spouse: Aleksander Oinas

Alma Rosalie Ostra-Oinas (born Alma Ostra, also known as Alma Anvelt-Ostra; 4 or 16 September 1886 – 2 November 1960) was an Estonian journalist, writer and politician.

== Early life and education ==
Born in the village of Vastse-Kuuste on 4 or 16 September 1886, Ostra completed her elementary education at Schwarz Elementary School between 1893 and 1898, after which she began studying at G. Faure's dairy. She then attended Pushkin Girls' Gymnasium at Tartu between 1901 and 1905 and became active in underground radical-national politics, joining the Russian Social Democratic Party in 1903, working on its inter-school organisation and attending speeches by Russian socialists.

== Politics, family and later life ==
She was forced to leave school in 1905 over her involvement in radical politics and moved to Riga, where she was arrested by the Russia authorities for her involvement in an illegal printing press, and was eventually sent to Siberia, escaping imprisonment in 1906 and attending the Russian Social Democratic Party Congress in London in 1907. In 1909, she married the communist Jaan Anvelt so she could assume a different legal name, and between 1910 and 1915 she studied mathematics and philosophy in the Bestuzhev Courses at St Petersburg, also marrying the politician Aleksander Oinas in 1914.

She then settled in the Estonian town of Võnnu where, between 1916 and 1917, she was a director of Severopomoštš, and in 1917 she moved was elected a member of the Council of Workers and Soldiers, also editing the newspaper Social Democrat (Sotsiaaldemokraadi toimetus) between 1917 and 1918. She was a city councillor for Tallinn and Tartu, being among the first women to be a city councillor in Estonia, and joined the Estonian Provincial Assembly on 20 November 1918, replacing Jaan Treial; she was also a member of the Asutav Kogu (Constituent Assembly) between 1919 and 1920, and was elected to the first legislature of the Riigikogu (Estonian parliament), in 1920, serving until the end of the session. In the second legislature, she replaced Mihkel Janson on 3 October 1925 and sat until the end of the session. She was elected to the third legislature when convened in 1926, but stepped down on 1 July in that year, and was replaced by Eduard Kink. Throughout, she sat as a member of the Estonian Social Democratic Workers' Party (ESDTP). Her work in the Riigikogu included introducing a bill concerning family law, which was not passed but influenced subsequent legislation. Ostra-Oinas remained active as a journalist; she was editor of Ametiühisusline kuukiri (1923–27), and also returned to studies, initially in medicine but from 1921 to 1929 studied law at the University of Tartu. She also received the second class of the Order of the Estonian Red Cross, in 1929.

Ostra-Oinas's husband Aleksander was arrested by the Soviet authorities and sent to a prison camp in Siberia, where he died in 1942. Ostra-Oinas herself was arrested during the Second World War, firstly by the occupying Germans and then in 1944 by the Soviets; she was sentenced to five years' imprisonment and deportation, and died in 1960 in Inta, in the Komi Autonomous Soviet Socialist Republic of the USSR.

Aside from her contributions to Estonian politics, Ostra-Oinas is remembered as one of the first women politicians in Estonia, having been one of only a small number to serve in its first legislative chambers.
