= Peeter Baranin =

Estonian politician

- Born: 31 January 1882; Kolkja, Governorate of Livonia, Russian Empire
- Died: 11 April 1966 (aged 84); Tallinn, then part of Estonian SSR, Soviet Union
- Resting place: Metsakalmistu
- Education: Studied at Tartu Reaalkool
- Occupation: Politician
- Known for: Mayor of Mustvee, Chairman of the gentry board, Member of the Riigikogu

Peeter Baranin (or Pjotr Baranin; 31 January 1882, Kolkja – 11 April 1966, Tallinn) was an Estonian politician.

Baranin studied at Tartu Reaalkool. He was a firefighter. He was also the mayor of Mustvee and the chairman of the gentry board. He was a member of the Riigikogu from 1923 to 1929.

He was chairman of the Kolkja branch of Old Believers until 1914. He had established a new Old Believer church in Kolkja in 1928.

Baranin died on 11 April 1966 in Tallinn and was buried on 13 April 1966 at Metsakalmistu.
