= Johannes Krass =

Estonian politician

Johannes Krass (11 October 1891 – 17 November 1989 Tartu) was an Estonian politician. He was a member of II Riigikogu. He was a member of the Riigikogu since 19 August 1924. He replaced Alfred Kütt.
