= Jaan Treial =

Estonian politician (1896–1918)

Jaan Treial (31 January 1896 Vara, Kreis Dorpat – 11 January 1918) was an Estonian politician. He was a member of Estonian Provincial Assembly. When he died, his position in the assembly was replaced by Alma Ostra-Oinas.
