= Kraš (surname) =

Kraš is a surname. Notable people with the surname include:

- Josip Kraš (1900–1941), Croatian communist and People's Hero of Yugoslavia
- Ana Kraš (born 1984), Serbian-American designer and photographer

== See also ==
- Krass (surname)
