= Mats Laarman =

Estonian politician (1873–1964)

Mats Laarman (also Mats Laarmann; 8 February 1873 Kaarli Parish (now Mulgi Parish), Kreis Pernau – 13 December 1964 Abja Selsoviet, Viljandi Raion) was an Estonian politician. He was a member of II Riigikogu.
