= Gerhard Kress =

Estonian politician

Gerhard Kress (14 February 1894 Tallinn – 24 June 1939 Tallinn) was an Estonian politician. He was a member of II Riigikogu. He was a member of the Riigikogu since 29 September 1923. He replaced Max Bock. On 9 April 1924, he resigned his position and he was replaced by Axel de Vries.
