= Ernst Constantin Veberman =

Estonian politician

Ernst Constantin Veberman (also Weberman(n); 14 March 1885 Haljala Parish, Wierland County – 21 December 1940 Tallinn) was an Estonian politician. He was a member of the II Riigikogu, representing the National Liberal Party.

1925–26 he was Minister of Commerce and Industry. In 1940 he was arrested by the NKVD. He committed suicide while under arrest.
