= Hermann Georg Willibald Koch =

Estonian politician (1882–1957)

Hermann Georg Willibald Koch (2 April 1882 Võru – 29 March 1957 Lüdersfeld, West Germany) was an Estonian politician. He was a member of I Riigikogu.

From 1918 to 1919 he was Minister of German-minority Affairs.
