= 1920 Estonian parliamentary election =

1920 elections in Estonia

- 29 November 1920

100 seats in the Riigikogu 51 seats needed for a majority
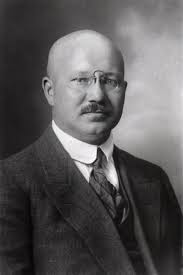

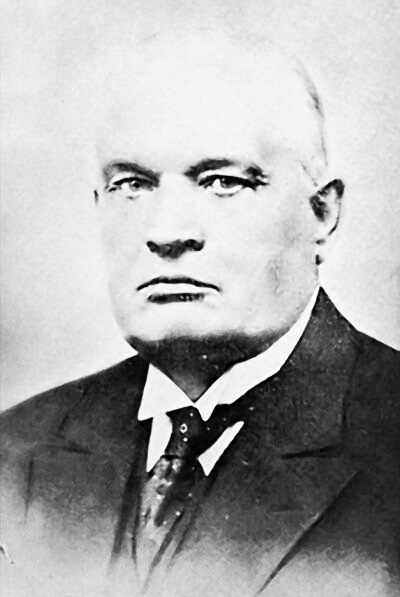

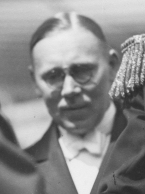
	First party	Second party	Third party
Leader	Otto Strandman	Konstantin Päts	August Rei
Party	Labour Party	Farmers' Assemblies	ESTP
Last election	30 seats	8 seats	41 seats
Seats won	22	21	18
Seat change	▼8	▲13	▼23
Popular vote	99,030	97,825	80,211
Percentage	21.02%	20.76%	17.02%
Prime Minister before election
Ants Piip
Labour Party
State Elder after election
Konstantin Päts
Farmers' Assemblies

Parliamentary elections were held in Estonia between 27 and 29 November 1920, the first held under the 1920 constitution. 100 deputies were elected into the new Riigikogu by party lists in 10 regions, by which one party or electoral bloc could put up several lists in one region. Seats were still distributed on the state level, where votes for different lists were summed up by their political affiliation and then seats distributed using d'Hondt formula. Thereafter seats for one party or bloc were distributed between different lists of that political force using the same formula.

== Results ==
Party	Votes	%	Seats	+/–
Estonian Labour Party	99,030	21.02	22	–8
Farmers' Assemblies	97,825	20.76	21	+13
Estonian Social Democratic Workers' Party	80,211	17.02	18	–23
Estonian Independent Socialist Workers' Party	50,119	10.64	11	+4
Estonian People's Party	48,972	10.39	10	–15
Christian Democratic Party	35,420	7.52	7	+2
Central Committee of Tallinn Trade Unions	24,849	5.27	5	New
German-Baltic Party	18,444	3.91	4	+1
Russian National Union	4,744	1.01	1	0
Economic Group	4,948	1.05	1	New
Russian People's Union	3,876	0.82	0	New
Citizens of the Republic of Estonia at Lake Peipus	1,344	0.29	0	New
Men of Our Mats	614	0.13	0	New
Fighting Army of the Republic of Estonia	221	0.05	0	New
Jewish Minority	211	0.04	0	New
Jewish National Minority	184	0.04	0	New
Christian Group	168	0.04	0	New
Eligible voters of Kuigatsi Parish	48	0.01	0	New
Total	471,228	100.00	100	–20
Registered voters/turnout	653,000	–		
Source: Nohlen & Stöver

Constituency	Labour	Farmers	SocDem Workers	Independent Socialist	People's	Christian	Communists (Note: The Central Committee of Tallinn Trade Unions was a front for the Communist Party, which had used umbrella organisations to participate in politics since being banned in 1918.)	German-Baltic	Russian	Econ.	Others
Constituency	%	%	%	%	%	%	%	%	%	%	%
(1) Tallinn	9.3	7.1	5.7	4.8	6.4	12.7	29.4	11.0	—	4.9	1.8
(2) Harju County	28.3	20.7	8.1	6.4	10.5	12.3	11.3	2.1	—	—	0.3
(3) Lääne County	25.8	28.6	13.0	10.7	4.3	14.5	—	2.6	—	0.5	—
(4) Pärnu County	18.1	26.1	13.8	19.7	7.7	5.8	4.7	4.0	—	—	—
(5) Saare County	27.9	27.3	24.3	5.8	3.1	8.5	—	1.8	—	1.2	—
(6) Järva County	26.0	25.9	16.8	8.8	9.4	6.4	1.8	4.2	—	0.6	—
(7) Tartu County	6.0	17.0	24.3	14.7	21.4	4.0	2.2	4.4	2.7	13.4	2.0
(8) Viru County	29.0	20.5	14.8	9.9	8.8	6.9	—	2.7	—	0.9	6.6
(9) Viljandi County	16.2	25.7	19.1	17.7	7.7	6.0	3.7	2.7	—	—	—
(10) Võru, Valga and Petseri County	29.7	20.5	22.8	4.6	11.5	4.2	—	2.4	4.0	0.4	—
Total	21.02	20.76	17.02	10.64	10.39	7.52	5.27	3.91	1.01	1.05	1.41

== See also ==
- I Riigikogu
