= Aleksander Oinas =

Estonian politician (1887–1942)

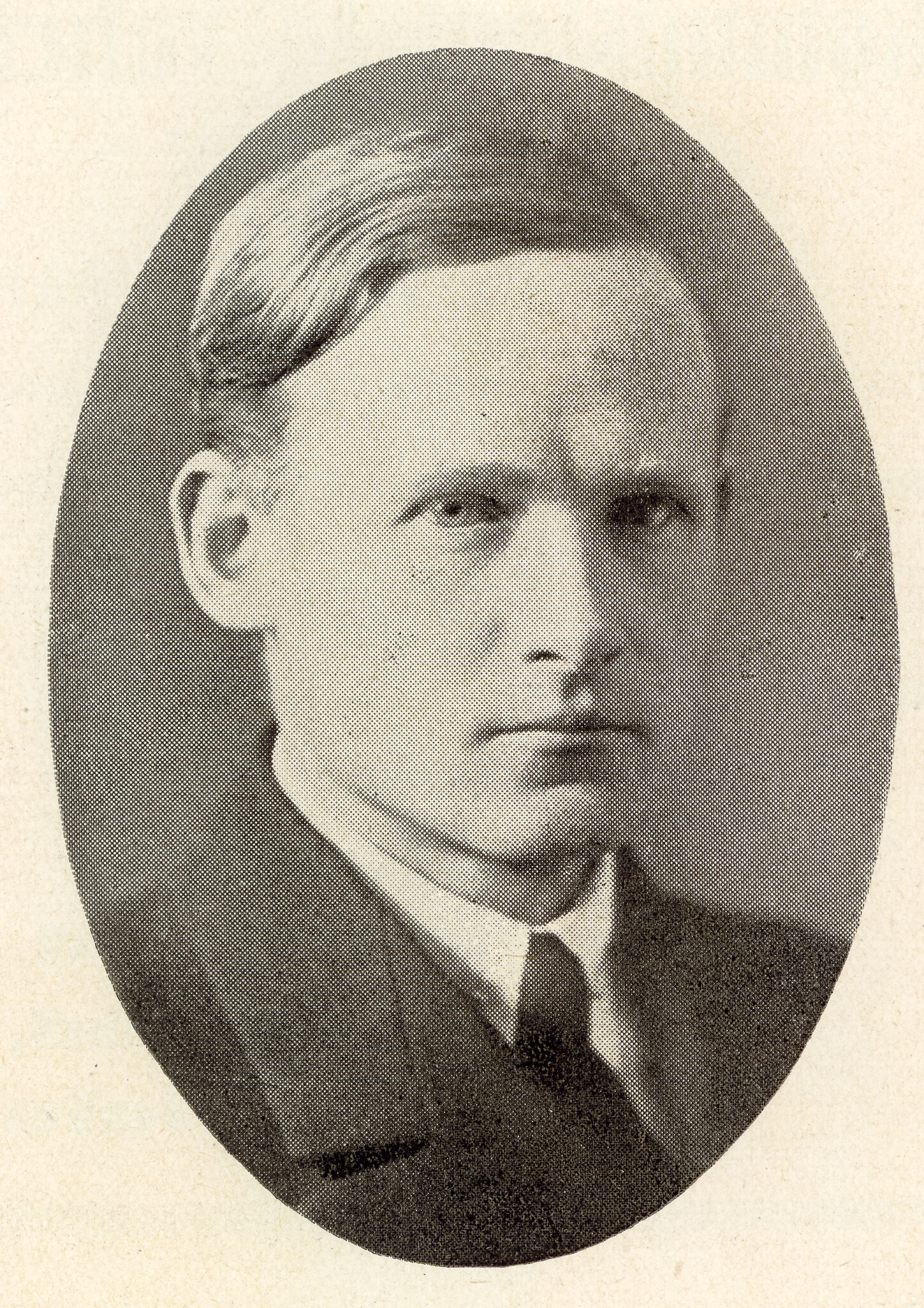

Minister of the Interior (1919) Auditor General (1921–1926) Minister of Finance and Trade and Industry (1928–1929) Minister of Transport (1931–1932)

Personal details
- Born: Aleksander Ferdinand Oinas; 28 December 1887 Tartu, Governorate of Livonia, Russian Empire
- Died: 3 March 1942 (aged 54) Usollag, Russia, Soviet Union
- Spouse: Alma Ostra-Oinas
- Children: 3
- Education: Peter the Great St. Petersburg Polytechnic University

Aleksander Ferdinand Oinas (28 December 1887 – 3 March 1942) was an Estonian politician; he was a long-serving member of the Estonian Parliament (Riigikogu) and served three times as a government minister. was an Estonian politician; he was a long-serving member of the Estonian Parliament (Riigikogu) and served three times as a government minister.

Born in Tartu to Tõnis and Marie Oinas (née Litter), he was the eldest of five siblings. His sister Emma Elisabet (nicknamed "Elo") would marry writer and literary critic Friedebert Tuglas. In 1907, he enrolled at Peter the Great St. Petersburg Polytechnic University, studying economics, and graduating in 1915.

Oinas was a member of the Estonian Provincial Assembly, serving from 26 November 1918 and replacing Hugo Reiman. He sat on the Estonian Constituent Assembly as a member of the Estonian Social Democratic Workers' Party (ESDTP), but did not sit in the first session of the Estonian Parliament (Riigikogu) which followed it. He was elected to the second session in 1923, but resigned on 26 March 1926 and was replaced by Voldemar Krabi. Oinas then sat in each of the four sessions of the Riigikogu which followed (in the National Council during the last) before the dissolution of that institution in 1940 following the Soviet annexation of Estonia.

Oinas was Minister of the Interior between 9 May 1919 and 18 November 1919, Auditor General in 1919 and again from 1921 until 1926, Minister of Finance and Minister of Trade and Industry from 4 December 1928 to 9 July 1929, and finally Minister of Transport from 12 February 1931 to 19 February 1932.

After the Soviet occupation of Estonia, Oinas, together with many other prominent Estonians, was deported to Siberia. He died on 3 March 1942 in Usollag in Perm Oblast (then called Molotov Oblast) in the Soviet Union. He was sentenced to death, but died before the execution. His wife was the journalist and politician Alma Ostra-Oinas; she survived him and died in 1960.
