= Karl Johannes Virma =

Estonian politician (1879–1942)

Karl Johannes Virma (17 March 1879 Tallinn – 19 November 1942 Kirov Oblast) was an Estonian politician. He was a member of the I, II and III Riigikogu. 1924-1925 he was Road Minister.

On 14 June 1941, Virma was arrested in Tallinn by the NKVD following the Soviet occupation of Estonia. He was placed within the Soviet Gulag camp system and died on 19 November 1941.
