= Max Bock =

Estonian judge and politician

Max Woldemar Gustav Eduard Bock (4 April 1885 – 29 April 1948) was a Baltic German politician and lawyer prominent in Estonia.

Bock was born in Reval (later named Tallinn) on 4 April 1885 to Julius Bock, a medical doctor, and his wife Alice, née Kampf. He attended the Nikolai Gymnasium in Reval, studying medicine between 1905 and 1908, then law until 1910, working as a private tutor in the meantime. He then studied law at the Demidov Lyceum in Yaroslavl until 1912, and then practised law in Reval until 1939 and was a district judge in Włocławek between 1940 and 1945.

Bock was elected to the Estonian Provincial Assembly, which governed the Autonomous Governorate of Estonia between 1917 and 1919. He was then elected to the Asutav Kogu (Constituent Assembly) of the newly formed Republic of Estonia in 1919, serving till the session ended in 1920. He was elected to the first legislature of the Riigikogu and served throughout the session (1920–23) as a German-Baltic Party member; he joined the second legislature on 27 September 1923, when he replaced Martin Luther, but stepped down only two days later (he was succeeded by Gerhard Kress).

Bock died on 29 April 1948 at Reicholzried in Germany.
