= Martin Christian Luther =

Estonian businessman and politician

Martin Christian Luther (26 April 1883 Tallinn – 12 March 1963 München) was an Estonians entrepreneur and politician. He was a member of II Riigikogu. On 27 September 1923, he resigned his position and he was replaced by Max Bock.
