= Werner Hasselblatt =

Baltic-German jurist and politician

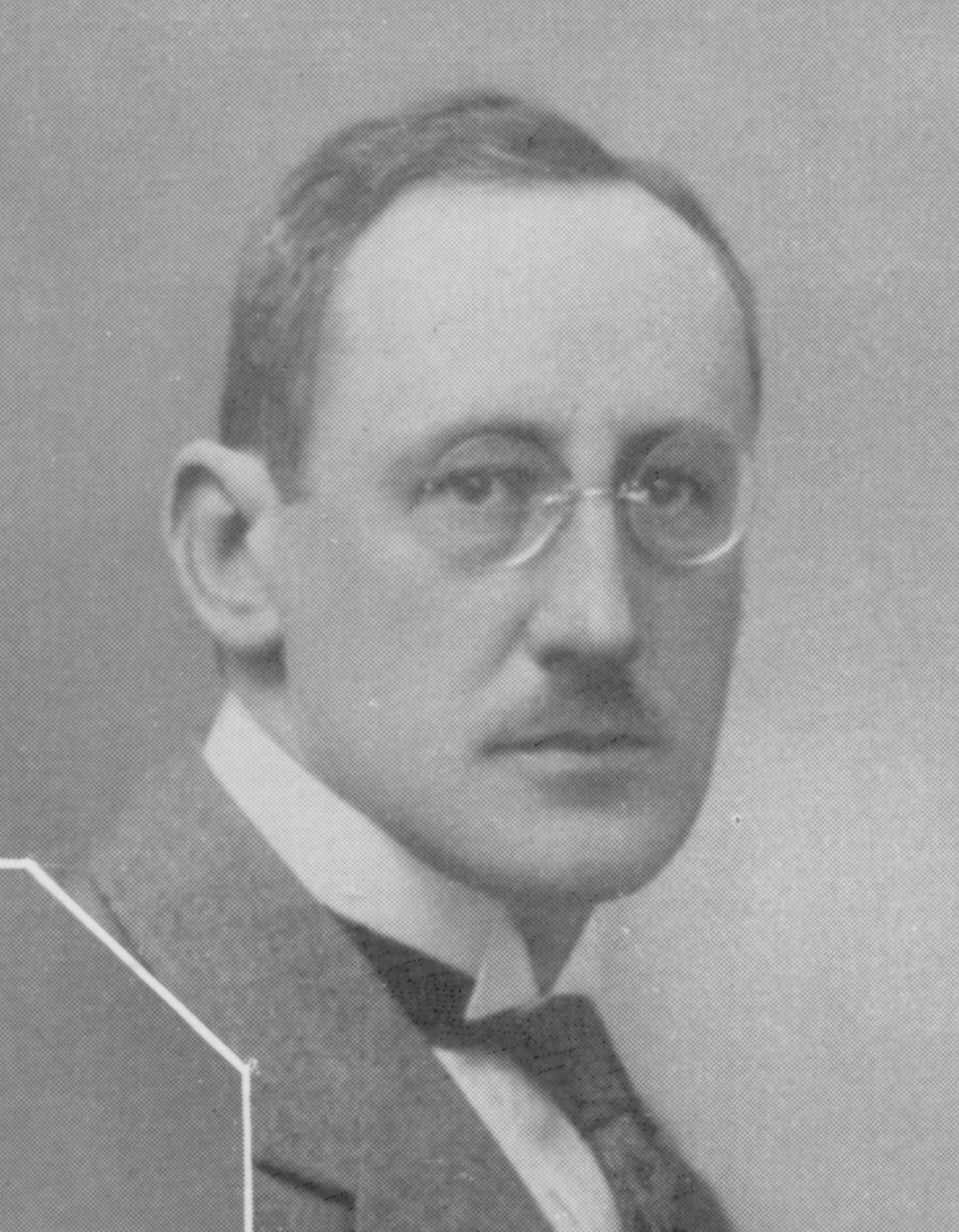
Image of Werner Hasselblatt

Werner Richard Karl Hasselblatt (22 June 1890 Tartu – 24 January 1958 Lüneburg, West Germany) was a Baltic-German jurist and politician. He was deported to Siberia by the Bolsheviks in 1918 and became a member of II Riigikogu in 1923. From 1931 to 1945, he was director of the Verband der deutschen Volksgruppen in Europa (known as Verband der deutschen Minderheiten in Europa until 1929).

== Early life ==
Hasselblatt was born on 22 June 1890 in the city of Tartu, which was then part of the Governorate of Livonia. His father was a writer. He first gained notoriety during World War I, when he attempted to help ethnic Germans who had been deported via the legal services he offered. However, shortly thereafter, following the successful October Revolution where the Bolsheviks seized power, he was deported to Siberia himself, specifically to the city of Krasnoyarsk. After fleeing in 1920, he managed to join the Baltic Regiment, which was an anti-Soviet volunteer unit formed during the Estonian War of Independence.
