= Central Committee of Tallinn Trade Unions =

Political party in Estonia

Central Committee of Tallinn Trade Unions Tallinna Ametiühisuste Keskbüroo
- Founded: 1917
- Dissolved: 1922
- Succeeded by: Workers' United Front
- Ideology: Communism; Marxism-Leninism
- Political position: Far-left
- Colours: Red

The Central Committee of Tallinn Trade Unions (Estonian: Tallinna Ametiühisuste Kesknõukogu, TAK) was a political organisation in Estonia.

== History ==
The party was a front for the Communist Party, which had used umbrella organisations to participate in politics since being banned in 1918. In the 1920 parliamentary elections the party won five seats in the Riigikogu. It did not contest the 1923 elections, in which the Communist Party put forward the Workers' United Front instead.
