= Voldemar Krabi =

Estonian politician

Voldemar Krabi (also Voldemar Krabbi; 14 June 1893, in Paide – ?) was an Estonian politician. He was a member of II Riigikogu, representing the Estonian Socialist Workers' Party. He was a member of the Riigikogu since 26 March 1926. He replaced Aleksander Oinas.
