= Economic Group (Estonia) =

Estonian political party

Economic Group Majandusline Rühm
- Founded: 1920
- Dissolved: 1932
- Succeeded by: National Centre Party
- Ideology: Classical liberalism Fiscal conservatism
- Political position: Centre-right

The Economic Group (Estonian: Majandusline Rühm) was a political party in Estonia.

== History ==
The party first contested national elections in 1920, winning a single seat in the parliamentary elections with 1.1% of the vote. In the 1923 elections the party's vote share fell to 0.5% and it lost its only seat in the Riigikogu. It did not contest any further elections.
