= Alfred Kütt =

Estonian politician

Alfred Kütt (17 September 1894 in Roela Parish (now Vinni Parish), Wierland County – ?) was an Estonian politician. He was a member of II Riigikogu, representing the Settlers' Party. On 19 August 1924, he resigned his position and he was replaced by Johannes Krass.
