= Johann Kesküll =

Estonian politician (1872–1924)

Johann Kesküll (also Johannes Eduard Kesküll; 24 June 1872 in Tallinn – 3 October 1924 in Tallinn) was an Estonian politician. He was a member of I Riigikogu.
