= Johan Holberg =

Estonian politician (1893–1978)

Johan Holberg (20 February 1893 – 8 April 1978, Chicago) was an Estonian politician. From 1927 to 1928, he was minister of commerce and industry. After the Second World War, he lived in Toronto, Canada, as prime minister of the Estonian government in exile.
