= Mihkel Neps =

Estonian politician (1890–1937)

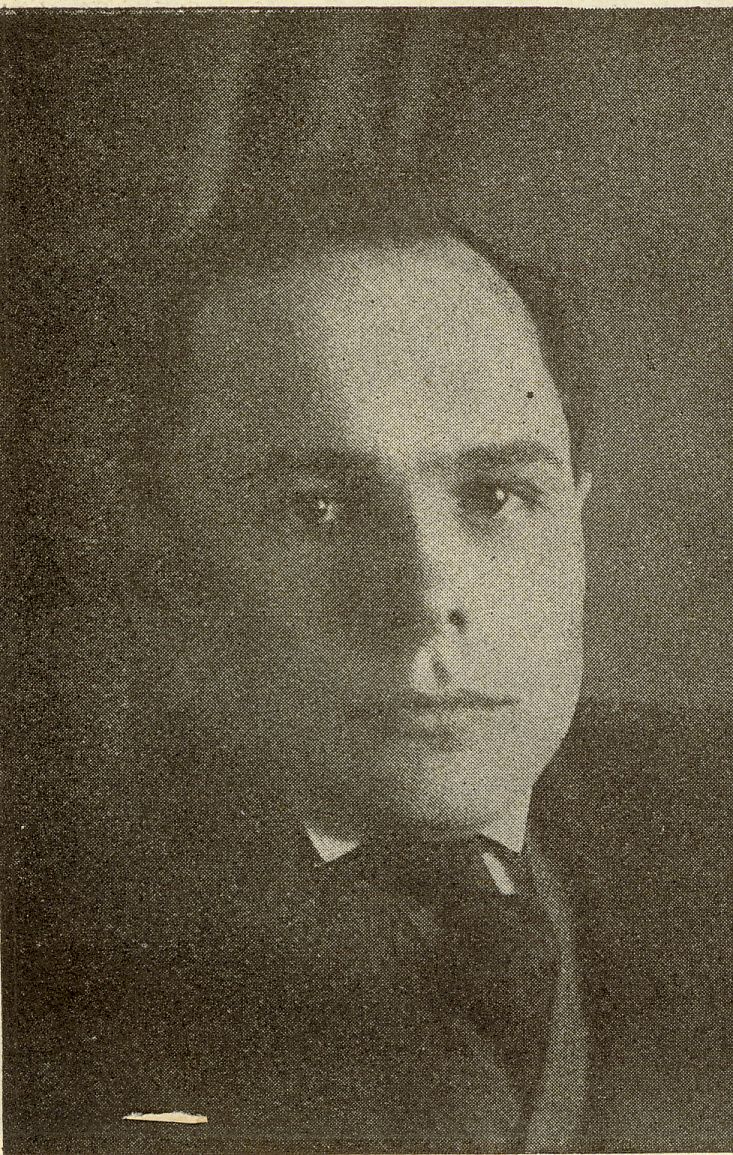
Mihkel Neps

Mihkel Neps (19 September 1890 Lümanda Parish (now Saaremaa Parish), Kreis Ösel – 21 March 1937 Kuressaare, Saare County) was an Estonian politician. He was a member of Estonian Constituent Assembly.
