= Tõnis Kalbus =

Estonian politician (1880–1942)

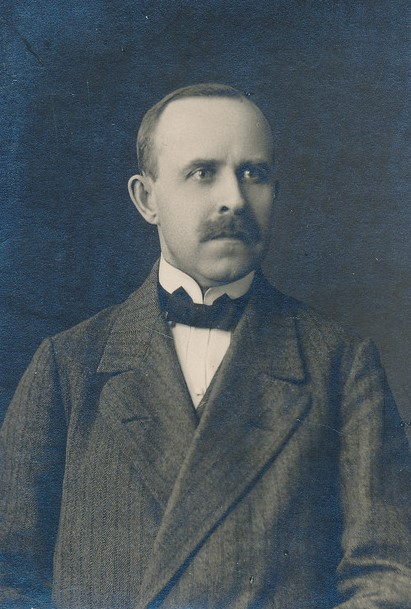

Tõnis Kalbus (also Tõnu Kalbus; 5 December 1880, Tori Parish – 20 March 1942 Sosva, Sverdlovsk Oblast, Russian SFSR) was an Estonian lawyer and politician.

From 1925 to 1926 he was Minister of Justice. From 1928 to 1930 he was Minister of Justice and Minister of Internal Affairs.

Following the Soviet occupation of Estonia in 1940, Kalbus was arrested by the NKVD and deported to Sverdlovsk Oblast and died in the Sosva gulag camp.
