= Johannes-Friedrich Zimmermann =

Estonian politician (1882–1942)

Minister of Economic Affairs
- In office 1929–1931

Minister of Agriculture
- In office 1933–1933

Personal details
- Born: 10 May 1882 Sosva, Sverdlovsk Oblast, Russia
- Died: 24 August 1942 (aged 60) Sosva, Sverdlovsk Oblast, Russia

Johannes-Friedrich Zimmermann (10 May 1882 – 24 August 1942 in Sosva, Sverdlovsk Oblast, Russia) was an Estonian politician.

He was Minister of Economic Affairs from 1929 to 1931, and again in 1932. He became Minister of Agriculture in 1933.
