= Johannes Meyer (Estonian politician) =

Estonian politician (1858–1945)

Johannes Meyer (also Johann Meier; 24 April 1858 Puhja Parish (now Elva Parish), Kreis Dorpat – 15 April 1945 Adlershorst, Germany) was an Estonian politician. He was a member of Estonian Constituent Assembly. On 26 January 1920, he resigned his position and he was replaced by Georg Stackelberg.
