= Jerwen County =

Uyezd in Estonia Governorate, Russian Empire

Coordinates: 59°00′N 25°00′E

Jerwen County Вейсенштейнскій уѣздъ
- Uezd
- Location in the Governorate of Estonia
- Country: Russian Empire
- Governorate: Estonia
- Established: 1745
- Abolished: 1920
- Capital: Weissenstein

Area
  - Total: 2,871.21 km^{2} (1,108.58 sq mi)

Population (1897)
  - Total: 52,673
  - Density: 18.345/km^{2} (47.514/sq mi)

Jerwen County (German: Kreis Jerwen or Kreis Weissenstein, Estonian: Järva kreis or Paide kreis, Russian: Вейсенштейнскій/Еервенскій уѣздъ, romanized: Veysenshteynskiy/Yervenskiy uyezd) was one of the four counties of the Russian Empire located in the Governorate of Estonia. It was situated in the central part of the governorate (in present-day northern Estonia). Its capital was Paide (Weissenstein). The territory of Jerwen County corresponds to most of present-day Järva County and small parts of Lääne-Viru and Rapla counties.

== Demographics ==
At the time of the Russian Empire Census of 1897, Jerwen County had a population of 52,673. Of these, 96.7% spoke Estonian, 2.2% German, 0.8% Russian, 0.1% Yiddish and 0.1% Latvian as their native language.
