= Kuressaare kreis =

Uyezd of Russian Empire

Kreis Ösel (Estonian: Kuressaare kreis, Russian: Эзельский уезд) was one of the nine subdivisions of the Governorate of Livonia of the Russian Empire. Its capital was Kuressaare (Arensburg). It was situated in the northwestern part of the governorate (in present-day western Estonia). The territory of Kreis Ösel corresponds to the present-day Saare County.

== Demographics ==
At the time of the Russian Empire Census of 1897, Kreis Ösel had a population of 60,263. Of these, 95.5% spoke Estonian, 2.6% German, 0.9% Russian, 0.4% Swedish, 0.4% Ukrainian, 0.1% Yiddish, 0.1% Latvian and 0.1% Polish as their native language.
