= Workers' United Front =

Estonian political party

Workers' United Front Töörahva Ühine Väerind
- Succeeded by: Estonian Workers' Party
- Colours: Red

The Workers' United Front (Estonian: Töörahva Ühine Väerind) was a political party in Estonia.

== History ==
The party was a front for the Communist Party, which had used umbrella organisations to participate in politics since being banned in 1918. In the 1923 elections the party won 10 seats, an increase on the five won by the Communists in the 1920 elections running under the guise of the Central Committee of Tallinn Trade Unions.

For the 1926 elections the Communists ran as the Estonian Workers' Party.
