= Viljandi kreis =

Uyezd of Russian Empire

Viljandi County (Estonian: Viljandi kreis; German: Kreis Fellin oder Der Fellinsche Kreis, Russian: Феллинскій уѣздъ, romanized: Fellinskiy uyezd) was a historic county in the Governorate of Livonia, and in the Republic of Estonia dissolved during the administrative territorial reform of the Estonian SSR in 1949. It was situated in the northern part of the governorate (in present-day southern Estonia). Its capital was Viljandi (Fellin). The territory of the old Viljandi County corresponds to the most part of the present-day Viljandi County and parts of Järva, Jõgeva and Valga counties.

== Demographics ==
At the time of the Russian Empire Census of 1897, Viljandi County had a population of 99,747. Of these, 97.1% spoke Estonian, 1.8% German, 0.5% Russian, 0.3% Yiddish, 0.1% Latvian and 0.1% Romani as their native language.
