= 2nd Riigikogu =

Parliament of Estonia 1923–1926

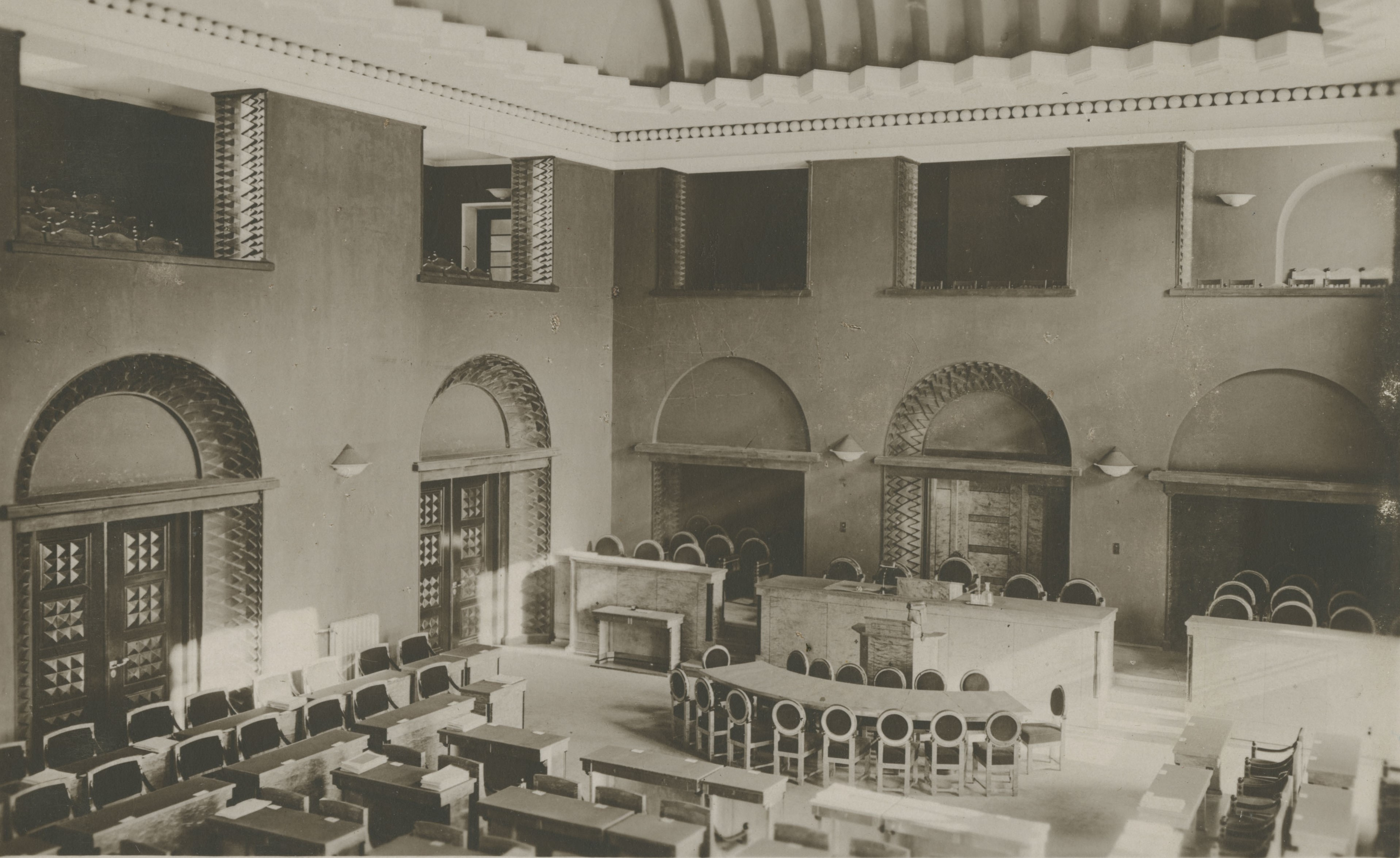
The Riigikogu session hall in the 1920s

The 2nd Riigikogu was the second legislature of the Estonian Parliament (Riigikogu). It was elected in the 1923 elections, held on 5–7 May 1923, and sat from 31 May 1923 until 14 June 1926, before the next elections took place.

== Officers ==
The following is a list of the Riigikogu's officers during the second legislative session:

=== Chairmen ===
- Jaan Tõnisson, 7 June 1923 – 27 May 1925
- August Rei, from 9 June 1925

=== First Assistant Chairmen ===
- Karl Johannes Virma, 7 June 1923 – 27 November 1924
- Jaan Soots, 27 November 1924 – 16 December 1924
- August Jürima, from 16 December 1924

=== Second Assistant Chairmen ===
- Aleksander Leopold Raudkepp, 7 June 1923 – 27 November 1924
- Karl Johannes Virma, 27 November 1924 – 16 December 1924
- Mihkel Martna, 16 December 1924 – 10 December 1925
- Tõnis Kalbus, 10 June 1925– 15 December 1925
- Johannes-Friedrich Zimmermann, 18 December 1925 – 18 February 1926
- Mihkel Juhkam, from 19 February 1926

=== Secretary ===
- Tõnis Kalbus, 7 June 1923 – 10 June 1925
- Johan Holberg, from 10 June 1925

=== First Assistant Secretary ===
- Oskar Köster, 7 June 1923 – 27 November 1924
- Johan Holberg, 27 November 1924 – 10 June 1925
- Aleksander Leopold Raudkepp, from 10 June 1925

=== Second Assistant Secretary ===
- Jaan Vain, 7 June 1923 – 27 November 1924
- Jaan Piiskar, from 27 November 1924
