= List of heads of government of Estonia =

This is a list of people, who have been heads of government of the Republic of Estonia from 1918, either as a Chairman of the Council of Elders (1918), Prime Minister (1918–1920; 1934–1940 and from 1990), State Elder (1920–1934) or President-Regent (1937–1938). The office of prime minister (Peaminister) first came into use soon after Estonia gained its independence in 1918. From 1918 to 1934, Estonia used a parliamentary political system, where the presidency and ministry were subject to parliamentary confidence, but instead of a presidential office, the government was headed by a prime minister and from 1920 to 1934, a similar office called State Elder (Riigivanem).

The 1934 constitution gave the State Elder the role of the president, with a separate head of government created, restoring the office of prime minister. The new system was obstructed by a 1934 coup d'état by head of government Konstantin Päts. During his authoritarian era (1934–1937), he ruled as both prime minister and State Elder. The latter office was entrusted to him briefly until the presidential elections. In 1937, the two offices were combined into the office of President-Regent (Riigihoidja), but the situation was again changed with the 1938 constitution, when Konstantin Päts gave up the office of prime minister to a new officeholder.

The Soviet occupation of Estonia in 1940 made Johannes Vares the new prime minister of Estonia, but his rule was later declared to have been illegal. According to the 1938 constitution, Prime Minister was to lead the presidency in case the President couldn't be elected, a move that was implemented for the Estonian Government in Exile. The interim government restored the office of prime minister in 1990.

== List of heads of government ==
Portrait	Name	Term of office			Political party	Cabinet	Riigikogu (Election)	Separate head of state
Portrait	Name	Took office	Left office	Days	Political party	Cabinet	Riigikogu (Election)	Separate head of state
—	Konstantin Päts (1874–1956); Chairman of the Council of Ministers of the Provisional Government	24 February 1918	12 November 1918	440	Country People's Union (EMRL)	Päts I Provisional; EMRL–ETE–EDE–ESDTP	Provisional; Provincial; Assembly (1917)	None
—	Prime Minister of the Provisional Government	12 November 1918	27 November 1918	440	Country People's Union (EMRL)	Päts II Provisional; EMRL–ETE–EDE; EMRL–ETE–EDE–ESDTP (Note: The Estonian Social Democratic Workers' Party (ESDTP) joined the coalition on 16 November 1918.)	Provisional; Provincial; Assembly (1917)	None
—	Prime Minister of the Provisional Government	27 November 1918	9 May 1919	440	Country People's Union (EMRL)	Päts III Provisional; EMRL–ETE–EDE–ESDTP; EMRL–ETE–EDE–ESDTP–SEE; EMRL–ETE–EDE–ESDTP–SEE–VKK; EMRL–ETE–ERE–ESDTP–SEE–VKK (Note: The German Party in Estonia (SEE) joined the coalition on 28 November 1918. The Russian Citizens' Assembly (VKK) joined the coalition on 28 February 1919. The Estonian Democratic Party (EDE) merged with the Estonian Radical Democratic Party (ERDE) to form the Estonian People's Party (ERE) on 1 March 1919 and the new party remained in the coalition.)	Provisional; Provincial; Assembly (1917)	None
1	Otto August Strandman (1875–1941); 1st Prime Minister	9 May 1919	18 November 1919	194	Labour Party (ETE)	Strandman I ETE–ESDTP–ERE; ETE–ESDTP (Note: The Estonian People's Party (ERE) left the coalition on 20 September 1919.)	Constituent; Assembly (1919)	None
2	Jaan Tõnisson (1868–1941?); 2nd Prime Minister	18 November 1919	28 July 1920	254	People's Party (ERE)	Tõnisson I ERE–ETE–ESDTP; ERE–ETE–(ESDTP) (Note: The Estonian Social Democratic Workers' Party (ESDTP) left the coalition on 1 July 1920, but its ministers remained in office.)	Constituent; Assembly (1919)	None
3	Ado Birk (1883–1942); 3rd Prime Minister	28 July 1920	30 July 1920	3	People's Party (ERE)	Birk; ERE–ETE–KRE	Constituent; Assembly (1919)	None
4	Jaan Tõnisson (1868–1941?); 4th Prime Minister (2nd term)	30 July 1920	26 October 1920	89	People's Party (ERE)	Tõnisson II; ERE	Constituent; Assembly (1919)	None
5	Ants Piip (1884–1942); 5th Prime Minister	26 October 1920	20 December 1920	92	Labour Party (ETE)	Piip; ETE	Constituent; Assembly (1919)	None
5	1st State Elder	20 December 1920	25 January 1921	92	Labour Party (ETE)	Piip; ETE	Constituent; Assembly (1919)	None
—	Konstantin Päts (1874–1956); 2nd State Elder (2nd term)	25 January 1921	21 November 1922	666	Farmers' Assemblies (PK)	Päts I PK–ETE–ERE–KRE; PK–(ETE)–ERE–KRE; PK–ERE–KRE (Note: The Estonian Labour Party (ETE) left the coalition on 13 October 1921. Its ministers resigned on 20 October 1921.)	I (1920)	None
—	Juhan Kukk (1885–1942); 3rd State Elder	21 November 1922	2 August 1923	255	Labour Party (ETE)	Kukk; ETE–PK–ERE; ETE–PK–(ERE) (Note: The Minister of Internal Affairs Karl August Einbund, the only representative of the Estonian People's Party (ERE) in the coalition, left the party on 5 March 1923. His former party decided to remain in the coalition without any ministerial positions.)	I (1920)	None
—	Konstantin Päts (1874–1956); 4th State Elder (3rd term)	2 August 1923	26 March 1924	238	Farmers' Assemblies (PK)	Päts II; PK–KRE–ERE–ETE; PK–KRE–ERE–(ETE); PK–KRE–ERE (Note: The Estonian Labour Party (ETE) left the coalition on 14 February 1924. Its ministers remained in office until 19 February 1924.)	II (1923)	None
—	Friedrich Karl Akel (1871–1941); 5th State Elder	26 March 1924	16 December 1924	266	Christian People's Party (KRE)	Akel; KRE–ETE–ERE	II (1923)	None
—	Jüri Jaakson (1870–1942); 6th State Elder	16 December 1924	15 December 1925	365	People's Party (ERE)	Jaakson; ERE–PK–ESDTP–ETE–KRE; ERE–PK–ESTP–ETE–KRE (Note: The Estonian Social Democratic Workers' Party (ESDTP) merged with the Independent Socialist Workers' Party (ISTP) and formed the Estonian Socialist Workers' Party (ESTP) on 9 April 1925 and the new party remained in the coalition.)	II (1923)	None
—	Jaan Teemant (1872–1941?); 7th State Elder	15 December 1925	23 July 1926	725	Farmers' Assemblies (PK)	Teemant I PK–ETE–KRE–ARVK; PK–ETE–KRE–ARVK–RVP (Note: The National Liberal Party (RVP) joined the coalition on 12 January 1926.)	II (1923)	None
—	Jaan Teemant (1872–1941?); 7th State Elder	23 July 1926	4 March 1927	725	Farmers' Assemblies (PK)	Teemant II; PK–ARVK–KRE–ERE–ÜMSL	III (1926)	None
—	Jaan Teemant (1872–1941?); 7th State Elder	4 March 1927	9 December 1927	725	Farmers' Assemblies (PK)	Teemant III; PK–ARVK–ERE–KRE–ÜMSL	III (1926)	None
—	Jaan Tõnisson (1868–1941?); 8th State Elder (3rd term)	9 December 1927	4 December 1928	362	People's Party (ERE)	Tõnisson III; ERE–PK–ARVK–ETE	III (1926)	None
—	August Rei (1886–1963); 9th State Elder	4 December 1928	9 July 1929	218	Socialist Workers' Party (ESTP)	Rei; ESTP–ARVK–ETE–KRE	III (1926)	None
—	Otto August Strandman (1875–1941); 10th State Elder (2nd term)	9 July 1929	12 February 1931	584	Labour Party (ETE)	Strandman II; ETE–ARVK–PK–KRE–ERE; ETE–ARVK–PK–KRE; ETE–PAVK–PK–KRE (Note: The Estonian People's Party (ERE) was asked to leave the coalition on 23 January 1931. The Settlers', State Tenants' and Smallholders' Group (ARVK) formed the Party of Settlers and Farmers (APE) on 30 January 1931 and it became known by the name of its parliament faction Farmers', Settlers' and Smallholders' Group (PAVK).)	IV (1929)	None
—	Konstantin Päts (1874–1956); 11th State Elder (4th term)	12 February 1931	19 February 1932	373	Farmers' Assemblies (PK)	Päts III; PK–ERE–ESTP; PK–ERE/(KRE)–ESTP; PK/(PAVK)–ERE/(KRE)–ESTP; PK/(PAVK)–RKE–ESTP (Note: The parliamentary group of the Estonian People's Party (ERE) merged with the parliamentary group of the Christian People's Party (KRE) on 28 October 1931 and the parliamentary group of the Farmers' Assemblies (PK) with the parliamentary group of the Settlers', State Tenants' and Smallholders' Group (PAVK) on 26 January 1932, with both party coalitions remaining in the coalition. The Estonian People's Party (ERE) and the Christian People's Party (KRE), already in a party coalition, merged with the Estonian Labour Party (ETE) and formed the National Centre Party (RKE) on 29 January 1932. The party remained in the coalition.)	IV (1929)	None
—	Jaan Teemant (1872–1941?); 12th State Elder (2nd term)	19 February 1932	19 July 1932	152	Farmers' Assemblies (PK)	Teemant IV; PK/PAVK–RKE; ÜPE–RKE (Note: The Farmers' Assemblies (PK) and the Settlers', State Tenants' and Smallholders' Group (PAVK), already in a party coalition, merged and formed the United Farmers' Party (ÜPE) on 29 February 1932. The new party remained in the coalition.)	IV (1929)	None
—	Jaan Teemant (1872–1941?); 12th State Elder (2nd term)	19 February 1932	19 July 1932	152	United Farmers' Party (ÜPE)	Teemant IV; PK/PAVK–RKE; ÜPE–RKE	IV (1929)	None
—	Karl August Einbund (later Kaarel Eenpalu) (1888–1942); 13th State Elder	19 July 1932	1 November 1932	106	United Farmers' Party (ÜPE)	Einbund I ÜPE–RKE (Note: As Karl August Einbund Estonianized his name into Kaarel Eenpalu, his two cabinets are therefore known as Einbund I and Eenpalu II cabinets.)	V (1932)	None
—	Konstantin Päts (1874–1956); 14th State Elder (5th term)	1 November 1932	18 May 1933	199	United Farmers' Party (ÜPE)	Päts IV; ÜPE–RKE–ESTP	V (1932)	None
—	Jaan Tõnisson (1868–1941?); 15th State Elder (4th term)	18 May 1933	21 October 1933	157	National Centre Party (RKE)	Tõnisson IV; RKE–PK	V (1932)	None
6	Konstantin Päts (1874–1956); 16th State Elder	21 October 1933	24 January 1934	1,647	Farmers' Assemblies (PK) (Note: All political parties were banned on 20 March 1935.)	Päts V non-party coalition (Note: Although Konstantin Päts resigned as President-Regent on 24 April 1938 to become the President on the same day, his cabinet remained temporarily in office until 9 May 1938, headed by acting Prime Minister Kaarel Eenpalu.)	V (1932)	None
6	6th prime minister (in duties of the State Elder)	24 January 1934	3 September 1937	1,647	Farmers' Assemblies (PK)	Päts V non-party coalition	V (1932)	Prime Minister in duties of the State Elder; Konstantin; Päts
6	6th prime minister (in duties of the State Elder)	24 January 1934	3 September 1937	1,647	None (Note: Was member of the Patriotic League which was the only sanctioned political organization, but which cannot be considered a political party per se.)	Päts V non-party coalition	Parliament suspended (Note: After Konstantin Päts' 12 March 1934 self-coup, which was approved by the Riigikogu retroactively on 15 March 1934, the parliament was not convened after 2 October 1934. It was officially disbanded on 1 January 1938 when the new constitution came into force.)	Prime Minister in duties of the State Elder; Konstantin; Päts
6	President-Regent (6th term)	3 September 1937	24 April 1938	1,647	None	Päts V non-party coalition	Parliament suspended	None
7	Kaarel Eenpalu (formerly Karl August Einbund) (1888–1942); Acting prime minister	24 April 1938	9 May 1938	537	None	Päts V (continued) non-party coalition	Parliament suspended	President; Konstantin; Päts (1938–1940)
7	7th prime minister (2nd term)	9 May 1938	12 October 1939	537	None	Eenpalu II non-party coalition	VI (1938)	President; Konstantin; Päts (1938–1940)
8	Jüri Uluots (1890–1945); 8th prime minister	12 October 1939	21 June 1940 (Note: The Soviet Union occupied Estonia on 17 June 1940. The Soviet regime staged a pro-Soviet coup d'état on 21 June 1940, replacing the Jüri Uluots cabinet with that of Johannes Vares. The Republic of Estonia does not consider the Johannes Vares cabinet a legal government of Estonia and considers the Jüri Uluots cabinet to have legally remained in office until 18 September 1944.)	254	None	Uluots non-party coalition	VI (1938)	President; Konstantin; Päts (1938–1940)
1st Soviet Occupation (1940–1941)
German Occupation (1941–1944)
—	Otto Tief (1889–1976); Acting prime minister	18 September 1944 (Note: Prime Minister in the duties of the President Jüri Uluots appointed a new government after the departure of German forces, hoping to restore Estonian independence before the arrival of Soviet forces.)	25 September 1944 (Note: The Soviet Union occupied Estonia on 17 June 1940. The Soviet regime staged a pro-Soviet coup d'état on 21 June 1940, replacing the Jüri Uluots cabinet with that of Johannes Vares. The Republic of Estonia does not consider the Johannes Vares cabinet a legal government of Estonia and considers the Jüri Uluots cabinet to have legally remained in office until 18 September 1944.)	8	None	Tief non-party coalition	Parliament disbanded	Prime Minister in duties of the President; Jüri Uluots (Note: The legal Prime Minister Jüri Uluots assumed the role of Prime Minister in the duties of the President on 18 September 1944, after the departure of German forces and before the arrival of Soviet forces.)
2nd Soviet Occupation (1944–1991) (See Estonian Government in Exile)
—	Edgar Savisaar (1950–2022); 1st prime minister of the Interim Government	3 April 1990 (Note: The Supreme Soviet of the Estonian SSR on 30 March 1990 declared Soviet rule to have been illegal since 1940 and declared a transition period for full independence. Full independence was restored on 20 August 1991.)	29 January 1992	668	Popular Front of Estonia (ERR) (Note: The Popular Front of Estonia formed the Estonian People's Centre Party on 12 October 1991.); Estonian People's Centre Party (ERKE)	Savisaar Interim various coalition partners	Supreme; Soviet (1990) (Note: The "Estonian Soviet Socialist Republic" was renamed the "Republic of Estonia" on 8 May 1990 and thus the translation of the Ülemnõukogu was changed from "Supreme Soviet" to "Supreme Council".)	Chairman of the Supreme Soviet
—	Edgar Savisaar (1950–2022); 1st prime minister of the Interim Government	3 April 1990	29 January 1992	668	Popular Front of Estonia (ERR) Estonian People's Centre Party (ERKE)	Savisaar Interim various coalition partners	Supreme; Soviet (1990)	Chairman of the Supreme Council; Arnold Rüütel
—	Tiit Vähi (b. 1947); 2nd prime minister of the Interim Government	29 January 1992	21 October 1992	266	None	Vähi Interim various coalition partners	Supreme; Soviet (1990)	Chairman of the Supreme Council; Arnold Rüütel
—	Tiit Vähi (b. 1947); 2nd prime minister of the Interim Government	29 January 1992	21 October 1992	266	None	Vähi Interim various coalition partners	Supreme; Soviet (1990)	President; Lennart Georg Meri (1992–2001) (Note: President left the party upon assuming office.)
9	Mart Laar (b. 1960); 9th prime minister	21 October 1992	8 November 1994	749	Pro Patria (I) (Note: The electoral alliance "Pro Patria" formed the Pro Patria National Coalition Party on 21 November 1992.); Pro Patria National Coalition Party (RKEI)	Laar I I–M–ERSP; RKEI–M–ERSP; RKEI–M–ERSP–ELDP; RKEI–M–ERSP–(ELDP); RKEI–M–ERSP–ELDP (Note: The electoral alliance "Moderates" (M) consisted of the Social Democratic Party (ESDP) and the Estonian Rural Centre Party (EMKE).) (Note: The Estonian Liberal Democratic Party (ELDP) joined the coalition on 11 January 1994. Its ministers resigned on 21 June 1994, but the party decided to remain in the coalition and named a minister on 27 June 1994.)	VII (1992)	President; Lennart Georg Meri (1992–2001)
10	Andres Tarand (b. 1940); 10th prime minister	8 November 1994	17 April 1995	161	Moderates (M)	Tarand; M–RKEI–ERSP–ELDP–VKRE	VII (1992)	President; Lennart Georg Meri (1992–2001)
11	Tiit Vähi (b. 1947); 11th prime minister (2nd term)	17 April 1995	6 November 1995	701	Coalition Party and Country People's Alliance (KMÜ)	Vähi I KMÜ–EKE	VIII (1995)	President; Lennart Georg Meri (1992–2001)
11	Tiit Vähi (b. 1947); 11th prime minister (2nd term)	6 November 1995	17 March 1997	701	Coalition Party and Country People's Alliance (KMÜ)	Vähi II; KMÜ–ERE; KMÜ; KMÜ–AP (Note: The Estonian Reform Party (ERE) left the coalition on 1 December 1996. The Progress Party (AP) joined the coalition on 9 December 1996.)	VIII (1995)	President; Lennart Georg Meri (1992–2001)
12	Mart Siimann (b. 1946); 12th prime minister	17 March 1997	25 March 1999	739	Coalition Party and Country People's Alliance (KMÜ)	Siimann; KMÜ–AP	VIII (1995)	President; Lennart Georg Meri (1992–2001)
13	Mart Laar (b. 1960); 13th prime minister (2nd term)	25 March 1999	28 January 2002	1,041	Pro Patria Union (IL)	Laar II; IL–RM–ERE	IX (1999)	President; Lennart Georg Meri (1992–2001)
13	Mart Laar (b. 1960); 13th prime minister (2nd term)	25 March 1999	28 January 2002	1,041	Pro Patria Union (IL)	Laar II; IL–RM–ERE	IX (1999)	President; Arnold Rüütel (2001–2006)
14	Siim Kallas (1948–2026); 14th prime minister	28 January 2002	10 April 2003	438	Reform Party (ERE)	S. Kallas; ERE–EKE	IX (1999)	President; Arnold Rüütel (2001–2006)
15	Juhan Parts (b. 1966); 15th prime minister	10 April 2003	12 April 2005	735	Res Publica Party (RP)	Parts; RP–ERE–ERL	X (2003)	President; Arnold Rüütel (2001–2006)
16	Andrus Ansip (b. 1956); 16th prime minister	12 April 2005	5 April 2007	3,271	Reform Party (ERE)	Ansip I ERE–EKE–ERL	X (2003)	President; Arnold Rüütel (2001–2006)
16	Andrus Ansip (b. 1956); 16th prime minister	12 April 2005	5 April 2007	3,271	Reform Party (ERE)	Ansip I ERE–EKE–ERL	X (2003)	President; Toomas Hendrik Ilves (2006–2016)
16	Andrus Ansip (b. 1956); 16th prime minister	5 April 2007	6 April 2011	3,271	Reform Party (ERE)	Ansip II; ERE–IRL–SDE; ERE–IRL (Note: The Social Democratic Party (SDE) left the coalition on 21 May 2009.)	XI (2007)	President; Toomas Hendrik Ilves (2006–2016)
16	Andrus Ansip (b. 1956); 16th prime minister	6 April 2011	26 March 2014	3,271	Reform Party (ERE)	Ansip III; ERE–IRL	XII (2011)	President; Toomas Hendrik Ilves (2006–2016)
17	Taavi Rõivas (b. 1979); 17th prime minister	26 March 2014	9 April 2015	973	Reform Party (ERE)	Rõivas I ERE–SDE	XII (2011)	President; Toomas Hendrik Ilves (2006–2016)
17	Taavi Rõivas (b. 1979); 17th prime minister	9 April 2015	23 November 2016	973	Reform Party (ERE)	Rõivas II; ERE–SDE–IRL	XIII (2015)	President; Toomas Hendrik Ilves (2006–2016)
17	Taavi Rõivas (b. 1979); 17th prime minister	9 April 2015	23 November 2016	973	Reform Party (ERE)	Rõivas II; ERE–SDE–IRL	XIII (2015)	President; Kersti Kaljulaid (2016–2021)
18	Jüri Ratas (b. 1978); 18th prime minister	23 November 2016	29 April 2019	1525	Centre Party (EKE)	Ratas I EKE–SDE–IRL; EKE–SDE–I (Note: The Union of Pro Patria and Res Publica was renamed Party Pro Patria on 2 June 2018.)	XIII (2015)	President; Kersti Kaljulaid (2016–2021)
18	Jüri Ratas (b. 1978); 18th prime minister	29 April 2019	26 January 2021	1525	Centre Party (EKE)	Ratas II; EKE–EKRE–I	XIV (2019)	President; Kersti Kaljulaid (2016–2021)
19	Kaja Kallas (b. 1977); 19th prime minister	26 January 2021	14 July 2022	1273	Reform Party (ERE)	K. Kallas I ERE–EKE; ERE (Note: The Estonian Centre Party (EKE) was asked to leave the coalition on 3 June 2022.)	XIV (2019)	President; Kersti Kaljulaid (2016–2021)
19	Kaja Kallas (b. 1977); 19th prime minister	26 January 2021	14 July 2022	1273	Reform Party (ERE)	K. Kallas I ERE–EKE; ERE	XIV (2019)	President; Alar Karis (2021–Present)
19	Kaja Kallas (b. 1977); 19th prime minister	18 July 2022	17 April 2023	1273	Reform Party (ERE)	K. Kallas II; ERE–I–SDE	XIV (2019)	President; Alar Karis (2021–Present)
19	Kaja Kallas (b. 1977); 19th prime minister	17 April 2023	22 July 2024	1273	Reform Party (ERE)	K. Kallas III; ERE–E200–SDE	XV (2023)	President; Alar Karis (2021–Present)
20	Kristen Michal (b. 1975); 20th prime minister	22 July 2024	Incumbent	764	Reform Party (ERE)	Michal; ERE–E200–SDE; ERE–E200 (Note: The Social Democratic Party (SDE) was asked to leave the coalition on 10 March 2025.)	XV (2023)	President; Alar Karis (2021–Present)

== Statistics ==
=== Time in office ===
A total of 24 people have headed the Government of Estonia, 13 before and 11 after the Soviet occupation. Konstantin Päts headed the government for the longest, a total of 3,563 days during six different terms (2,059 days without his authoritarian era). Andrus Ansip is the second longest office holder with 3,271 days, having been democratically in office longer than Päts.

The shortest time in office was for Ado Birk, when he served as prime minister for only three days and never actually stepping into office. Acting prime minister Otto Tief was in office for 8 days between the German and Soviet occupations in 1944. Ants Piip, August Rei, Jüri Uluots, Juhan Kukk, Friedrich Karl Akel and Jüri Jaakson were also in office for less than a year.

=== Number and length of terms ===
Konstantin Päts served a total of six terms, although his sixth term turned into an authoritarian regime. Jaan Tõnisson was in office four times, although there was just one full day of Ado Birk's cabinet between his first two terms. Otto August Strandman, Jaan Teemant, Karl August Einbund (named Kaarel Eenpalu during his second term in the semi-authoritarian era), Tiit Vähi (first term during the interim period) and Mart Laar all served two terms in office.

Longest average term lengths are all in the reindependence period with Andrus Ansip in the lead (3,271 days), Jüri Ratas second (1,525 days) and Kaja Kallas third (1,273 days). Longest interwar average term is held by Konstantin Päts (594 days). During the interwar democratic era however, longest average term was achieved by Jaan Teemant (439 days), followed by Otto August Strandman (389 days) and by Konstantin Päts himself (383 days).

The era before occupation had the shortest average term lengths with the two extremes of Ado Birk (3 days) and Otto Tief (8 days), but also Ants Piip with 92 days. Jaan Tõnisson also had an average term length of only 216 days. Andres Tarand (with 161 days) and Siim Kallas (with 438 days) have the shortest average term lengths during the reindependence era.

=== Age at assuming office ===
Mart Laar was only 32 years old when he became prime minister in 1992. Ado Birk, Ants Piip, Juhan Kukk, Taavi Rõivas, Edgar Savisaar, Mart Laar (2nd term in 1999) and Juhan Parts were also in their 30s when appointed. Jaan Tõnisson was 64 when stepping into office in 1933. The rest were in their 40s or 50s when assuming office, average age at appointment is 48.
