= State Elder of Estonia =

Head of State of Estonia, 1920-1937

The State Elder (Estonian: riigivanem), sometimes also translated as Head of State, was the official title of the Estonian head of state from 1920 to 1937. He combined some of the functions held by a president and prime minister in most other democracies.

According to the 1920 Estonian Constitution, which was enforced by the "Constitution of the Republic of Estonia, the Referendum Act and the Citizens’s Initiative Act Implementation Act" on July 2, 1920, after being approved by the Constituent Assembly on June 16, 1920 (Riigi Teataja August 9, 1920 No. 113/114), the Government of the Republic consisted of the riigivanem (State Elder) and Ministers (Section 58).

The responsibilities of the State Elder were representing the Republic of Estonia, administration and co-ordination of the activities of the Government of the Republic, chairing the Government meetings; the State Elder had the right to make inquiries about the activities of the Ministers (Section 62). The Government of the Republic appointed one of its members the Deputy of the Elder of State.

In practice, the State Elder had very little power. The 1920 constitution was radically parliamentarian in character, and the State Elder could be voted out of office at any time. This limited his ability to play a balancing role between the government and the legislature.

With the 1934 constitution, the institution saw a reform and it became the equivalent of a president only as a separate head of government was to be elected. The 1934 coup by Konstantin Päts resulted in the institution never coming to real life as he ruled as the Prime Minister in Duties of the State Elder until 1937.

== List of state elders of the Republic of Estonia ==
=== 1920–1934 ===
Portrait	Name	Term of office			Political party	Cabinet	Riigikogu (Election)
Portrait	Name	Took office	Left office	Days	Political party	Cabinet	Riigikogu (Election)
The 1920 Constitution replaced the office of Prime Minister.
1	Ants Piip (1884–1942); 1st State Elder	20 December 1920	25 January 1921	92	Labour Party (ETE)	Piip; ETE	Constituent; Assembly (1919)
2	Konstantin Päts (1874–1956); 2nd State Elder	25 January 1921	21 November 1922	666	Farmers' Assemblies (PK)	Päts I PK–ETE–ERE–KRE; PK–(ETE)–ERE–KRE; PK–ERE–KRE (Note: The Estonian Labour Party (ETE) left the coalition on 13 October 1921. Its ministers resigned on 20 October 1921.)	I (1920)
3	Juhan Kukk (1885–1942); 3rd State Elder	21 November 1922	2 August 1923	255	Labour Party (ETE)	Kukk; ETE–PK–ERE; ETE–PK–(ERE) (Note: The Minister of Internal Affairs Karl August Einbund, the only representative of the Estonian People's Party (ERE) in the coalition, left the party on 5 March 1923. His former party decided to remain in the coalition without any ministerial positions.)	I (1920)
4	Konstantin Päts (1874–1956); 4th State Elder (2nd term)	2 August 1923	26 March 1924	238	Farmers' Assemblies (PK)	Päts II; PK–KRE–ERE–ETE; PK–KRE–ERE–(ETE); PK–KRE–ERE (Note: The Estonian Labour Party (ETE) left the coalition on 14 February 1924. Its ministers remained in office until 19 February 1924.)	II (1923)
5	Friedrich Karl Akel (1871–1941); 5th State Elder	26 March 1924	16 December 1924	266	Christian People's Party (KRE)	Akel; KRE–ETE–ERE	II (1923)
6	Jüri Jaakson (1870–1942); 6th State Elder	16 December 1924	15 December 1925	365	People's Party (ERE)	Jaakson; ERE–PK–ESDTP–ETE–KRE; ERE–PK–ESTP–ETE–KRE (Note: The Estonian Social Democratic Workers' Party (ESDTP) merged with the Independent Socialist Workers' Party (ISTP) and formed the Estonian Socialist Workers' Party (ESTP) on 9 April 1925 and the new party remained in the government.)	II (1923)
7	Jaan Teemant (1872–1941?); 7th State Elder	15 December 1925	23 July 1926	725	Farmers' Assemblies (PK)	Teemant I PK–ETE–KRE–ARVK; PK–ETE–KRE–ARVK–RVP (Note: The National Liberal Party (RVP) joined the coalition on 12 January 1926.)	II (1923)
7	Jaan Teemant (1872–1941?); 7th State Elder	23 July 1926	4 March 1927	725	Farmers' Assemblies (PK)	Teemant II; PK–ARVK–KRE–ERE–ÜMSL	III (1926)
7	Jaan Teemant (1872–1941?); 7th State Elder	4 March 1927	9 December 1927	725	Farmers' Assemblies (PK)	Teemant III; PK–ARVK–ERE–KRE–ÜMSL	III (1926)
8	Jaan Tõnisson (1868–1941?); 8th State Elder	9 December 1927	4 December 1928	362	People's Party (ERE)	Tõnisson III; ERE–PK–ARVK–ETE	III (1926)
9	August Rei (1886–1963); 9th State Elder	4 December 1928	9 July 1929	218	Socialist Workers' Party (ESTP)	Rei; ESTP–ARVK–ETE–KRE	III (1926)
10	Otto August Strandman (1875–1941); 10th State Elder	9 July 1929	12 February 1931	584	Labour Party (ETE)	Strandman II; ETE–ARVK–PK–KRE–ERE	IV (1929)
11	Konstantin Päts (1874–1956); 11th State Elder (3rd term)	12 February 1931	19 February 1932	373	Farmers' Assemblies (PK)	Päts III; PK–ERE–ESTP; PK–ERE/(KRE)–ESTP; PK/(PAVK)–ERE/(KRE)–ESTP; PK/(PAVK)–RKE–ESTP (Note: The parliamentary group of the Estonian People's Party (ERE) merged with the parliamentary group of the Christian People's Party (KRE) on 28 October 1931 and the parliamentary group of the Farmers' Assemblies (PK) with the parliamentary group of the Settlers', State Tenants' and Smallholders' Group (PAVK) on 26 January 1932, with both party coalitions remaining in the government. The Estonian People's Party (ERE) and the Christian People's Party (KRE), already in a party coalition, merged with the Estonian Labour Party (ETE) and formed the National Centre Party (RKE) on 29 January 1932. The party remained in the government.)	IV (1929)
12	Jaan Teemant (1872–1941?); 12th State Elder (2nd term)	19 February 1932	19 July 1932	152	Farmers' Assemblies (PK)	Teemant IV; PK/PAVK–RKE; ÜPE–RKE (Note: The Farmers' Assemblies (PK) and the Settlers', State Tenants' and Smallholders' Group (PAVK), already in a party coalition, merged and formed the United Farmers' Party (ÜPE) on 29 February 1932. The new party remained in the coalition.)	IV (1929)
12	Jaan Teemant (1872–1941?); 12th State Elder (2nd term)	19 February 1932	19 July 1932	152	United Farmers' Party (ÜPE)	Teemant IV; PK/PAVK–RKE; ÜPE–RKE	IV (1929)
13	Karl August Einbund (later Kaarel Eenpalu) (1888–1942); 13th State Elder	19 July 1932	1 November 1932	106	United Farmers' Party (ÜPE)	Einbund I ÜPE–RKE (Note: As Karl August Einbund Estonianized his name into Kaarel Eenpalu, his two cabinets are therefore known as Einbund I and Eenpalu II cabinets.)	V (1932)
14	Konstantin Päts (1874–1956); 14th State Elder (4th term)	1 November 1932	18 May 1933	199	United Farmers' Party (ÜPE)	Päts IV; ÜPE–RKE–ESTP	V (1932)
15	Jaan Tõnisson (1868–1941?); 15th State Elder (2nd term)	18 May 1933	21 October 1933	157	National Centre Party (RKE)	Tõnisson IV; RKE–ÜPE	V (1932)
16	Konstantin Päts (1874–1956); 16th State Elder (5th term)	21 October 1933	24 January 1934	1,647	Farmers' Assemblies (PK) (Note: All political parties were banned on 20 March 1935.)	Päts V non-party coalition (Note: Although Konstantin Päts resigned as President-Regent on 24 April 1938 to become the President on the same day, his cabinet remained temporarily in office until 9 May 1938, headed by acting Prime Minister Kaarel Eenpalu.)	V (1932)
The 1934 Constitution divided the office of State Elder between a new office called State Elder and a Prime Minister.

=== 1934–1937 (acting) ===
Portrait	Name	Term of office			Political party	Cabinet	Riigikogu (Election)	Separate head of government
Portrait	Name	Took office	Left office	Days	Political party	Cabinet	Riigikogu (Election)	Separate head of government
The 1934 Constitution divided the office of State Elder between a new office called State Elder and a Prime Minister.
—	Konstantin Päts (1874–1956); 6th Prime Minister (in duties of the State Elder)	24 January 1934	3 September 1937	1,319	Farmers' Assemblies (PK)	Päts V non-party coalition	V (1932)	Prime Minister in duties of the State Elder; Konstantin; Päts
—	Konstantin Päts (1874–1956); 6th Prime Minister (in duties of the State Elder)	24 January 1934	3 September 1937	1,319	None (Note: Was member of the Patriotic League which was the only sanctioned political organization, but which cannot be considered a political party per se.)	Päts V non-party coalition	Parliament disbanded (Note: The "Era of Silence" began with Konstantin Päts' self-coup on 12 March 1934. The Riigikogu approved of the coup retroactively on 15 March 1934. The Riigikogu was thereafter not convened after 2 October 1934. It was officially disbanded on 1 January 1938.)	Prime Minister in duties of the State Elder; Konstantin; Päts
The Amendment Act of the 1938 Constitution temporarily merged the offices of State Elder and Prime Minister into President-Regent.

== See also ==
- President of Estonia
- Prime Minister of Estonia
- Riigihoidja
