= 1932 Estonian parliamentary election =

- 23 May 1932

100 seats in the Riigikogu 51 seats needed for a majority
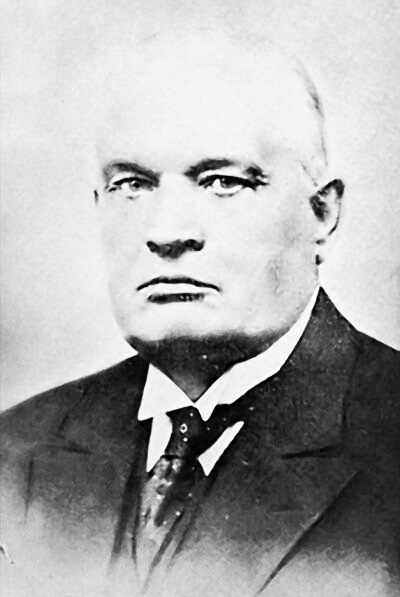

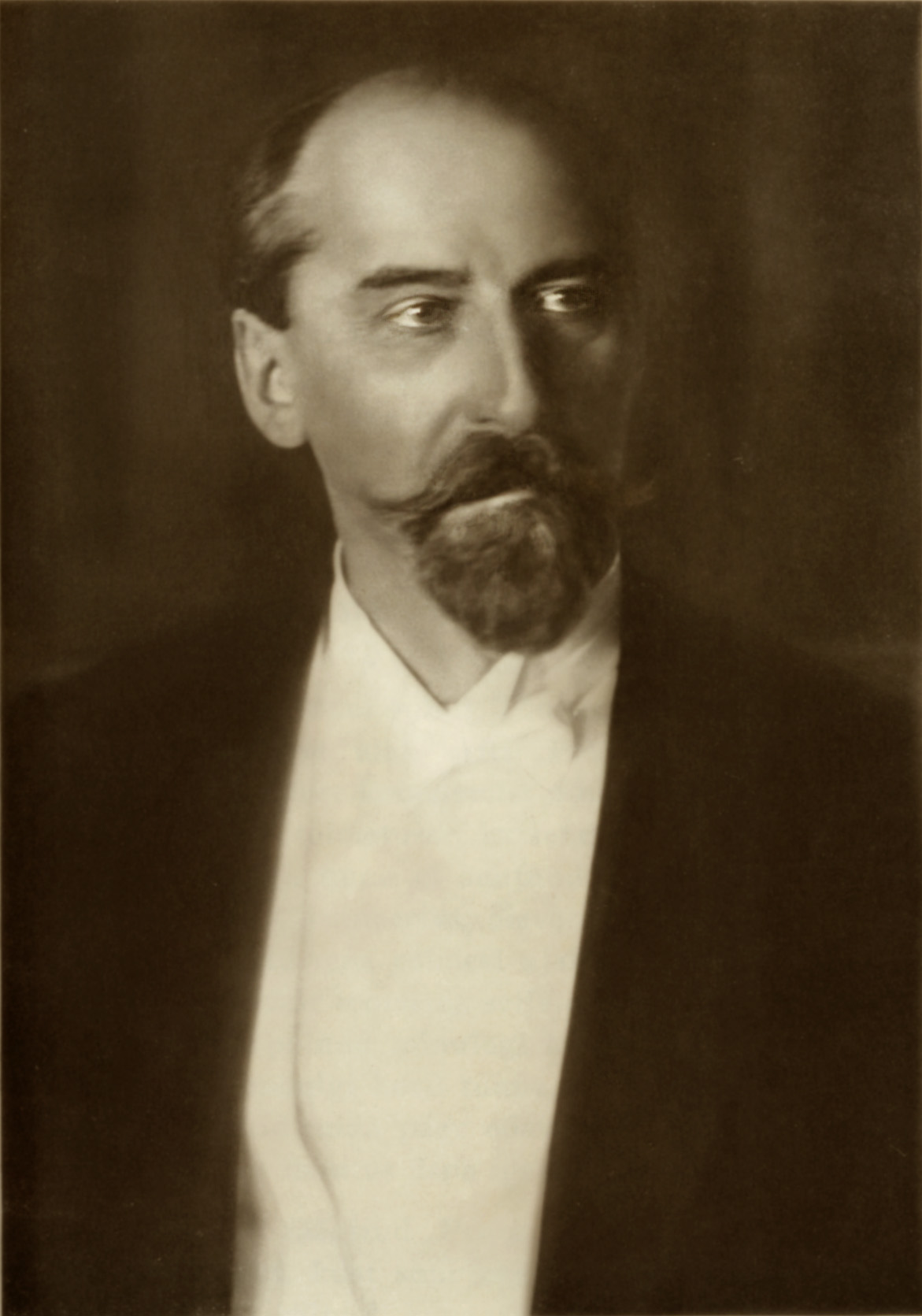

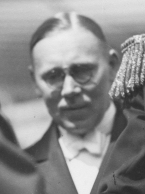
	First party	Second party	Third party
Leader	Konstantin Päts	Jaan Tõnisson	August Rei
Party	AVK	RKE	ESTP
Last election	38 seats	26 seats	25 seats
Seats won	42	23	22
Seat change	▲4	▼3	▼3
Popular vote	199,035	110,662	104,662
Percentage	39.8%	22.1%	20.9%
State Elder before election
Jaan Teemant
AVK
State Elder after election
Karl August Einbund
AVK

Parliamentary elections were held in Estonia between 21 and 23 May 1932.

The 42 seats captured by the unified agrarian party during these elections marked the highest number of seats won by any single political party during Estonia's interwar independence period.

== Background ==
Before the elections major shifts occurred in the political landscape. The Farmers' Assemblies (mostly backed by the "old farmers" and those somewhat more conservative and economically right-wing) and Settlers' Party (patriotic left-of-centre agrarian) merged to form the Union of Settlers and Smallholders, whilst the Estonian People's Party, the Christian People's Party, the Labour Party and the Landlords' Party merged to form the National Centre Party.

== Results ==
Party	Votes	%	Seats	+/–
Union of Settlers and Smallholders	199,035	39.77	42	+4
National Centre Party	110,662	22.11	23	–3
Estonian Socialist Workers' Party	104,835	20.95	22	–3
Left-wing Workers	25,966	5.19	5	–1
Russian parties	25,246	5.04	5	+3
German-Baltic Party–Swedish People's League	15,527	3.10	3	0
National Union of Labour	9,597	1.92	0	New
Socialist Workers and Peasants–Russian Party	5,191	1.04	0	New
Farmers' Association	4,453	0.89	0	New
Total	500,512	100.00	100	0
Valid votes	500,512	99.33		
Invalid/blank votes	3,388	0.67		
Total votes	503,900	100.00		
Registered voters/turnout	747,528	67.41		
Source: Nohlen & Stöver

Constituency	Settlers and Smallholders	National Centre	Socialists	Communists (Note: The Left-wing Workers party was a front for the Communist Party, which had used umbrella organisations to participate in politics since being banned in 1918.)	Russian	German-Baltic–Swedish	Others
Constituency	%	%	%	%	%	%	%
(1) Tallinn	3.1	42.7	25.5	12.6	2.6	7.8	5.7
(2) Harju County	52.4	21.7	14.0	4.2	1.0	2.8	3.9
(3) Lääne County	59.5	17.5	13.9	1.1	0.3	6.0	1.7
(4) Pärnu County	40.8	23.1	24.1	6.9	0.5	2.8	1.8
(5) Saare County	48.3	12.1	31.4	3.9	0.3	2.3	1.8
(6) Järva County	57.7	13.7	22.8	—	0.3	1.4	4.1
(7) Tartu County	34.3	24.8	27.0	3.9	3.5	3.1	3.4
(8) Viru County	44.5	20.2	11.7	8.4	9.1	1.5	4.6
(9) Viljandi County	49.0	16.2	23.3	4.4	0.3	1.4	5.3
(10) Võru, Valga and Petseri County	45.7	13.3	18.6	1.2	16.1	1.1	3.9
Total	39.77	22.11	20.95	5.19	5.04	3.10	3.84

== See also ==
- V Riigikogu
