= Landlords' Party =

Estonian political party

The Landlords' Party (Estonian: Üleriiklik Majaomanike Seltside Liit, lit. 'National Landlords' Societies Union'), also known as the House Owners' Party, was a political party in Estonia.

== History ==
The party was formed prior to the 1923 parliamentary elections, in which it won two seats in the Riigikogu with 2.2% of the vote. The 1926 elections saw the party increase its vote share to 2.4% and retain both seats.

Closely aligned with the Farmers' Assemblies party, the Landlords Party joined Jaan Teemant's cabinet in July 1926 and remained in government until December 1927. In the 1929 elections the party won three seats with 2.9% of the vote, and in February 1931 they joined Konstantin Päts government.

In February 1932 the party merged into the National Centre Party, which had recently been formed by a merger of the Estonian People's Party, the Christian People's Party and the Estonian Labour Party. The new party won 23 of the 100 seats in the Riigikogu in the elections later in the year.

== Ideology ==
The party represented the interests of private property owners, and advocated classic capitalism.
