= Estonian Socialist Workers' Party =

Estonian political party

The Estonian Socialist Workers' Party (Estonian: Eesti Sotsialistlik Tööliste Partei, ESTP) was a political party in Estonia.

== History ==
The party was established in 1925 as a merger of the Estonian Social Democratic Workers' Party and former members of the Independent Socialist Workers' Party, which had been banned in May 1924 following a Communist takeover. The two parties had won a combined 20 seats in the Riigikogu in the 1923 elections. The 1926 elections saw the new party win 24 seats, making it the largest in the Riigikogu, Although Jaan Teemant of the Farmers' Assemblies party remained Head of State, August Rei of the ESTP became Head of State in December 1928.

The party remained the largest in the Riigikogu after the 1929 elections, in which it won 25 seats, but Otto Strandman of the Estonian Labour Party became prime minister. The 1932 elections saw the party reduced to 22 seats. Following the merger of several other parties to form the Union of Settlers and Smallholders and the National Centre Party, the ESTP was now only the third-largest faction in the Riigikogu.

Along with all others, the party was banned in 1935 following Konstantin Päts's self-coup.
