= National Centre Party =

National Centre Party may refer to:

- National Centre Party (Estonia)
- National Centre Party (Ireland)
