= 1923 Estonian religious education referendum =

17–19 February 1923

Results
Choice	Votes	%
Yes	324,933	71.88%
No	127,119	28.12%
Valid votes	452,052	99.53%
Invalid or blank votes	2,116	0.47%
Total votes	454,168	100.00%
Registered voters/turnout	685,730	66.23%

A referendum on restoring voluntary religious education to state schools was held in Estonia between 17 and 19 February 1923. It was approved by 71.9% of voters with a turnout of 66.2%.

== Background ==
On 5 January 1921 the Christian Democratic Party (KDP) joined Konstantin Päts' Farmers' Assemblies-led the government, and was given the Education ministry portfolio. The following year the KDP caused a split in the government by introducing a bill to provide religious education in state schools, funded by the state. Although the proposal was rejected by the Riigikogu, the party forced a referendum on the issue in early 1923.

== Results ==
Choice	Votes	%
For	324,933	71.9
Against	127,119	28.1
Invalid/blank votes	2,116	–
Total	454,168	100
Registered voters/turnout	685,730	66.2
Source: Nohlen & Stöver

== Aftermath ==
As the referendum was a rejection of government policy, this was considered to be a vote of no confidence on the rest of the government. The Riigikogu was subsequently dissolved and fresh elections called.
