= Swedish People's League in the Baltic Sea Provinces =

Defunct political party in Estonia

Swedish People's League in the Baltic Sea Provinces (Swedish: Svenska Folkförbundet i Östersjöprovinserna; Estonian: Rootsi Rahvaliit) was a political party in Estonia, representing interests of the Swedish minority population.

== History ==
The party was founded in 1917, and began publishing Kustbon the following year. In March 1919, the party held its congress.

Due to the small size of the Swedish minority, the party was unable to have any impact running alone. In the 1929 elections it formed an alliance with the German-Baltic Party, which resulted in a 20% increase in their combined vote share. At the time the party was led by Hans Pöhl, a former members of the Christian People's Party. After Pöhl died in 1930, Mathias Westerblom took over as party leader.

The party had its offices at Riddaregatan (Rüütli) 9, Tallinn, attached to Swedish Saint Michael Parish and the Swedish-language school.

In 1935, the publication Kustbon was banned, as political organizations were no longer allowed to issue publications. Nya Kustbon was founded in its place, as a non-party publication.

== See also ==
- Estonian Swedes
- Swedish People's Party of Finland
- Political parties of minorities
- List of political parties in Estonia
