= Jüri Annusson =

Estonian politician (1884–1965)

Jüri Annusson (11 July 1884 – 1965) was an Estonian politician. He was a member of I Riigikogu, representing the Estonian Labour Party.

In 1920–1921 he was Minister of Education.
