= Johann Kana =

Estonian politician (1882–1934)

Johann Kana (also Johan Kana; 22 March 1882 in Vana-Vändra Parish, Kreis Pernau – 6 January 1934 in Tallinn) was an Estonian politician. He was a member of I and II Riigikogu, starting on 28 October 1925 where he replaced Juhan Kukk.
