= 1926 Estonian parliamentary election =

- 17 May 1926

100 seats in the Riigikogu 51 seats needed for a majority
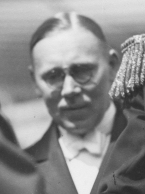

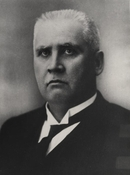

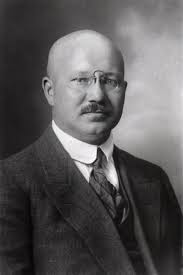
	First party	Second party
Leader	August Rei	Jaan Teemant
Party	ESTP	Farmers' Assemblies
Last election	20 seats	23 seats
Seats won	24	23
Seat change	▲4	Steady
Popular vote	119,914	111,960
Percentage	22.9%	21.4%
	Third party	Fourth party
Leader	Rudolf Penno	Otto Strandman
Party	Settlers	Labour Party
Last election	4 seats	12 seats
Seats won	14	13
Seat change	▲10	▲1
Popular vote	70,702	64,648
Percentage	13.5%	12.3%
State Elder before election
Jaan Teemant
Farmers' Assemblies
State Elder after election
Jaan Teemant
Farmers' Assemblies

Parliamentary elections were held in Estonia between 15 and 17 May 1926. Before the elections, the electoral law was changed to create more stability by introducing a system of bonds and raising the electoral threshold to require a party to win a minimum of two seats.

== Results ==
Party	Votes	%	Seats	+/–
Estonian Socialist Workers' Party	119,914	22.91	24	+4
Farmers' Assemblies	111,960	21.39	23	0
Settlers' Party	70,702	13.51	14	+10
Estonian Labour Party	64,648	12.35	13	+1
Estonian People's Party	38,824	7.42	8	0
Estonian Workers' Party	30,339	5.80	6	–4
Christian People's Party	28,133	5.37	5	–3
Russian parties	17,474	3.34	3	–1
German-Baltic Party	13,278	2.54	2	–1
Landlords' Party	12,355	2.36	2	0
Tenants' Union	6,692	1.28	0	–1
National Liberal Party	4,854	0.93	0	–4
Working People's Union	3,704	0.71	0	0
Country People's Union	603	0.12	0	0
Total	523,480	100.00	100	0
Valid votes	523,480	99.35		
Invalid/blank votes	3,421	0.65		
Total votes	526,901	100.00		
Registered voters/turnout	715,783	73.61		
Source: Nohlen & Stöver

Constituency	Socialists	Farmers	Settlers	Labour	People's	Communists (Note: The Estonian Workers' Party was a front for the Communist Party, which had used umbrella organisations to participate in politics since being banned in 1918.)	Christian	Russian	German-Baltic	Landlords	Others
Constituency	%	%	%	%	%	%	%	%	%	%	%
(1) Tallinn	13.7	8.9	2.6	19.8	4.0	18.6	8.0	2.1	7.2	6.7	8.4
(2) Harju County	7.2	23.8	21.7	18.7	4.6	7.0	9.9	0.4	1.3	1.0	4.5
(3) Lääne County	11.2	28.9	22.2	14.0	7.8	2.6	10.3	0.2	1.5	—	1.4
(4) Pärnu County	25.5	24.9	13.2	17.6	3.8	4.9	3.4	—	2.8	2.4	1.6
(5) Saare County	38.3	30.8	13.5	7.7	1.4	—	5.1	0.2	1.7	0.8	0.4
(6) Järva County	19.2	30.4	17.3	11.6	4.1	4.5	5.9	0.2	1.6	2.3	2.9
(7) Tartu County	28.5	16.9	10.6	5.6	18.8	3.4	3.0	4.8	3.2	3.1	2.0
(8) Viru County	14.1	17.3	19.0	15.2	5.1	6.4	5.7	9.7	1.4	1.8	4.4
(9) Viljandi County	34.5	26.0	12.8	11.1	4.4	2.6	4.8	0.2	1.3	1.8	0.6
(10) Võru, Valga and Petseri County	34.3	25.1	12.4	6.4	8.0	2.3	2.2	6.2	1.0	0.9	1.3
Total	22.91	21.39	13.51	12.35	7.42	5.80	5.37	3.34	2.54	2.36	3.03

== See also ==
- III Riigikogu
