= 1929 Estonian parliamentary election =

- 13 May 1929

100 seats in the Riigikogu 51 seats were needed for a majority
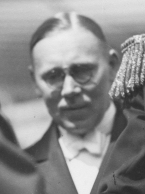

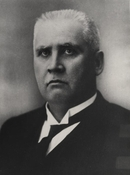

	First party	Second party	Third party
Leader	August Rei	Jaan Teemant	Rudolf Penno
Party	ESTP	Farmers' Assemblies	Settlers
Last election	24 seats	23 seats	14 seats
Seats won	25	24	14
Seat change	▲1	▲1	Steady
Popular vote	121,024	116,715	69,069
Percentage	23.97%	23.11%	13.68%
State Elder before election
August Rei
ESTP
State Elder after election
Otto Strandman
Labour Party

Parliamentary elections were held in Estonia between 11 and 13 May 1929.

== Results ==
Party	Votes	%	Seats	+/–
Estonian Socialist Workers' Party	121,024	23.97	25	+1
Farmers' Assemblies	116,715	23.11	24	+1
Settlers' Party	69,069	13.68	14	0
Estonian Labour Party	51,527	10.20	10	–3
Estonian People's Party	45,033	8.92	9	+1
Estonian Workers' Party	31,094	6.16	6	0
Christian People's Party	20,863	4.13	4	–1
German-Baltic Party–Swedish People's League	16,235	3.21	3	+1
Landlords' Party	14,627	2.90	3	+1
Russian parties	12,797	2.53	2	–1
Workers, Lodgers, Fishermen and Smallholders	6,012	1.19	0	New
Total	504,996	100.00	100	0
Valid votes	504,996	99.39		
Invalid/blank votes	3,110	0.61		
Total votes	508,106	100.00		
Registered voters/turnout	733,250	69.30		
Source: Nohlen & Stöver

Constituency	Socialists	Farmers	Settlers	Labour	People's	Communists (Note: The Estonian Workers' Party was a front for the Communist Party, which had used umbrella organisations to participate in politics since being banned in 1918.)	Christian	German-Baltic–Swedish	Landlords	Russian	Others
Constituency	%	%	%	%	%	%	%	%	%	%	%
(1) Tallinn	19.2	4.6	2.0	18.0	11.2	16.6	7.1	8.9	8.1	1.9	2.4
(2) Harju County	10.1	24.3	22.5	18.9	4.7	6.4	6.6	2.7	2.1	0.5	1.1
(3) Lääne County	12.3	36.5	20.6	11.8	5.7	—	5.4	5.1	1.3	0.2	1.2
(4) Pärnu County	26.0	26.8	11.2	13.7	8.0	5.3	2.8	2.9	2.5	—	1.0
(5) Saare County	36.1	31.8	12.2	5.3	4.8	2.2	4.6	2.5	—	—	0.5
(6) Järva County	17.4	33.2	20.8	9.9	5.0	4.6	3.4	1.5	2.6	—	1.6
(7) Tartu County	34.2	17.7	10.5	3.9	18.1	3.9	2.8	3.2	3.0	1.7	1.0
(8) Viru County	17.2	21.3	19.8	11.7	5.2	9.4	4.6	1.7	2.9	4.5	1.7
(9) Viljandi County	25.2	28.9	16.3	10.0	5.1	5.9	3.6	1.5	2.8	0.2	0.6
(10) Võru, Valga and Petseri County	30.9	27.9	12.0	4.4	8.6	2.7	2.1	1.3	1.1	8.4	0.6
Total	23.97	23.11	13.68	10.20	8.92	6.16	4.13	3.21	2.90	2.53	1.19

== See also ==
- IV Riigikogu
