= Juhan Kukk =

Estonian politician (1885–1942)

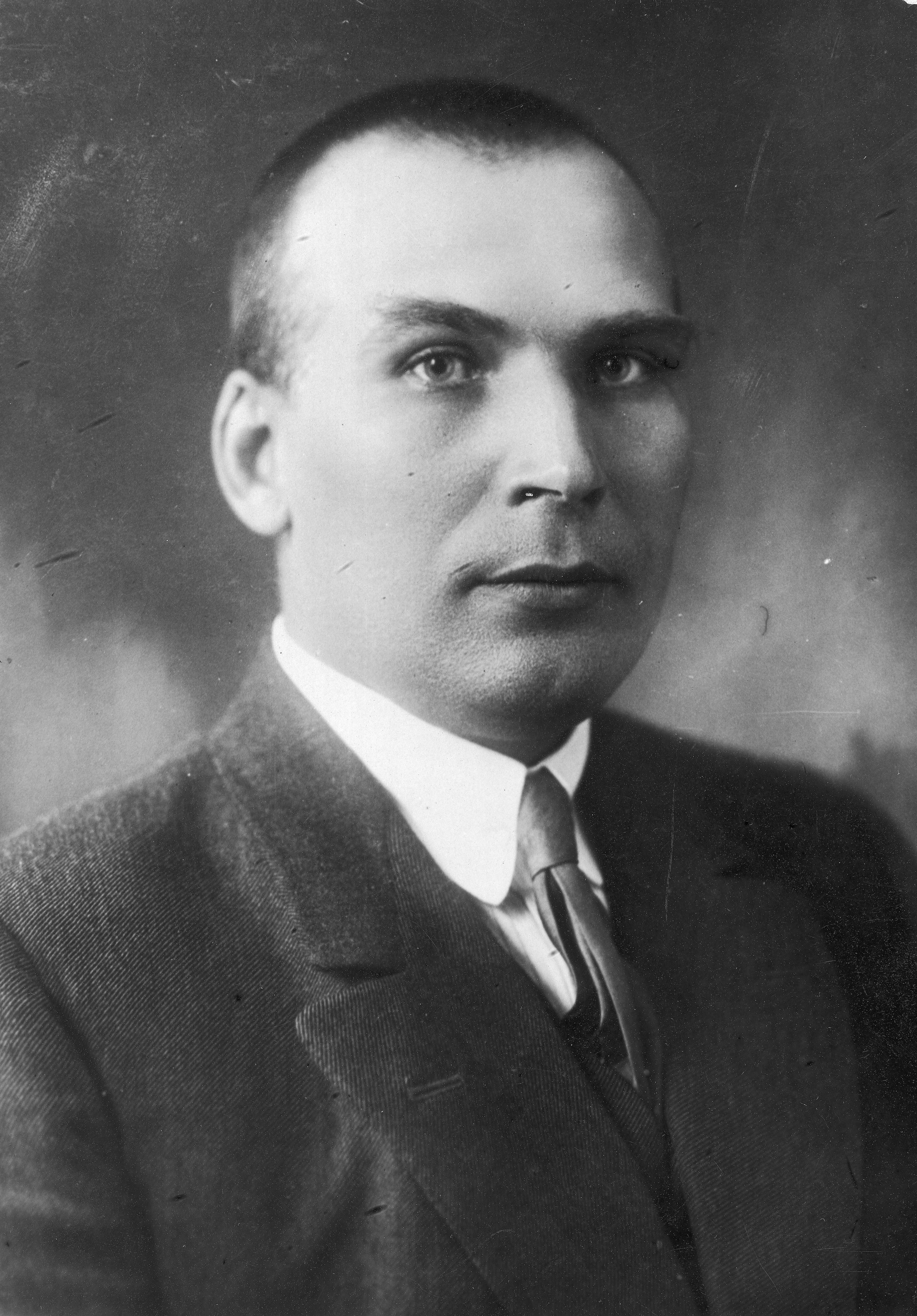
- Juhan Kukk c. 1923–1939

3rd State Elder of Estonia
- In office 21 November 1922 – 2 August 1923
- Preceded by: Konstantin Päts
- Succeeded by: Konstantin Päts

Speaker of the Riigikogu
- In office 18 November 1921 – 20 November 1922
- Preceded by: Otto Strandman
- Succeeded by: Konstantin Päts

Personal details
- Born: 13 April 1885 Käru, Governorate of Estonia, Russian Empire
- Died: 4 December 1942 (aged 57) Kargopol, Arkhangelsk Oblast, Russian SFSR, USSR
- Party: Estonian Labour Party

Juhan (Johann) Kukk (13 April [O.S. 1 April] 1885 – 4 December 1942) was an Estonian politician.

== Early years ==
Kukk was born in Käru, Salla Parish (now in Väike-Maarja Parish), Wierland County. He graduated from Tartu High School of Sciences, then studied in the Commerce Department of the Riga Polytechnical School in 1904–1910 and eventually graduated with a first-degree diploma in Germany.

== Political career ==
Kukk headed the financial department of the Estonian Provincial Assembly in 1917–1918, served as Financial and State Property Minister of the Estonian Provisional Government in 1918–1919, was Minister of Finance of the Republic of Estonia in 1919–1920, and then Minister of Commerce and Industry in 1920–1921.

He was a member of the I and II Riigikogu from 1920 to 1926. From 18 November 1921 to 20 November 1922, he was also Speaker of the Riigikogu. He resigned as Speaker upon being appointed State Elder, an office he held until 2 August 1923. After Kukk left the Riigikogu, he was succeeded by Johann Kana.

Kukk was an active promoter of the cooperative movement, and also served as chairman of the council of the Estonian Cooperative Union, Director of the Central Union of the Estonian Consumers Union, and for some time also as chairman of the board of the latter.

Aside from his career in politics, Kukk also worked as a banker. In 1920, he became chairman of the board of the Estonian People's Bank, and he served as director of the Bank of Estonia from 1924 to 1926.

== Arrest and death ==
After the Soviet Union occupied Estonia and the other Baltic states in 1940, Kukk was arrested by the NKVD and deported to Russia. He died in imprisonment in Kargopol, Arkhangelsk Oblast in 1942.

== Honours ==
=== National honours ===
- Estonia: Cross of Liberty III, 1st class (1920)

Preceded by Otto Strandman	Speaker of the Riigikogu; 1921–1922	Succeeded by Konstantin Päts
Preceded by Konstantin Päts	State Elder of Estonia; 1922–1923	Succeeded by Konstantin Päts
