= Jüri Jaakson =

Estonian statesman (1870–1942)

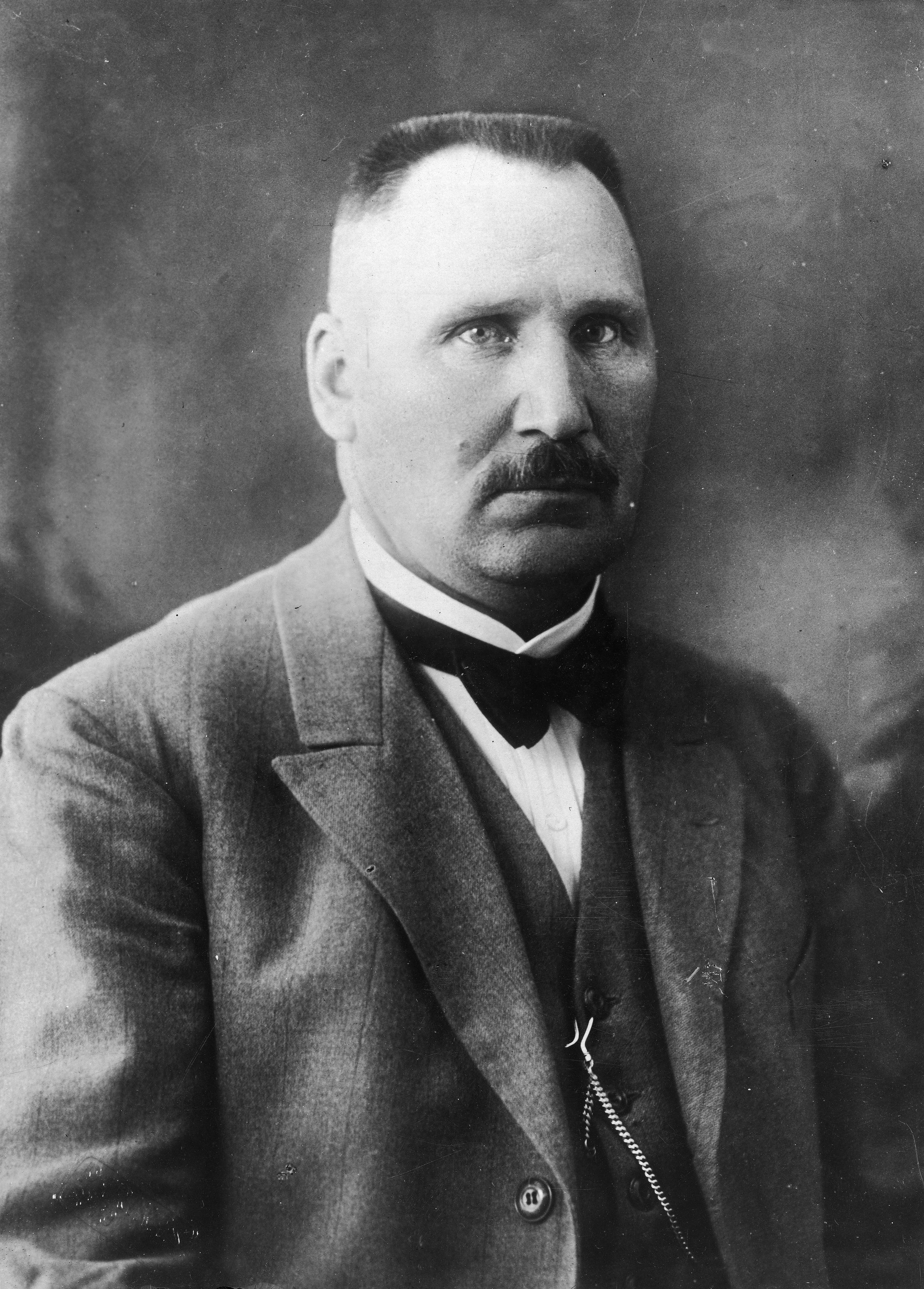
- Jüri Jaakson c. 1924–1925

6th State Elder of Estonia
- In office 16 December 1924 – 15 December 1925
- Preceded by: Friedrich Karl Akel
- Succeeded by: Jaan Teemant

Personal details
- Born: 16 January 1870 Karula, Kreis Fellin, Governorate of Livonia, Russian Empire
- Died: 20 April 1942 (aged 72) Sosva, Sverdlovsk Oblast, Russian SFSR, USSR
- Party: Estonian People's Party

Jüri Jaakson (16 January [O.S. 4 January] 1870 – 20 April 1942) was an Estonian lawyer and statesman.

== Early years ==
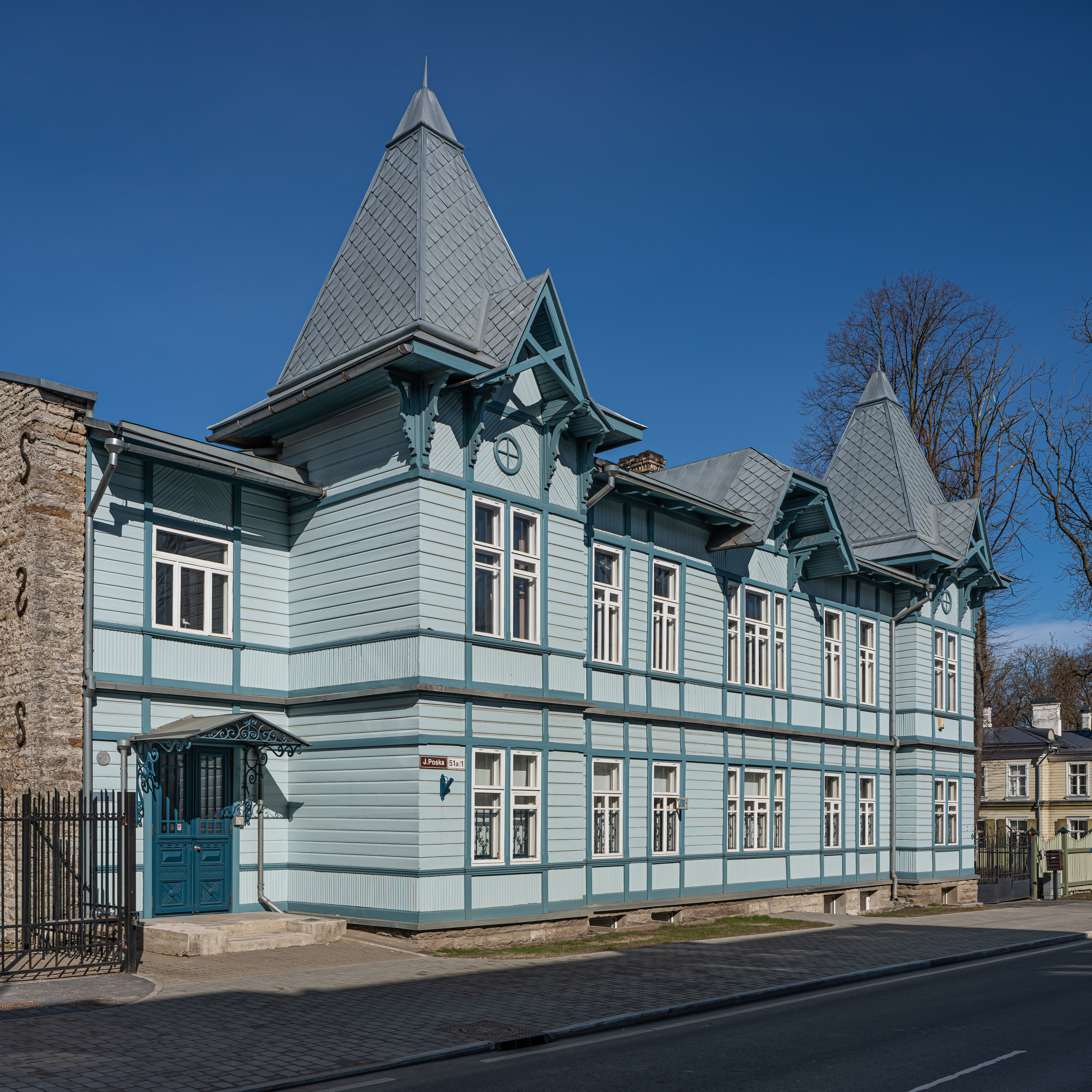
The house in Tallinn where Jaakson and his family lived in 1920s and 1930s

Jaakson was born in Karula. After graduating from the Hugo Treffner Gymnasium in Tartu, he studied law at the University of Tartu from 1892 to 1896. He graduated with a 1st degree diploma (simple graduation) in 1896. In 1897–1914 he worked as a lawyer in Viljandi and Riga. In 1915–1919, Jaakson was a member of board of the Tallinn Municipal Bank (Estonian: Tallinna Linnapank).

== Political career ==
Jaakson was a member and assistant chairman of the Estonian Provincial Assembly in 1917–1918. In 1918, he was general commissioner of the Estonian Provisional Government for expropriating property from the German occupation powers. During 1918–1920 he was Minister of Justice in the government of the Republic of Estonia. In 1920–1932 Jaakson served as a member of parliament (the I–IV Riigikogu).

Between December 1924 to December 1925, Jaakson was State Elder of Estonia. In 1926–1940 he worked as president of the Bank of Estonia and was a member of the National Economic Council. Jaakson was also a member of the National Council, the upper house of the bicameral parliament, in 1938–1940. Jaakson was founder of several banks and participated in several organizations like the Central Society of the North Estonian Farmers (Estonian: Põhja-Eesti Põllumeeste Keskselts) and the Council of the Tallinn Economic Union (Estonian: Tallinna Majandusühisus).

== Arrest and death ==
Following the June 1940 Soviet invasion and occupation of Estonia, Jaakson was imprisoned by the NKVD on 14 June 1941. He was deported to Russia, accused of "counterrevolutionary activities", sentenced to death and executed in Sosva, Sverdlovsk Oblast, Soviet Union, in 1942.

== Honours ==
=== National honours ===
- Estonia: Cross of Liberty III, 1st class (1920)
- Estonia: Order of the Cross of the Eagle, 1st class (1930)

=== Foreign honours ===
- Latvia: Order of the Three Stars, 1st Class with Chain (1925)

Political offices
Preceded by Friedrich Akel	State Elder of Estonia; 1924–1925	Succeeded by Jaan Teemant
Preceded by Artur Uibopuu	Chairman of the Bank of Estonia; 1926–1940	Succeeded by Juhan Vaabel
