= Settlers' Party =

Estonian political party

Settlers' Association Asunikkude koondis
- Founder: Oskar Köster
- Founded: 1923
- Split from: Farmers' Assemblies
- Succeeded by: Union of Settlers and Smallholders
- Ideology: Agrarianism
- Political position: Centre

The Settlers' Party (Estonian: Asunikkude partei) was a political party in Estonia.

== History ==
The party was established in 1923 as the Settlers' Group (Asunikkude koondis), a breakaway from Farmers' Assemblies. The 1923 elections saw it won four seats in the Riigikogu. In December 1925 it became the Settlers, State Tenants and Smallholders Group (Asunikkude, Riigirentnikkude ja Väikepõllupidajate Koondis), and in the 1926 elections it won 14 seats, becoming the third largest party in the Riigikogu. It retained its 14-seat strength in the 1929 elections.

The party was renamed again in 1931, becoming the Farmers' Settlers and Smallholders' Group (Põllumeeste, Asunikkude ja Väikemaapidajate Koondis). Prior to the 1932 elections the party merged with the Farmers' Assemblies to form the Union of Settlers and Smallholders, with the new party winning 42 of the 100 seats.

The party was re-established in 1933 after breaking away from the Union, and joined the government led by the National Centre Party's Jaan Tõnisson. The activities of all political parties were suspended in 1935, but two Settlers' Party members won seats in the 1938 elections. For decades after the 1944 Soviet invasion and occupation of Estonia, the party remained active in exile in Sweden.
