= Kaarel Eenpalu =

Estonian politician (1888–1942)

Kaarel Eenpalu (Note: Kaarel Eenpalu was named Karl August Einbund until 1935, when he Estonianized his name.)
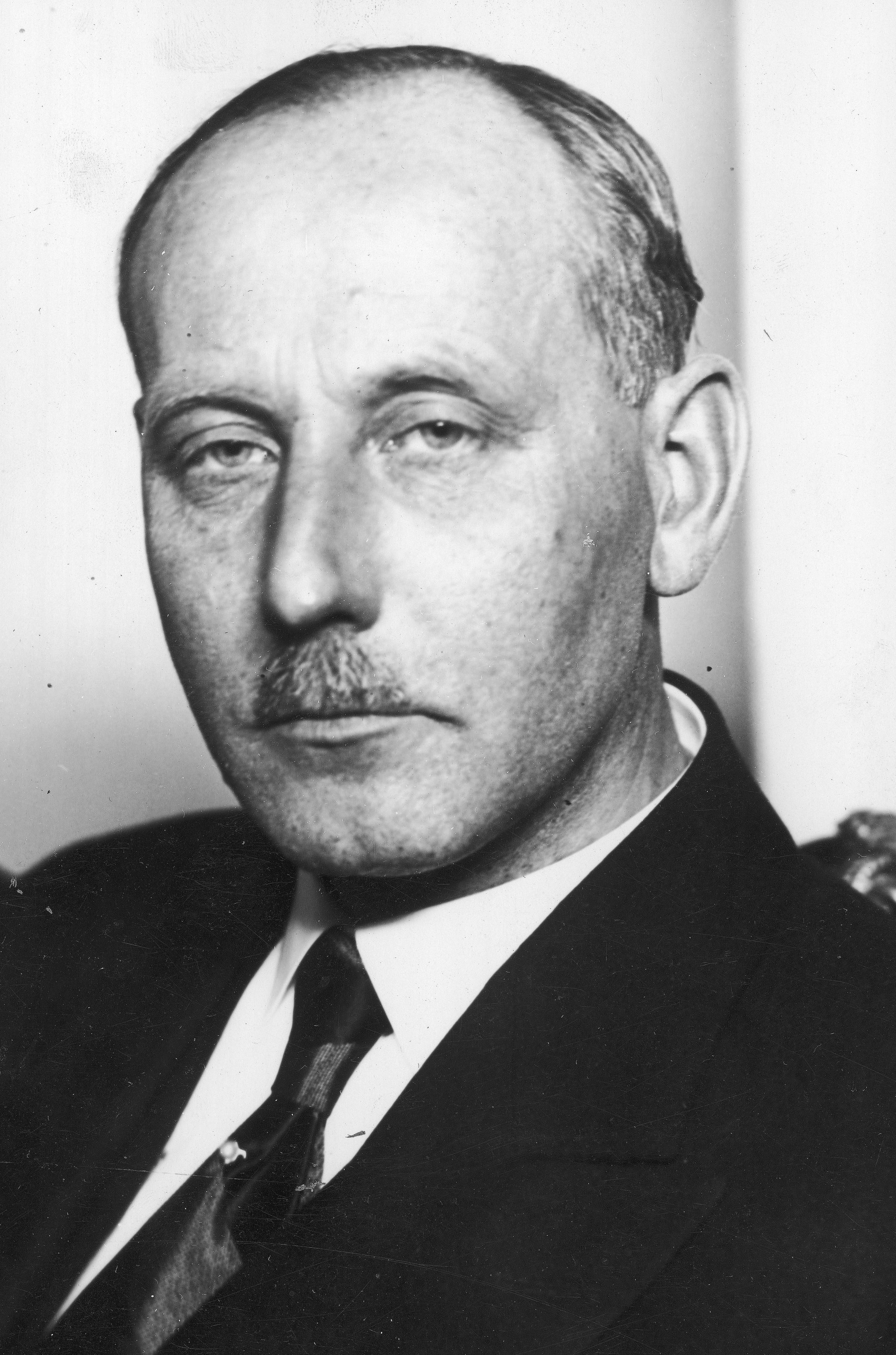
- Kaarel Eenpalu in 1934

Prime Minister of Estonia
- In office 9 May 1938 – 12 October 1939
- President: Konstantin Päts
- Preceded by: Himself as Acting Prime Minister
- Succeeded by: Jüri Uluots

Acting Prime Minister of Estonia
- In office 24 April 1938 – 9 May 1938
- President: Konstantin Päts
- Preceded by: Konstantin Päts as President-Regent
- Succeeded by: Himself as Prime Minister

13th State Elder of Estonia
- In office 19 July 1932 – 1 November 1932
- Preceded by: Jaan Teemant
- Succeeded by: Konstantin Päts

Personal details
- Born: Karl August Einbund; 28 May 1888 Vesneri Parish (now Tartu Parish), Kreis Dorpat, Livonia, Russian Empire
- Died: 27 January 1942 (aged 53) Kirov Oblast, Soviet Union
- Party: Estonian People's Party
- Spouse: Linda Eenpalu
- Education: University of Tartu; Imperial Moscow University

Kaarel Eenpalu (until 1935 Karl August Einbund; 28 May [O.S. 16 May] 1888 – 27 January 1942) was an Estonian journalist, politician and head of state, who served as 7th Prime Minister of Estonia.

== Early years ==
Eenpalu was educated at the Hugo Treffner Gymnasium in Tartu. Between 1909 and 1914 he studied law at the University of Tartu, and later graduated from Imperial Moscow University.

From 1910 to 1912 and in 1915 he was member of the editorial board of the Postimees ("The Postman") daily in Tartu, in 1918 editor of Postimees, in 1920 editor-in-chief of Tallinna Teataja ("The Tallinn Gazette") daily, and in 1924 editor-in-chief of the Kaja ("Echo") newspaper.

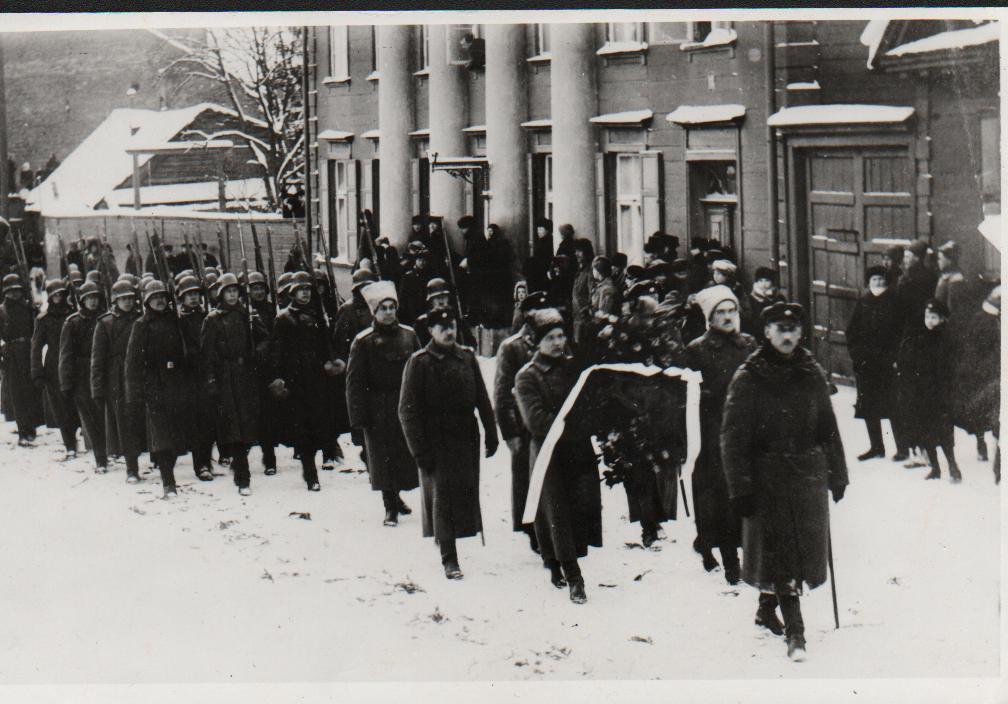
Eenpalu at the head of the procession of Julius Kuperjanov's funeral in Tartu, 1919.

Eenpalu was active in World War I, serving as a battery commander in the 1st Estonian Artillery Regiment in 1917 and 1918. During the Estonian War of Independence in 1918–1919, he first commanded the Tartu High School students' battalion, and then a battery in the 2nd Estonian Artillery Regiment.

== Political career ==
Eenpalu was a member of the Estonian Constituent Assembly (Asutav Kogu, 1919–1920), member of the unicameral parliament (Riigikogu, 1920–1937), member of the lower house (Riigivolikogu) of the bicameral parliament since 1938, and held a series of high government offices in the independent Republic of Estonia in 1918–1940. In 1919–1920 he was State Controller. In 1920, 1921–1924, and 1924–1926 he held the position of the Minister of Internal Affairs, and can thus be considered a founder of the Estonian Police. From 22 June 1926 to 19 July 1932 and from 18 May 1933 to 29 August 1934 he was Speaker of the III, IV and V Riigikogu.

From 19 July to 1 November 1932 he was the head of state (Riigivanem, literally "Elder of State"). In 1934–1938 he was again Minister of Internal Affairs, and in 1938–1939 he was the Prime Minister of Estonia.

== Arrest and death ==
After the Soviet Union occupied Estonia and the other Baltic states on 17 June 1940, Eenpalu, along with a number of other leading Estonian politicians, was arrested in July 1940 and subsequently deported to Russia. He died in 1942 in Vyatlag, a Soviet prison camp in Kirov Oblast.

== Personal life ==
Kaarel Eenpalu was married to women's activist Linda Eenpalu. They had three daughters: Helmi-Aino (born 1917), Virve (born 1919), Tiiu-Hilja (born 1921) and Mai-Linda (born 1923). Politician Anne Eenpalu (born 1954) is Kaarel Eenpalu's granddaughter.

== Honours ==
=== National honours ===
- Estonia: Order of the Estonian Red Cross, 2nd class (1927)
- Estonia: Order of the Cross of the Eagle, 1st class (1930)
- Estonia: Order of the Estonian Red Cross, 1st class (1935)
- Estonia: Order of the White Star, 1st class (1938)
- Estonia: Order of the National Coat of Arms, 1st class (1938)

== Notes ==
| Preceded by Aleksander Oinas | Auditor General of Estonia; 1919–1920 | Succeeded by Aleksander Oinas |
| Preceded by August Rei | Speaker of the Riigikogu; 1926–1932 | Succeeded by Jaan Tõnisson |
| Preceded by Jaan Teemant | State Elder of Estonia; 1932 | Succeeded by Konstantin Päts |
| Preceded by Jaan Tõnisson | Speaker of the Riigikogu; 1933–1934 | Succeeded by Rudolf Penno |
| Vacant Merged into the office of President-Regent Title last held by Konstantin Päts | Prime Minister of Estonia; 1938–1939 | Succeeded by Jüri Uluots |
