= National Centre Party (Estonia) =

Estonian political party

National Centre Party Rahvuslik Keskerakond
- Founded: October 1931
- Dissolved: 1935
- Merger of: Estonian People's Party (1931); Christian People's Party (1931); Estonian Labour Party (1932); Landlords' Party (1932); Economic Group (1932)
- Ideology: Centrism; Corporatism (Ideologies of the parties that merged)

The National Centre Party (Estonian: Rahvuslik Keskerakond, RKE) was a political party in Estonia.

== History ==
The party was established in October 1931 as the United Nationalists Party by a merger of the Estonian People's Party and the Christian People's Party. In January 1932 the Estonian Labour Party joined the merger, with the party becoming the National Centre Party. In February the Landlords' Party also merged into the party.

Between them the four parties held a combined 26 seats in the Riigikogu. In the 1932 elections the new party won only 23 seats, losing to the Union of Settlers and Smallholders, which had recently been established by a merger of the Farmers' Assemblies party and the Settlers' Party.

Along with all other political parties, its activities were suspended in 1935 (a year after the 1934 Konstantin Päts' government had declared a nationwide state of emergency).

In the 1938 elections, two former RKE members were elected to parliament.
