= August Rei =

Estonian politician

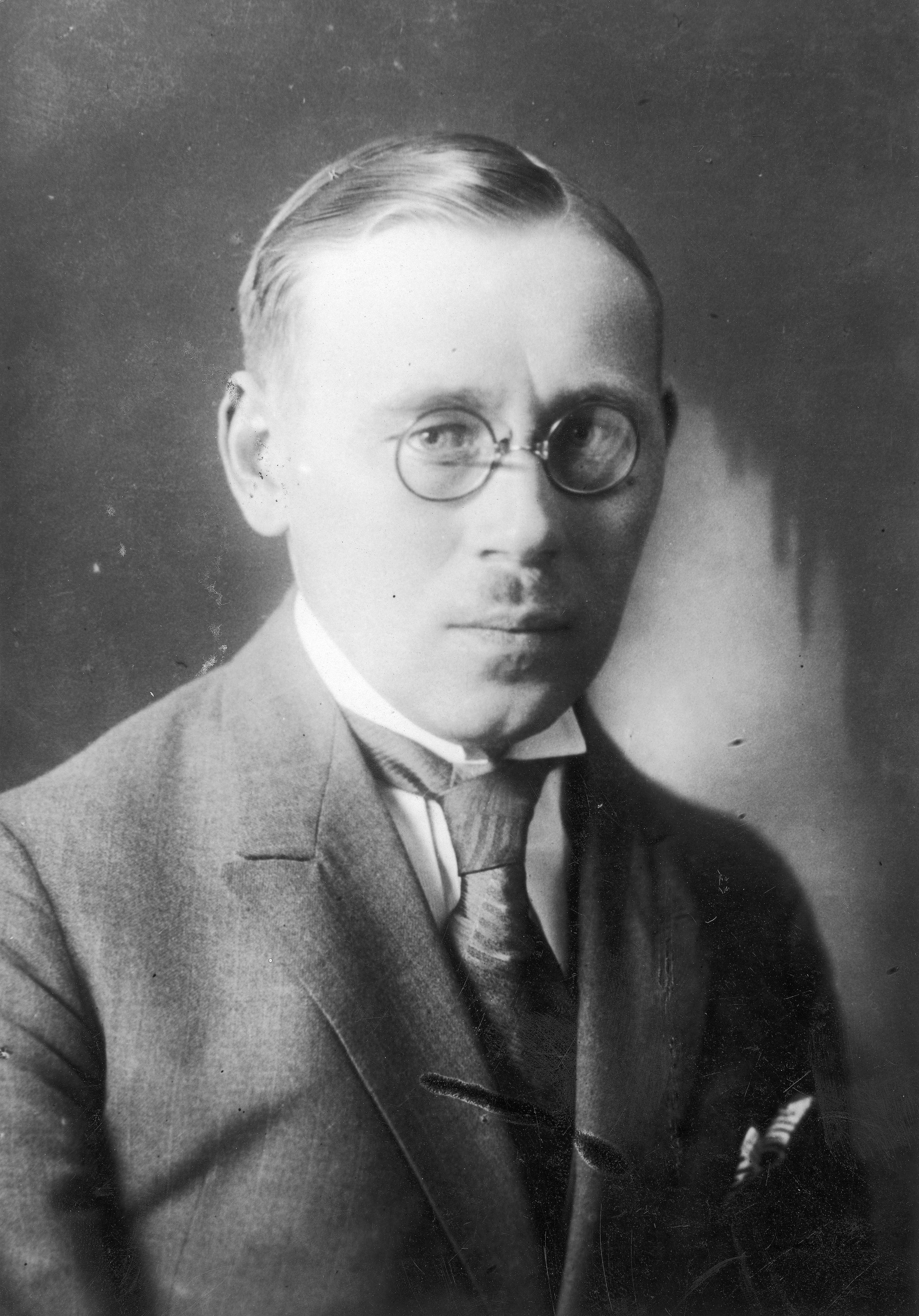
- August Rei c. 1926–1930

Prime Minister in duties of the President of the Estonian government-in-exile
- In office 9 January 1945 – 29 March 1963
- Preceded by: Jüri Uluots
- Succeeded by: Aleksander Warma

9th State Elder of Estonia
- In office 4 December 1928 – 9 July 1929
- Preceded by: Jaan Tõnisson
- Succeeded by: Otto Strandman

Minister of Foreign Affairs of Estonia
- In office 1 November 1932 – 18 May 1933
- Preceded by: Mihkel Pung
- Succeeded by: Ants Piip

Personal details
- Born: 22 March 1886 Kurla, Kreis Fellin, Governorate of Livonia, Russian Empire
- Died: 29 March 1963 (aged 77) Stockholm, Sweden
- Party: Estonian Social Democratic Workers' Party; Estonian Socialist Workers' Party
- Education: Saint Petersburg State University

August Rei (22 March [O.S. 10 March] 1886 – 29 March 1963) was an Estonian politician. He served as State Elder of Estonia from 1928 to 1929, and as Prime Minister in duties of the President of the Estonian government-in-exile from 1945 to 1963.

== Early life and education ==
August Rei was born in Kurla, Pilistvere parish, Kreis Fellin (now Türi Parish, Järva County). He began studying at Emperor Alexander High School in Tartu, but abandoned his studies there in December 1902, in order to forestall his expulsion after participating in Estonian nationalist circles. He continued his studies at Novgorod State High School, graduating in 1904. In 1904–1905 and 1907–1911, he studied law at Saint Petersburg State University. During this time, he also translated works by socialist theoreticians such as Ferdinand Lassalle, Karl Kautsky and August Bebel to Estonian.

== Beginnings of political influence ==
Rei participated in the Russian Revolution of 1905, taking part in the organization of an uprising at the cruiser Pamiat Azova in July 1906 and operating as an underground activist in Narva. In 1906, he edited the underground paper Sotsiaaldemokraat ("Social Democrat") in Tallinn. Between 1912 and 1913, he was in compulsory army service. In 1913–1914 he worked as a lawyer in Viljandi.

During World War I, Rei served as an artillery officer at the Peter and Paul Fortress in Saint Petersburg in 1914–1917. In 1917–1918 he organized the Estonian national army units, formed by the initiative of Estonian politicians after the Second Russian Revolution in March 1917. Rei was the head of the Judicial Department of the Estonian Military Headquarters, for a short time Secretary of the Higher Military Court, and a second lieutenant from 1918.

In 1917–1919, he was editor-in-chief of the paper Sotsiaaldemokraat, and between 1927 and 1928 he was the editor of Rahva Sõna ("Word of the People"). Rei was one of the leaders of the moderate faction of Estonia's social democratic movement. Aside of his later political career, he also worked as a lawyer in Tallinn up to 1936, and defended Ado Birk during his trial in 1927. He received an honorary doctorate in law from Tartu University.

== Estonian independence ==
After the end of the German occupation of Estonia in September 1918, Rei was appointed Minister of Labour and Social Welfare in the Estonian Provisional Government. Between November 1918 and January 1919, he also served as Deputy Prime Minister under Konstantin Päts, and as Acting Minister of Education as a substitute of Karl Luts, as the latter was imprisoned in Russia and unable to exercise his functions. After a government reshuffle in February 1919, Rei served as a legal advisor in the Ministry of Labour and Social Welfare.

Representing the Estonian Social Democratic Workers' Party (ESDWP), Rei was a member of the Estonian Provincial Assembly in 1917–1919, and then of the Estonian Constituent Assembly, where he was also chairman between April 1919 and December 1920. From 1920 to 1937, Rei represented the ESDWP in the I and II Riigikogu, and the Estonian Socialist Workers' Party (ESWP) in the III, IV and V Riigikogu. He was also Chairman of the II Riigikogu between June 1925 and June 1926.

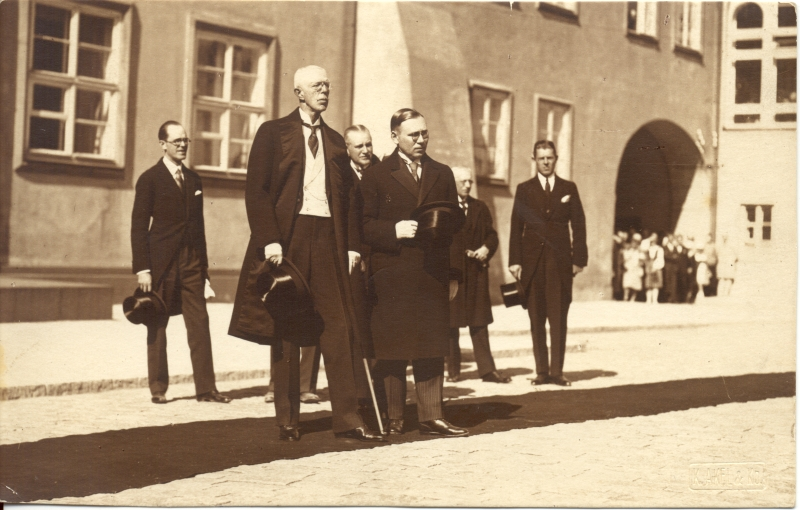
King Gustaf V of Sweden and Elder of State August Rei (right) in Tallinn, 1929

Between December 1928 and July 1929, Rei was State Elder of Estonia; during his term, a trade agreement with the Soviet Union was signed, and he hosted a visit of the King of Sweden Gustaf V to Estonia. Between 1930 and 1934, Rei was chairman of Tallinn City Council, as well as an advisor to the Ministry of Roads. Between November 1932 and May 1933, he served as Minister of Foreign Affairs in the government of Konstantin Päts. Between August 1936 and December 1937 he was Deputy Minister of Foreign Affairs, and then Estonia's envoy to the Soviet Union in 1938–1940.

== Exile and death ==
Following the June 1940 Soviet invasion and occupation of Estonia and the other Baltic states, Rei escaped from Moscow to Stockholm through Riga. Remaining in Sweden for the rest of his life, he was active in several Estonian exile organisations during World War II, and served as Prime Minister in duties of the President of the Estonian government-in-exile from 1945 until his death.

Rei died in Stockholm in 1963. In 2006, his urn, along with the urn of his wife Therese Rei, were moved from Bromma Cemetery in Stockholm to Metsakalmistu Cemetery in Tallinn.

== Honours ==
- Estonia: Cross of Liberty III, 1st class (1920)
- Estonia: Order of the Cross of the Eagle, 1st class (1930)

== Selected bibliography ==
- Sotsialdemokraatia taktika põhimõtted Tallinnas : Tööliste kirjastusühisus, 1921 (Narva : Kärner) (in Estonian)
- Have the Baltic countries voluntarily renounced their freedom : an exposé based on authentic documentary evidence by August Rei. New York : World Association of Estonians, 1944 (in English)
- Have the small nations a right to freedom and independence? by August Rei. London : Boreas, 1946 (in English)
- The drama of the Baltic peoples by August Rei; preface by Eugene Lyons. Stockholm: Vaba Eesti, 1970 (Åbo : Sydvästkusten) (in English)

Political offices
| Preceded by Jaan Tõnisson | Speaker of the Riigikogu; 1925–1926 | Succeeded by Karl Einbund |
| Preceded by Jaan Tõnisson | Head of State of Estonia; 1928–1929 | Succeeded by Otto Strandman |
| Preceded by Mihkel Pung | Minister of Foreign Affairs; 1932–1933 | Succeeded by Ants Piip |
| Preceded by Jüri Uluots | Prime Minister in duties of the President; 1945–1963 | Succeeded by Aleksander Warma |
| Preceded by Ants Piip (not in exile) | Estonian Minister of Foreign Affairs in exile 1944 | Succeeded by Hans Rebane |
Diplomatic posts
| Preceded by August Traksmaa | Ambassador of Estonia to Soviet Union; 1938–1940 | Succeeded by none |
