= Farmers' Assemblies =

Estonian political party

Farmers' Assemblies Põllumeeste Kogud
- President: Konstantin Päts
- Founded: 1917
- Banned: 1935
- Merged into: Union of Settlers and Smallholders (Faction)
- Ideology: Conservatism
- European affiliation: Green International
- Colours: Green

Party flag

The Farmers' Assemblies (Estonian: Põllumeeste Kogud) was a conservative political party in Estonia. Led by Konstantin Päts, it was one of the ruling parties during most of the interwar period.

== History ==
The Rural League (Maarahva Liit) was formed in 1917 following an article in the Postimees newspaper by members of the Southern Estonian Farmers' Central Society, which called for the rural population to form political groups to represent themselves. The new party published the Maaliit newspaper. In the Provincial Assembly elections later in the year the League received 22% of the vote and emerged as the largest party in the Assembly, holding 13 of the 62 seats.

After the elections the party became part of the Democratic Bloc alongside the Estonian Democratic Party and the Estonian Radical Democratic Party. The Bloc received around 23% of the vote in the February 1918 Constituent Assembly elections, which was cancelled. At the time the League was considering inviting the German Army to occupy Estonia to ward off Russian Bolsheviks. Konstantin Päts then joined the League to prevent this idea being implemented, and became its leader.

In the 1919 Constituent Assembly elections, the League performed poorly, winning only eight of the 120 seats and finishing in fourth place. The Estonian Labour Party government subsequently enacted radical land reforms that redistributed land to landless farmers. This policy was opposed by the Rural League, who saw a large increase in support in the 1920 elections amongst the new landowners who had drifted to the right following their gains. The results saw the League finish second with 21 of the 100 seats in the Riigikogu, and Päts became Head of State.

In 1921 the party was reorganised, and renamed the Farmers' Assemblies, with the Maaliit newspaper renamed Kaja. In 1923 a split saw some liberal members leave the party to form the Settlers' Party. The 1923 elections saw the party become the largest in the Riigikogu, winning 23 seats. Päts remained Head of State.

The 1926 elections saw the party retain its 23 seats. Although the Estonian Socialist Workers' Party became the largest faction in the Riigikogu, Farmers' Assemblies member Jaan Teemant remained Head of State, having taken office in December 1925. The party remained the second largest faction in the Riigikogu following the 1929 elections, in which it won 24 seats. However, Otto Strandman of the Labour Party was able to form a government.

Prior to the 1932 elections the party merged with the Settlers' Party to form the Union of Settlers and Smallholders, with the new party winning 42 of the 100 seats.

In 1933 a large conservative faction of the Farmers' Assemblies left the Union to re-establish the party. The activities of political parties were suspended on 6 March 1935, but during the Soviet occupation the party continued in exile in Sweden.
