= Union of Settlers and Smallholders =

Estonian political party

The Union of Settlers and Smallholders (Estonian: Asunikkude ning väikemaapidajate Koondis, AVK) was a political party in Estonia.

== History ==
The party was established in 1932 as a merger of the ruling Farmers' Assemblies party and the Settlers' Party, with the two parties holding a combined 38 seats in the Riigikogu. In the 1932 elections the new party won 42 seats, the most seats ever won in multi-party elections in Estonia. It continued in government, with Kaarel Eenpalu becoming Head of State.

In 1933 it suffered a major split when the large conservative faction of the Farmers' Assemblies left the Union to re-establish their party.

Along with all others, the party was banned in 1935 following Konstantin Päts's self-coup.
