= Estonian Social Democratic Workers' Party =

Estonian political party

Estonian Social Democratic Workers' Party Eesti Sotsiaaldemokraatiline Tööliste Partei
- Leader: August Rei
- Founded: 1905
- Dissolved: 1925
- Merged into: Estonian Socialist Workers' Party
- Ideology: Democratic socialism Estonian nationalism Estonian patriotism Reformism
- Political position: Centre-left to left-wing

The Estonian Social Democratic Workers' Party (Estonian: Eesti Sotsiaaldemokraatiline Tööliste Partei) was a political party in Estonia between 1917 and 1925. The leaders of the party, founded on platforms of patriotism, Estonian independence, and social justice, made a major contribution to the drafting of the first (1920) Constitution of Estonia.

== History ==
Social democracy in Estonia was born at the beginning of the 20th century. Estonian social democracy was influenced by western European ideas of social democracy as well as by Russian ideals. During the Russian Revolution of 1905, social democratic ideas spread and Estonian social democrats formed their party in the summer of 1905 in Tartu.

At this time, the party was named the Estonian Social Democratic Workers Unity (Eesti Sotsiaaldemokraatlik Tööliste Ühendus). The social democrats were the most persecuted party during the czarist era. Their newspapers were closed, their politicians were forced to emigrate (Peeter Speek and Mihkel Martna) or prosecute in underground (August Rei).

In 1917, when parties were again allowed, social democrats formed the Estonian Social Democratic Association (Eesti Sotsiaaldemokraatlik Ühendus). Their views were patriotic and they fought for Estonian independence and social justice. In 1919, they changed their name to the Estonian Social Democratic Workers Party (Eesti Sotsiaaldemokraatlik Tööliste Partei) and won the Constituent Assembly elections with 41 of the 120 seats. In the first parliamentary elections, the following year the party was reduced to third place, before emerging as the second-largest party in the 1923 elections.

In 1925, the party merged with the Estonian Independent Socialist Workers' Party to form the Estonian Socialist Workers' Party. In 1990, the Estonian Socialist Party's Foreign Association merged into the newly formed Estonian Social Democratic Party.
