= Jaan Teemant =

Estonian lawyer and politician

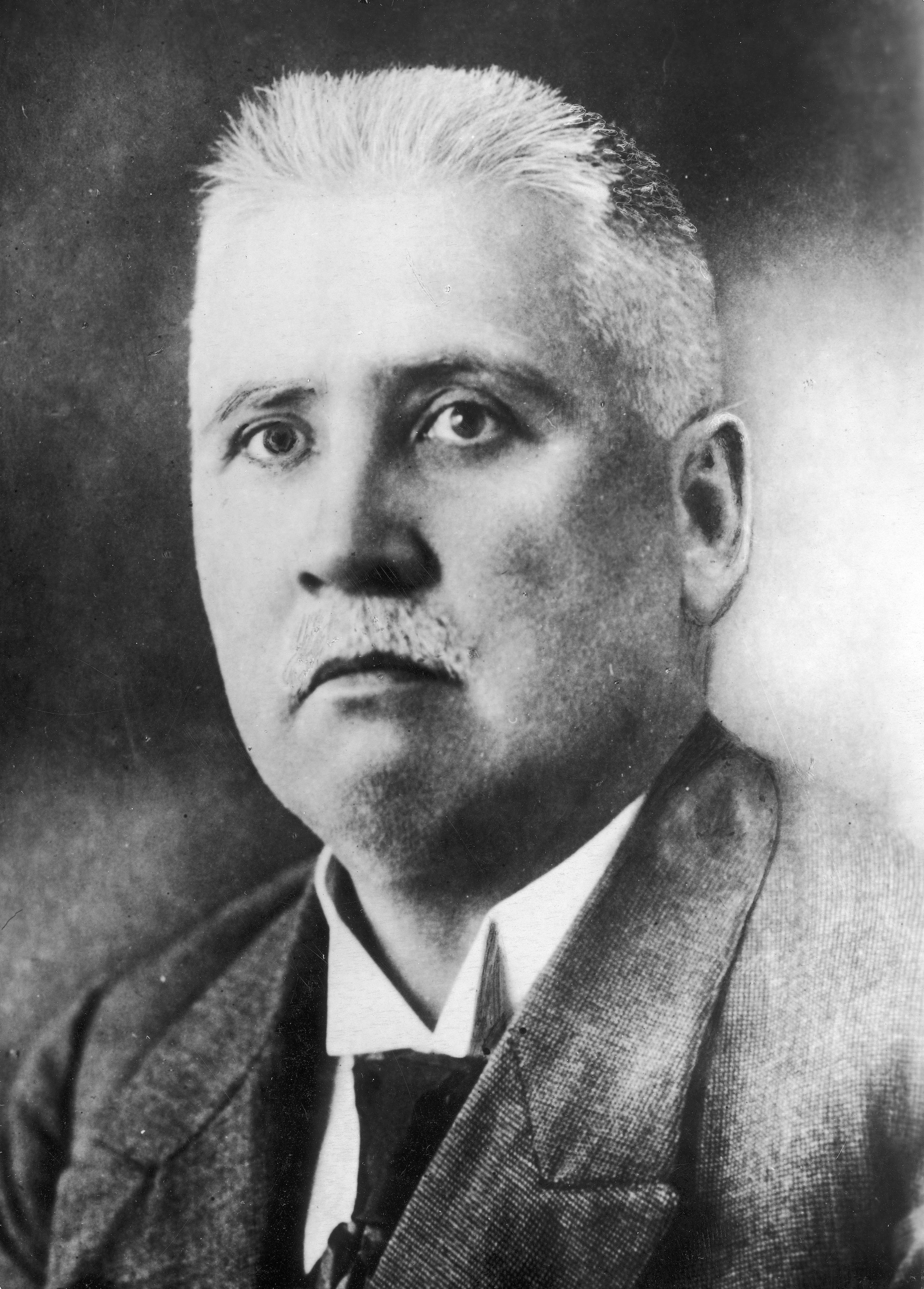
- Jaan Teemant in 1932

7th and 12th State Elder of Estonia
- In office 19 February 1932 – 19 July 1932
- Preceded by: Konstantin Päts
- Succeeded by: Karl August Einbund
- In office 15 December 1925 – 9 December 1927
- Preceded by: Jüri Jaakson
- Succeeded by: Jaan Tõnisson

Personal details
- Born: 12 September 1872 Illuste, Vigala Parish, Governorate of Estonia, Russian Empire
- Died: Possibly 24 July 1941 (aged 68) Tallinn, then part of Estonian SSR, Soviet Union
- Party: Rural League (1917–1920); Farmers' Assemblies (1920–1932); Union of Settlers and Smallholders (1932–1935)
- Education: Saint Petersburg Imperial University

Jaan Teemant (24 September [O.S. 12 September] 1872 – possibly 24 July 1941) was an Estonian lawyer and politician.

== Early years ==
Teemant was born in Illuste (now Paatsalu), Vigala Parish, in present-day Pärnu County. He graduated from Hugo Treffner Gymnasium in Tartu in 1893, and thereafter studied at the Department of Law at Saint Petersburg Imperial University, graduating in 1901. Upon his graduation he returned to Estonia, where he worked as a solicitor in Tallinn.

In 1904–1905, Teemant was a member of the Tallinn Municipal Council. He participated in the 1905 Revolution, and was elected head of the All-Estonian Congress, held in Tartu in November 1905. His activities during the revolution forced him into exile in Switzerland; while there, he was sentenced to death in absentia. After the state of martial law imposed after the revolution was lifted and his death sentence was revoked, Teemant returned to Estonia in 1908. There, he was arrested and held in pretrial detention in 1908–1909, and then sentenced to one and a half years in prison. He served his prison sentence in Saint Petersburg, and then spent 1911–1913 in penal exile in the Arkhangelsk province in northern Russia.

== Independent Estonia ==
After returning to Estonia, Teemant worked as a lawyer in Tallinn. He was a member of the Estonian Provincial Assembly between 1917 and 1919. In 1918, shortly after the Estonian declaration of independence, he was named Prosecutor-General of the newly formed Republic of Estonia. In 1919–1920 he was a member of the Estonian Constituent Assembly, and between 1923 and 1934 he was a member of the II-V Riigikogu, the Estonian parliament.

Teemant was named an honorary doctor of law at the University of Tartu in 1932. In 1939–1940, he was the Estonian trustee in the German Trustee Government, an organisation managing the property of the resettled Baltic Germans.

== Arrest and fate ==
Following the June 1940 Soviet invasion and occupation of Estonia and the other Baltic states, Teemant was arrested by the NKVD on 23 July. He is believed to have been shot in Tallinn, or to have died in Patarei Prison. According to other sources, he was handed a 10-year sentence in a prison camp on 21 October 1941, with no further information about his fate.

== Honours ==
=== National honours ===
- Estonia: Order of the Cross of the Eagle, 1st class (1930)

=== Foreign honours ===
- Latvia: Commander Grand Cross of the Order of the Three Stars (1926)

== See also ==
- List of people who disappeared

Preceded by Jüri Jaakson	State Elder of Estonia; 1925–1927	Succeeded by Jaan Tõnisson
Preceded by Konstantin Päts	State Elder of Estonia; 1932	Succeeded by Kaarel Eenpalu
