= Christian People's Party (Estonia) =

Estonian political party (1919–1931)

Christian People's Party Kristlik Rahvaerakond
- Founder: Johan Kõpp
- Founded: 1919
- Dissolved: 1932
- Split from: Estonian People's Party
- Succeeded by: National Centre Party
- Ideology: Christian democracy
- Political position: Centre-right
- Colours: Black

The Christian People's Party (Estonian: Kristlik Rahvaerakond, KRE) was a political party in Estonia between 1919 and 1931.

== History ==
The party had its roots in the campaign for the 1918 Constituent Assembly elections, which was contested by a group known as the "Independent Christians". The Christian Democratic Party (Kristlik Demokraatlik Partei, KDP) was established the following year by the Independent Christians and some defectors from the Estonian People's Party. The new party won five seats in the Constituent Assembly elections that year.

The KDP went on to win seven seats in the 1920 elections, and joined Konstantin Päts' Farmers' Assemblies-led the government on 5 January 1921, being given the Education ministry post. However, the following year it caused a split in the government by introducing a bill to provide religious education in state schools, funded by the state. Although the proposal was rejected by the Riigikogu, the party forced a referendum on the issue in early 1923, which resulted in a "yes" vote. As this was considered to be a vote of confidence on the rest of the government, the Riigikogu was subsequently dissolved and fresh elections called.

In the 1923 elections the party won eight seats, and were part of a minority government headed by its leader Friedrich Akel between March and December 1924. Prior to the 1926 elections the party was renamed as the Christian People's Party, but was reduced to five seats. It later suffered a further reduction to four seats in the 1929 elections.

In October 1931, the party merged with the Estonian People's Party to form the United Nationalists Party. The following year the Estonian Labour Party joined the merged party, which became the National Centre Party.
