= Estonian Labour Party =

Political party in interwar Estonia

Estonian Labour Party Eesti Tööerakond
- Founder: Jüri Vilms
- Founded: 1917
- Dissolved: 1932
- Merger of: ERSP, Social Travaillist Party
- Merged into: National Centre Party
- Ideology: Social liberalism Social democracy Centrism; Agrarianism; Classical radicalism From mid 1920s: Conservatism
- Political position: Centre to centre-left From mid 1920s: Centre-right
- Colours: Red

The Estonian Labour Party (Estonian: Eesti Tööerakond, ETE) was a political party in Estonia. It was formed in 1919 by a merger of the Radical Socialist Party and the Social Travaillist Party, and ceased to exist in 1932, when it merged with other centrist parties to form the National Centre Party. It was a member of government coalitions between 1919 and 1925, and again from 1927 until 1931.

== History ==
The ETE had its roots in the Estonian Radical Socialist Party and the Social Travaillist Party, both of which were founded in 1917. The two parties collaborated closely and were collectively known as the "Labourites". Both parties won seats in the Estonian Provincial Assembly elections later in the year, and together made up the second largest faction in the Assembly. In November 1917, the Labourites received 21% of the votes in the Russian Constituent Assembly elections. In late December 1917, after the partially successful Bolshevik coup d'état in Estonia, Labourites were the first to publicly demand independence for Estonia. By the 1918 Estonian Constituent Assembly election, their support had risen to 30.4%.

After Estonia declared independence on 24 February 1918, the Labourites were part of the Estonian Provisional Government, as were all the parties, that supported Estonian independence. In March 1918, Labourite leader Jüri Vilms went missing in Finland, where he was presumably executed. He was replaced by Otto Strandman, Piip, Juhan Kukk, Theodor Pool and Seljamaa.

The two parties formally merged in 1919, and won a quarter of the seats in the 1919 Constituent Assembly elections, with Strandman heading the government formed on 8 May 1919. The party went on to win the 1920 parliamentary elections with 22 of the 100 seats in the Riigikogu. It finished third in the 1923 elections, fourth in the 1926 and 1929 elections.

In January 1932, the party merged with the United Nationalists Party (an October 1931 merger of the Estonian People's Party and the Christian People's Party) to form the National Centre Party.

== Ideology ==
After its foundation, the Labour Party supported non-revolutionary social and agrarian reform. In the Constituent Assembly it was influential in composing the radical land reform and the 1920 constitution. Socialist during its early years, the party gradually moved towards the political centre. It championed the separation of church and state.

The party drew its support from artisans, civil servants, intellectuals, small landowners and the non-socialist working class.

== Heads of government ==
| Portrait | Name | Term of office | | | Cabinet | Legislature |
| Portrait | Name | Took office | Left office | Days | Cabinet | Legislature |
|---|---|---|---|---|---|---|
| | Otto August Strandman (1875–1941); 1st Prime Minister | 9 May 1919 | 18 November 1919 | 194 | Strandman I ETE–ESDTP–ER | Constituent; Assembly (1919) |
| | Ants Piip (1884–1942); 5th Prime Minister | 26 October 1920 | 20 December 1920 | 92 | Piip; ETE | I Riigikogu (1920) |
| | Ants Piip (1884–1942); 1st State Elder | 20 December 1920 | 25 January 1921 | 92 | Piip; ETE | I Riigikogu (1920) |
| | Juhan Kukk (1885–1942); 3rd State Elder | 21 November 1922 | 2 August 1923 | 255 | Kukk; ETE–PK–ER; ETE–PK–ER–ESDTP; ETE–PK–ESDTP | I Riigikogu (1920) |
| | Otto August Strandman (1875–1941); 10th State Elder (2nd term) | 9 July 1929 | 12 February 1931 | 584 | Strandman II; ETE–ARVK–PK–KRE–ER | IV Riigikogu (1929) |

== Ministers ==
Government ministers of the Estonian Labour Party
| Minister | Term | Title |
|---|---|---|
| Jüri Vilms | 24 February 1918 – 13 April 1918 | Deputy Chairman of the Council of Ministers and Minister of Court |
| Juhan Kukk | 24 February 1918 – 12 November 1918 | Minister of Finance and State Treasury |
| Juhan Kukk | 12 November 1918 – 27 November 1918 | Minister of Finance and Deputy Minister of Internal Affairs |
| Juhan Kukk | 27 November 1918 – 28 July 1920 | Minister of Finance |
| Juhan Kukk | 25 January 1921 – 27 April 1921 | Minister of Commerce and Industry |
| Juhan Kukk | 27 April 1921 – 18 November 1921 | Minister of Commerce and Industry and acting Minister of Labour |
| Juhan Kukk | 21 November 1922 – 2 August 1923 | State Elder |
| Ferdinand Peterson | 24 February 1918 – 27 November 1918 | Minister of Roads |
| Otto August Strandman | 12 November 1918 – 27 November 1918 | Minister of Foreign Affairs |
| Otto August Strandman | 27 November 1918 – 9 May 1919 | Minister of Agriculture |
| Otto August Strandman | 9 May 1919 – 18 November 1919 | Prime Minister and Minister of War |
| Otto August Strandman | 26 October 1920 – 14 January 1921 | Minister of Court and Foreign Affairs |
| Otto August Strandman | 26 March 1924 – 14 May 1924 | Minister of Foreign Affairs |
| Otto August Strandman | 14 May 1924 – 16 December 1924 | Minister of Finance |
| Otto August Strandman | 9 July 1929 – 12 February 1931 | State Elder |
| Eduard Säkk | 27 November 1918 – 9 May 1919 | Minister of Roads |
| Eduard Säkk | 18 November 1919 – 28 July 1920 | Minister of Roads |
| Theodor Pool | 9 May 1919 – 18 November 1919 | Minister of Agriculture and Nutrition |
| Theodor Pool | 18 November 1919 – 30 July 1920 | Minister of Agriculture |
| Theodor Pool | 26 October 1920 – 25 January 1921 | Minister of Agriculture |
| Ants Piip | 9 October 1919 – 18 November 1919 | Minister of Foreign Affairs |
| Ants Piip | 26 October 1920 – 20 December 1920 | Prime Minister and Minister of War |
| Ants Piip | 20 December 1920 – 14 January 1921 | State Elder and Minister of War |
| Ants Piip | 14 January 1921 – 25 January 1921 | State Elder, Minister of War and acting Minister of Foreign Affairs |
| Ants Piip | 25 January 1921 – 26 January 1921 | Minister of Foreign Affairs |
| Ants Piip | 26 January 1921 – 23 November 1921 | Minister of Foreign Affairs and acting Minister of Roads |
| Ants Piip | 23 November 1921 – 16 December 1921 | Minister of Foreign Affairs and acting Minister of Commerce, Industry, Labour and Roads |
| Ants Piip | 16 December 1921 – 20 October 1922 | Minister of Foreign Affairs |
| Ants Piip | 15 December 1925 – 23 July 1926 | Minister of Foreign Affairs |
| Lui Olesk | 9 October 1919 – 18 November 1919 | Minister of Court |
| Lui Olesk | 26 October 1920 – 25 January 1921 | Minister of Commerce, Industry and Roads |
| Karl August Baars | 26 October 1920 – 14 January 1921 | Minister of Finance |
| Karl August Baars | 14 January 1921 – 25 January 1921 | Minister of Finance and acting Minister of Court |
| Karl August Baars | 1 April 1924 – 14 May 1924 | Minister of Finance |
| Jüri Annusson | 26 October 1920 – 25 January 1921 | Minister of Education |
| Peet Johanson | 26 October 1920 – 25 January 1921 | Minister of Nutrition |
| Christjan Kaarna | 16 December 1921 – 20 October 1922 | Minister of Labour and Welfare |
| Christjan Kaarna | 21 November 1922 – 2 August 1923 | Minister of Labour and Welfare |
| Christjan Kaarna | 26 March 1924 – 23 July 1926 | Minister of Labour and Welfare |
| Aleksander Veidermann | 21 November 1922 – 19 February 1924 | Minister of Education |
| Ado Anderkopp | 21 November 1922 – 19 February 1924 | Minister of War |
| Ado Anderkopp | 12 April 1930 – 12 February 1931 | Minister of War |
| Tõnis Kalbus | 15 December 1925 – 23 July 1926 | Minister of Court |
| Tõnis Kalbus | 9 December 1927 – 4 December 1928 | Minister of Court |
| Tõnis Kalbus | 4 December 1928 – 12 April 1930 | Minister of Court and Internal Affairs |
| Alfred Julius Mõttus | 9 December 1927 – 4 December 1928 | Minister of Education |
| Mihkel Juhkam | 4 December 1928 – 9 July 1929 | Minister of War |
