= Estonian People's Party =

Estonian political party

Estonian People's Party Eesti Rahvaerakond
- Founder: Jaan Tõnisson
- Founded: March 1919
- Dissolved: October 1931
- Split from: Estonian Democratic Party; Estonian Radical Democratic Party
- Succeeded by: National Centre Party
- Ideology: Conservatism; National liberalism Ordoliberalism
- Political position: Centre-right
- Colours: Green

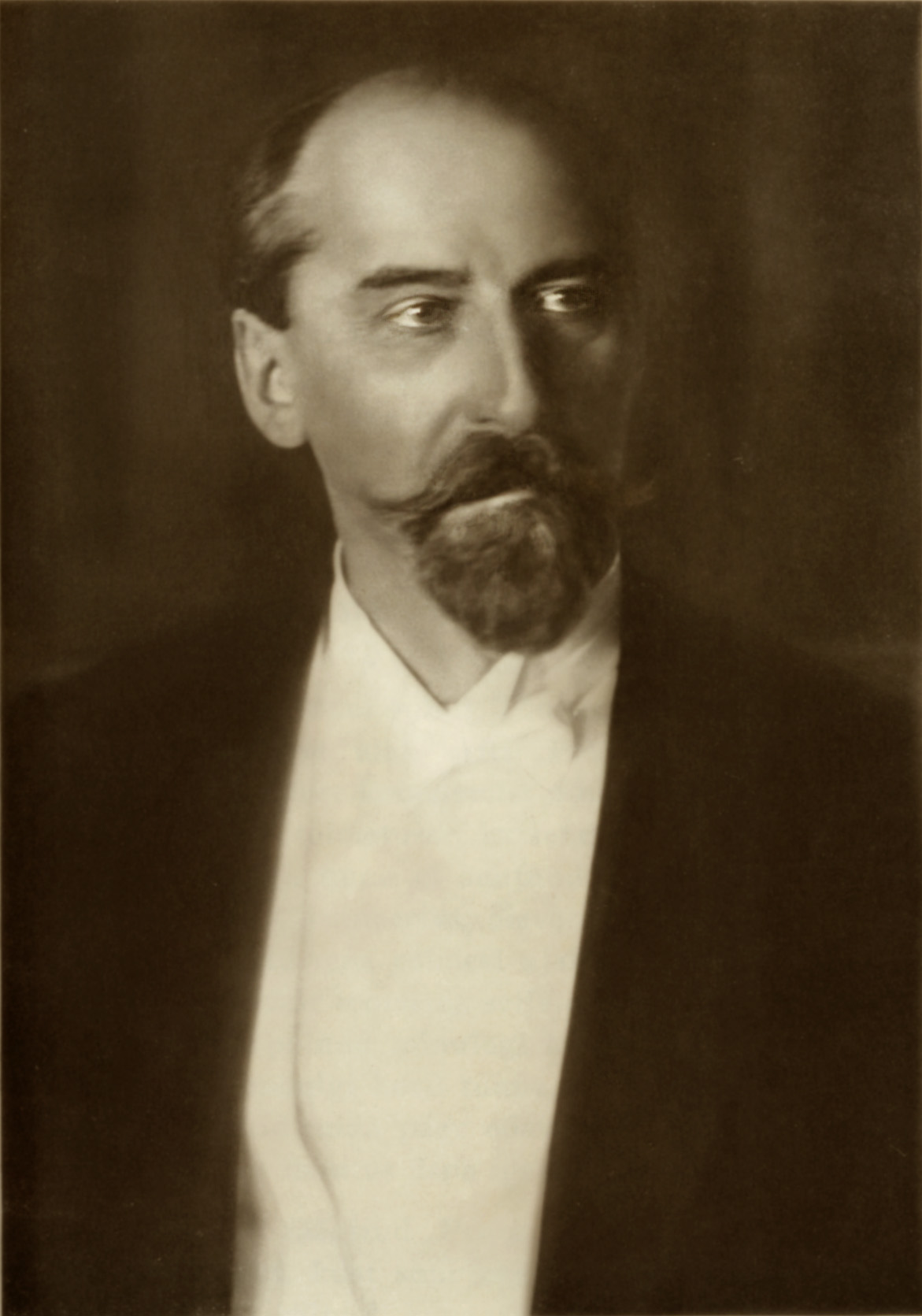
Jaan Tõnisson, 1928

The Estonian People's Party (Estonian: Eesti Rahvaerakond, ER) was a centre-right political party in Estonia.

== History ==
The party was established in March 1919 by a merger of the Estonian Democratic Party and the Estonian Radical Democratic Party. Some right-wing members of the Democratic Party opposed merging with the Radical Democrats and broke away to form the Christian Democratic Party. In the April 1919 Constituent Assembly elections the new party won 25 of the 120 seats, becoming the third-largest party in the Assembly.

However, the 1920 election saw it reduced to 10 seats in the 100-seat Riigikogu. It won eight seats in the 1923 and 1926 elections, and nine in the 1929 elections.

In October 1931, it merged with Christian People's Party to form the United Nationalist Party; the resulting party was joined by the Estonian Labour Party in January 1932, becoming the National Centre Party.
