= Members of the 1st Riigikogu =

This is a list of members of the first legislature of the Estonian Parliament (Riigikogu) following the 1920 elections (held on 27–29 November 1920). It sat between 20 December 1920 and 30 May 1923, before the next round of elections were held.

== Parties and seats ==
The 1920 general election distributed the 100 seats as follows:

Party	Seats	+/–
Estonian Labour Party (ETE)	22	–8
Farmers' Assemblies (PK)	21	+13
Estonian Social Democratic Workers' Party (ESDTP)	18	–23
Estonian Independent Socialist Workers' Party (EISTP)	11	+4
Estonian People's Party (ER)	10	–15
Christian Democratic Party (KRE)	7	+2
Central Committee of Tallinn Trade Unions (TAK)	5	New
German-Baltic Party (SBE)	4	+1
Russian National Union (VEE)	1	0
Economic Group (MR)	1	New
Total	100	–20
Source: Nohlen and Stöver

== Officials ==
Chairmen:

- Otto Strandman (4 January 1921 to 18 November 1921)
- Johann Kukk (18 November 1921 to 20 November 1922)
- Konstantin Päts (from 20 November 1922)

First Assistant Chairman:

- Karl Virma (from 4 January 1921)

Second Assistant Chairmen:

- Jaan Järve (4 January 1921 to 4 March 1921)
- August Kerem (from 4 March 1921)

Secretaries:

- Artur Tupits (4 January 1921 to 20 November 1922)
- Tõnis Kalbus (from 20 November 1922)

First Assistant Secretary

- Jaan-Johann Bergmann (from 4 January 1921)

Second Assistant Secretary

- Walter von Pezold (from 4 January 1921)

== List of members ==
Name	Start of term	End of term	Party	Other offices
Paul Abramson	25 January 1921 (replacing Otto Münther)	26 October 1921 (replaced by Johann Anderson)	EISTP	
Peeter Adamson	12 June 1923 (replacing Johannes Oriku)	End of session	ESDTP	
Johannes-August Allikso	Start of session	19 October 1921 (resigned; replaced by Eduard Kägu)	KRE	
Oskar Amberg	Start of session	End of session	SBE	
Hermann-Leopold Ammende	Start of session	4 January 1921 (replaced by Walter von Pezold)	ETE	
Ado Anderkopp	Start of session	End of session	EISTP	
Johann Anderson	26 October 1921 (replacing Paul Abramson)	11 November 1921 (replaced by Voldemar Oras)	(TAK)KTR, EISTP	
Sergei Andrejev	15 March 1922 (replacing Johannes Soans)	6 December 1922 (replaced by Alfred Maurer)	ETE	
Jüri Annusson	Start of session	End of session	ESDTP	
Christian Arro	Start of session	End of session	PK	
Emma Asson	Start of session	End of session	ESDTP	
Karl Ast	Start of session	End of session	ESDTP	
Robert Astrem	29 September 1922 (replacing Märt Raud)	End of session	ESDTP	
Karl August Baars	Start of session	End of session	ETE	Minister of Finance (26 October 1920 to 25 January 1921); Deputy Minister of Justice (14 January 1921 to 25 January 1921)
Artur Bach	13 October 1921 (replacing Juhan Jans)	18 October 1921 (replacing Peeter Treiberg)	ESDTP	
Adam Bachmann	Start of session	30 July 1921 (replaced by Jakob Westholm)	ER	
Jaan-Johann Bergmann	Start of session	End of session	KRE	
Vladimir Binsol	7 March 1922 (replacing Jakob Meeritsa)	End of session	EISTP	
Ado Birk	Start of session	End of session	ER	
Eduard Birkenberg	Start of session	End of session	PK	
Martin Bleimann	Start of session	14 December 1921 (replaced by Kusti Köidam)	EISTP	
Max Woldemar Gustav Eduard Bock	Start of session	End of session	SBE	
Aksel Brehm	Start of session	16 December 1921 (replaced by Karl Ellis)	EISTP	
Karl Eenpalu	Start of session	End of session	ER, PK	Minister of the Interior (25 January 1921 to 21 November 1922); Minister of Labour and Welfare (16 January 1921 to 27 April 1921); Minister of Welfare (27 April 1921 to 16 December 1921); Minister of Internal Affairs (21 November 1922 to 2 August 1923)
August Ehrlich	7 January 1921 (replacing Peeter Põllu)	End of session	ER	
Jaan Eigo	Start of session	End of session	PK	
Karl Ellis	16 December 1921 (replacing Aksel Brehm)	10 March 1922 (replaced by Paula Järv)	EISTP	
Villem Ernits	Start of session	End of session	ESDTP	
Karl Oskar Freiberg	Start of session	End of session	EISTP	
Vassili Grigorjev	Start of session	End of session	ETE	
Timotheus Grünthal	2 November 1921 (replacing Friido Kirsi)	25 November 1921 (replaced by Aleksander Hint)	ETE	
Oskar Gustavson	Start of session	End of session	EISTP	
Augustin Hansen	Start of session	End of session	EISTP	
Mihkel Haus	10 May 1921 (replacing Jaan Kurgemaa)	16 July 1921 (resigned; replaced by Jüri Reinthal)	(TAK)KTR	
Aleksander Hint	25 November 1921 (replacing Timotheus Grünthal)	End of session	ETE	
Jaan Hünerson	Start of session	End of session	PK	
Karl Ipsberg	12 April 1921 (replacing Paul Leis)	End of session	PK	Minister of Roads (16 December 1921 to 21 November 1922, and 21 November 1922 to 2 August 1923); Minister of Trade and Industry (16 December 1921 to 21 November 1922)
Aleksander Jaakson	29 September 1922 (replacing Johan Teng)	End of session	EISTP	
Jaak Jakobson	29 March 1922 (replacing Arnold Sommerling)	7 April 1922 (replaced by Adolf Leevald)	(TAK)KTR	
Johan Jans	Start of session	11 October 1921 (replaced by Artur Bach)	ESDTP	
Leopold Johannes Johanson	Start of session	End of session	ESDTP	
Erich Jonas	Start of session	End of session	EISTP	
Aleksander Jõeäär	Start of session	End of session	ESDP	
Paula Järv	10 March 1922 (replacing Karl Ellis)	25 April 1922 (replaced by Karl Tammik)	EISTP	
Jaan Järve	Start of session	14 March 1922 (replaced by Alfred Teppan)	ER	
Oskar Rudolf Jürgenfeldt	16 December 1921 (replacing Lui Olesk)	End of session	ETE	
Anton Tõnis Jürgenstein	Start of session	End of session	ER	
August Jürima	Start of session	End of session	PK	
Aleksander Kaar	Start of session	15 October 1921 (replaced by Friido Kirs)	ETE	
Christjan Kaarna	Start of session	End of session	ETE	
Tõnis Kalbus	Start of session	End of session	EISTP	
Jaan Kalla	10 March 1922 (replacing Hans Kruus)	15 March 1922 (replaced by Karl Stallmeister)	(ETE)	
Aksel Kallas	Start of session	3 April 1922 (died; replaced on 7 April 1922 by Madis Rookman)	KRE	
Johan Kana	Start of session	End of session	ETE	
Paul Keerdo	Start of session	End of session	EISTP	
August Kerem	Start of session	End of session	ER	
Johann Kesküll	Start of session	End of session	MR	
Mart Kiirats	Start of session	12 April 1921 (replaced by Jaan Saul)	PK	
Eduard Kirs	1 November 1922 (replacing Johannes Lehman)	End of session	ESDTP	
Friido Kirs	15 October 1921 (replacing Aleksander Kaare)	2 November 1922 (resigned; replaced by Timotheus Grünthal)	ETE	
Hermann Georg Willibald Koch	Start of session	End of session	SBE	
Karp Koemets	Start of session	End of session	ETE	
Peeter Koemets	Start of session	End of session	PK	
Johannes Koppel	7 October 1921 (replacing Georg Tamme)	End of session	PK	
Jaan Kriisa	Start of session	7 January 1921 (replaced by Johannes Semm)	ER	
Hans Kruus	Start of session	10 March 1922 (replaced by Jaan Kalla)	EISTP	
Johann Kukk	Start of session	End of session	ETE	Chairman of the Board of the Ministry of Trade, Industry and Roads (26 October 1920 to 25 January 1921); Minister of Commerce and Industry (25 January 1921 to 18 November 1922); Minister of Industry (27 April 1921 to 16 December 1921).
Jaan Kurgemaa	5 April 1921 (replacing Jaan Reinberg)	10 May 1921 (resigned; replaced by Mihkel Haus)	(TAK)KTR	
Eduard Kägu	20 October 1921 (replacing Johannes-August Allikso)	6 December 1922 (replaced by Aleksander Leopold Raudkepp)	(TAK)KTR	
Kustas Köidam	15 December 1921 (replacing Martin Bleimann)	25 April 1922 (replaced by August Putk)	EISTP	
Johan Laidoner	Start of session	End of session	PK	
Jann Lattik	Start of session	End of session	KRE	
Jaan Leeto	15 November 1921 (replacing Villem Tiideman)	14 March 1922 (resigned; replaced by Arnold Sommerling)	(TAK)KTR	
Adolf Leevald	7 April 1922 (replacing Jaak Jakobson)	29 September 1922 (replaced by Jaan Tomp)	(TAK)KTR	
Johannes Lehman	17 October 1922 (replacing Peeter Treiberg)	1 November 1922 (resigned; replaced by Friido Kirs)	ESDTP	
Paul Leis	Start of session	12 April 1921 (replaced by Karl Ipsberg)	PK	
Artur Liiberg	Start of session	6 December 1921 (replaced by Jaan Tiks)	EISTP	
Oskar Karl Johann Liigand	7 January 1921 (replacing Jaan Mägi)	End of session	ER	
Eduard Liivak	Start of session	End of session	PK	
Karl Liivak	18 October 1922 (replacing Julius Seljamaa)	End of session	ETE	
Andres Lilienblatt	18 January 1921 (replacing Ado Rõõmussaare)	End of session	PK	
Voldemar Linnamägi	Start of session	End of session	KRE	
Juhan Luiga	Start of session	End of session	ETE	
Villem Maaker	Start of session	End of session	ETE	
August Maramaa	Start of session	15 September 1922 (replaced by Aleksander Tulp)	ESDTP	
Ernst Martinson	Start of session	End of session	ESDTP	
Hans Martna	Start of session	23 September 1922 (replaced by Märt Raud)	ESDTP	
Mihkel Martna	Start of session	End of session	ESDTP	
Alfred Maurer	6 December 1922 (replacing Sergei Andrejev)	End of session	PK	
Jakob Meerits	Start of session	7 March 1923 (replaced by Vladimir Binsol)	EISTP	
Karl Mikita	8 January 1923 (replacing Paul Öpik)	End of session	ETE	
Hans Mitt	Start of session	7 January 1921 (replaced by Ado Rõõmussaar)	PK	
Jaan Mägi	Start of session	7 January 1921 (replaced by Oskar Liigand)	ER	
Johannes Märtson	11 February 1921 (replacing Hugo Rahamägi)	End of session	KRE	
Otto Münther	Start of session	25 January 1921 (replaced by Paul Abramson)	EISTP	
Mihkel Neps	Start of session	End of session	(TAK)KTR	
Aleksander Oinas	Start of session	End of session	ESDTP	
Lui Olesk	Start of session	16 December 1921 (replaced by Oskar Jürgenfeldt)	ESDTP	
Voldemar Oras	11 November 1921 (Johann Anderson)	End of session	ETE	
Johannes Orik	2 March 1923 (replacing Aleksander Tulp)	12 March 1923 (resigned; replaced by Peeter Adamson)	EISTP	
Alma Ostra-Oinas	Start of session	End of session	ESDTP	
Rudolf Paabo	24 November 1922 (replacing Villem Aleksander Reinok)	29 November 1922 (replaced by Paul Öpik)	ETE	
Anton Palvadre	Start of session	End of session	ESDTP	
Jüri Parik	Start of session	End of session	PK	
Tõnis Pedak	21 October 1921 (replacing Peeter Puusepa)	End of session	PK	
Walter von Pezold	4 January 1921 (replacing Hermann-Leopold Ammende)	End of session	SBE	
Hans Piip	Start of session	End of session	ETE	State Chancellor (20 December 1921 to 25 January 1921); Minister of Foreign Affairs (25 January 1921 to 21 November 1922); Minister of Roads (26 January 1921 to 16 December 1921); Minister of Commerce, Industry and Labour (23 November 1921 to 16 December 1921)
Karl Piirisild	4 December 1922 (replacing Johannes Semm)	End of session	ER	
Jaan Piiskar	Start of session	End of session	EISTP	
Theodor Pool	Start of session	End of session	ETE	
Aleksander Prass	15 November 1921 (replacing Jüri Reinthal)	End of session	(TAK)KTR	
August Putk	25 April 1922 (replacing Kusti Koidam)	22 June 1922 (resigned; replaced by August Sprenk)	EISTP	
Peeter Puusepp	Start of session	21 October 1921 (replaced by Tõnis Pedak)		
Peeter Siegfried Põld	Start of session	7 January 1921 (replaced by August Ehrlich)	ER	
Otto-Rudolf Pärlin	Start of session	End of session	PK	
Aleksander Pärn	3 January 1923 (replacing Karl Stallmeister)	End of session	EISTP	
Konstantin Päts	Start of session	End of session	PK	State Elder of Estonia (25 January 1921 to 21 November 1922)
Hans Pöhl	Start of session	End of session	KRE	
Mait Püümann	Start of session	End of session	ESDTP	
Hugo Bernhard Rahamägi	Start of session	11 February 1921 (replaced by Johannes Märtson)	KRE	
Märt Raud	26 September 1922 (replacing Hans Martna)	29 September 1922 (replaced by Robert Astrem)	ESDTP	
Aleksander Leopold Raudkepp	6 December 1922 (replacing Eduard Kägus)	End of session	KRE	
Johannes Reesen	29 September 1922 (replacing Johannes Vanja)	End of session	(TAK)KTR	
August Rei	Start of session	End of session	ESDTP	
Jaan Reinberg	Start of session	5 April 1921 (replaced by Jaan Kurgemaa)	(TAK)KTR	
Villem Aleksander Reinok	28 October 1922 (replacing Anton Uesson)	24 November 1922 (replaced by Rudolf Paab)	ETE	
Jüri Reinthal	16 July 1921 (replacing Mihkel Haus)	15 November 1921 (resigned; replaced by Alexander Prass)	(TAK)KTR	
Jüri Rooberg	Start of session	7 January 1921 (replaced by Johannes Vanja)	(TAK)KTR	
Madis Rookman	7 April 1922 (replacing Aksel Kallas)	End of session	KRE	
Ado Rõõmussaar	7 January 1921 (replacing Hans Mitt)	18 January 1921 (replaced by Andres Lilienblatt)	PK	
Aleksander Saar	Start of session	End of session	PK	
Jaan Santa	Start of session	19 January 1921 (replaced by Villem Tiideman)	(TAK)KTR	
Jaan Saul	12 April 1921 (replacing Mart Kiiratsi)	End of session	PK	
Arnold Paul Schulbach	Start of session	End of session	ETE	
Julius Friedrich Seljamaa	Start of session	18 October 1922 (replaced by Karl Liibak)	ETE	
Johannes Semm	7 January 1921 (replacing Jaan Kriisa)	4 December 1922 (replaced by Karl Piirsild)	ETE	
Johannes Soans	Start of session	15 March 1922 (replaced by Sergei Andrejev)	(TAK)KTR	
Arnold Sommerling	15 March 1922 (replacing Jaan Leeto)	28 March 1922 (replaced by Jaak Jakobson)	(TAK)KTR	
Jaan Soots	Start of session	End of session	PK	Minister of War (25 January 1921 to 21 November 1922; and 22 November 1922 to 2 February 1923)
Aleksei Sorokin	Start of session	End of session	VRL	
August Sprenk	22 June 1922 (replacing August Putk)	End of session	EISTP	
Georg Rudolf Stackelberg	Start of session	10 January 1923 (replaced by Berend Wetter-Rosenthal)	SBE	
Karl Stallmeister	15 March 1922 (replacing Jaan Kalla)	3 January 1923 (replaced by Aleksander Pärn)	EISTP	
Eduard Steinmann	Start of session	End of session	PK	
Otto August Strandman	Start of session	End of session	ETE	
Fritz Suit	Start of session	End of session	ETE	
Johannes-Friedrich Zimmermann	Start of session	End of session	ETE	
Georg Tamm	Start of session	7 October 1921 (replaced by Johannes Koppel)	PK	
Karl Tammik	25 April 1922 (replacing Paul Järv)	5 May 1922 (replaced by Johan Teng)	EISTP	
Johan Teng	5 May 1922 (replacing Karl Tammiku)	29 September 1922 (replaced by Aleksander Jaakson)	TAK(KTR), EISTP	
Alfred Teppan	14 March 1922 (replacing Jaan Järve)	End of session	ER	
Villem Tiideman	19 October 1921 (replacing Jean Santa)	15 November 1921 (replacled by Jaan Leeto)	TAK(KTR)	
Jaan Tiks	6 December 1921 (replacing Artur Liibergi)	End of session	EISTP	
Jaan Tomp	29 September 1922 (replacing Adolf Leevaldi)	End of session	TAK(KTR)	
Peeter Treiberg	18 October 1921 (replacing Artur Bachi)	17 October 1922 (replaced by Johannes Lehman)	ESDTP	
Aleksander Tulp	15 September 1922 (replaced by August Maramaa)	2 March 1923 (replaced by Johannes Orik)	ESDTP	
Artur Tupits	Start of session	End of session	PK	
Jaan Tõnisson	Start of session	End of session	ER	
Anton Uesson	Start of session	28 October 1922 (resigned; replaced by Villem Reinok)	ETE	
Jüri Uluots	Start of session	25 September 1922 (replaced by Johannes Vilmann)	PK	
Jaan Vain	Start of session	End of session	ESDTP	
Johannes Vanja	7 January 1921 (replacing Jüri Roober)	29 September 1922 (replaced by Johannes Reesen)	(TAK)KTR	
Aleksander Veiler	Start of session	End of session	ETE	
Jakob Westholm	30 July 1921 (replacing Adam Bachman)	End of session	ER	
Berend Wetter-Rosenthal	10 January 1923 (replacing Georg Rudolf Stackelberg)	End of session	SBE	
Johannes Vilmann (alias Villman, Villmann, Vilman)	25 September 1922 (replacing Jüri Uluots)	End of session	PK	
Karl Johannes Virma	Start of session	End of session	ESDTP	
Paul Öpik	29 November 1922 (replacing Rudolf Paab)	25 January 1923 (replaced by Karl Mikita)	ETE	

== Further information ==
- "I Riigikogu koosseis [Composition of the first Riigikogu]", Riigikogu (in Estonian).
