= Villem Ernits =

Estonian linguist and politician (1891–1982)

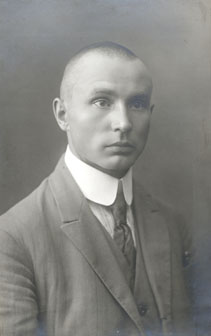
- Born: July 16, 1891; Nõva, Estonia
- Died: May 10, 1982 (aged 90); Tartu, Estonia
- Resting place: Raadi cemetery

Villem Ernits (16 July 1891 – 10 May 1982) was an Estonian linguist, philologist, temperance activist and politician.

== Biography ==
Ernits was born in Nõva in Pala Parish (now Peipsiääre Parish), Kreis Dorpat.

While studying in the University of Tartu in 1911 Estonian Students' Society and finished in 1918 under indologist Dmitri Kudryavski (Russian: Дмитрий Николаевич Кудрявский). He was an Estonian and Finnish lecteur in the University of Warsaw in 1931–33 and 1934–39. Throughout his life he wrote for various newspapers like the "Estonian tribe" (Estonian: Eesti Hõim). From 1927 to 1930 he was the secretary for the Fenno-Ugria Foundation. In addition he was one of the founding members of the Estonia Academic Oriental Society (Estonian: Eesti Akadeemiline Orientaalselts).

He was a member of Estonian Constituent Assembly as a member of the Estonian Socialist Revolutionary Party and the 1st Riigikogu. In 1919 he joined and was later the chairman of the Estonian Temperance League and the Baltic representative in the World Prohibition Federation from 1923 to 1929.

He passed away in Tartu in 1982 and was laid to rest at Raadi cemetery.

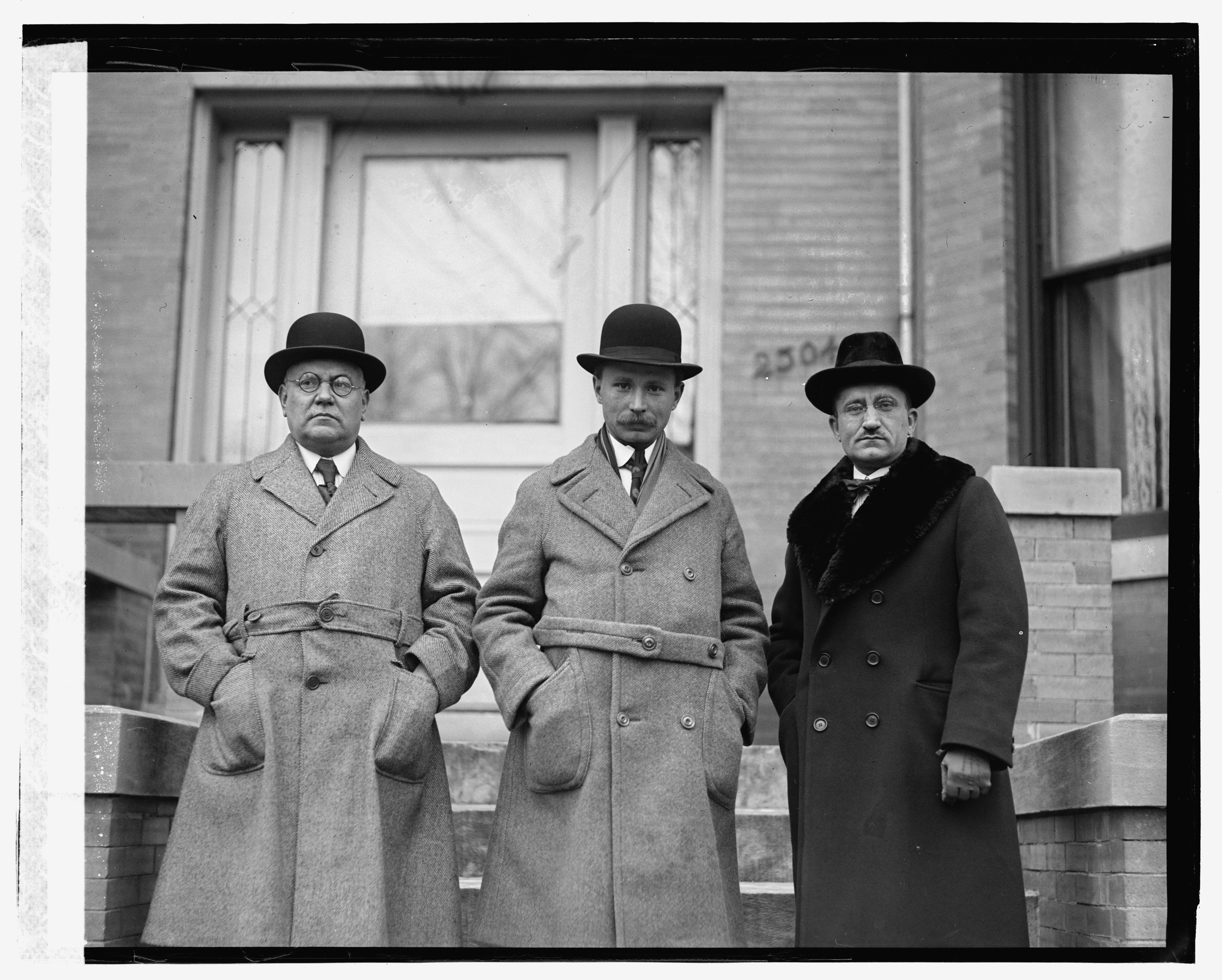
Temperance activists Gustav Kempels, Villem Eruite and Charles Louis Seya in the United States, 1923
