= Martin Bleimann =

Estonian politician (1886–1938)

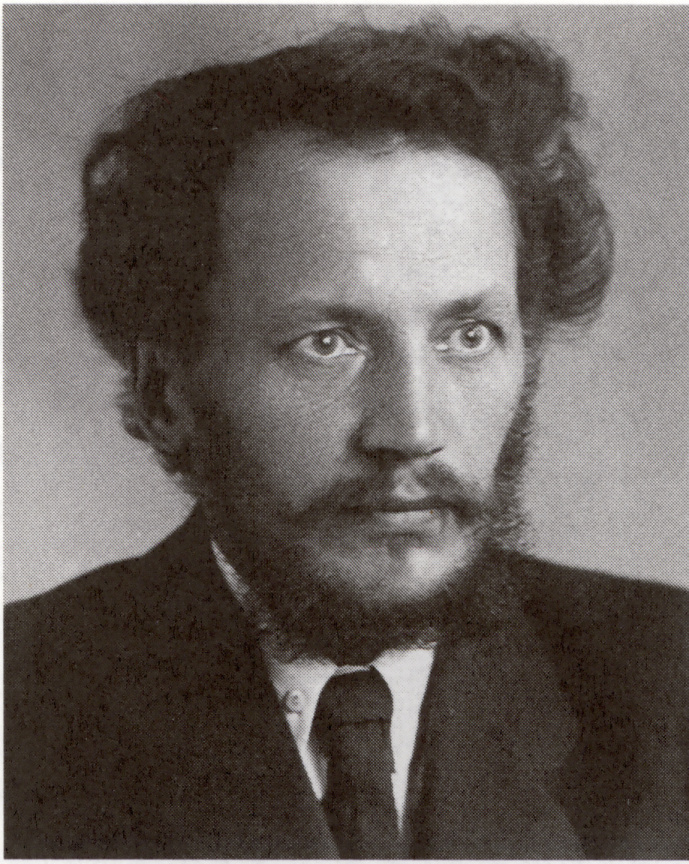
- Born: 4 April 1886; Paatsalu Parish, Kreis Wiek
- Died: 1938 (aged 51–52); Soviet Union
- Other name: Martin Baltin
- Occupation: Politician

Martin Bleimann (also Martin Baltin; 4 April 1886 in Paatsalu Parish (now Lääneranna Parish), Kreis Wiek – 1938, Soviet Union) was an Estonian politician. He was a member of the I Riigikogu, representing the Estonian Independent Socialist Workers' Party. On 14 December 1921, he resigned and was succeeded by Kustas Köidam.

== Early years ==
Bleimann was a teacher of the 6th-grade primary school in St. Petersburg's St. John's parish. He moved to Tallinn in 1917 and became a member of the Socialist Revolutionary Party. From February 24, 1918, he was a member of the Tallinn City Council.

On November 25, 1918, he was elected a Tallinn city councilor. On December 20 of the same year, he was arrested. In March 1919, Bleimann was released from prison on the condition that he renounce politics.

Bleimann almost immediately violated that restriction. In April, he tried to hijack the destroyer Lennuk to take it to Kronstadt, claiming that he needed a minesweeper to go to England for provisions. After this incident, he acquired the nickname the Admiral.

From September 5, 1919 to June 1920, he was held in jail awaiting trial. From November 1920, he hid until he was elected a member of the I Riigikogu. In February 1921, Bleimann was sentenced to six years in prison, but the Riigikogu did not revoke his parliamentary immunity.

As a member of the Riigikogu, he was the general secretary of the legal left-wing party, the Estonian Independent Socialist Workers' Party, while also acting as a spy for Soviet Russia. On June 5, 1921, Bleimann went to the 3rd Congress of the Comintern and did not return to Estonia. On December 6, 1921, the Riigikogu authorized his arrest, and on December 14, Bleimann renounced his powers as a member of the Riigikogu.

In the Soviet Union, Bleimann was distrusted, interrogated, and put under surveillance. He was not accepted into the Russian Communist (Bolshevik) Party, and in April 1922, he was expelled from the Estonian Independent Socialist Workers' Party. He became a professor at the Communist University of Western Minorities in Leningrad, where he communicated with the oppositional Estonian communists. He also took Baltin as his new surname.

In 1925, he was sentenced to three years in prison for engaging in pederasty with young workers. He was also a lifelong member of the Estonian Literary Society while living in the Soviet Union.

In 1938 he was executed.
