= August Putk =

Estonian politician

August Putk (4 February 1890 in Lihula Parish (now Lääneranna Parish), Wiek County – 12 December 1975 Estonia) was an Estonian politician. He was a member of I Riigikogu, representing the Estonian Independent Socialist Workers' Party. He became a Riigikogu member on 25 April 1922, replacing Kustas Köidam. On 22 June of that year, he resigned and was succeeded by August Sprenk.
