= Kustas Köidam =

Estonian politician (1879–1963)

Kustas Köidam (13 April 1879 in Lihula Parish (now Lääneranna Parish), Kreis Wiek – 1963) was an Estonian politician. He was a member of I Riigikogu, representing the Estonian Independent Socialist Workers' Party, from 15 December 1920 until his resignation on 25 April 1922. He succeeded Martin Bleimann and was replaced by August Putk.
