= Kruus =

Family name

Kruus is an Estonian and Finnish surname that may refer to:

- Hans Kruus (1891–1976), Estonian historian, academic, and politician
- Heino Kruus (1926–2012), Estonian basketball player
- Jaan Kruus (1884–1942), Estonian military general
- Tahvo Kruus (1862–1918), Finnish politician
