= Koemets =

Koemets is a surname. Notable people with the surname include:

- Kael Koemets (1878–1948), Estonian politician
- Peeter Koemets (1868–1950), Estonian clergyman and politician
