= Aksel Brehm =

Estonian politician

Aksel Brehm (also Aksel Preem; 1889 – ?) was an Estonian politician, born in Rapla. He was a member of I Riigikogu, representing the Estonian Independent Socialist Workers' Party. He was a member of the assembly since 15 December 1921. He replaced Aleksander Prass. On 16 December 1921, he resigned his position and he was replaced by Karl Ellis.
