= Leis (surname) =

Family name

Origin
- Language: Estonian
- Region of origin: Estonia

Leis is an Estonian surname. As of 1 January 2023, 159 men and 178 women in Estonia bear the surname Leis. Leis is ranked as the 426th most common surname for men in Estonia, and 405th for women. The surname Leis is the most commonly found in Põlva County, where 9.02 per 10,000 inhabitants bear the name.

People bearing the surname Leis include:

- Heikki Leis (born 1945), artist
- Kuldar Leis (born 1968), entrepreneur and politician
- Lauri Leis (born 1978), triple jumper
- Malle Leis (1940–2017), painter and graphic artist
- Paul Leis (1874–1947), politician
