= Aksel Kallas =

Estonian clergyman and politician

Aksel Kallas (16 June 1890 in Rõuge, Kreis Werro – 3 April 1922 in Berlin) was an Estonian clergyman and politician, son of Rudolf Kallas. He served as a pastor in Paistu, Jõhvi, and Rõuge. During the Estonian War of Independence, he was a military chaplain on the Narva front and in Võru. He was a member of the I Riigikogu, representing the Christian People's Party. After his death in 1922, he was succeeded by Madis Rookman.
