= August Sprenk =

Estonian politician (1885–1942)

August Sprenk (also August Saluste; 1 October 1885 in Mõniste Parish (now Rõuge Parish), Kreis Werro – 16 February 1942 in Gorki Oblast, Russian SFSR) was an Estonian politician. He was a member of I Riigikogu, representing the Estonian Independent Socialist Workers' Party, and of the III Riigikogu, representing the Estonian Workers' Party. He became a member of the Riigikogu on 22 June 1922 after replacing August Putk.

He died in the Soviet Gulag.
