= Soans =

Soans is a surname. Notable people with the surname include:

- Anton Lembit Soans (1885–1966), Estonian architect and urban planner
- Johannes Soans (1867–1941), Estonian politician
- Robin Soans (born 1946), British actor and playwright
