= Jaan Kalla =

Estonian politician

Jaan Kalla (also Jaan Kala; 9 May 1889, in Ahja Parish (now Põlva Parish), Kreis Dorpat – ?) was an Estonian politician. He was briefly a member of the I Riigikogu, representing the Estonian Independent Socialist Workers' Party, from 10 to 15 March 1922. He replaced Hans Kruus and, after resigning, was succeeded by Karl Stallmeister.
