= Acrodirotes =

Acrodirotes Temporal range: Dresbachian

Scientific classification
- Kingdom: Animalia
- Phylum: Arthropoda
- Clade: †Artiopoda
- Class: †Trilobita
- Order: †Ptychopariida
- Family: †Acrocephalitidae
- Genus: †Acrodirotes; Öpik, 1967

Genus of arthropods (fossil)

Acrodirotes is an extinct genus from a well-known class of fossil marine arthropods, the trilobites. It lived from 501 to 490 million years ago during the Dresbachian faunal stage of the late Cambrian Period.
