= Aleksander Pärn =

Estonian politician

Aleksander Pärn (1891–?) was an Estonian politician. He was a member of the I Riigikogu, representing the Estonian Independent Socialist Workers' Party, and of the III Riigikogu, representing the Estonian Socialist Workers' Party. He became a member of the Riigikogu on 3 January 1923 when he replaced Karl Stallmeister.
