= Tammik =

Tammik is an Estonian surname. Notable people with the surname include:

- Karl Tammik (?–?), Estonian politician
- Lisette Tammik (born 1998), Estonian footballer
- Tanel Tammik (born 2002), Estonian footballer
