= Järve =

Järve is of Estonian origin (meaning lake), and may refer to:

== Places in Estonia ==
- Järve, Tallinn, a subdistrict of Tallinn
- Järve, Kohtla-Järve, a subdistrict of Kohtla-Järve
- Järve, Toila Parish, a village
- Järve, Pärnu County, a village
- Järve, Saare County, a village

== Other uses ==
- Järve (surname), Estonian-language surname
- Järve Centre, a shopping centre in Tallinn, Estonia
- Järve railway station, Tallinn

== See also ==
- Järv (disambiguation)
- Järveküla (disambiguation)
