= Artur Bach =

Estonian politician

Artur Bach (30 January 1883 – 24 April 1924 Tartu) was an Estonian educator and politician. He was a member of I Riigikogu, representing the Estonian Social Democratic Workers' Party. He became a member of the assembly on 13 October 1921. He replaced Juhan Jans. On 18 October 1921, he resigned his position and he was replaced by Peeter Treiberg.
