= Vladimir Binsol =

Estonian politician

Vladimir Binsol (Russian: Владимірь Бинзоль; 14 January 1874 – ?) was an Estonian politician born in Lõhavere Parish, Kreis Fellin, Russian Empire (now Põhja-Sakala Parish, Estonia).

He was a member of I Riigikogu, representing the Estonian Independent Socialist Workers' Party. He was a member of the assembly since 7 March 1922. He replaced Jakob Meerits.
