= Vilmann =

Vilmann is a surname. Notable people with the surname include:

- Johannes Vilmann, Estonian politician
- Marie Vilmann (born 1993), Danish racing cyclist
