= DSU =

DSU may refer to:

== Organisations ==
- Danmarks Socialdemokratiske Ungdom (Social Democratic Youth of Denmark)
- Directorate of special units, the police tactical unit of the Belgian Federal Police
- German Social Union (East Germany) (Deutsche Soziale Union), from 1990
- Dansk Skytte Union, a Danish association for sport shooting
- Demobilised Soldiers' Union, a political party in Estonia
- Direct Source Unit, a sub-division of UK police forces dedicated to handling covert assets.

=== Education ===
- Dagestan State University, a public university in Makhachkala, Republic of Dagestan
- Dakota State University, a public university in Madison, South Dakota
- Dayananda Sagar University, a state private research university in Bengaluru, Karnataka
- Delaware State University, a public historically black university in Dover, Delaware
- Delta State University, a public university in Cleveland, Mississippi
- DeSales University, a private Catholic university in Center Valley, Pennsylvania
- DHA Suffa University, a private university run by the Pakistan Army
- Dickinson State University, a public university in Dickinson, North Dakota
- Distance State University, public university in the Republic of Costa Rica
- Dixie State University, now renamed Utah Tech University, a public university in St. George, Utah
- Dong Seoul University, a private technical college in Seongnam, South Korea

==== Student Union ====
- Dalhousie Student Union, representative of students at Dalhousie University
- Durham Students' Union, the students' union of Durham University
- Dutch Student Union, a national students' union of the Netherlands

== Technology ==
- Data service unit, a WAN equivalent of a network interface card
- Decorate-sort-undecorate, a computer science programming idiom
- Disjoint-set data structure, a data structure used to track disjoint sets
- Distress signal unit, used by firefighters
- Dynamic software updating, upgrading programs while they are running

== Other uses ==
- DSU (album), by Alex G (2014)
- Dispute Settlement Understanding, in the World Trade Organization
