= Prass =

Prass is a surname. Notable people with the surname include:

- Aleksander Prass (1891–1932), Estonian politician
- Alexander Prass (born 2001), Austrian footballer
- Brigitte Prass (born 1963), Romanian swimmer
- Fernando Prass (born 1978), Brazilian footballer
- Natalie Prass (born 1986), American singer-songwriter
