= Eduard Kirs =

Estonian politician (1887–1963)

Eduard Kirs (22 November 1887 – 17 April 1963) was an Estonian music teacher, trade unionist and politician. He was a member of the I Riigikogu, representing the Estonian Social Democratic Workers' Party. He was a member of the Riigikogu since 1 November 1922. He replaced Johannes Lehman.

Kirs was born in Tartu and studied piano and organ at the R. Griving School of Music. He played the organ and violin in churches and community centres. At the beginning of Estonia's independence, he began to organize trade unions, was the secretary of the Tartu Central Council of Trade Unions. He Worked as a singing and music teacher in several Tartu schools for more than ten years and helped organize the Tartu County Song Festival and conducted general choirs of school youth song festivals, and also acted as a choir and orchestra conductor. He was a member of the supervisory board of the Estonian Singers' Union in 1926.

Kirs was a member of Tartu City Council since 1921, and a chairman of the city audit committee. He Became an alternate member of the 1st Riigikogu, representing the Estonian Social Democratic Workers' Party in 1920. He later worked as an official in the city government, chairman of the Tartu City Service Association and temporary leader of the choir of the Tartu Workers' Music Association in 1940. He died in Tartu in 1963 and was buried in the city's Pauluse Cemetery.
