= Karl Stallmeister =

Estonian politician

Karl Stallmeister (1884–?) was an Estonian politician. He was a member of I Riigikogu, representing the Estonian Independent Socialist Workers' Party, from 15 March 1922 to 3 January 1923. He replaced Jaan Kalla. When Stallmeister later resigned, he was replaced by Aleksander Pärn.
