= Karl Ellis =

Estonian politician

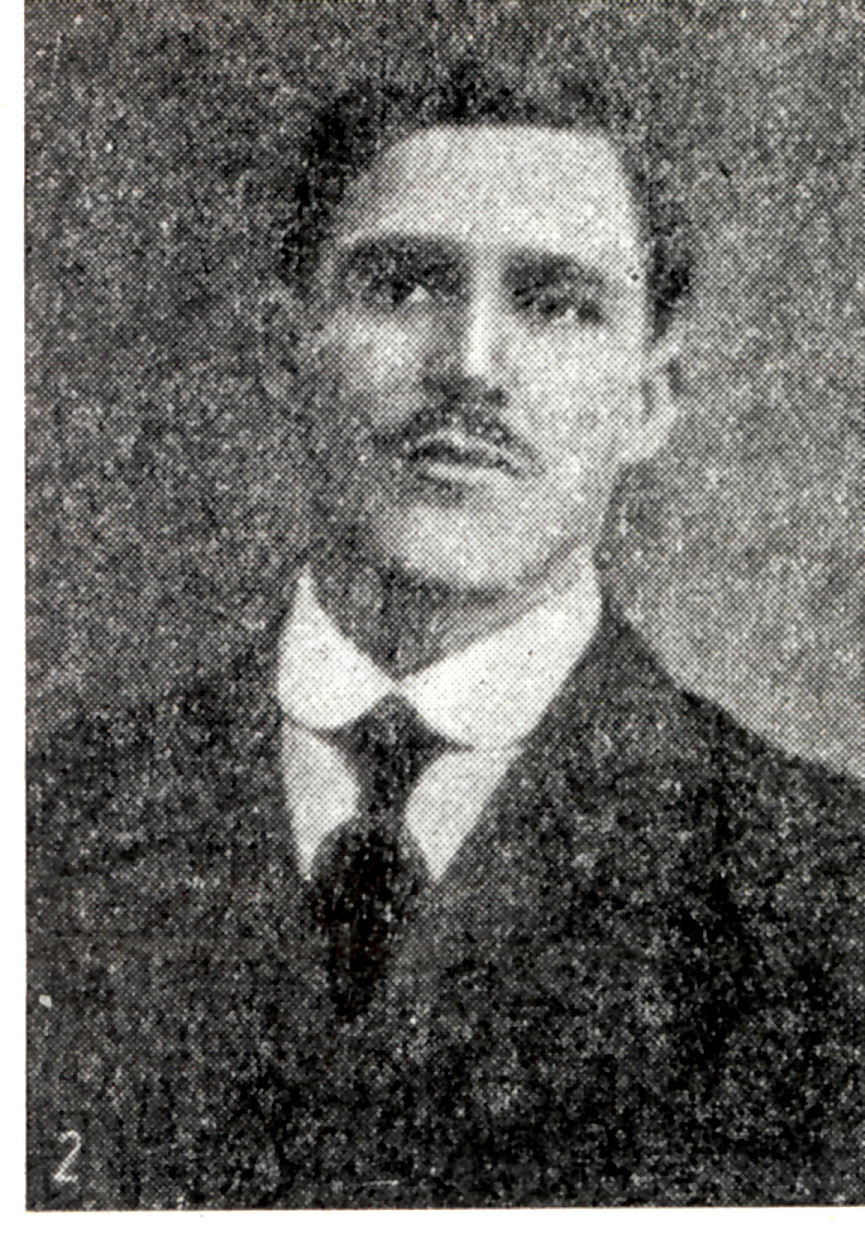
Karl Ellis

Karl Ellis (1888 – 1 December 1924 Tallinn) was an Estonian politician. He was a member of I Riigikogu, representing the Estonian Independent Socialist Workers' Party. He was a member of the assembly since 16 December 1921. He replaced Aksel Brehm. On 10 March 1922, he resigned his position and he was replaced by Paula Järv.
