= Järv =

Järv may refer to:

- Harry Järv (1921–2009), Finland Swedish librarian, author and translator
- Jaak Järv (born 1948), Estonian chemist and professor
- Paula Järv (1898–?), Estonian politician
- Risto Järv (born 1971), Estonian folklorist

== See also ==
- Järve (disambiguation)
