= Alfred Teppan =

Estonian dramatist and politician

Alfred Teppan (17 December 1890 Kuremaa Parish, Tartu County – 29 November 1975 Kohtla-Järve) was an Estonian dramatist and politician. He was a member of I Riigikogu. He was a member of the Riigikogu since 14 March 1922. He replaced Jaan Järve.
