= Aleksander Hint =

Estonian politician

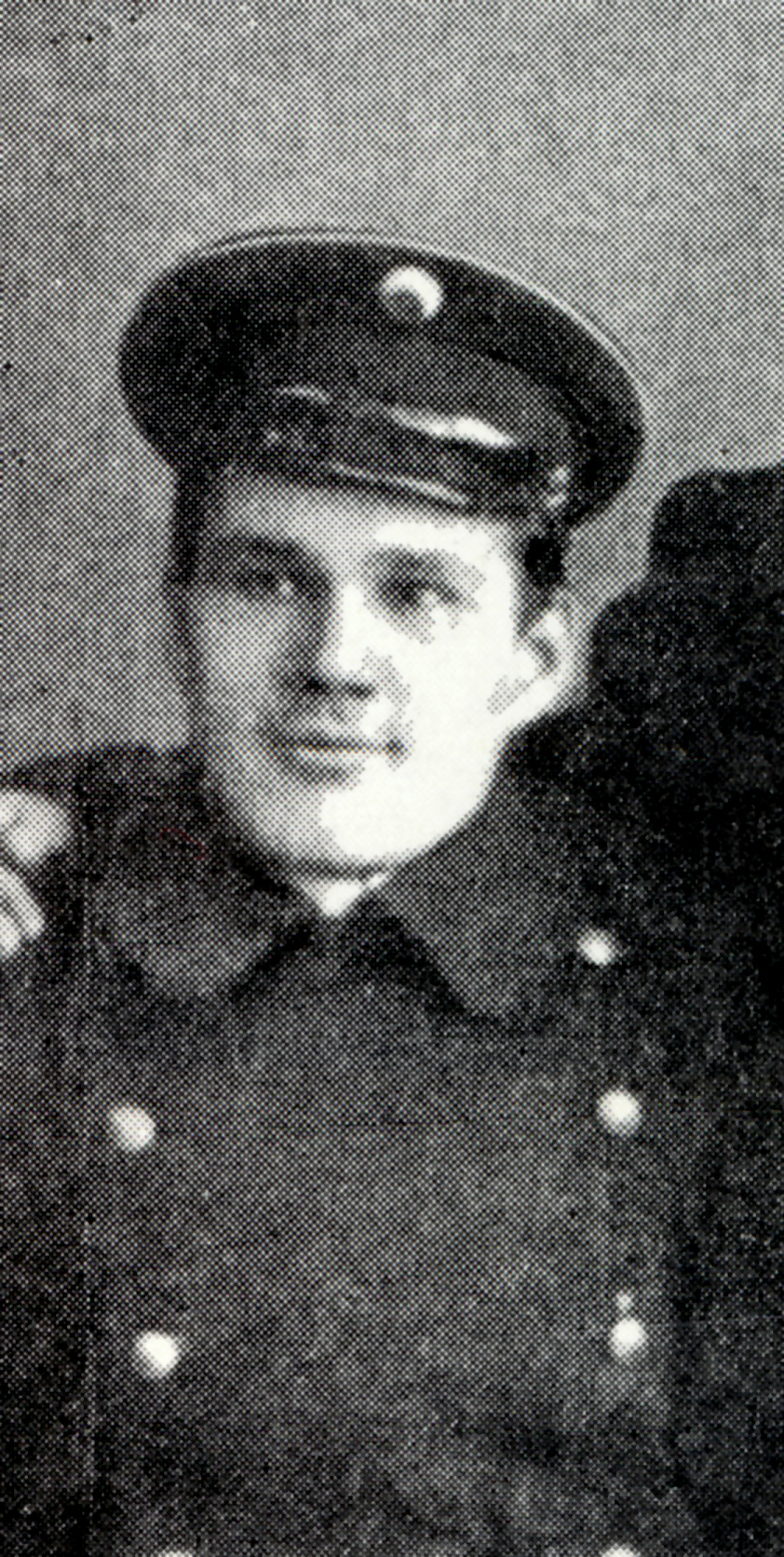
Aleksander Hint

Aleksander Hint (30 November 1884 Lümanda Parish (now Saaremaa Parish), Kreis Ösel – 30 October 1943 Aral Sea) was an Estonian politician. He was a member of I Riigikogu, representing the Estonian Labour Party. He was a member of the assembly since 25 November 1921. He replaced Timotheus Grünthal.
