= Arnold Sommerling =

Estonian communist politician

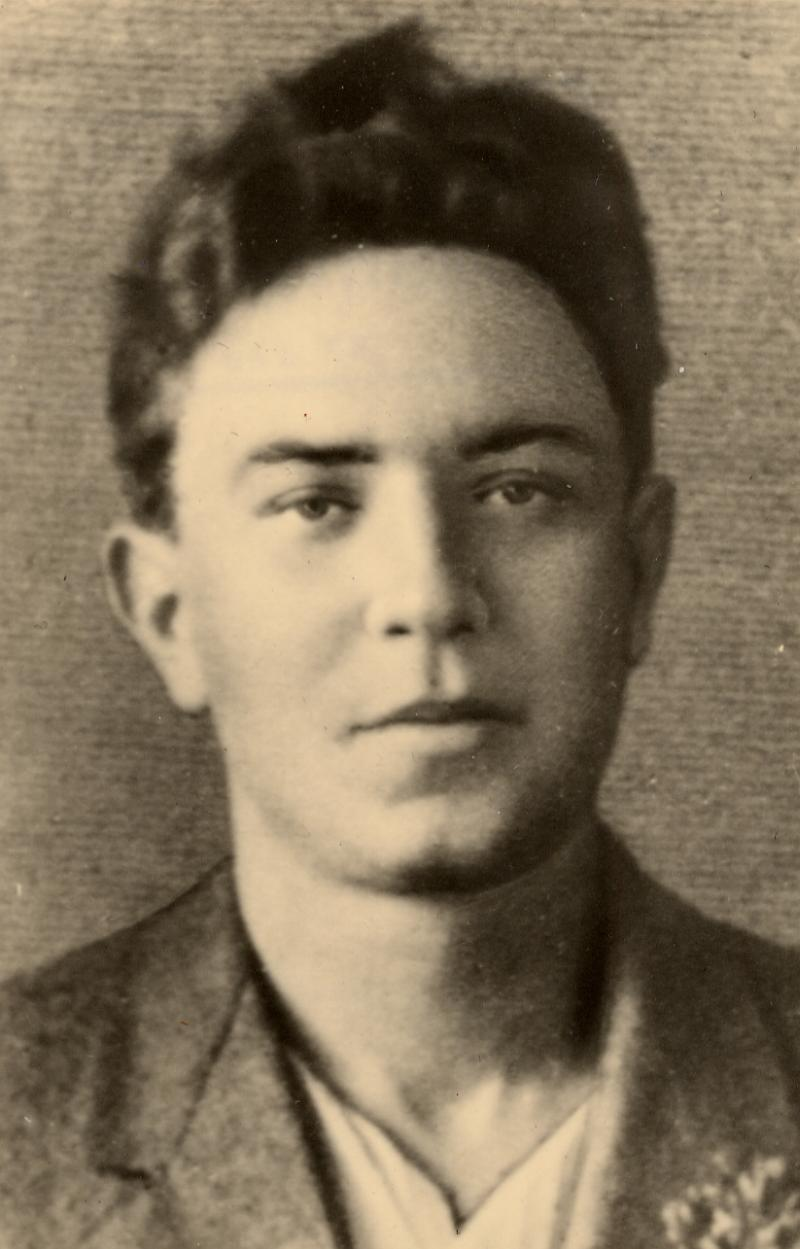
Arnold Sommerling

Arnold Sommerling (23 July 1898 Tallinn – 5 December 1924 Nehatu Parish, Harju County) was an Estonian Communist politician. He was a member of I Riigikogu, representing the Central Committee of Tallinn Trade Unions. He was a member of the Riigikogu since 15 March 1922. He replaced Jaan Leeto. On 28 March 1922, he resigned his position, and he was replaced by Jaak Jakobson. In May 1922, he was arrested on sedition charges, for which he was given a prison sentence, but shortly afterwards he was extradited to the Soviet Union as part of an exchange of prisoners. He came back to Estonia illegally in 1924, and participated in the preparations of the 1924 Estonian coup d'état attempt. After the failure of the coup attempt, Sommerling was shot by Estonian police officers on 5 December 1924, while resisting arrest.
