= Priit Suit =

Estonian politician (1881–1942)

Priit Suit (also Fritz Suit; 15 March 1881 Tartu – 20 April 1942 Sevurallag, Sverdlovsk Oblast, Russia) was an Estonian politician. He was a member of I Riigikogu.
