= Otto Münther =

Estonian writer, journalist and politician

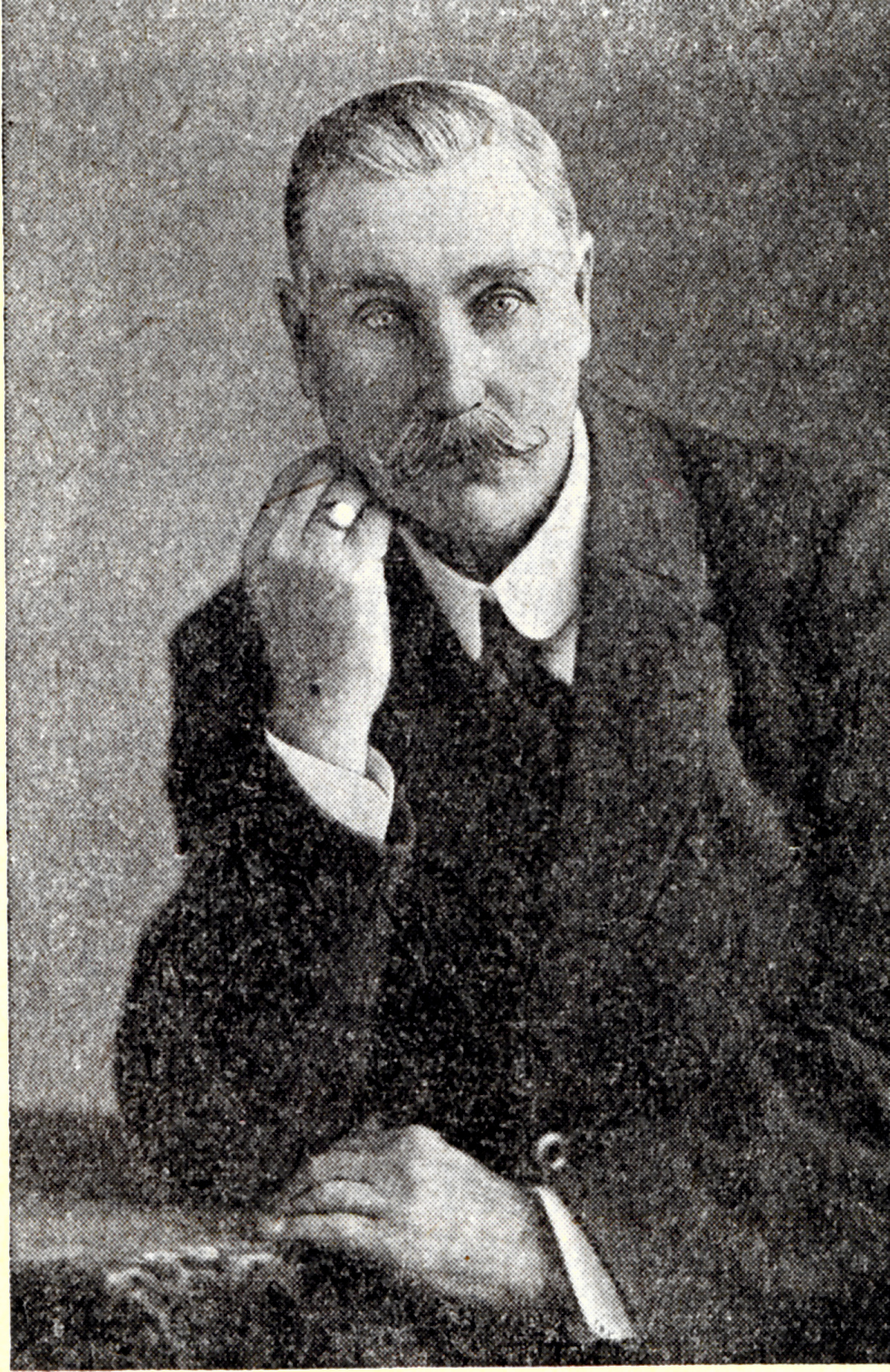
- Born: 6 August 1864; Kuksema Parish, Järva County, Estonia
- Died: 19 February 1929 (aged 64); Nõmmküla Parish, Järva County, Estonia
- Occupations: writer, journalist and politician
- Known for: member of I Riigikogu

Otto Münther (6 August 1864 Kuksema Parish, Järva County – 19 February 1929 Nõmmküla Parish, Järva County) was an Estonian writer, journalist and politician. He was a member of I Riigikogu. On 25 January 1921, he resigned his position and he was replaced by Paul Abramson.
