= Eduard Steinmann =

Estonian politician

Eduard Steinmann (1894 Vaivara Parish, Virumaa – ?) was an Estonian politician. He was a member of I Riigikogu.
