= Alfred Maurer =

Alfred Maurer may refer to:

- Alfred Henry Maurer (1868–1932), American modernist painter
- Alfred Maurer (politician) (1888–1954), Estonian politician
