= Hans Mitt =

Estonian politician (1884–1968)

Hans Mitt (10 December 1884 in Voltveti Parish (now Saarde Parish), Kreis Pernau – 27 January 1968) was an Estonian politician. He was a member of I Riigikogu until his resignation on 7 January 1921. He was replaced by Ado Rõõmussaar.
