= Paul Abramson (politician) =

Estonian politician

Paul Abramson (5 October 1889 Pala Parish (now Peipsiääre Parish), Kreis Dorpat – 20 January 1976) was an Estonian politician. He was a member of I Riigikogu. He was a member of the assembly since 25 January 1921. He replaced Otto Münther. On 26 October 1921, he was removed from his position and he was replaced by Johann Anderson.
