= Karl Piirisild =

Estonian politician

Karl Piirisild (2 April 1890 Orava Parish, Võru County – 15 September 1965) was an Estonian politician. He was a member of I Riigikogu. He was a member of the Riigikogu since 4 December 1922. He replaced Johannes Semm.
