= Johannes Koppel =

Estonian politician (1887–1943)

Johannes Koppel (also Juhan Koppel; 14 March 1887 Pihtla Parish, Saare County – 14 July 1943 Kemerovo Oblast, Russia) was an Estonian politician. He was a member of I Riigikogu. He was a member of the Riigikogu since 7 October 1921. He replaced Georg Tamm.
