= Sergei Andrejev =

Estonian communist politician (1897–1930)

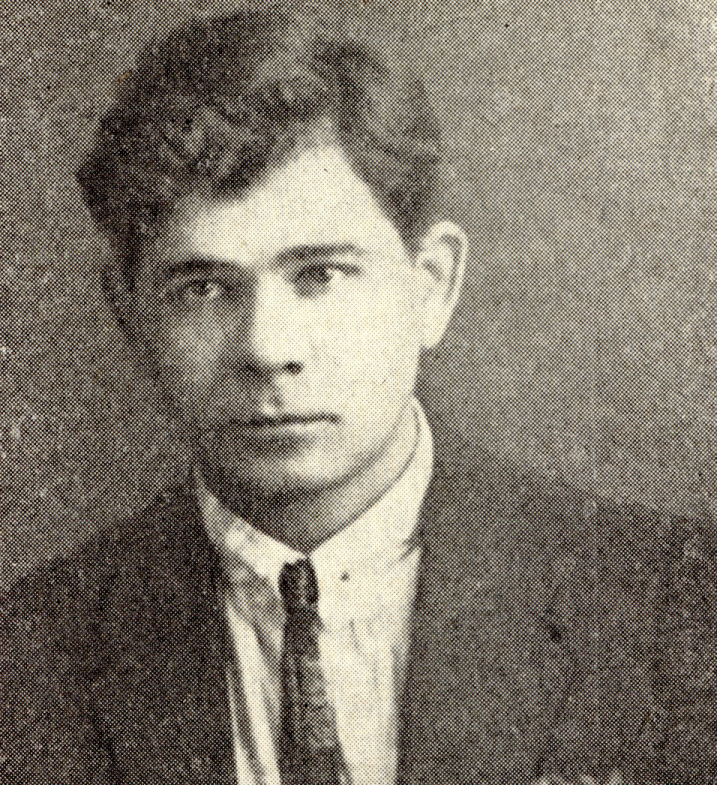
- Born: 16 October 1897; Tallinn
- Died: 12 February 1930 (aged 32); Kirghiz ASSR
- Cause of death: fighting in the Red Army against peasants
- Occupation: Communist
- Known for: member of the Riigikogu for Estonian Independent Socialist Workers' Party
- Political party: Communist Party, Communist Party of Estonia

Sergei Andrejev (16 October 1897, Tallinn – 12 February 1930, Kirghiz ASSR) was an Estonian Communist who was a member of the Riigikogu for the Estonian Independent Socialist Workers' Party for a brief period in 1922.

Andrejev was a member of the Communist Party from 1917 onward and helped organise the Red Guards in Estonia. In the autumn of 1920, he was a clerk at the Tallinn Central Council for Unity, and in December of that year, participated in the creation of the Young Proletarians' Association.

In the elections of 1921, he was elected to the Tallinn City Council. He became a member of the Independent Socialist Workers' Party.

Andrejev was arrested in the spring of 1921. Despite this, he replaced Johannes Soans in the Riigikogu on 15 March 1922. In May 1922, he was sentenced to 115 years of forced labor by the War Circle Court, after which he went underground and began work at the Estonian Section of the Comintern in Moscow. From 6 December 1922, he was replaced by Alfred Maurer in the Riigikogu.

Andrejev was a member of the Communist Party of Estonia Central Committee from 1922 to 1923 and again from 1928 to 1929.

He died fighting in the Red Army near the Syr Darya river in 1930, fighting against rebelling peasants.
