= Mihkel Haus =

Estonian politician

Mihkel Haus (1880–?) was an Estonian politician. He was a member of I Riigikogu. He was a member of the assembly since 10 May 1921. He replaced Jaan Kurgemaa. On 16 July 1921, he resigned his position and he was replaced by Jüri Reinthal.
