= Villem Tiideman =

Estonian politician

Villem Tiideman (1884 Rapla Parish, Kreis Harrien – ?) was an Estonian politician. He was a member of I Riigikogu. He was a member of the Riigikogu since 19 October 1921. He replaced Jaan Santa. On 15 November 1921, he resigned his position and he was replaced by Jaan Leeto.
