= Georg Tamm =

Estonian politician

Georg Tamm (also Jüri Tamm; born 1867) was an Estonian politician. He was a member of I Riigikogu. On 7 October 1921, he resigned his position and he was replaced by Johannes Koppel.
