= Johannes Reesen =

Estonian politician (1900–1937)

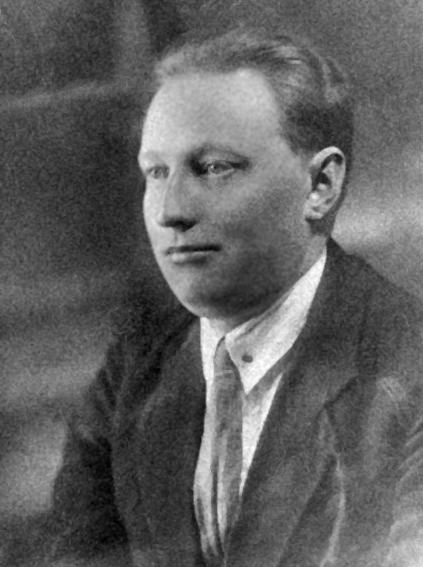
Image of Johannes Reesen

Johannes Reesen (1 February 1900 Puiatu Parish (now Viljandi Parish), Kreis Fellin – 11 November 1937, Leningrad) was an Estonian politician. He was a member of I Riigikogu. He was a member of the Riigikogu since 29 September 1922. He replaced Johannes Vanja.
