= Artur Liiberg =

Estonian politician

Artur Liiberg (1884–?) was an Estonian politician. He was a member of I Riigikogu. On 6 December 1921, he resigned his position and he was replaced by Jaan Tiks.
