= Tõnis Pedak =

Estonian politician (1878–1955)

Tõnis Pedak (14 March 1878 Kolga-Jaani Parish, Viljandi County – 22 January 1955 Pestšanlag, Karaganda Oblast, Russia) was an Estonian politician. He was a member of I Riigikogu. He was a member of the Riigikogu since 21 October 1921. He replaced Peeter Puusepp.
