= Jaak Jakobson =

Estonian politician

Jaak Jakobson (born 1867) was an Estonian politician. He was a member of I Riigikogu from 29 March to 7 April 1922. He replaced Arnold Sommerling, then resigned his position and was replaced by Adolf Leevald.

On 6 December 1921, prior to taking the position, he had emigrated to Soviet Russia.
