= Paula Järv =

Estonian politician

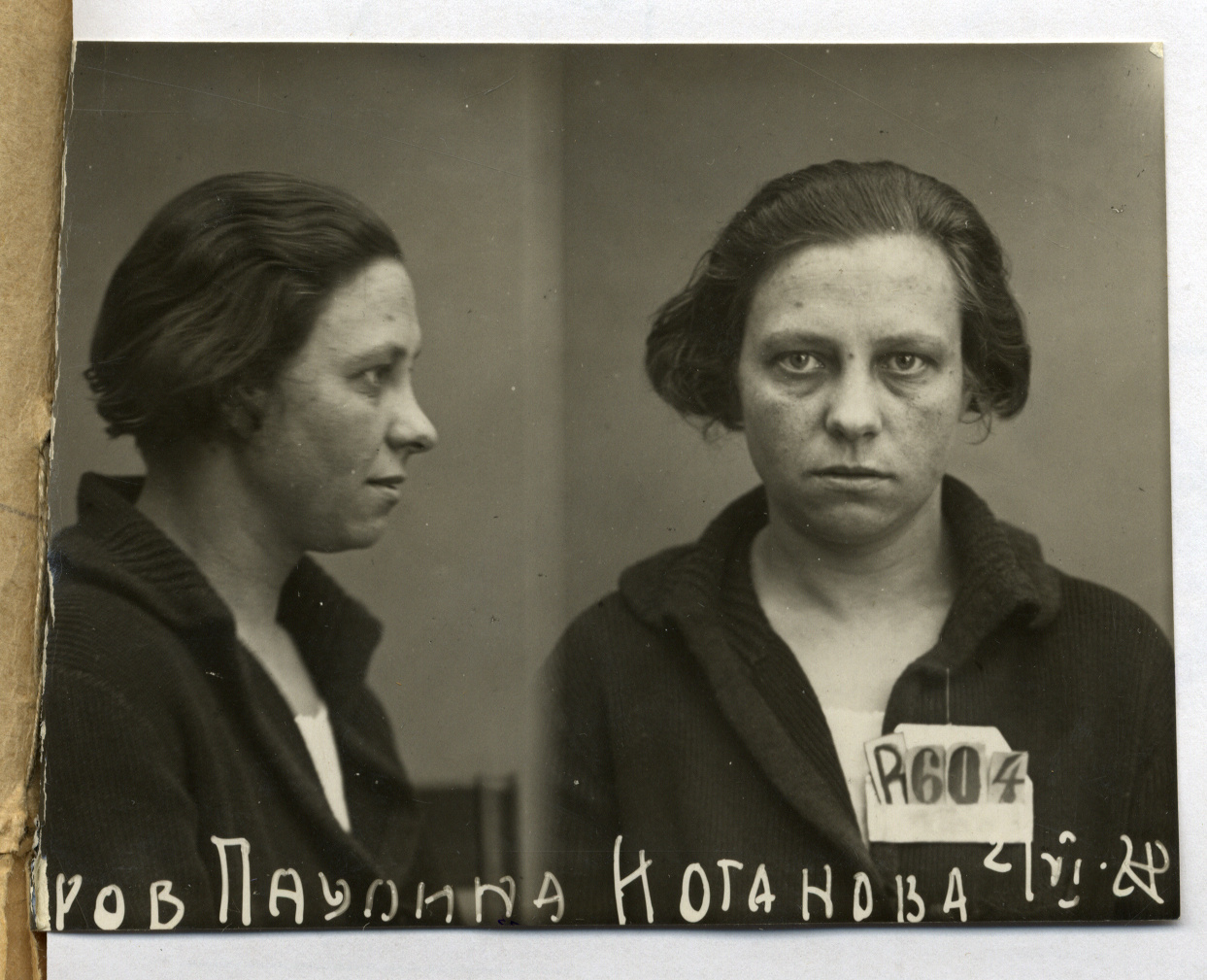
Paula Järv

Paula Järv (née Paula Kaubi; 1898 Harku Parish, Kreis Harrien – ?) was an Estonian politician. She was a member of I Riigikogu, representing the Estonian Independent Socialist Workers' Party. She was a member of the Riigikogu since 10 March 1922. She replaced Karl Ellis. On 25 April 1922, she resigned her position and was replaced by Karl Tammik.
