= Mats Mõtslane =

Estonian writer and politician

Mart Kiirats (6 January 1884 – 16 November 1956), also known by his pseudonym Mats Mõtslane, was an Estonian writer and politician.

Kiirats was born on 6 January 1884 in Tõstamaa in Pärnu County and became a writer. He was elected to the Estonian Provincial Assembly, which governed the Autonomous Governorate of Estonia between 1917 and 1919; he served the full term and was the Secretary between 27 July and 25 October 1917. He did not sit in the newly formed Republic of Estonia's Asutav Kogu (Constituent Assembly), but was elected to the I Riigikogu, first legislature of the Estonian parliament, in 1920 as a member of the Farmers' Assemblies party. He stepped down on 12 April 1921 and was replaced by Jaan Saul. Kiirats died on 16 November 1956 in Vändra.
