= National Liberal Party (Estonia) =

Estonian political party

The National Liberal Party (Estonian: Rahvuslik Vabameelne Partei, RVP) was a political party in Estonia.

== History ==
The party was established by Johan Pitka in 1922 and ran in the 1923 parliamentary elections, winning four seats with 4% of the vote. The 1926 elections saw its vote share fall to just 1%, and the party lost all four seats. It did not contest national elections again.
