= Johann Anderson (politician) =

Estonian politician

Johann Anderson (also Juhan Anderson; 11 March 1905 Sindi, Russian Empire – ?) was an Estonian politician. He was a member of I Riigikogu. He was a member of the assembly since 26 October 1921. He replaced Paul Abramson. On 11 November 1921, he resigned his position and he was replaced by Voldemar Oras.
