= Eduard Liivak =

Estonian politician (born 1889)

Eduard Liivak (5 August 1889 in Sõmeru Parish, Võru County – ?) was an Estonian politician. He was a member of I Riigikogu.
