= Jaan Saul =

Estonian politician (1866–1954)

Jaan Saul (12 August 1866, in Kuigatsi Parish, Tartu County – 1 February 1954, in Novosibirsk Oblast, Russia) was an Estonian politician. He was a member of I Riigikogu, the Estonian parliament from 1920–1923. He became a Riigikogu member on 12 April 1921, replacing Mart Kiirats.
