= Järve (surname) =

Järve is an Estonian surname. Notable people with the surname include:

- Jaan Järve (1894–1945), Estonian politician
- Peeter Järve (1874–1936), Estonian politician
- Sven Järve (born 1980), Estonian fencer
