= Ado Rõõmussaar =

Estonian politician (1891–1970)

Ado Rõõmussaar (2 June 1891 – 11 March 1970) was an Estonian politician. He was a member of the I Riigikogu from 7 to 18 January 1921, when he resigned. He succeeded Hans Mitt and was replaced by Andres Lilienblatt.

Rõõmussaar was born in Uue-Vändra Parish (now part of Põhja-Pärnumaa Parish) in Pärnu County. He was a farmer and later worked as an accountant at Vatla manor. From 1917 until 1920, and again from 1930 until 1931, he was the Mayor of Uue-Vändra Parish.
