= Lui Olesk =

Estonian politician (1876–1932)

Lui Olesk (12 October 1876 in Kavastu Parish (now Luunja Parish), Kreis Dorpat – 19 February 1932 in Tartu) was an Estonian politician. He was a member of the I Riigikogu, representing the Estonian Labour Party, up until December 1921; Oskar Rudolf Jüriväli subsequently succeeded him in the Riigikogu.

In 1919, he served as Minister of Justice.
