= Jüri Rooberg =

Estonian politician

Jüri Rooberg (born 9 January 1892 – ?) was an Estonian politician and labor movement figure. He was a member of I Riigikogu. On 7 January 1921, he resigned his position and he was replaced by Johannes Vanja.

Jüri Rooberg was born in Raasiku Parish. From 1905 until 1911, he was manor worker, from 1911 until 1912, he worked as a laborer at the Dvigatel metal factor in Tallinn and the A. M. Luther factory and as a lathe apprentice at F. Wiegand's machine factory. From 1914 until 1921, he worked at the Tallinn Port Factories as a lathe operator. He was elected to I Riigikogu I on the list of the Central Council of Trade Unions in Tallinn (deputy chairman of the Central Council of Trade Unions in Tallinn), but immediately resigned. He was a member of the Tallinn City Council.

Rooberg was one of the founders of the Association of Young Proletarians. In the spring of 1921, he was arrested and taken into custody as one of 115 communists activists accused of belonging to a communist secret organization and sedition against the state. During the trial, he resigned from his position in the Riigikogu. He was acquitted of the charges. Following the trial, he worked as a salesman. In 1929, he was arrested once again for embezzlement and served a nearly year-long prison sentence. He later returned to work as a lathe operator through the 1930s and into the early 1940s. In 1941, during the German occupation of Estonia during World War II, German authorities imprisoned Rooberg for several months. Following his release, he worked as a factory foreman at the National Union Factory No. 9 in Tallinn. His fate following World War II is unknown.
