= Adolf Leevald =

Estonian politician (1893–1938)

Adolf Leevald (or Levald; 1893, Varbola Parish – 1938) was an Estonian politician. He became a member of I Riigikogu on 7 April 1922, when he succeeded Jaak Jakobson. On 29 September of that year, he was removed from his position and replaced by Jaan Tomp.
