= Jakob Meerits =

Estonian politician (1882–??)

Jakob Meerits (born 1882 in Pangodi Parish, Tartu County) was an Estonian politician. He was a member of I Riigikogu. On 7 March 1923, he resigned his position and he was replaced by Vladimir Binsol.
