= Jaan Tiks =

Estonian politician (1887–1942)

Jaan Tiks (16 December 1887 Viljandi – 14 May 1942 Suure-Jaani) was an Estonian politician. He was a member of I Riigikogu. He was a member of the Riigikogu since 6 December 1921. He replaced Artur Liiberg.
