= Villem Aleksander Reinok =

Estonian politician (1882–1958)

Villem Aleksander Reinok (15 March 1882 Riga – 10 March 1958 Tallinn) was an Estonian politician. He was a member of I Riigikogu. He was a member of the Riigikogu since 28 October 1922. He replaced Anton Uesson. On 24 November 1922, he resigned his position and he was replaced by Rudolf Paabo.
