= Johannes Vanja =

Estonian politician (1893–1937)

Johannes Vanja (1893 – 1937 Soviet Union) was an Estonian politician. He was a member of I Riigikogu. since 7 January 1921. He replaced Jüri Rooberg. On 29 September 1922, he resigned his position and was replaced by Johannes Reesen.
