= Peeter Algma =

Estonian politician

Peeter Algma (also Peeter Adamson; 6 December 1885 Holstre Parish (now Viljandi Parish), Kreis Fellin – 18 May 1951 Viljandi) was an Estonian politician. He was a member of I Riigikogu, representing the Estonian Social Democratic Workers' Party. He was a member of the assembly since 12 March 1923. He replaced Johannes Orik.
