= Rudolf Paabo =

Estonian politician (1889–1942)

Rudolf Paabo (also Rudolf or Ruudolph Paap; 18 July 1889, Kavastu Parish, Tartu County – 19 May 1942, Kirov Oblast, Russia) was an Estonian politician. He was a member of the I Riigikogu.

Paabo was a member of the Riigikogu from 24 November 1922, when he replaced Villem Aleksander Reinok. He resigned his position on 19 November 1922, and was replaced by Paul Öpik.
