= Peeter Tarvel =

Estonian politician and historian

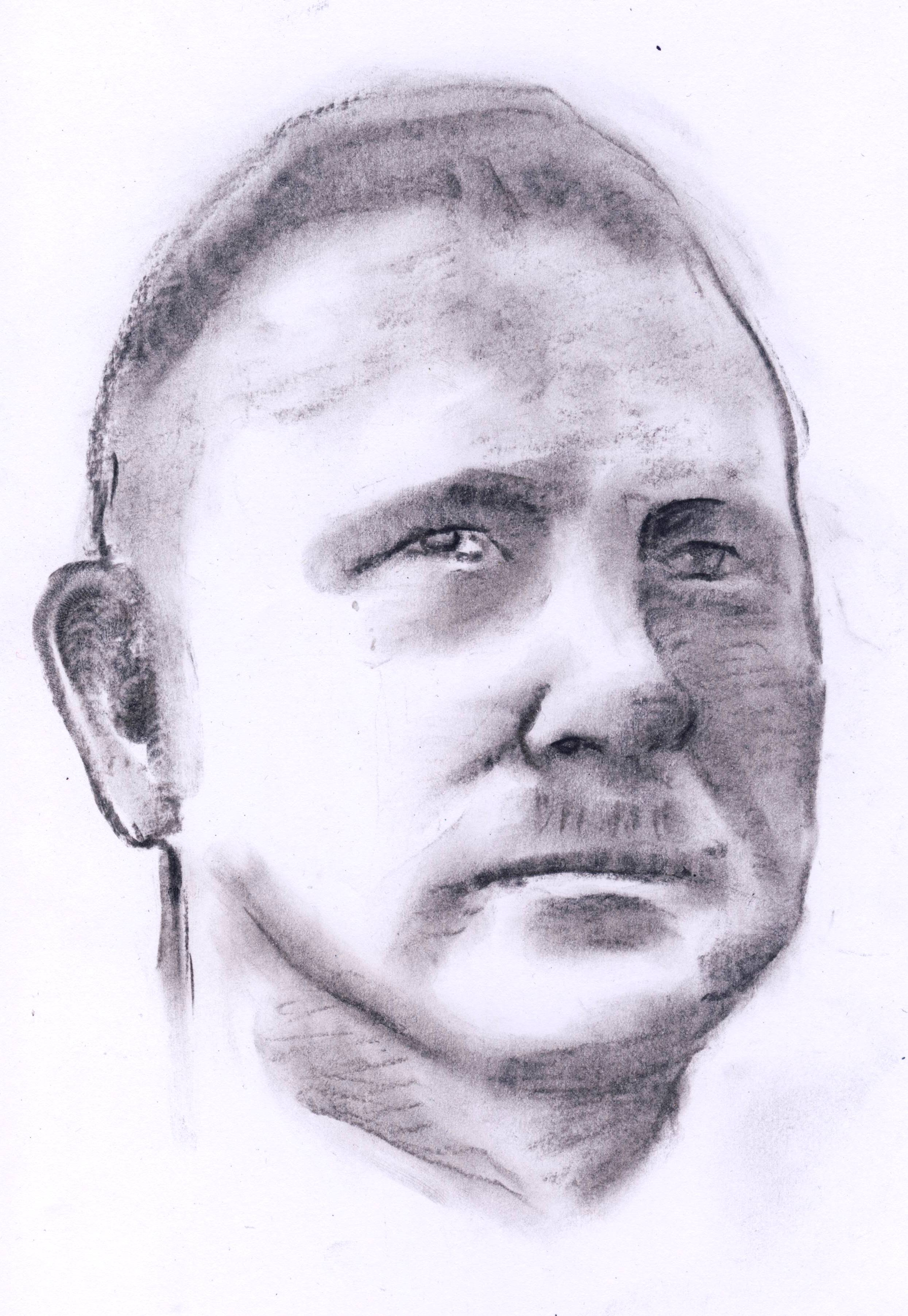
- Born: Peeter Treiberg; 11 July 1894; Koduvere, Governorate of Estonia, Russian Empire
- Died: 19 October 1953 (aged 59); Omsk, Russian SFSR, USSR
- Occupations: Politician and historian

Peeter Tarvel (until 1935 Peeter Treiberg; 11 July 1894 Vihula Parish (now Haljala Parish), Wierland County – 19 October 1953 Omsk, Russian SFSR) was an Estonian politician and historian. He was a member of I Riigikogu. He became a member of the Riigikogu on 18 October 1921. He replaced Artur Bach. On 17 October 1922, he resigned his position and he was replaced by Johannes Lehman. He was sent to a prison camp for "unsociable elements," where he died. He was the uncle of the historian Enn Tarvel.
