= Jaan Santa =

Estonian politician

Jaan Santa (also Jaan or Robert Liimann; 1880–?) was an Estonian politician. He was a member of I Riigikogu. On 19 January 1921, he resigned his position and he was replaced by Villem Tiideman.
