= Peeter Puusepp =

Estonian politician (1868–1949)

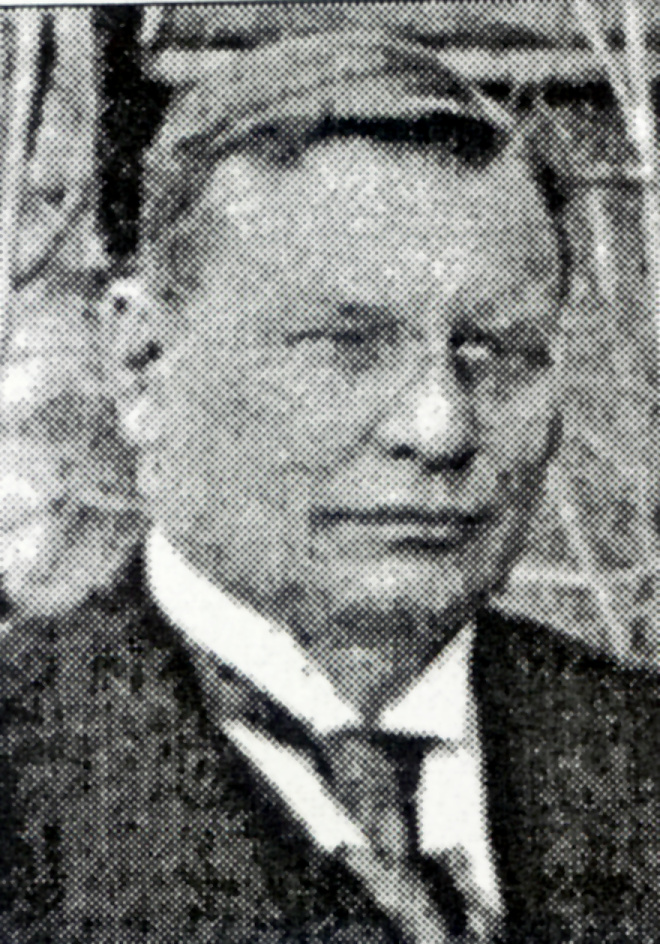
Peeter Puusepp

Peeter Puusepp (also Peeter Puusep; 22 February 1868 Loodi Parish, Viljandi County – 19 May 1949 Geislingen, Germany) was an Estonian politician and justice of the Supreme Court of Estonia. He was a member of I Riigikogu. On 21 October 1921, he resigned his position and he was replaced by Tõnis Pedak.
