= Voldemar Oras =

Estonian politician

Voldemar Oras (also Voldemar Orras; 29 September 1885 Tallinn – ?) was an Estonian politician. He was a member of I Riigikogu. He was a member of the Riigikogu since 11 November 1921. He replaced Johann Anderson.
