= Voldemar Linnamägi =

Estonian politician (1881–1948)

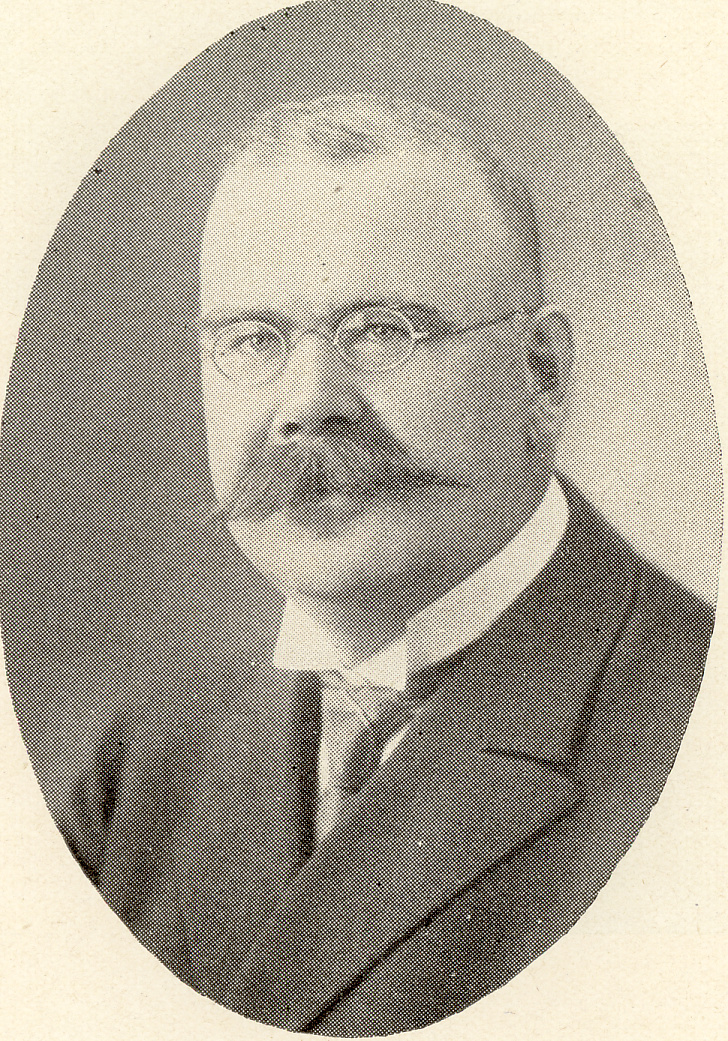
Voldemar Linnamägi

Voldemar Linnamägi (4 November 1881 Tallinn – 2 January 1948) was an Estonian politician. He was a member of I Riigikogu.
