= Peeter Koemets =

Estonian politician (1868–1950)

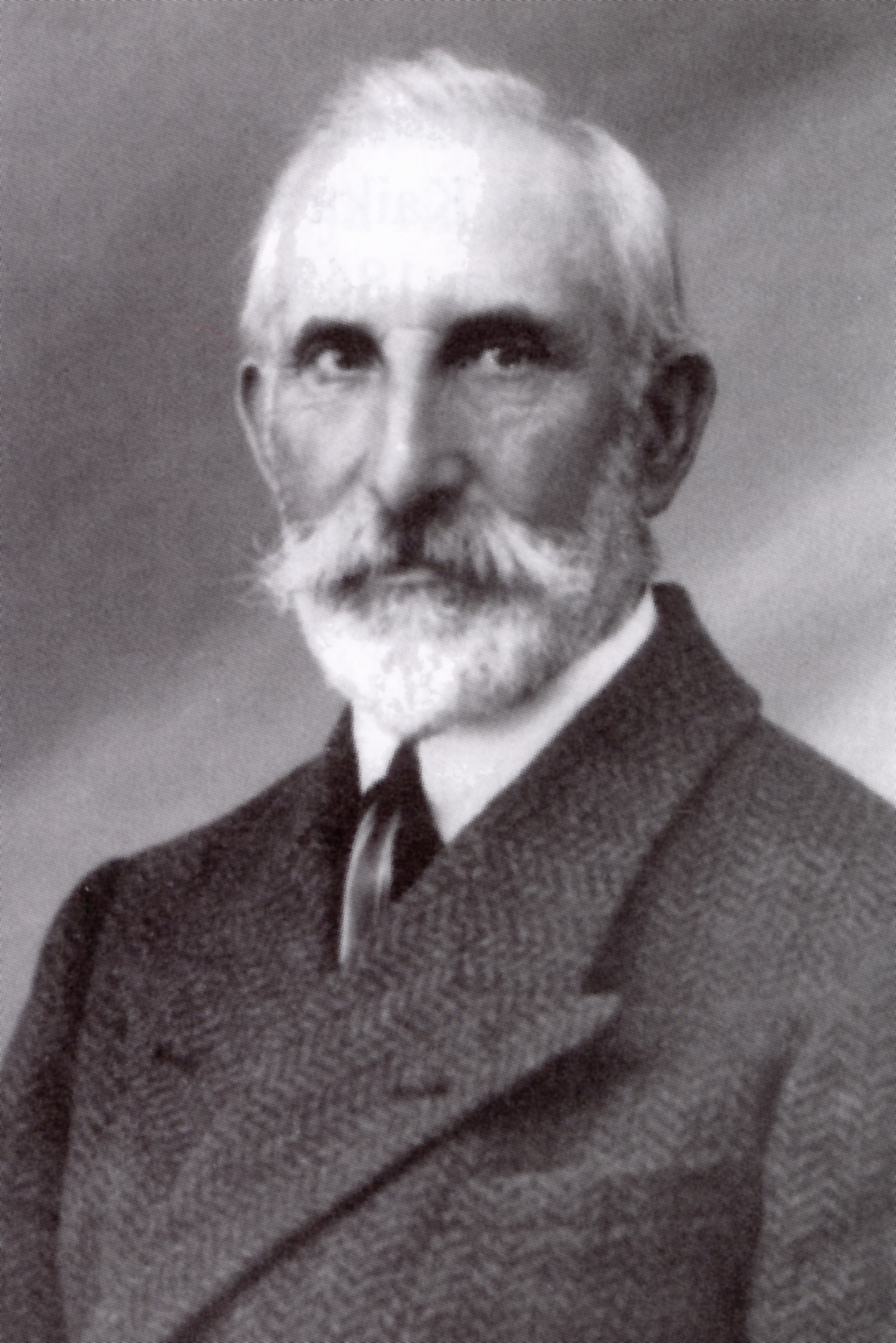
Peeter Koemets

Peeter Koemets (13 January 1868 Vana-Antsla Parish, Võru County – 1950 Omsk Oblast, Russia) was an Estonian Lutheran clergyman and politician. He was a member of I Riigikogu and former Mayor of Vana-Antsla Parish. His younger brother was politician Kael Koemets.
