= Juhan Ennulo =

Estonian politician

Juhan Ennulo (bon Johannes Orik; 3 January 1898 Vana-Võidu Parish (now Viljandi Parish), Kreis Fellin – 27 February 1982 Tallinn) was an Estonian politician. He was a member of I Riigikogu, representing the Estonian Social Democratic Workers' Party. He was a member of the Riigikogu since 2 March 1923. He replaced Aleksander Tulp. On 12 March 1923, he resigned his position and he was replaced by Peeter Adamson.
