= Tenants' Union (political party) =

Estonian political party

The Tenants' Union (Estonian: Üürnikkude Liit) was a political party in Estonia.

== History ==
The party first ran in national elections in 1923, when it won a single seat in the parliamentary elections with 1.3% of the vote. Despite maintaining their vote share in the 1926 elections, the party lost its only seat in the Riigikogu due to the electoral threshold being raised to require parties to win a minimum of two seats.

The party did not contest any further elections.
