= Karl Mikita =

Estonian politician (1879–1933)

Karl Mikita (26 February 1879 Pärnu – 29 July 1933 Tallinn) was an Estonian politician. He was a member of I Riigikogu. He was a member of the Riigikogu since 18 January 1923. He replaced Paul Öpik.
