= Oskar Rudolf Jüriväli =

Estonian politician

Oskar Rudolf Jüriväli (also Oskar Rudolf Jürgenfeldt; 29 November 1884 in Paide, Kreis Jerwen – 22 May 1955 in Pilistvere) was an Estonian politician and pedagogue. He was a member of I Riigikogu, representing the Estonian Labour Party. He became a member of the Riigikogu on 16 December 1921 when he replaced Lui Olesk.
