= Jaan Kurgemaa =

Estonian politician (1894–1937)

Jaan Kurgemaa (1894–1937) was an Estonian politician. He was a member of I Riigikogu. He was a member of the Riigikogu since 5 April 1921. He replaced Jaan Reinberg. On 10 May 1921, he resigned his position and he was replaced by Mihkel Haus.
