= Jaan Reinberg =

Estonian politician

Jaan Reinberg (1872–?) was an Estonian politician. He was a member of I Riigikogu. On 5 April 1921, he resigned his position and he was replaced by Jaan Kurgemaa.
