= Jaan Leeto =

Estonian politician (1879–1922)

Jaan Leeto (1879 – August 1922 Tallinn) was an Estonian politician. He was a member of I Riigikogu from 15 November 1921, when he replaced Villem Tiideman. On 14 March 1922, he resigned his position and he was replaced by Arnold Sommerling.
