= Hermann-Leopold Ammende =

Estonian politician

- Born: 1 November 1855; Pärnu
- Died: 26 August 1934 (aged 78); Pärnu
- Occupation: Politician

Hermann-Leopold Ammende (1 November 1855 Pärnu – 26 August 1934 Pärnu) was an Estonian politician. He was a member of I Riigikogu. On 4 January 1921, he resigned his position and he was replaced by Walter von Pezold.

Hermann Leopold Ammende (October 20, 1855, Pärnu – August 26, 1934, Pärnu) was a merchant of Baltic German origin from Pärnu.

Hermann Leopold Ammende's father, Jacob Dietrich Ammende (1811–1898), was a wealthy merchant and the owner of the first Pärnu Department Store, Jacob Diedrich Ammende in Pärnu, founded in 1837. After Jacob Dietrich Ammende's death, the department store was first inherited by Hermann Ammende's older brother Karl Heinrich Ammende, and after the latter's death in 1901, Jacob Diedrich Ammende became the owner of the Ammende department store. The Ammende department store was located on the corner of Rüütli and Nikolai streets and sold so-called colonial goods (food, textiles, leather, rubber, etc.).

In 1904, Hermann Ammende was looking for a suitable house in Pärnu for his daughter's wedding, but, unable to find one, he ordered a luxurious villa project from a St. Petersburg architectural firm and organized the construction of the Ammende villa. The building was completed in 1905.

In 1920, Hermann Ammende was elected a member of the First Parlament of Estonia, but resigned from his position on 4 January 1921.[4] In 1921, he was elected a member of the Pärnu City Council.

In 1927, the family ran into financial difficulties, and in 1928, the Jakob Diedrich Ammende joint-stock company was liquidated and the Ammende villa was sold to the city of Pärnu for 8 million marks.
