= Andres Lilienblatt =

Estonian politician

Andres Lilienblatt (18 May 1871 Pärnu County – ?) was an Estonian politician. He was a member of I Riigikogu. He was a member of the Riigikogu since 18 January 1921. He replaced Ado Rõõmussaar.
