= Karl Liivak =

Estonian politician (1874–1941)

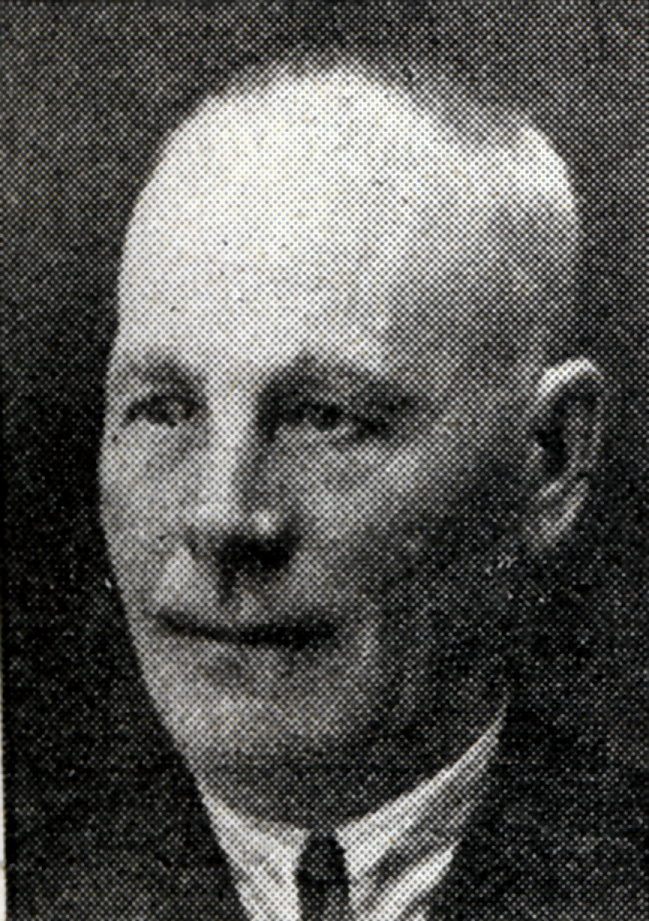
Karl Liivak

Karl Liivak (9 August 1874 Uue-Vändra Parish, Pärnu County – 7 July 1941) was an Estonian politician. He was a member of I Riigikogu from 18 October 1922. He replaced Julius Seljamaa.
