= Armin Öpik =

Estonian paleontologist

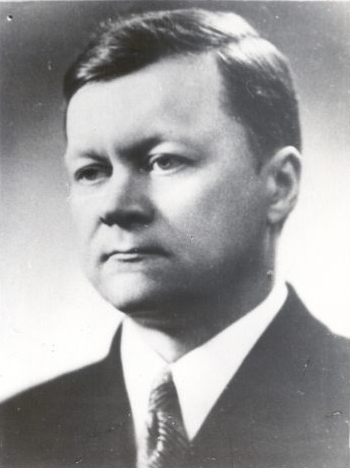
- Armin Öpik, during 1930s
- Born: 24 June 1898; Lontova (now in Kunda), Estonia, Russian Empire
- Died: 15 January 1983 (aged 84); Canberra, Australia
- Education: Estonian State University at Tartu
- Scientific career
- Fields: paleontology
- Workplaces: University of Tartu Geological Museum, Tartu
- Doctoral advisor: Hendrik Bekker

Armin Aleksander Öpik (24 June 1898, in Kunda – 15 January 1983, in Canberra) was an Estonian paleontologist who spent the second half of his career (from 1948) at the Bureau of Mineral Resources in Australia.

== Early life ==
He was born on at the village Lontova, now a quarter of Kunda in Estonia and died in Canberra. His father Karl Heinrich Öpik was a harbormaster and his mother was Leontine Johanna Öpik (née Freiwald). He had five brothers and one sister. His oldest brother Paul Öpik, later a director of the Bank of Estonia, introduced Armin to fossils. His sister Anna was a philologist, fluent in 14 languages, including Sanskrit. His brother Oskar was a diplomat. His brother Ernst was a famous astronomer. During the First World War he got to know Barbara Potaschko (died in 1977, Canberra). They had one son and three daughters. Öpik is mostly known for his work on the Cambrian and Lower Ordovician stratigraphy and paleontology of northern Australia.

== Studies and work in Estonia ==
Öpik graduated from the Nicolai Gymnasium with high grades in 1917. He studied geology and mineralogy at the Estonian State University at Tartu. He was lecturer at that institution in geology and mineralogy (1929–30). In 1930 he became professor of geology and paleontology and director of the Geological Institute and Museum, until 1944. Öpik's published on stratigraphic correlation, facies distribution, paleogeography and biostratonomy of the Cambrian and lower Ordovician in Estonia. He studied Ordovician brachiopods and published monographies on several subgroups. Öpik published papers on Ordovician ostracodes. In 1937 he finished a major publication, Trilobiten aus Estland [Trilobites of Estonia]. When the Russian army threatened to overrun his country of birth in 1944, Öpik fled with his family. He lived in displaced persons' camps in Germany until his emigration to Australia in 1948.

== Work in Australia ==
Öpik was assisted by C. Teichert and H. Raggatt, director of the newly established Bureau of Mineral Resources, to immigrate to Australia and start working at the Melbourne office of the Bureau of Mineral Resources. The next year he transferred to Canberra (1949). He began studies on the Ordovician to Devonian stratigraphy of the Australian Capital Territory. From 1952 to 1982, Öpik made 27 publications on Cambrian stratigraphy and paleontology. He described 94 new genera and 294 new species of Cambrian trilobites. He also studied Cambrian agnostid trilobites. In 1962 he became fellow of the Australian Academy of Science.

== Eponymy ==
The Silurian crinoid genus Oepikicrinus Ausich, Wilson & Toom, 2019 is named in his honour.
