= Madis Rookman =

Estonian politician (1871–1943)

Madis Rookman (24 December 1871 – 5 August 1943) was an Estonian politician. He was a member of the I Riigikogu. He was a member of the Riigikogu from 7 April 1922, when he replaced Aksel Kallas, until the end of the session. He was a member of the Christian People's Party. He was born in Kolga Parish (now Kuusalu Parish), Kreis Harrien, in the Governorate of Estonia. He died in Kolga Parish, Harju County. His grave is located in Kuusalu Cemetery in Harju County, Estonia.
