= Johan Teng =

Estonian politician (1895–1979)

Johan Teng (forenames also Johannes, Juhan or Ivan; surname variant Volin or Voolin; 20 August 1895 Viljandi County – 28 December 1979 Tallinn) was an Estonian politician. He was a member of I Riigikogu. He was a member of the Riigikogu since 5 May 1922. He replaced Karl Tammik. On 29 September 1922, he was removed from his position and he was replaced by Aleksander Jaakson.
