= Jüri Reintalu =

Estonian politician

Jüri Reintalu (also Jüri Reinthal; 1895–?) was an Estonian politician. He was a member of I Riigikogu. He was a member of the Riigikogu since 16 July 1921. He replaced Mihkel Haus. On 15 November 1921, he resigned his position and he was replaced by Aleksander Prass.
