= Johannes Semm =

Estonian politician (1882–1942)

Johannes Semm (also Johannes or Johan Semmiste; 20 July 1882, in Koiola Parish, Võru County – 22 February 1942, in Kirov Oblast, Russian SFSR, USSR) was an Estonian politician. He was a member of I Riigikogu. He was a member of the Riigikogu since 7 January 1921. He replaced Jaan Kriisa. On 4 December 1922, he resigned his position and he was replaced by Karl Piirisild.
