= Tahvo Kruus =

Finnish farmer, bank director and politician

Staffan (Tahvo) Kruus (29 December 1862, Valkjärvi - 15 November 1918) was a Finnish farmer, bank director and politician. He was a member of the Parliament of Finland from 1 June 1909 (representing the Eastern constituency of the Vyborg province) to 28 February 1910, representing the Finnish Party.

Kruus' parents were locksmith Petter Kruus and Anna Karhu. Kruus was a farmer and land trader in Kivennava from 1890 to 1918, and in 1918 he also worked as the manager of the Terijoki branch of the National Equity Bank.

Kruus was a Member of Parliament from 1909 to 1910, representing the eastern constituency of Vyborg Oblast. He also served as head of the Kivennava municipal council and was a member of the council that opposed the unification of the New Church and Kivennava into the St. Petersburg governorate in the early 1910s. Tahvo Kruus was married in 1883 to Anna Sirkia (formerly Seppänen). He remarried in 1886 to Maria Havia.
