= Paul Leis =

Estonian politician (1874–1947)

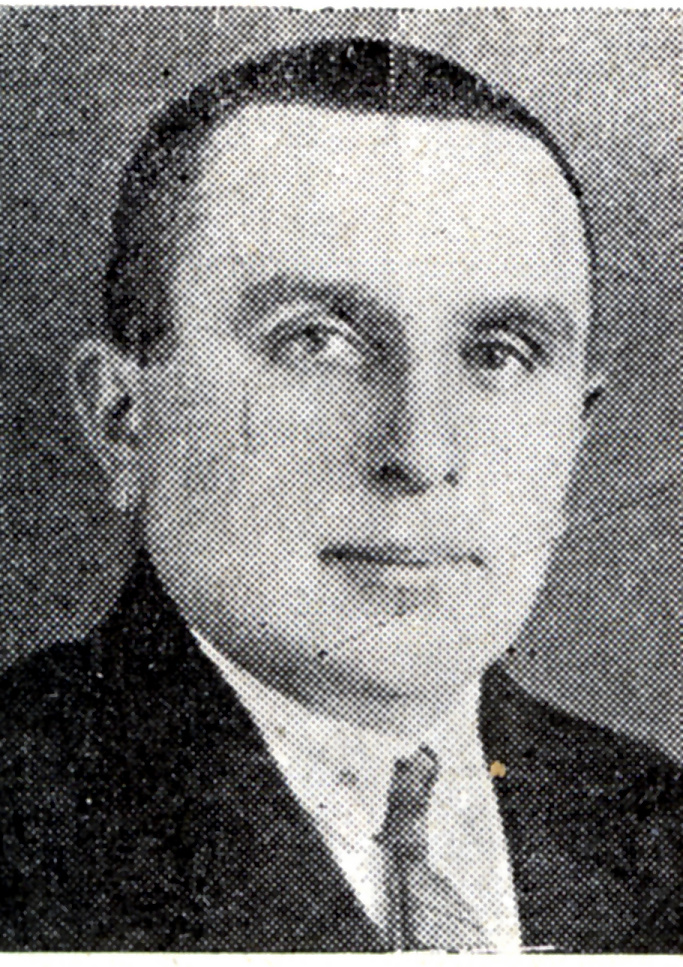
Paul Leis

Paul Leis (14 November 1874 Erastvere Parish, Võru County – 16 January 1947 Kanepi Parish, Võru County) was an Estonian politician. He was a member of I Riigikogu. On 12 April 1921, he resigned his position and he was replaced by Karl Ipsberg.
