= Paul Öpik =

Estonian politician (1888–1967)

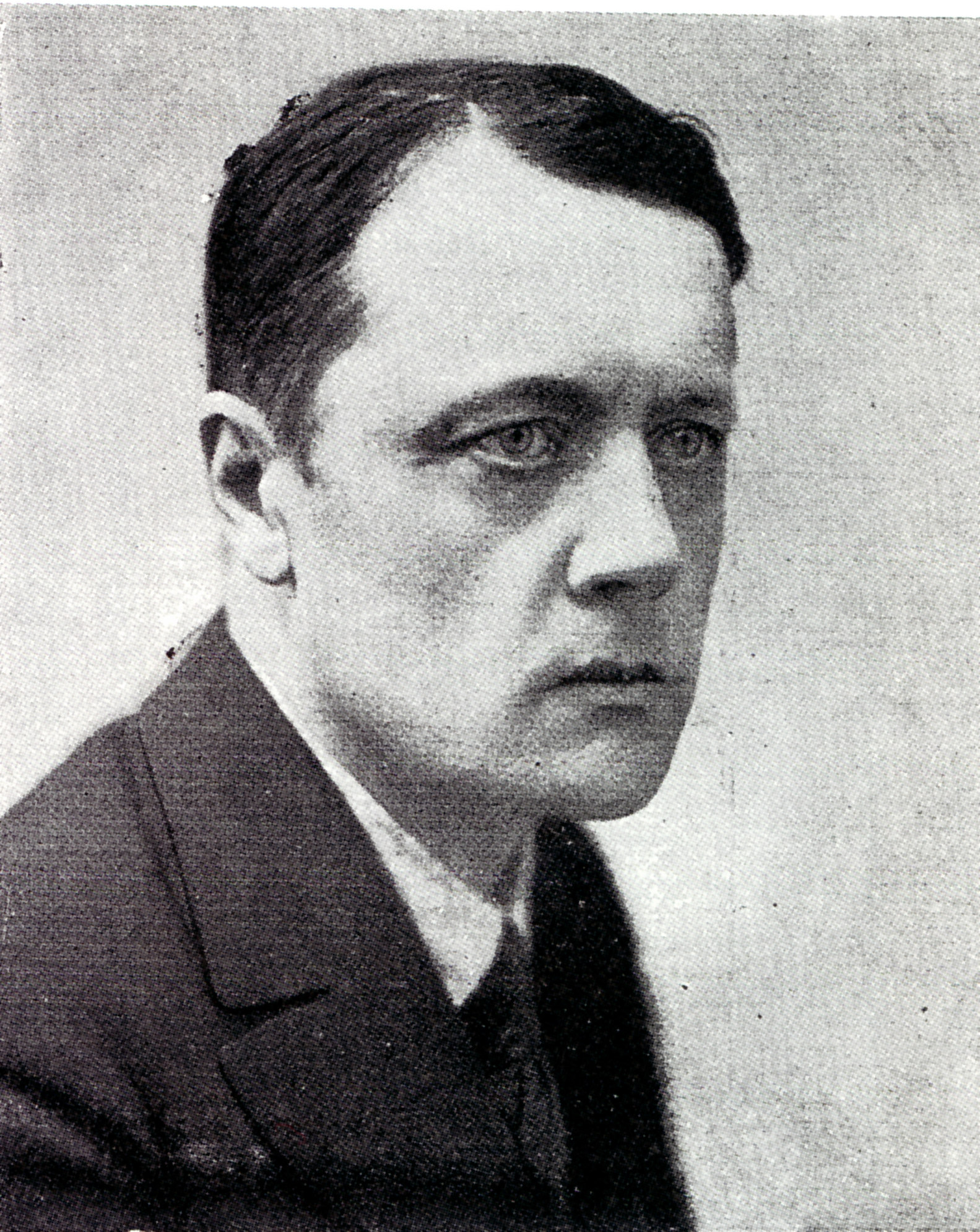
Paul Öpik

Paul Öpik (22 January 1888 Tallinn – 23 April 1967 Tallinn) was an Estonian politician. He was a member of I Riigikogu. He was a member of the parliament (Riigikogu) from 29 November 1922. He replaced Rudolf Paabo. On 25 January 1923, he resigned his position and he was replaced by Karl Mikita.
