= Hans Kruus =

Estonian historian and politician

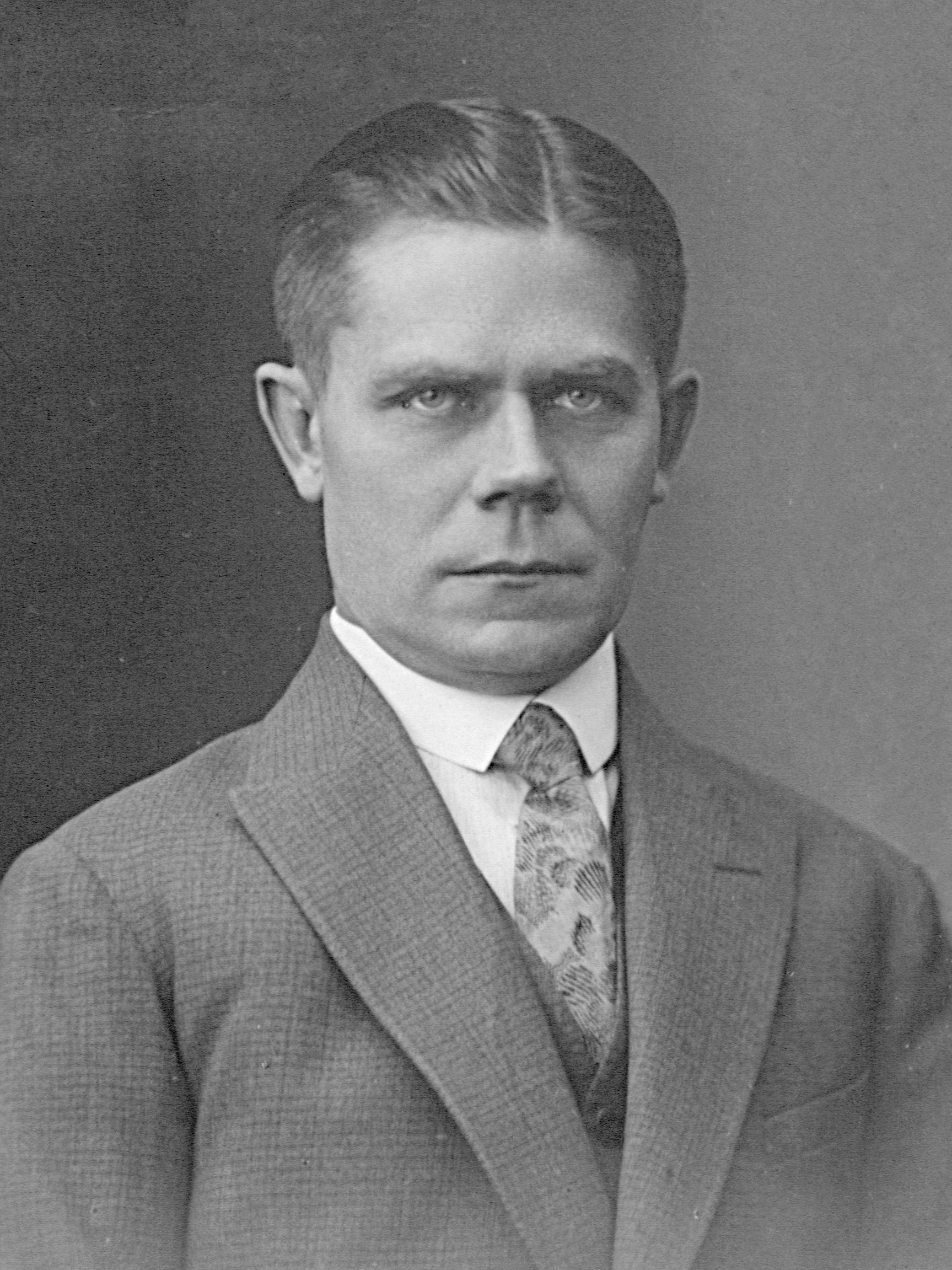
Hans Kruus

Hans Johannes Kruus (22 October 1891 – 30 June 1976) was an Estonian historian, academic and politician. As well as sitting in the Estonian parliament and the Supreme Soviet of the Estonian SSR, he was Deputy Prime Minister of Estonia in 1940 and Foreign Minister of the Estonian SSR between 1944 and 1950. He was also Rector of the University of Tartu in 1940–41 and in 1944.

== Early life and education ==
Kruus was born on 22 October 1891 in Tartu, to Hans Kruus (1847–1929), a woodworker in a table factory, caretaker and housekeeper, and his wife Anu Matsi (1846–1929), the daughter of a tenant farmer. In 1900, he moved with his family to a farm his father had purchased. Educated at Tartu Teachers' College between 1907 and 1911, Kruus worked as a teacher until he joined the History Faculty at the University of Tartu in 1914. He served in the First World War in the Estonian Regiment of the Imperial Russian Army from 1916, and first became involved with politics in this time.

== Career ==
=== Early politics and return to academia ===
Kruus was elected to the Estonian Provincial Assembly which governed the newly formed Autonomous Governorate of Estonia in July 1917, but also sat on the Estonian Soldiers' Supreme Soviet. He was a founding member of the pro-independence and left-wing Estonian Socialist Revolutionary Party, which he led from September 1917 to 1921. When Estonia gained independence following the end of the Estonian War of Independence, he was elected to sit on the Constituent Assembly and became chairman of the central committee of his party, reformed as the Independent Socialist Workers Party. He also sat as a member of the first legislature of the Riigikogu (1920–23), but resigned on 3 October 1922 to focus on academia; he was replaced by Jaan Kalla. He completed an undergraduate degree in 1923 and eventually received at doctorate nine years later from the University of Tartu. He became a professor of history there, and in 1934 became Professor of Nordic History and Pro-Rector of the University (holding the latter post until 1937).

=== Soviet politics, academic legacy and later life ===
Kruus was in favour of the Soviet occupation of Estonia in 1940, served as Deputy Prime Minister 21 June 1940 to 25 August 1940 and was a member of the Supreme Soviet of the Estonian SSR as a member of the Communist Party. He based himself in the USSR during the German occupation (1941–44) and then resumed his interest in Estonian politics when the Soviets reoccupied the territory; he continued to serve in the second Supreme Soviet, which sat from 1947 to 1951 and was Foreign Minister between 28 October 1944 and 8 June 1950. However, he was removed from these offices and his academic positions in 1950 and imprisoned for adhering to "bourgeois nationalism". Released in 1954, he worked at the History Institute at the USSR Academy of Sciences for four years, when he returned to Estonia as senior librarian in the History Institute of the Academy of Sciences.

Kruus's academic career had also included spells as Rector of the University of Tartu (1940–41, 1944) and as President of the Estonian SSR's Academy of Sciences (1946–50). Estonian historians have been critical of his politics and his role played in the Soviet occupation, but he was a major influence on the formation of historical scholarship in Estonia and "despite his variegated political career, Kruus is honoured among Estonian historians as one of the founders of the professional scholarly study of history in Estonia". His books included Linn ja Kula Eestis (1920), Eesti Ajaloo Lugemik (1924–29) and Vene-Liivi soda (1924). He was editor of Ajaloo Ajakiri between 1932 and 1936.

Kruus died on 30 June 1976 in Tallinn.
