= Rudolf Kallas =

Estonian clergyman

Rudolf Gottfried Kallas (22 May 1851 – 22 April 1913) was an Estonian clergyman and pedagog.

1871-1875 he was a primary school pedagog in Tartu. In 1883 he graduated from Tartu University. After graduating he had been a pastor in Valga, Rõuge and St. Petersburg.

Until 1881 he was a member of Estonian Literary Society.

His "System der Gedächtnislehre" was the first scientific publication about psychology which was written by an Estonian.

== Works ==
- Mõistlik rehkendaja: Kõigile rehkendamise sõpradele, iseäranis koolmeistritele ning koolidele tuluks ning toeks, 1874
- Ülesannete kogu, 1875
- Mõistliku rehkendaja tarwilisemad õpetused: Kuidas? Miks? ja Millal?, 1878
- Otto Wilhelm Masing (Tähtsad mehed. Toim. M. J. Eisen), 1883
- Die Methodik des elementaren Rechenunterrichts, prinzipiell-systematisch abgeleitet, 1889
- Igawene Ewangelium ehk Rõõmusõnum Jeesusest: Uus jutlus-raamat, 1889
- Meie Issanda Jeesuse Kristuse Armulaud: Seitse raamatut pühast altarisakramendist ning lepitaja ohvrisurmast, 1891
- Saaroni Valge Lill Pulmapäevaks: Perekonna-raamat, 1894
- System der Gedächtnislehre: Ein Beitrag zur Pädagogik, 1897
- Õlipuulehed ehk 31 rahusõna Jeesuse suust wäsinutele: Kuupäewade palweraamat ja pühalikud mõtlemised perekonnale ja üksikule, 1897
- Kunas on meie Issand Jeesus Kristus sündinud?, 1898
- Millal on meie Issand Jeesus ristilöödud?, 1899
- Suur-Reede ehk Paastukannel, 1901
