= August Kerem =

Estonian politician (1889–1942)

August Kerem (11 October 1889 – 28 May 1942 Sosva, Sverdlovsk Oblast, Russian SFSR) was an Estonian politician. He was a member of I Riigikogu.

Political offices:

- 1920 Minister of Agriculture
- 1923–1925 Minister of Agriculture
- 1929–1931 Minister of Agriculture
- 1926–1928 Minister of Communications
- 1931–1932 Minister of Defence
- 1932–1933 Minister of Defence
