= Walter von Pezold =

Estonian politician (1882–1955)

Walter von Pezold (20 September 1882 Tallinn – 3 June 1955 Hamburg, West Germany) was a politician. He was a member of I Riigikogu. He was a member of the Riigikogu since 4 January 1921. He replaced Hermann-Leopold Ammende. In addition, from 4 January 1921, he was also Riigikogu's Second Assistant Secretary.
