= Jaan-Johann Bergmann =

Estonian politician

Jaan-Johann Bergmann (31 January 1867 Elistvere Parish (now Tartu Parish), Kreis Dorpat – 30 September 1938 Tallinn) was an Estonian politician. He was a member of I Riigikogu, and from 4 January 1921 to 30 May 1923 was its First Assistant Secretary.
