= Johannes Vilmann =

Estonian politician

Johannes Vilmann (also Johannes or Juhan Villman; 10 March 1875 Taebla Parish, Lääne County – ?) was an Estonian politician. He was a member of I Riigikogu. He was a member of the Riigikogu since 25 September 1922. He replaced Jüri Uluots.
