= Demobilised Soldiers' Union =

Estonian political party

The Demobilised Soldiers' Union (Estonian: Demobiliseeritud Sõjaväelaste Liit) was a political party in Estonia between 1921 and 1925.

== History ==
The party was established in 1923. In the elections that year it won a single seat in the Riigikogu (taken by Heinrich Laretei) with 1.2% of the vote.

The party was dissolved in 1925 after the Estonian Defence League was re-established.
