= Timotheus Grünthal =

Estonian politician (1893–1955)

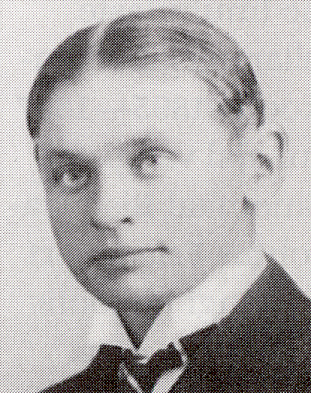
Timotheus Grünthal

Timotheus Grünthal (or Timoteus Grünthal; 29 June 1893 Hellamaa Parish, Muhumaa – 29 May 1955 Lidingö, Sweden) was an Estonian politician. He was a member of Estonian Constituent Assembly and of the I Riigikogu, representing the Estonian Labour Party.

== Personal life ==
Timotheus Grünthal was married to feminist and lawyer Vera Poska-Grünthal, daughter of politician and lawyer Jaan Poska. American lawyer Sharon L. Gleason is his granddaughter.
