= Johannes Soans =

Estonian politician (31 January 1867– 19 August 1932)

Johannes Soans (also Juhan Soans; 31 January 1867 in Kuivajõe Parish, Harju County – 19 August 1932 Tallinn) was an Estonian politician. He was a member of I Riigikogu. On 15 March 1922, he resigned his position and he was replaced by Sergei Andrejev.
