= Karl Tammik =

Estonian politician

Karl Tammik (?–?) was an Estonian politician. He was a member of I Riigikogu. He was a member of the Riigikogu since 25 April 1922. He replaced Paula Järv. On 5 May 1922, he resigned his position and he was replaced by Johan Teng.
