= Juhan Leeman =

Estonian politician and educator

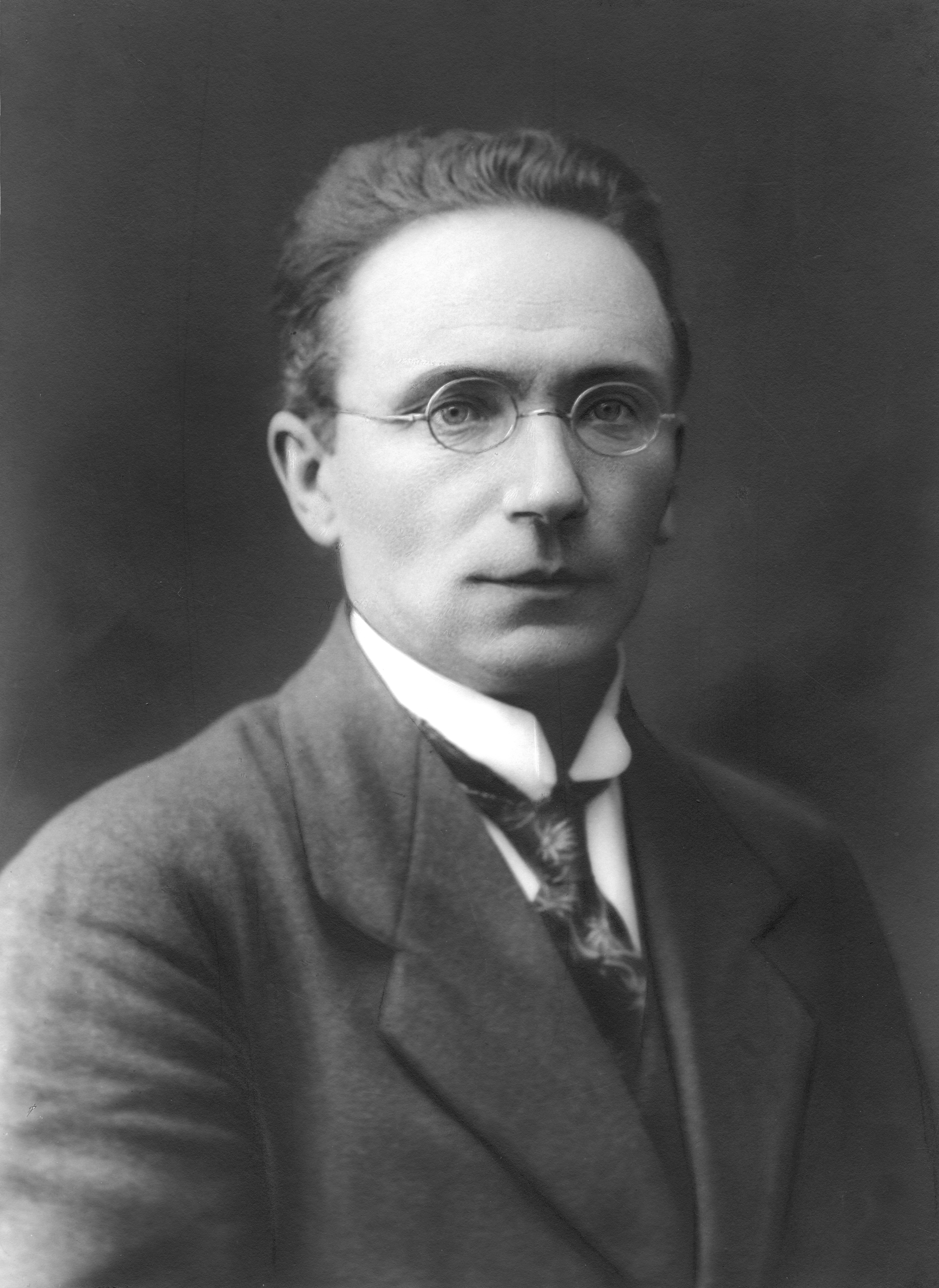
- Occupations: politician, educator

Juhan Leeman (born 1872), also known as Juhan Lehman, Johannes Leeman and Johannes Lehman, was an Estonian politician and educator.

Leeman was born on 12 December 1872 in Pajusi Parish (now Põltsamaa Parish), Kreis Fellin. According to the Estonian Biographical Database maintained by the Estonian Literary Museum, he was educated in Põltsamaa and subsequently attended a Teacher's Seminar. From 1891 to 1903, he taught at village schools, then worked as a telegraphist at Voldi railway station until 1904. He was arrested by the Russian authorities in 1907 in connection with the murder of Baron Otto von Budberg and was imprisoned in Siberia between 1910 and 1916. He was able to escape to Canada, and found his way to New York, before returning to Russia in 1917.

That year, the February Revolution in Russia led to the creation of a Provisional Government, which established the Autonomous Governorate of Estonia; Leeman sat in the Estonian Provincial Assembly, which governed it; he served from 26 November 1918 to the end of the session on 23 April 1919. He did not sit in the newly formed Republic of Estonia's Asutav Kogu (Constituent Assembly), but briefly sat in the first legislature of the new Riigikogu (Parliament) as a member of the Estonian Social Democratic Workers' Party, from 17 October 1922 (replacing Peeter Treiberg) to 1 November 1920; he was succeeded by Friido Kirs. Details of his subsequent career, and facts about his time and place of death are unknown.
