= Johan Jans =

Estonian politician (1880–1941)

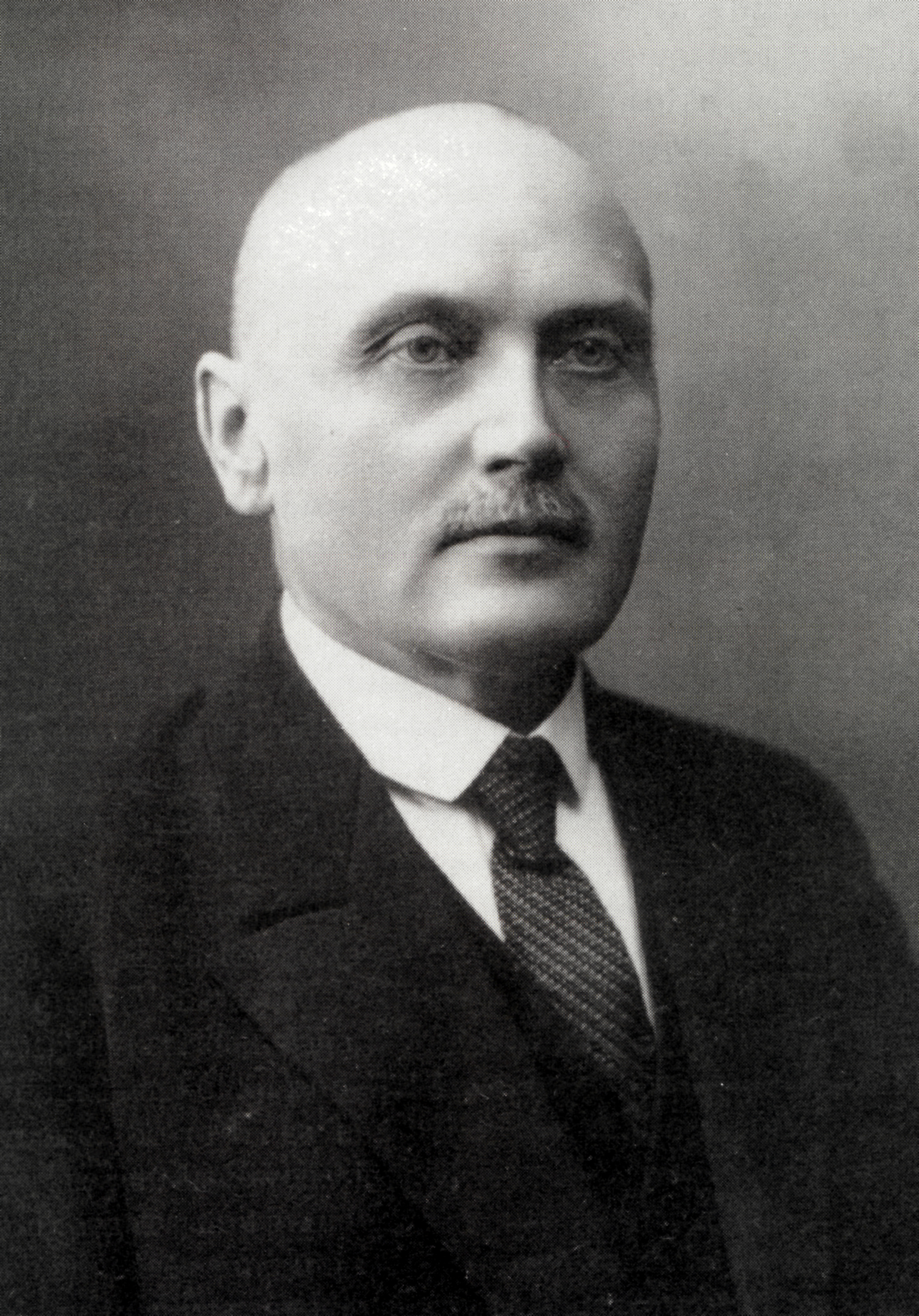
Johan Jans

Johan Jans (also Juhan Jans; 7 February 1880 – 21 December 1941) was an Estonian politician, born in Aakre Parish (now Elva Parish), Kreis Dorpat. He was a member of the Estonian Constituent Assembly. He died in Solikamsk, Russia.
