= Kael Koemets =

Estonian politician (1878–1948)

Kael Koemets (also Karp Koemets; 23 November 1878 Vana-Antsla Parish, Võru County – 8 January 1948 Meremäe Parish, Võru County) was an Estonian politician. He was a member of I Riigikogu.
