= Aleksander Prass =

Estonian politician (1891–1932)

Aleksander Prass (7 February 1891 Kohila Parish, Kreis Harrien – 17 October 1932 Tallinn) was an Estonian politician. He was a member of I Riigikogu. He was a member of the Riigikogu since 15 November 1921. He replaced Jüri Reinthal.
