= Estonian Socialist Revolutionary Party =

Estonian political party

Estonian Socialist Revolutionary Party Eesti sotsialistide-revolutsionääride partei
- Abbreviation: ESRP
- Founded: 1905
- Dissolved: 1919
- Merged into: EKP (left-wing); EISTP (right-wing)
- Ideology: Narodism
- Political position: Left-wing
- National affiliation: SR

The Estonian Socialist Revolutionary Party (Estonian: Eesti sotsialistide-revolutsionääride partei, ESRP) was a political party in Estonia during the early 20th century.

== History ==
The ESRP was founded in Estonia in 1905 as a branch of the Russian Socialist Revolutionary Party, and was formally established as an independent party during its 17–20 September 1917 congress. It won eight seats in the Estonian Provincial Assembly in the 1917 elections.

The party suffered from internal disagreements, with debates over whether Estonia should be an independent nation or remain part of Russia and over questions of nationality. In 1919 a final split saw left-wing members join the Communist Party, whilst right-wing members established the Estonian Independent Socialist Workers' Party together with defectors from the Estonian Social Democratic Workers' Party.

== Ideology ==
The party supported land nationalisation and the creation of agricultural co-operatives, as well as a decentralised state and popular control over the government. It was supported by intellectuals and industrial workers.
