= 1923 Estonian parliamentary election =

- 7 May 1923

100 seats in the Riigikogu 51 seats needed for a majority
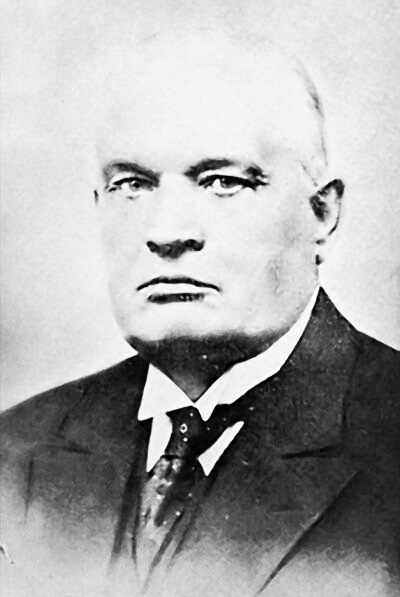

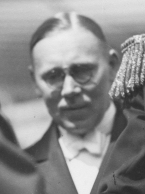

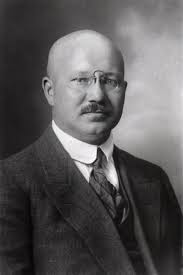
	First party	Second party	Third party
Leader	Konstantin Päts	August Rei	Otto Strandman
Party	Farmers' Assemblies	ESTP	Labour Party
Last election	21 seats	18 seats	22 seats
Seats won	23	15	12
Seat change	▲2	▼3	▼10
Popular vote	99,226	64,297	51,674
Percentage	21.6%	14.0%	11.2%
State Elder before election
Juhan Kukk
Labour Party
State Elder after election
Konstantin Päts
Farmers' Assemblies

Parliamentary elections were held in Estonia between 5 and 7 May 1923.

== Participating parties ==
A total of 163 lists were submitted for the elections, with the highest number of 22 in the Võru-Valga-Petseri district. Nationwide lists were submitted by the Workers' United Front (Communists), Social Democratic Workers Party, Labour Party, People's Party, National Liberals, Demobilized Soldiers, Christian People's Party, Farmers' Assemblies, and the German-Baltic Party. The same individuals could also run as candidates in different regions.

There were some controversies - some lists, most remarkably Communist, were declared void before the elections because of electoral law violations, and the results gave Estonia its most fragmented parliament.

== Results ==
Turnout percentage by municipality

Party	Votes	%	Seats	+/–
Farmers' Assemblies	99,226	21.57	23	+2
Estonian Social Democratic Workers' Party	64,297	13.98	15	–3
Estonian Labour Party	51,674	11.23	12	–10
Workers' United Front	43,711	9.50	10	+5
Estonian People's Party	34,646	7.53	8	–2
Christian Democratic Party	33,700	7.32	8	+1
Independent Socialist Workers' Party	21,704	4.72	5	–6
National Liberal Party	20,670	4.49	4	New
Russian parties	18,829	4.09	4	+3
Settlers' Party	17,266	3.75	4	New
German-Baltic Party	15,950	3.47	3	–1
Landlords' Party	9,967	2.17	2	New
Tenants' Union	6,130	1.33	1	New
Demobilised Soldiers' Union	5,670	1.23	1	New
Working People's Union	3,996	0.87	0	New
Swedish People's League	3,600	0.78	0	New
Smallholders of Saaremaa	2,496	0.54	0	New
Economic Group	2,214	0.48	0	–1
Seto-Ingrian Group	1,514	0.33	0	New
Smallholders, Settlers, Rural and Urban Workers	832	0.18	0	New
Seto Smallholders	639	0.14	0	New
Country People's Party (Võru, Valga and Petseri)	481	0.10	0	New
Settlers and State Leaseholders	475	0.10	0	New
Country People's Party	175	0.04	0	New
Party of Nationalists	175	0.04	0	New
Country People's Party (Tallinn)	48	0.01	0	New
Total	460,085	100.00	100	0
Valid votes	460,085	96.40		
Invalid/blank votes	17,199	3.60		
Total votes	477,284	100.00		
Registered voters/turnout	702,542	67.94		
Source: Nohlen & Stöver

=== By constituency ===
Constituency	Farmers	SocDem Workers	Labour	Communists (Note: The Workers' United Front was a front for the Communist Party, which had used umbrella organisations to participate in politics since being banned in 1918.)	People's	Christian	Independent Socialist	National Liberal	Russian	Settlers	German-Baltic	Landlords	Tenants	Demobilised Soldiers	Others
Constituency	%	%	%	%	%	%	%	%	%	%	%	%	%	%	%
(1) Tallinn	7.5	9.1	9.2	—	3.2	11.0	7.9	14.0	3.0	—	10.6	7.9	11.0	—	5.7
(2) Harju County	27.9	5.0	13.6	13.4	2.1	13.9	1.7	6.8	0.5	7.9	1.8	0.8	—	0.5	4.1
(3) Lääne County	28.8	10.3	24.9	6.2	1.7	13.5	—	2.2	0.3	—	2.1	—	0.4	0.8	8.9
(4) Pärnu County	28.8	8.8	15.6	24.5	5.0	4.2	—	2.6	0.4	—	3.5	2.5	—	2.1	1.9
(5) Saare County	18.2	40.0	9.1	4.9	1.0	8.5	—	1.4	0.2	—	2.4	0.7	—	1.2	12.3
(6) Järva County	34.6	14.4	13.3	6.6	5.0	7.8	5.6	5.2	—	—	2.5	1.4	—	1.4	2.2
(7) Tartu County	14.1	14.5	3.4	14.9	19.7	5.0	5.1	1.8	5.1	7.3	4.2	2.7	—	1.8	0.4
(8) Viru County	20.0	7.0	11.4	—	4.8	8.7	7.3	5.8	10.5	14.9	2.2	1.7	1.1	1.6	3.0
(9) Viljandi County	29.6	19.1	14.7	10.0	5.7	4.4	9.5	2.8	0.3	—	1.9	1.4	—	—	0.6
(10) Võru, Valga and Petseri County	22.2	19.4	9.7	10.1	10.1	3.1	5.5	2.6	9.1	—	1.9	0.7	—	1.9	3.7
Total	21.57	13.98	11.23	9.50	7.53	7.32	4.72	4.49	4.09	3.75	3.47	2.17	1.33	1.23	3.62

== See also ==
- II Riigikogu
