= Jaan Järve =

Estonian politician (1894–1945)

Jaan Järve (7 October 1894 Puhja, Kreis Dorpat – 13 February 1945 Freudenstadt, Germany) was an Estonian politician. He was a member of I Riigikogu.

In 1921, Järve was the Second Assistant Chairmen of I Riigikogu. In 1944, he fled to Germany during the Second World War; he was killed in an air raid in February 1945 aged 50.
