= Wiek County =

Uyezd in Estonia Governorate, Russian Empire

Coordinates: 59°00′N 24°00′E

Wiek County Гапсальскій уѣздъ
- Uezd
- Location in the Governorate of Estonia
- Country: Russian Empire
- Governorate: Estonia
- Established: 1745
- Abolished: 1920
- Capital: Hapsal

Area
  - Total: 4,697.92 km^{2} (1,813.88 sq mi)

Population (1897)
  - Total: 82,077
  - Density: 17.471/km^{2} (45.249/sq mi)

Wiek County (German: Kreis Wiek or Kreis Hapsal, Estonian: Lääne kreis, Russian: Гапсальскій/Викскій уѣздъ, romanized: Gapsalskiy/Vikskiy uyezd) was one of the four counties of the Russian Empire located in the Governorate of Estonia. It was situated in the western part of the governorate (in the northwestern part of present-day Estonia). Its capital was Haapsalu (Hapsal). The territory of Wiek County corresponds to present-day Lääne and Hiiu counties, the westernmost part of Rapla County, and a small part of Pärnu County.

== Demographics ==
At the time of the Russian Empire Census of 1897, Wiek County had a population of 82,077. Of these, 92.2% spoke Estonian, 5.6% Swedish, 1.2% German, 0.6% Russian, 0.2% Ukrainian, and 0.1% Latvian as their native language.
