= Estonian Independent Socialist Workers' Party =

Defunct political party in Estonia

Estonian Independent Socialist Workers' Party Eesti Iseseisev Sotsialistlik Tööliste Partei
- Founder: Hans Kruus
- Founded: 1919
- Dissolved: 1924
- Split from: Estonian Socialist Revolutionary Party
- Succeeded by: Estonian Socialist Workers' Party
- Colours: Red

The Estonian Independent Socialist Workers' Party (Estonian: Eesti Iseseisev Sotsialistlik Tööliste Partei, EISTP) was a political party in Estonia.

== History ==
The party was formed in 1919 as a split from the Estonian Socialist Revolutionary Party, and was joined by defectors from the Estonian Social Democratic Workers' Party. It contested the Constituent Assembly elections in 1919 as Socialists-Revolutionaries, winning seven seats. Later in the year they became the EISTP.

The 1920 elections saw the EISTP win 11 of the 100 seats in the Riigikogu. In 1922 the party was infiltrated by members of the Communist Party, resulting in a power struggle that the Communists won by mid-1923. The right-wing opposition left the party in 1922 and formed the Independent Socialist Workers' Party (ISTP). The May 1923 elections saw the radicalised party reduced to five seats.

The EISTP was renamed the "Working People's Party" (Eestimaa töörahva partei) and became a front for the banned Communists. In May 1924 the party was banned, and in 1925 the right-wing splinter party ISTP merged with the Estonian Social Democratic Workers' Party to form the Estonian Socialist Workers' Party.
