= 1st Riigikogu =

Parliament of Estonia 1920–1923

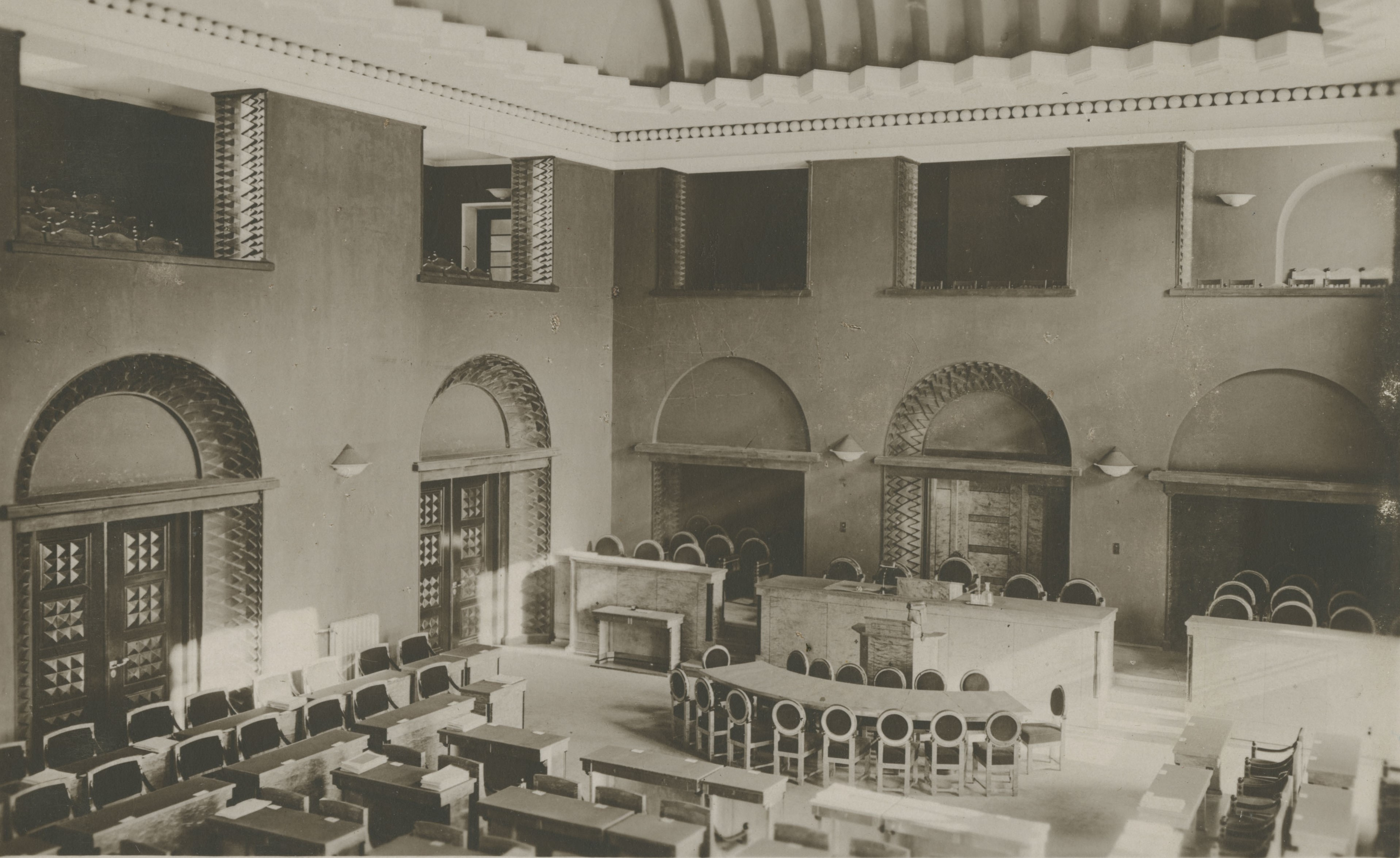
The Riigikogu session hall in the 1920s

The 1st Riigikogu was the first legislature of the Estonian Parliament (Riigikogu). The legislature was elected after 1920 elections (held on 27–29 November 1920). It sat between 20 December 1920 and 30 May 1923, before the next round of elections were held.

== Parties and seats ==
The 1920 general election distributed the 100 seats as follows:

Party	Seats	+/–
Estonian Labour Party (ETE)	22	–8
Farmers' Assemblies (PK)	21	+13
Estonian Social Democratic Workers' Party (ESDTP)	18	–23
Estonian Independent Socialist Workers' Party (EISTP)	11	+4
Estonian People's Party (ER)	10	–15
Christian Democratic Party (KRE)	7	+2
Central Committee of Tallinn Trade Unions (TAK)	5	New
German-Baltic Party (SBE)	4	+1
Russian National Union (VEE)	1	0
Economic Group (MR)	1	New
Total	100	–20
Source: Nohlen and Stöver

== Officials ==
Chairmen:

- Otto Strandman (4 January 1921 to 18 November 1921)
- Johann Kukk (18 November 1921 to 20 November 1922)
- Konstantin Päts (from 20 November 1922)

First Assistant Chairman:

- Karl Virma (from 4 January 1921)

Second Assistant Chairmen:

- Jaan Järve (4 January 1921 to 4 March 1921)
- August Kerem (from 4 March 1921)

Secretaries:

- Artur Tupits (4 January 1921 to 20 November 1922)
- Tõnis Kalbus (from 20 November 1922)

First Assistant Secretary

- Jaan-Johann Bergmann (from 4 January 1921)

Second Assistant Secretary

- Walter von Pezold (from 4 January 1921)
