= Friido Kirs =

Estonian politician (1889–1948)

Friido Kirs (also Friidu Kirs; 13 February 1889 – 16 April 1948) was an Estonian schoolteacher and politician. He was a member of I Riigikogu, representing the Estonian Labour Party. He was a member of the Riigikogu since 15 October 1921. He replaced Aleksander Kaar. On 2 November 1922, he resigned his position and he was replaced by Timotheus Grünthal.

Friido Kirs was born in the village of in Pihtla on the island of Saaremaa into a family of farmers. After graduating from secondary school, he was employed as a sailor. From 1908 until 1910, he worked as a schoolteacher. In 1910, he was conscripted into the 87th Neschlot Infantry Regiment of the Imperial Russian Army in Novgorod Governorate. He served as a volunteer on Russian ships during World War I and became a prisoner of war of the Germans. After his release, he returned to Saaremaa and was elected Mayor of Pihtla Parish in 1919 and later worked as a primary school teacher in Sandla and Ilpla, becoming the latter school's headmaster until 1927.

In 1920, Kirs Became an alternate member of the 1st Riigikogu, representing the Estonian Labour Party. From 1928 until 1941, he was the headmaster of Rahuste Primary School, then taught for a year at Tõlluste Primary School as a head teacher. In 1942, he was appointed the acting head teacher of Ilpla Primary School and continued to work a small farmer.

In 1919, he married Elisabeth Jalakas. The couple had three children. He died in 1948 in Kuressaare, aged 59.
