= Laheküla =

Laheküla may refer to several places in Estonia:

- Laheküla, Hiiu County, village in Hiiumaa Parish, Hiiu County
- Laheküla, Saaremaa Parish, village in Saaremaa Parish, Saare County
- Laheküla, Muhu Parish, village in Muhu Parish, Saare County
- Allikalahe, village in Saaremaa Parish, Saare County, known as Laheküla until 2017 when located in Laimjala Parish
- Tirbi, village in Saaremaa Parish, Saare County, known as Laheküla until 2017 when located in Pihtla Parish
- Laheküla, Orissaare Parish, former village in Orissaare Parish, Saare County, now part of Maasi village
