= Pühamets Nature Reserve =

Protected area in Estonia

- Location within Estonia
- Location: Estonia
- Coordinates: 58°21′40″N 22°41′20″E
- Area: 57 ha (140 acres)
- Established: 2007

Pühamets Nature Reserve (Estonian: Pühametsa looduskaitseala) is a nature reserve located in Saare County, Estonia.

The nature reserve spanning 57 ha was founded in 2007 to protect valuable habitat types and threatened species in Kõljala and Masa villages (both in former Pihtla Parish).
