= Estonian Methodist Church =

Christian organization based in Estonia

- Classification: Protestant
- Orientation: Methodism
- Polity: Connexional (modified episcopal polity)
- Bishop: Robert Tšerenkov
- Superintendent: Vacant
- Associations: World Methodist Council, World Council of Churches, Conference of European Churches, Community of Protestant Churches in Europe
- Region: Estonia
- Founder: Vassili Täht, Karl Kuum
- Origin: 9 June 1907; Kuressaare, Saaremaa
- Congregations: 26
- Members: 1,642 (2012)
- Official website: metodistikirik.ee

Estonian Methodist Church (formerly also United Methodist Church in Estonia; Estonian: Eesti Metodisti Kirik) is a Methodist church organisation in Estonia. It is a member of the World Methodist Council. Until 1 July 2023, when it severed its ties to the United Methodist Church, it belonged to the Northern Europe and Eurasia Central Conference of the United Methodist Church and to the United Methodist Church Nordic and Baltic Episcopal Area.

Currently it has 26 congregations. It operates a theological seminary in Tallinn and a number of other ministries. Its official publication is the magazine Koduteel.

According to the 2011 census there were 1,098 Methodists in Estonia. According to the statistics from the Estonian Council of Churches, based on the numbers submitted by the member churches, there were 1,642 Methodists in 2012, served by 33 pastors and 1 deacon.

== History ==
=== First decades (1907–1940) ===
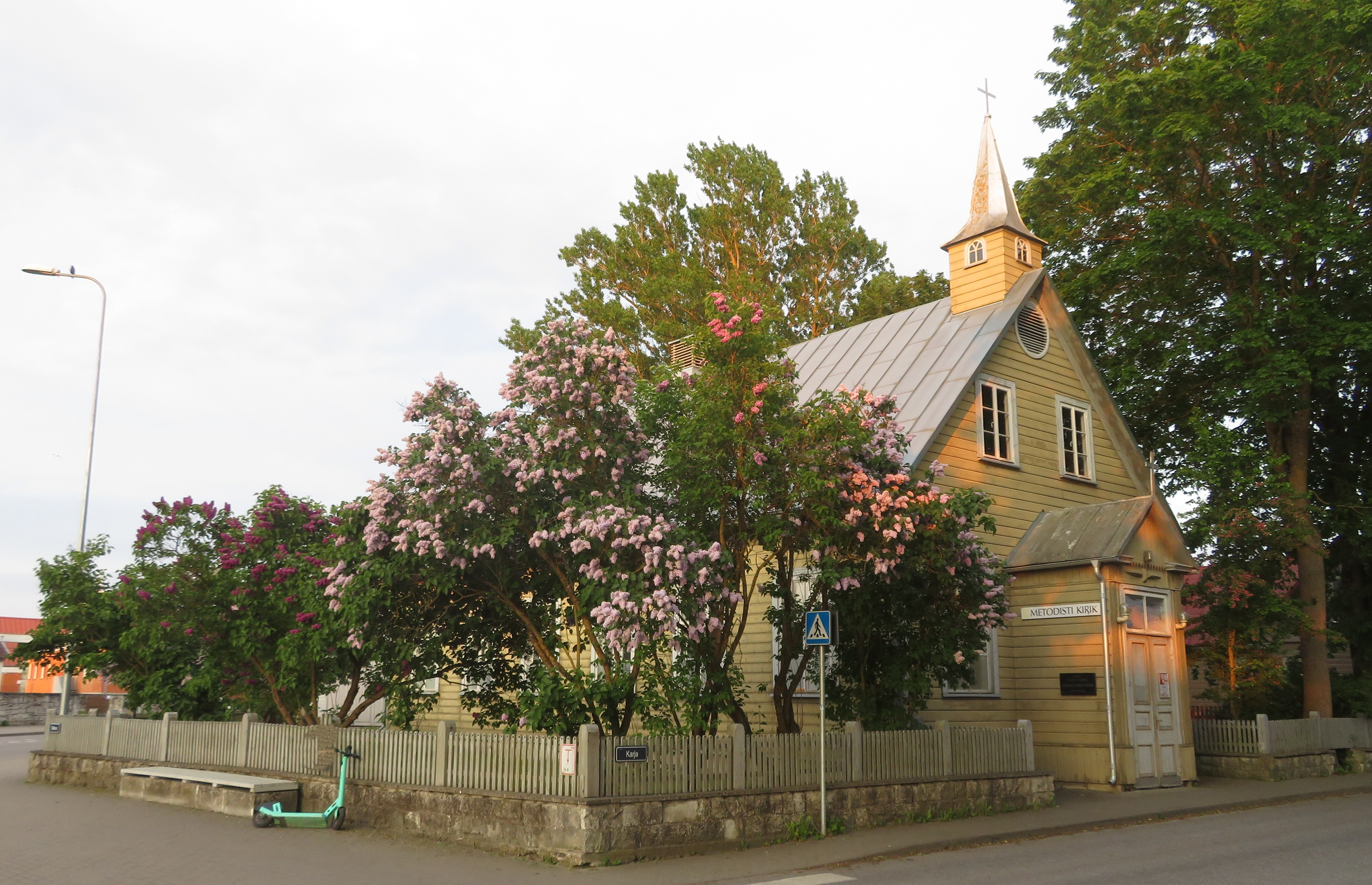
The oldest Estonian Methodist Church in Kuressaare

Methodist ministry in Estonia commenced in the first decade of the 20th century. In 1907, George A. Simons, an American of German descent, was named the superintendent of Finland and Russia with a seat in Saint Petersburg by bishop William Burt in Zürich. Estonia became part of Simmons' missionary area because it was part of the Russian Empire. The first missionary in Estonia was Vassili Täht, a colporteur of the British and Foreign Bible Society in Saint Petersburg. On 9 June 1907 Vassili met his friend Karl Kuum, a brother in the Moravian Church, on the island of Saaremaa. They started to proclaim the Gospel together. This date is considered the beginning of the activities of the Methodist Church in Estonia. The first Methodist service in Estonia was held in merchant Mihkel Trey's home in Kuressaare, Saaremaa. The congregation of Kuressaare, the first one in Estonia, was officially established on 26 August 1910 when three men and two women were accepted into communion. On 28 October 1912 the first Methodist church building in Estonia was consecrated in Kuressaare.

The evangelisation outside the town of Kuressaare was carried out by Martin Prikask. In July 1910 the first branch of the Kuressaare congregation was established in the village of Reeküla, the next one in September 1910 in the village of Rahniku. From the island of Saaremaa the Methodist mission spread to the mainland where the first congregation was established by Karl Kuum in July 1912 in Tapa.

The wider spread of Methodism to various areas of Estonia began in 1918, approximately at the same time with Estonia gaining its independence. The first Methodist congregation in the capital, Tallinn, was established on 3 March 1922. By 1 January 1940 the Methodist Church in Estonia constituted of 1,836 members in 14 congregations (Tallinn I and Tallinn II, Haapsalu, Tapa, Rakvere, Paide, Tartu, Viljandi, Pärnu, Narva, Avanduse, Kuressaare, Targu, and Paide). From 1920 to 1940 Methodists published a monthly magazine Kristlik Kaitsja and had their own publishing house of the same name. From 1935 to 1940 a second magazine, Koduteel, was published by congregations on the island of Saaremaa. Clergy was educated abroad, mostly in Germany. The church sent out its own missionaries among whom the most notable was Johannes Karlson, a missionary in South America.

As Methodism had spread in Estonia as part of the Russian mission of the Methodist Episcopal Church (MEC), the local congregations continued to be affiliated with this oldest and largest Methodist denomination in the United States. They remained for over a decade part of the Russian missionary district of the MEC. The first attempt to form a separate church district for Estonia took place in 1921 when the first annual Methodist conference in Estonia took place and Martin Prikask was appointed the first local superintendent, however, the position was abolished a year later. The district was restored in 1928 with Prikask becoming again superintendent. After the changes in the Estonian law of religion the local Methodist organisation was registered in 1935 as an independent church under the name of Methodist Episcopal Church in Estonia (Estonian: Eesti Piiskoplik Metodisti Kirik). The Methodist Church was given similar privileges to the Estonian Evangelical Lutheran Church and the Estonian Apostolic Orthodox Church. As according to the new law all churches had to be governed locally, superintendent Prikask was elected an acting bishop but was never consecrated as one, so the spiritual episcopal authority continued to be exercised by bishop Raymond J. Wade in Stockholm, Sweden.

=== Under occupations (1940–1991) ===
A few months before the Soviet occupation, on 25 February 1940 the General Meeting of the Methodist Episcopal Church in Estonia adopted new statutes and a new name, Estonian Methodist Church (Estonian: Eesti Metodisti Kirik). In the first year of the Soviet occupation (1940–1941) several church members were repressed. Four Methodist pastors, including superintendent Martin Prikask, were arrested, deported and later executed.

After a relative easing of restrictions on religious organisations during the German occupation (1941–1944), religious life in Estonia, following the Soviet re-occupation of the Baltic states (1944) became again subject to Soviet persecutions of religion. In the Stalinist era there were unsuccessful attempts to liquidate the Estonian Methodist Church and to make the members join the Estonian Evangelical Lutheran Church. Many congregations lost their buildings – in Tallinn one of the Methodist churches had been destroyed in a Soviet air raid in 1944 and the second church was taken over by the Soviet Army in 1950. The Methodist congregation in Tallinn had to move to a little church of the Seventh-day Adventists they continued to share until 2000. Some members of the Methodist clergy were further repressed, e.g. pastor of the Tallinn congregation Aleksander Kuum was arrested and deported in 1952.

Nevertheless, the Church retained its legal status as a religious organization during the Soviet years as the only legal Methodist body in USSR. Religious life in Estonia started to normalise after Joseph Stalin's death in 1953. In 1960s contacts with Methodist organisations abroad became possible again. In 1961 the first episcopal visit after World War II took place when Norwegian bishop Odd Arthur Hagen visited Tallinn. In 1968 when the United Methodist Church was founded, superintendent Aleksander Kuum from Estonia was able to take part in the founding conference in Dallas, Texas. The Methodist Church in Estonia was part of the Northern Europe Central Conference of the United Methodist Church. In 1971 Aleksander Kuum became also a member of the World Methodist Council Executive Committee. From 1972 onwards the visits of Northern European bishops to Estonia became regular events, taking place once or twice a year.

=== After regaining independence (1991–) ===
Three years after Estonia regained freedom from the Soviet regime, the United Methodist Church founded the Baltic Methodist Theological Seminary for the purpose of training leaders for evangelism. The first class began with 54 students in August 1994. The seminary is now accredited as an institution of higher education in Estonia offering both one-year diploma certificate and a three-year degree programme in theology.

On 1 January 2007 the United Methodist Church in Estonia had 24 congregations and 4 ministry points with a total membership of 1,731.

In 2022, the Estonian church started the process of separating from the United Methodist Church, after 96% of the delegates at its annual conference supported this decision. The main reason for this was the growing trend among the UMC bishops to ignore the church teachings on homosexuality and same-sex marriages that was not acceptable to the Estonian Methodist congregations. In March 2023, the Northern Europe and Eurasia Central Conference of the United Methodist Church accepted changes into the church order that makes it possible for the Estonian church to leave the UMC with its real estate and other property. The decision was confirmed on 16 June 2023 at the Baltic Annual Conference of the United Methodist Church, with 23 congregations voting in favour. The ties were formally severed on 1 July 2023.

== Church government ==
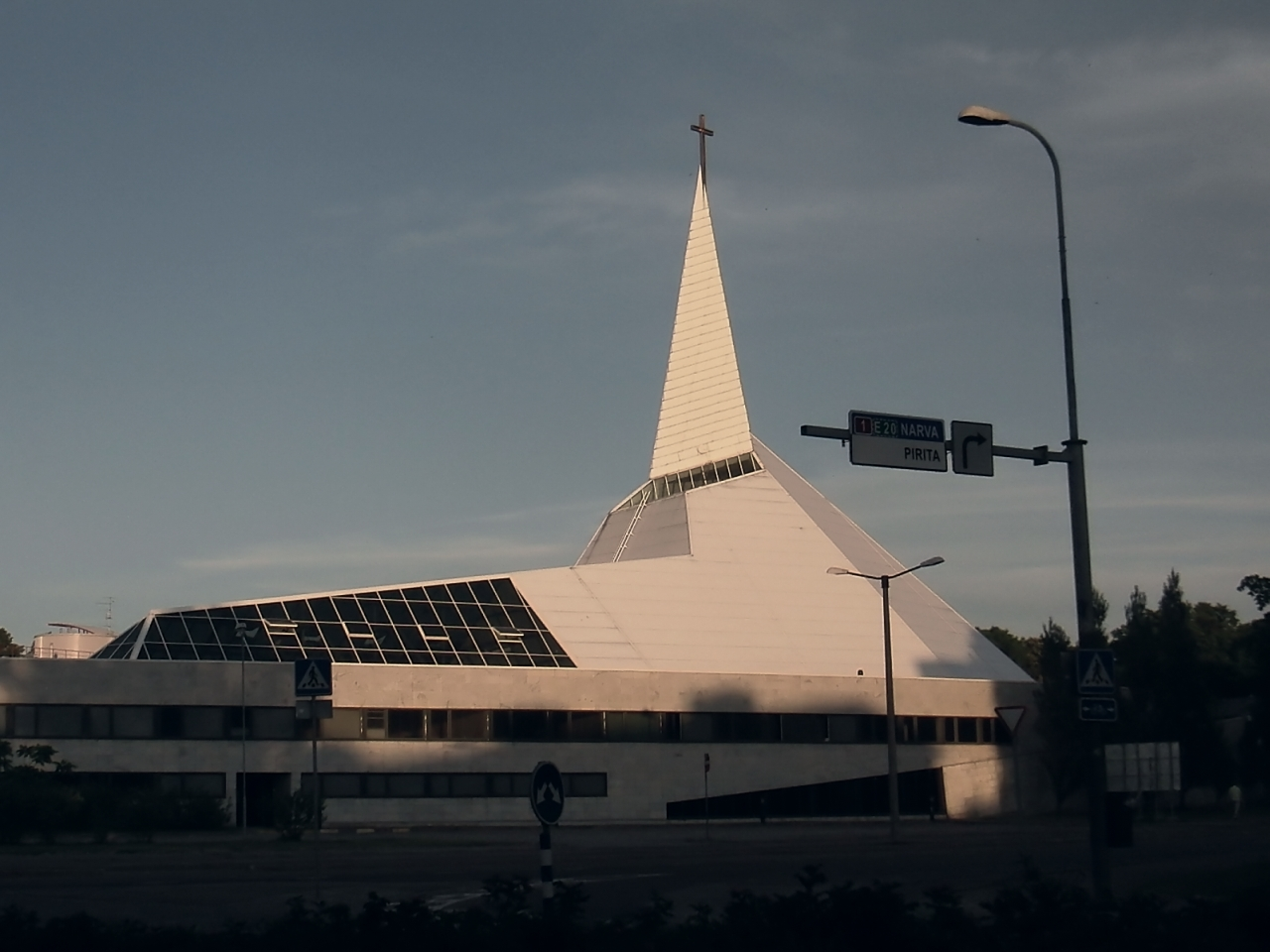
Tallinn Methodist Church (built 1994–2000)

=== Bishops ===
Since 1907 Estonian Methodists have operated under the spiritual rule of the following bishops:

- 1907–1912 William Burt
- 1912–1924 John Louis Nuelsen
- 1924–1925 Anton Bast
- 1925–1926 Ernest Gladstone Richardson
- 1926–1927 John Louis Nuelsen
- 1927–1928 Edgar Blake
- 1928–1946 Raymond J. Wade
- 1946–1953 Theodor Arvidson
- 1953–1970 Odd Arthur Hagen
- 1970–1989 Ole Edvard Borgen
- 1989–2001 Hans Växby
- 2001–2009 Øystein Olsen
- 2009–2023 Christian Alsted
- 2026- Robert Tšerenkov

=== Superintendents ===
Since 1907 the Methodist Church in Estonia has been governed by the following superintendents:

- 1907–1921 George A. Simons
- 1921–1922 Martin Prikask
- 1922–1928 George A. Simons
- 1928 Otto Liebner
- 1928–1941 Martin Prikask
- 1941–1956 Martin Kuigre
- 1956–1962 Valdo Ojassoo
- 1962–1974 Aleksander Kuum
- 1974–1978 Hugo Oengo
- 1978–1979 Aleksander Kuum
- 1979–2005 Olav Pärnamets
- 2005–2018 Taavi Hollman
- 2018–2026 Robert Tšerenkov

== Congregations ==
The United Methodist Church in Estonia has altogether 26 congregations located in 10 different counties:

- Harju County: Keila, Paldiski, Tallinn Estonian, Tallinn New Beginning, Tallinn Russian
- Ida-Viru County: Jõhvi, Jõhvi Bethlehem, Kohtla-Järve Calvary, Narva, Sillamäe
- Järva County: Paide
- Lääne County: Haapsalu
- Lääne-Viru County: Aseri, Kunda Bethany, Rakvere, Sakussaare, Tapa
- Põlva County: Kärsa, Räpina
- Pärnu County: Pärnu Agape
- Saare County: Kuressaare, Reeküla
- Tartu County: Tartu St Luke's
- Võru County: Ruusmäe, Viitka, Võru Tree of Life
