= Kaali Landscape Conservation Area =

Protected area in Estonia

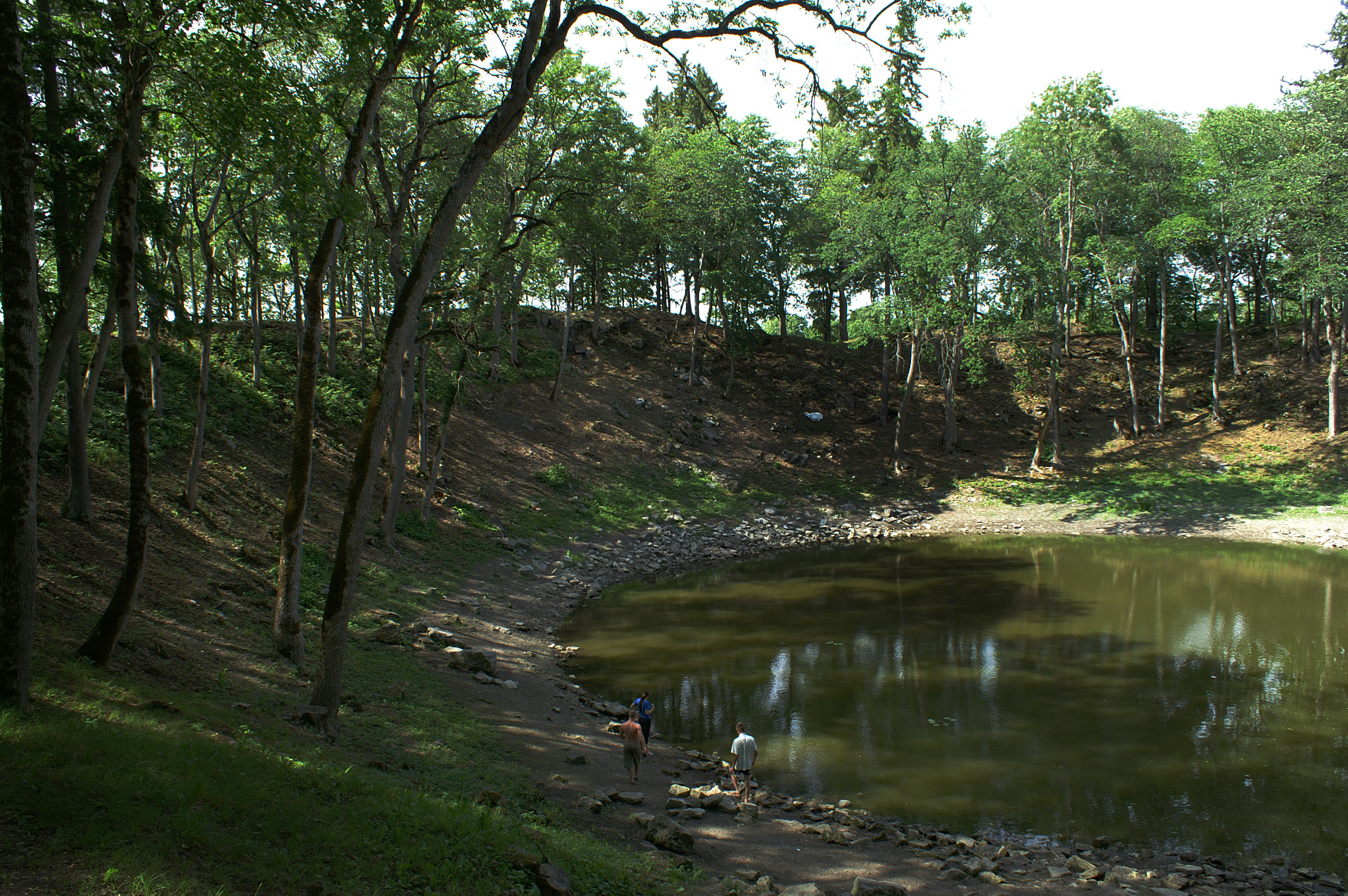

- Location within Estonia
- Location: Estonia
- Coordinates: 58°22′10″N 22°40′10″E
- Area: 39 ha (96 acres)
- Established: 1938 (2017)

Kaali Landscape Conservation Area is a nature park situated in Saare County, Estonia.

Its area is 39 ha.

The protected area was designated in 1938 to protect Kaali crater and its surrounding areas. In 1959, the re-designation took place. In 2000, the borders were widened.
