= Sutu =

Sutu may refer to:

- Sutu, Estonia
- Sutu, Iran
- Şutu, Romania
- Sutu, pseudonym of Stu Campbell, Australian comic book artist
- Soutzos family, a Greek family
- Shutu or Sutu, the name given in ancient Akkadian language sources to certain nomadic groups of the Trans-Jordanian highlands
