= Leina =

Leina may refer to:

- Leina, Pärnu County, a village in Tahkuranna Parish, Pärnu County, Estonia
- Leina, Saare County, a village in Pihtla Parish, Saare County, Estonia
- Leina (river), a river of Thuringia, Germany, tributary of the Leina
