= Haeska =

Haeska may refer to several places in Estonia:

- Haeska, Lääne County, village in Haapsalu, Lääne County
- Haeska, Saare County, village in Saaremaa Parish, Saare County
