= Reo =

Reo or REO may refer to:

== People with the name ==
- Reo Fortune (1903–1979), New Zealand social anthropologist
- Reo Griffiths (born 2000), English footballer
- Reo Hatate (旗手 怜央, born 1997), Japanese footballer
- Reo Kurachi (倉知 玲鳳; born 1997), Japanese voice actress and keyboardist
- Reo Kurosawa (黒沢 怜生; born 1992), Japanese professional shogi player
- Reo Mochizuki (望月 嶺臣; born 1995), Japanese footballer
- Reo Nishida (西田 玲雄, born 2000), Japanese diver
- Reo Nishiguchi (西口 黎央, born 1997), Japanese footballer
- Reo Okabe (岡部 怜央, 1999), Japanese professional shogi player
- Reo Sano (佐野 玲於, born 1996), Japanese dancer and actor
- Reo Stakis (1913–2001), Scottish hotel magnate, founder of Stakis Hotels
- Reo Takeshita (竹下 玲王, born 1995), Japanese footballer
- Reo Yasunaga (安永 玲央; born 2000), Japanese footballer
- Don Reo (born 1946), American television writer and producer

== Places ==
- Réo, a town in Burkina Faso
- Reo, Estonia, village
- Reo, Indiana, United States, an unincorporated community

== Other uses ==
- Rare-earth oxide, alternative name for rare-earth element
- Real estate owned, a class of property
- Registration and Electoral Office (Hong Kong)
- REO, FAA identifier for Rome State Airport in Rome, Oregon
- R.E.O. (album), a 1976 album by REO Speedwagon
  - Sometimes used an abbreviation of REO Speedwagon's full name
- Reo (deity), Lusitanian god
- Reo (spider), a spider genus of family Mimetidae
- Reo Coordination Language, a computer programming language
- REO Motor Car Company (1905–1975), a former American car and truck manufacturer, founded by Ransom E. Olds
- Rio (disambiguation)
- Ríos (disambiguation)
