= Aleksander Kaar =

Estonian politician

Aleksander Kaar (6 May 1892 – 5 April 1943) was an Estonian politician. He was born in Lümanda Parish (now Saaremaa Parish), Kreis Ösel, and was a member of I Riigikogu, representing the Estonian Labour Party. On 15 October 1921, he resigned his position and he was replaced by Friido Kirs. He died in Tavda, Sverdlovsk Oblast, Russian SFSR.
