= Salavere =

Village in Estonia

Coordinates: 58°22′N 22°39′E

- Village
- Interactive map of Salavere
- Country: Estonia
- County: Saare County
- Parish: Saaremaa Parish
- Time zone: UTC+2 (EET)
  - Summer (DST): UTC+3 (EEST)

Salavere is a village in Saaremaa Parish, Saare County in western Estonia.

Before the administrative reform in 2017, the village was in Pihtla Parish. During the reform, the village of Sepa was merged into the village of Salavere. Between 1977 and 1997, Sepa was also part of Salavere, but from 1997 to 2017 it was a standalone village.
