= Ennu =

Village in Estonia

Coordinates: 58°13′46″N 22°40′39″E

- Village
- Interactive map of Ennu
- Country: Estonia
- County: Saare County
- Parish: Saaremaa Parish
- Time zone: UTC+2 (EET)
  - Summer (DST): UTC+3 (EEST)

Ennu is a village in Saaremaa Parish, Saare County in western Estonia.

== Name ==
Ennu was attested in historical sources as Enno Töns and Enno Niggo in 1811 (both names referring to villagers living there), and as Энну (Ennu) c. 1900. The name of the village is derived from the personal name Enn (genitive: Ennu) 'Henry'.

== History ==
From 1977 to 1997, together with the neighboring Suure-Rootsi and Väike-Rootsi, Ennu was included in the village of Vätta. After 1997, the name Vätta continued to apply to the area and to the Vätta Peninsula.

Before the administrative reform in 2017, the village was in Pihtla Parish.
