= Karl Nikolai von Nolcken =

Baltic German clergyman and writer

- Born: 2 February 1830; Köljal, Ösel, Governorate of Livonia, Russian Empire
- Died: 22 January 1913 (aged 82); Arensburg, Ösel, Governorate of Livonia, Russian Empire
- Occupations: Pastor, translator, linguist and folklorist

Karl Nikolai von Nolcken (2 February 1830 in Köljal, Ösel – 22 January 1913 in Arensburg, Ösel) was a Baltic German pastor, translator, linguist and folklorist.

== Biography ==
Nolcken, a son of landowner Alexander von Nolcken, studied history at the University of Dorpat and was first employed as a secretary at the district court and notary of the Ritterschaftskanzlei (Knighthood firm) in Arensburg (Kuressaare). He then studied Theology at Dorpat from 1860 to 1864. From 1867 until his Emeritus in 1901 he was a pastor in Pöide Parish in Ösel.

== Published works ==
Nolcken published poetry and theological treatises as well as two children's books in Estonian, including Aabitsaraamat.

== Literature ==
- Carola L. Gottzmann, Petra Hörner: Lexikon der deutschsprachigen Literatur des Baltikums und St. Petersburgs. de Gruyter, Berlin 2007, S. 973.
