= Kailuka =

Village in Estonia

Coordinates: 58°15′N 22°43′E

- Village
- Interactive map of Kailuka
- Country: Estonia
- County: Saare County
- Parish: Saaremaa Parish

Population (1 January 2014)
  - Total: 69
- Time zone: UTC+2 (EET)
  - Summer (DST): UTC+3 (EEST)

Kailuka is a village in Saaremaa Parish, Saare County, on the island of Saaremaa, Estonia. In 2011 there were 64 inhabitants, including 34 men and 30 women, of whom 62 were Estonians. In 2000, the population was 75, including 35 men and 40 women. There were 74 permanent residents. Of these, 73 were Estonians.

Before the administrative reform in 2017, the village was in Pihtla Parish.
