= Kaali, Estonia =

Village in Estonia

Coordinates: 58°22′19″N 22°40′10″E

Kaali
- Village
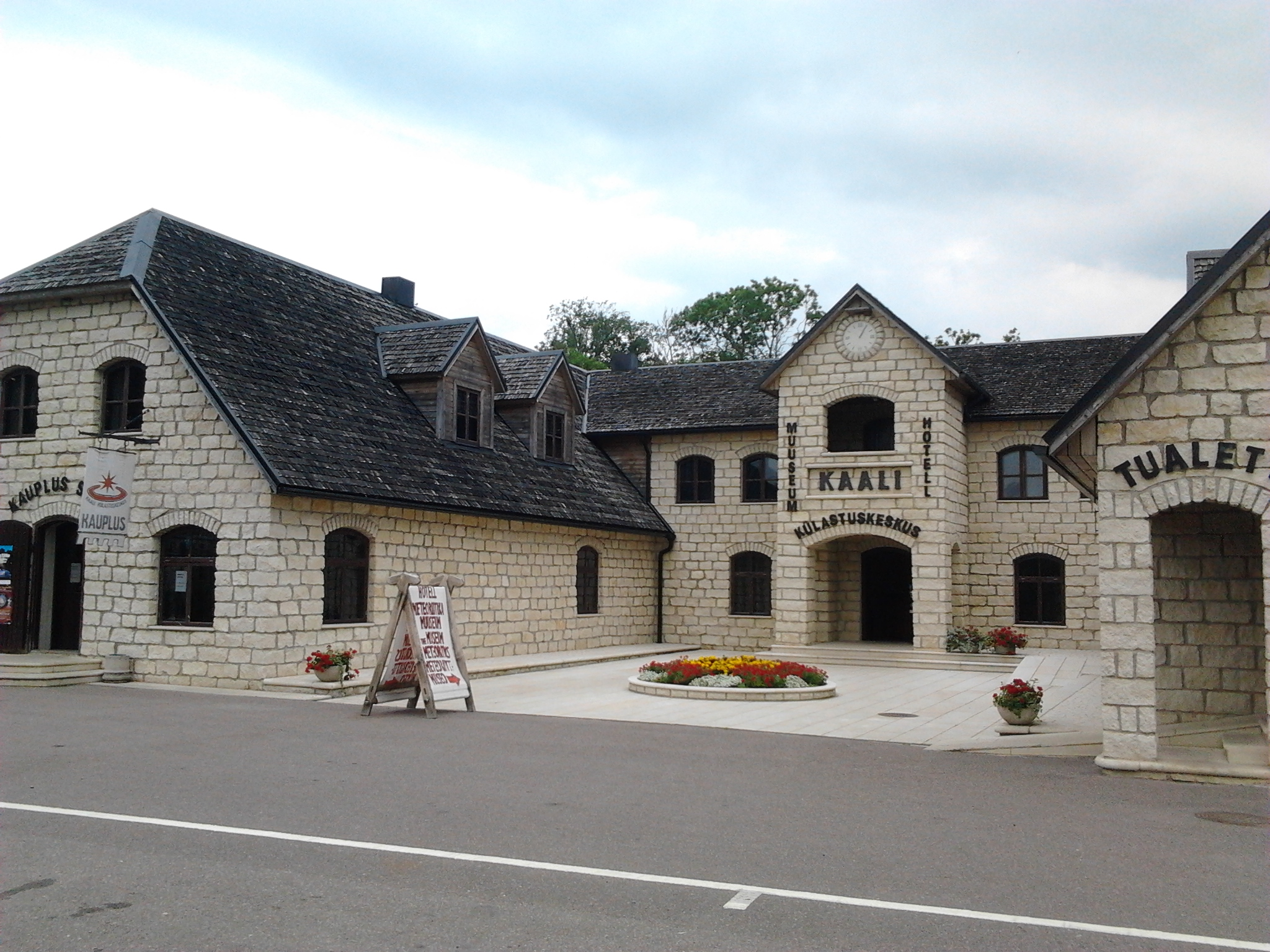
- Kaali visitor centre, hotel, and meteorite museum
- Interactive map of Kaali
- Country: Estonia
- County: Saare County
- Parish: Saaremaa Parish
- Time zone: UTC+2 (EET)
  - Summer (DST): UTC+3 (EEST)

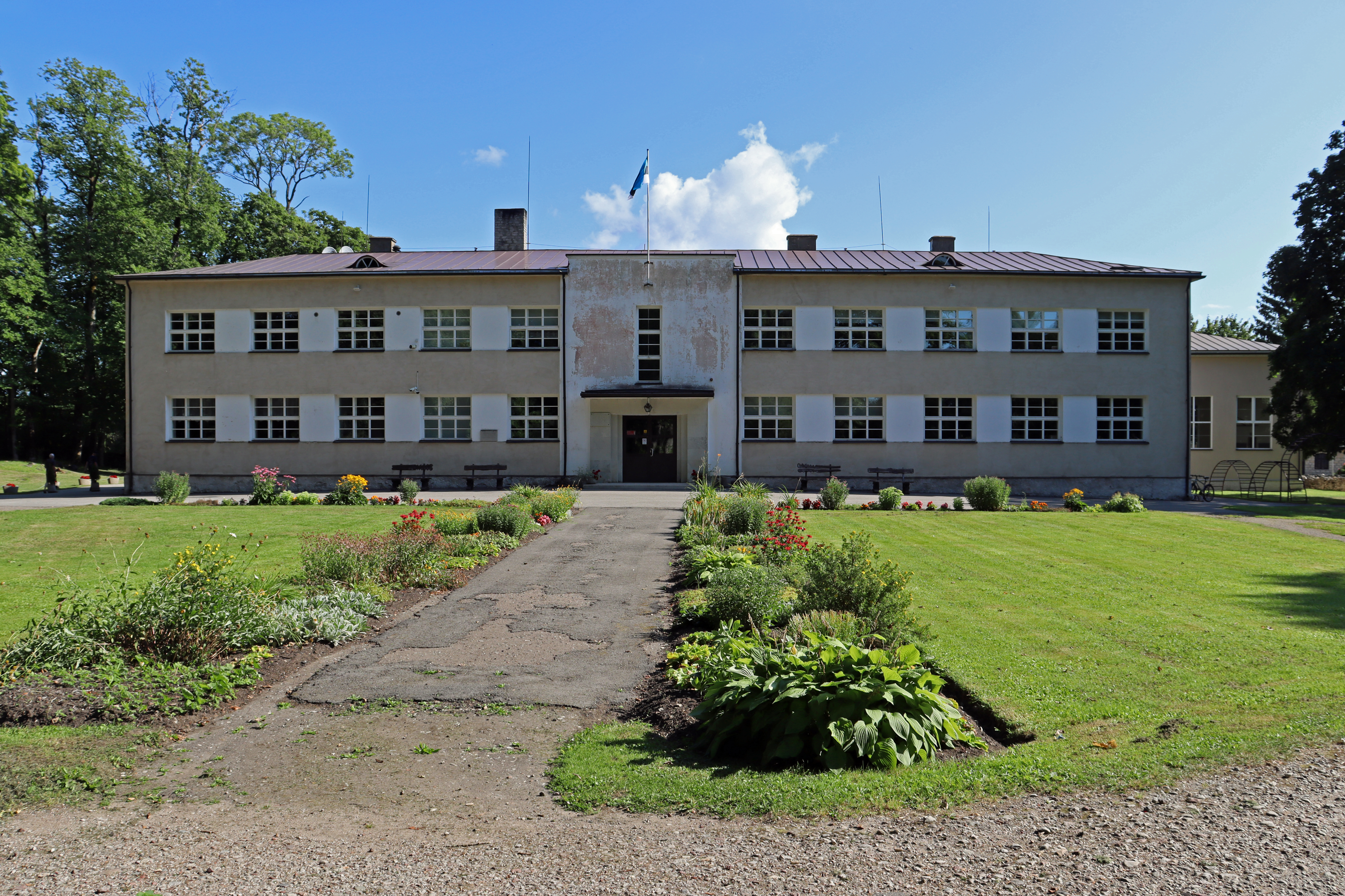
The village school at Kaali.

Kaali is a village in Saaremaa Parish, Saare County in western Estonia, 18 kilometres (11 mi) from Kuressaare, the island capital. Valjala, to the north-east, is the nearest town.

== Kaali crater ==
The village is the site of the Kaali crater, actually a series of craters formed by meteorite impacts more than 4,000 years ago. The main crater has become well-known and is now a popular tourist destination. Supporting a museum, cafeteria, shop, and hotel, the crater has led to tourism becoming an important part of Kaali's economy.

== Facilities ==
The village is served by a community school. Other local facilities are mostly associated with the tourist destination at the crater, including a cafeteria and hotel.

Before the administrative reform in 2017, the village was in Pihtla Parish.
