= Suure-Rootsi =

Village in Estonia

Coordinates: 58°13′27″N 22°43′08″E

- Village
- Interactive map of Suure-Rootsi
- Country: Estonia
- County: Saare County
- Parish: Saaremaa Parish
- Time zone: UTC+2 (EET)
  - Summer (DST): UTC+3 (EEST)

Suure-Rootsi is a village in Saaremaa Parish, Saare County in western Estonia.

== Name ==
Suure-Rootsi was attested in historical sources as Groß Rotzeküll in 1788, Rotzi gros in 1798, Gross Rotzküll in 1811, and Сууре Роотси (Suuree Rootsi) in 1903. The name of the village literally means 'big Swedish (village)', semantically contrasting with the neighboring Väike-Rootsi, literally 'little Swedish (village)'. Both villages are named after their historical Swedish population.

== History ==
From 1977 to 1997, together with the neighboring Väike-Rootsi and Ennu, Suure-Rootsi was included in the village of Vätta. After 1997, the name Vätta continued to apply to the area and to the Vätta Peninsula.

Before the 2017 administrative reform in Estonia, the village was in Pihtla Parish.
