= Matsiranna =

Village in Estonia

- Village
- Location within Estonia
- Coordinates: 58°20′40″N 22°50′06″E
- Country: Estonia
- County: Saare County
- Parish: Saaremaa Parish
- Time zone: UTC+2 (EET)
  - Summer (DST): UTC+3 (EEST)

Matsiranna is a village in Saaremaa Parish, Saare County in western Estonia.

Before the administrative reform in 2017, the village was in Pihtla Parish.
