= Väike-Rootsi =

Village in Estonia

Coordinates: 58°13′N 22°43′E

- Village
- Interactive map of Väike-Rootsi
- Country: Estonia
- County: Saare County
- Parish: Saaremaa Parish
- Time zone: UTC+2 (EET)
  - Summer (DST): UTC+3 (EEST)

Väike-Rootsi is a village in Saaremaa Parish, Saare County in western Estonia.

== Name ==
Väike-Rootsi was attested in historical sources as ihm Swedesszen dorppe in 1515. The name of the village literally means 'little Swedish (village)', semantically contrasting with the neighboring Suure-Rootsi, literally 'big Swedish (village)'. Both villages are named after their historical Swedish population.

== History ==
From 1977 to 1997, together with the neighboring Suure-Rootsi and Ennu, Väike-Rootsi was included in the village of Vätta. After 1997, the name Vätta continued to apply to the area and to the Vätta Peninsula.

Before the 2017 Estonian local government administrative reforms, the village was in Pihtla Parish.
