= Pihtla Parish =

Former municipality of Estonia

Coordinates: 58°18′15″N 22°41′57″E

Pihtla Parish Pihtla vald
- Former municipality of Estonia
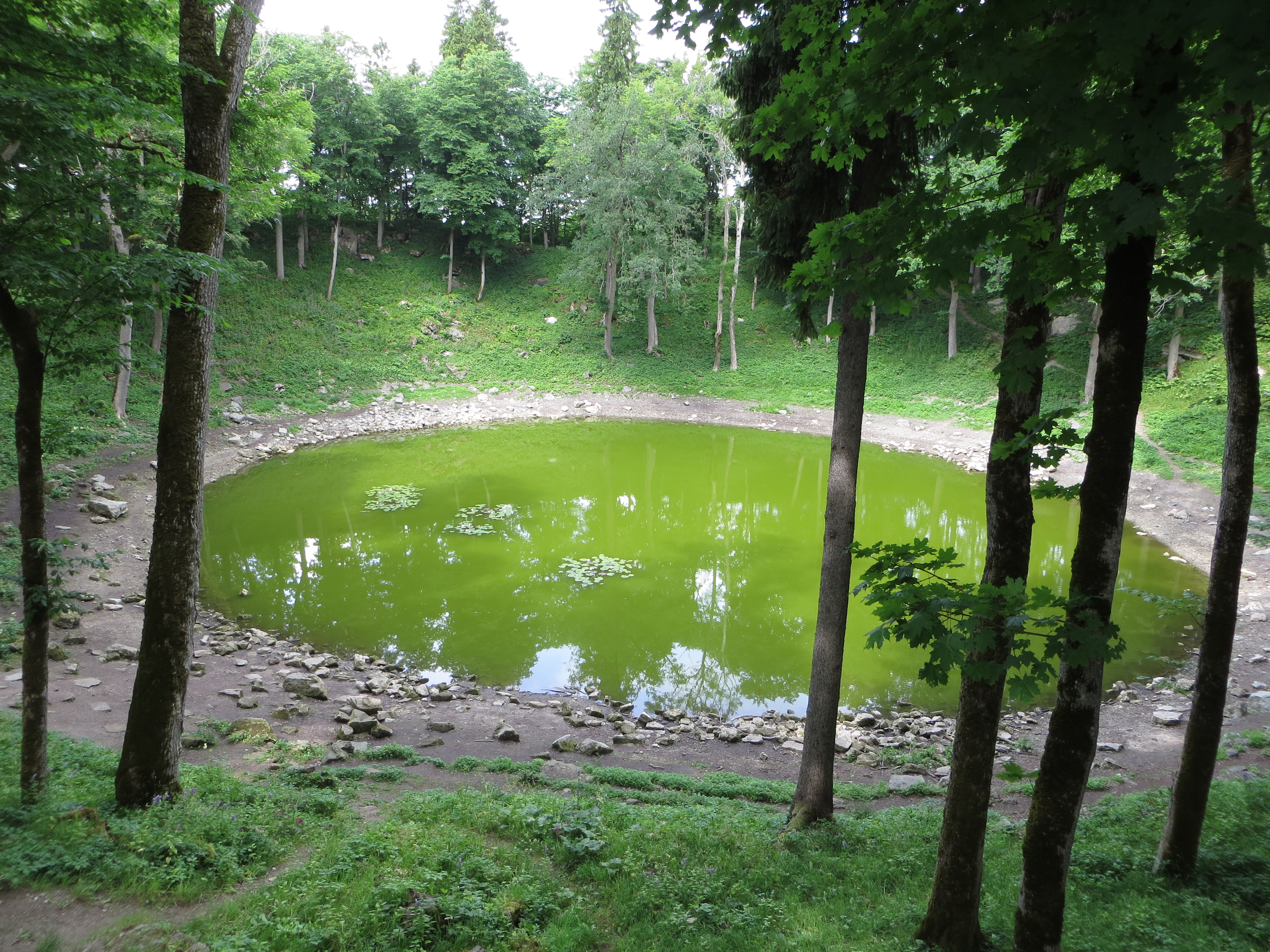
- Kaali meteorite crater

- Flag Coat of arms

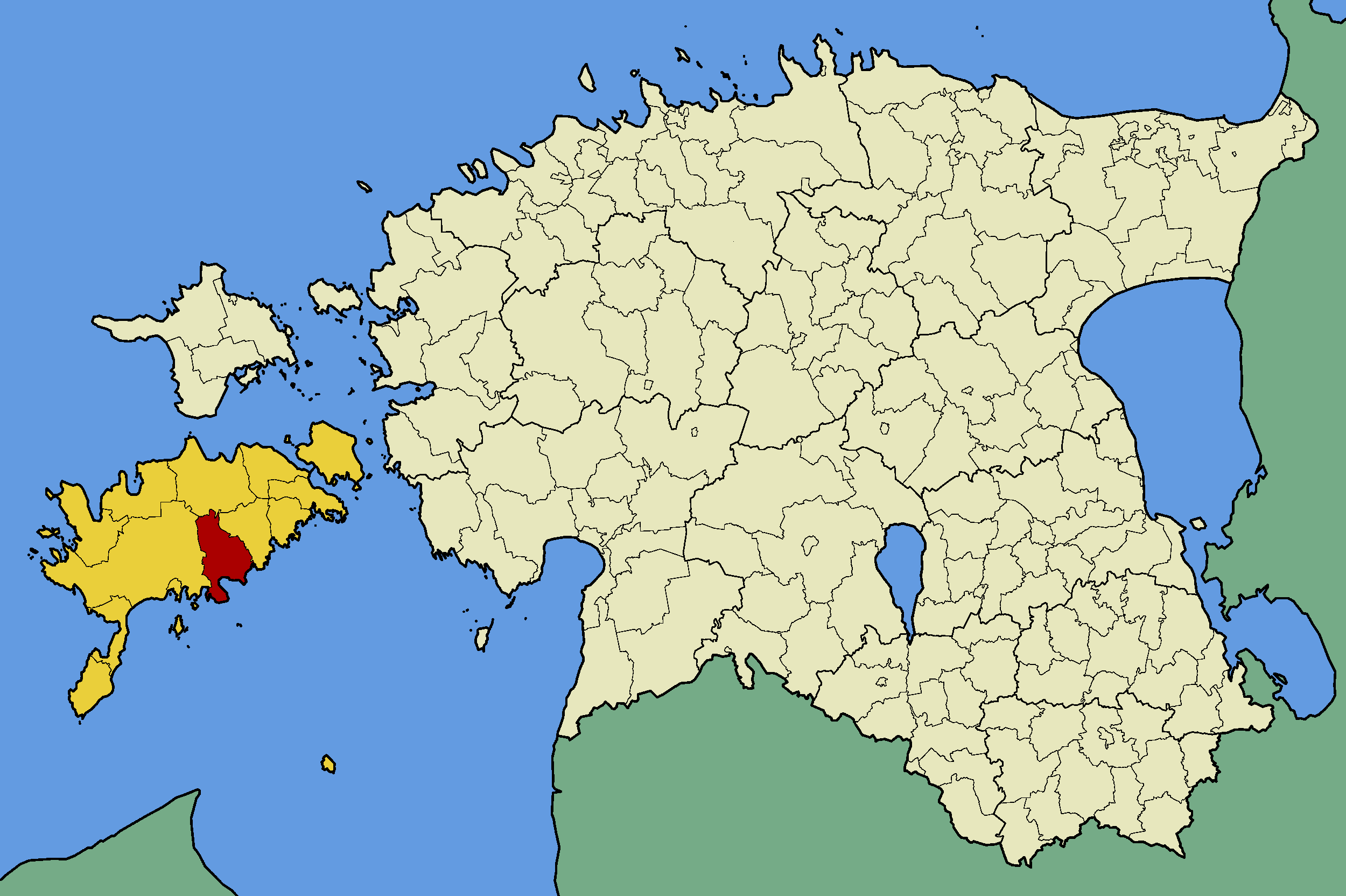
- Pihtla Parish within Saare County.
- Country: Estonia
- County: Saare County
- Administrative centre: Pihtla

Area
  - Total: 228.11 km^{2} (88.07 sq mi)

Population (01.01.2006)
  - Total: 1,400
  - Density: 6.1/km^{2} (16/sq mi)
- Website: www.pihtlavv.ee

Pihtla Parish was a municipality in Saare County, Estonia. The municipality had a population of 1,400 (as of 1 January 2006) and covered an area of 228.11 km².

During the administrative-territorial reform in 2017, all 12 municipalities on the island of Saaremaa were merged into a single municipality – Saaremaa Parish.

== Villages ==
Eiste - Ennu - Haeska - Hämmelepa - Iilaste - Ilpla - Kaali - Kailuka - Kangrusselja - Kiritu - Kõljala - Kõnnu - Kuusiku - Laheküla - Leina - Liiva - Liiva-Putla - Masa - Matsiranna - Metsaküla - Mustla - Nässuma - Pihtla - Püha - Rahniku - Räimaste - Rannaküla - Reeküla - Reo - Sagariste - Salavere - Sandla - Sauaru - Saue-Putla - Sepa - Sutu - Suure-Rootsi - Tõlluste - Väike-Rootsi - Väljaküla - Vanamõisa

== See also ==
- Municipalities of Estonia
