= Laheküla, Muhu Parish =

Village in Estonia

Coordinates: 58°32′39″N 23°13′45″E

Laheküla
- Village
- Interactive map of Laheküla
- Country: Estonia
- County: Saare County
- Parish: Muhu Parish
- Time zone: UTC+2 (EET)
  - Summer (DST): UTC+3 (EEST)

Laheküla is a village in Muhu Parish, Saare County in western Estonia.
