= Sandla, Estonia =

Village in Estonia

Coordinates: 58°19′N 22°51′E

Sandla
- Village
- Interactive map of Sandla
- Country: Estonia
- County: Saare County
- Parish: Saaremaa Parish
- Time zone: UTC+2 (EET)
  - Summer (DST): UTC+3 (EEST)

Sandla is a village in Saaremaa Parish, Saare County in western Estonia.

Before the administrative reform in 2017, the village was in Pihtla Parish.

== Notable people ==
- Tarmo Kõuts (born 1953), politician and former military commander was born in Sandla.
