= Pihtla =

Village in Estonia

- Village
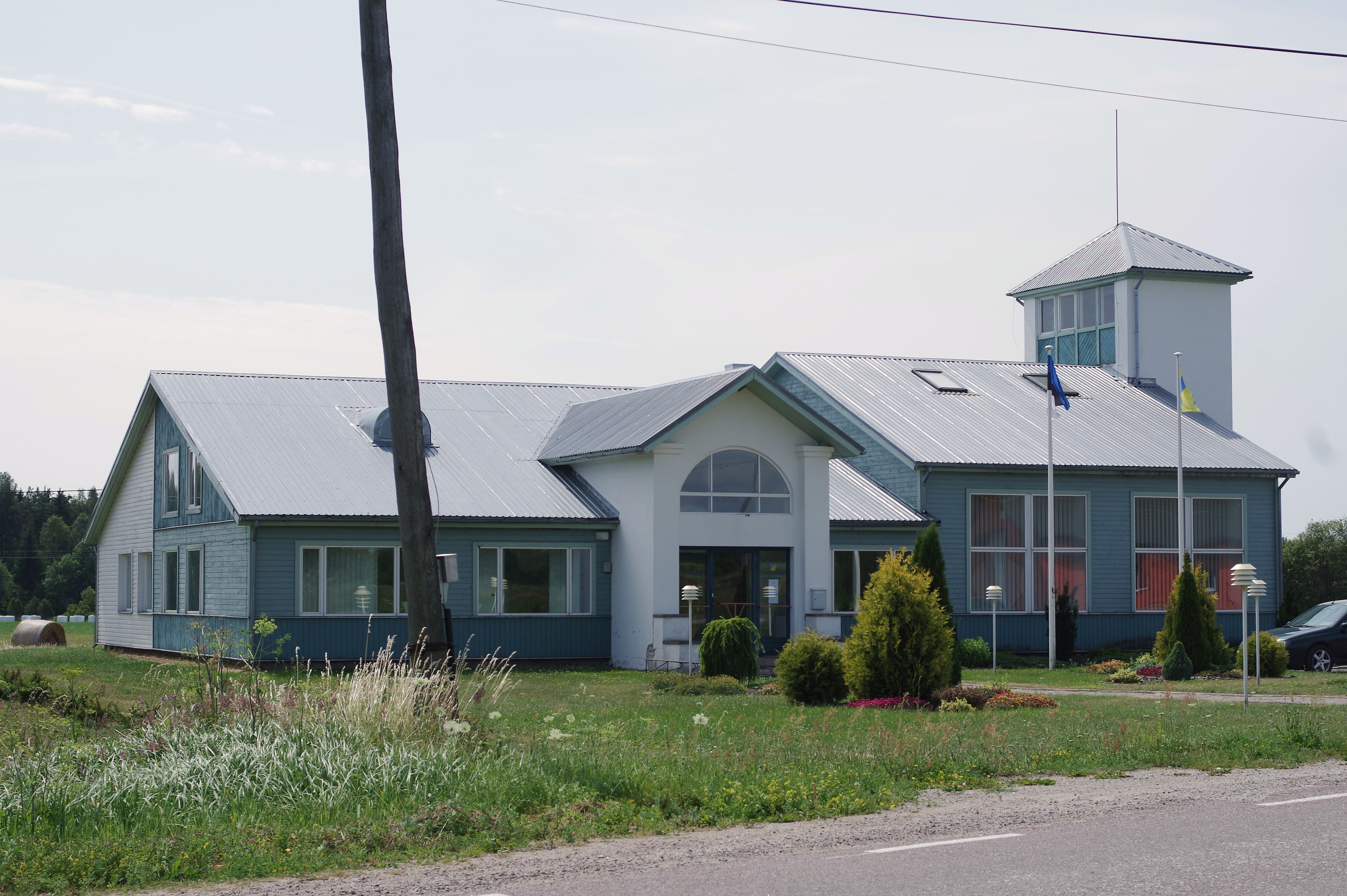
- Pihtla community center

- Location within Estonia
- Coordinates: 58°18′08″N 22°41′52″E
- Country: Estonia
- County: Saare County
- Parish: Saaremaa Parish
- Time zone: UTC+2 (EET)
  - Summer (DST): UTC+3 (EEST)

Pihtla is a village in Saaremaa Parish, Saare County, in western Estonia.

Before the administrative reform in 2017, the village was in Pihtla Parish.
