= Ilpla =

Village in Estonia

Coordinates: 58°17′N 22°40′E

- Village
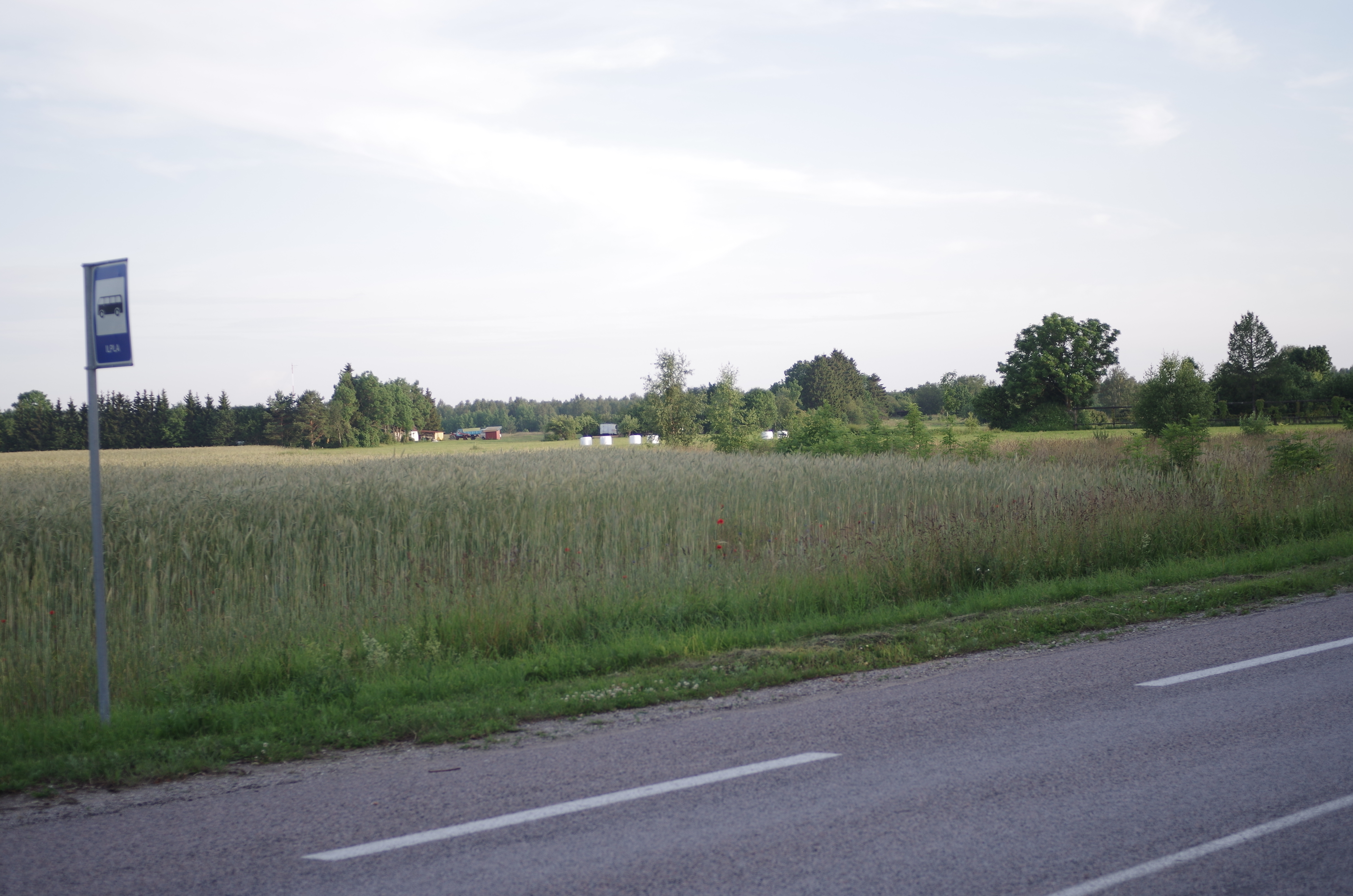
- Interactive map of Ilpla
- Country: Estonia
- County: Saare County
- Parish: Saaremaa Parish
- Time zone: UTC+2 (EET)
  - Summer (DST): UTC+3 (EEST)

Ilpla is a village in Saaremaa Parish, Saare County in western Estonia.

Before the administrative reform in 2017, the village was part of Pihtla Parish.

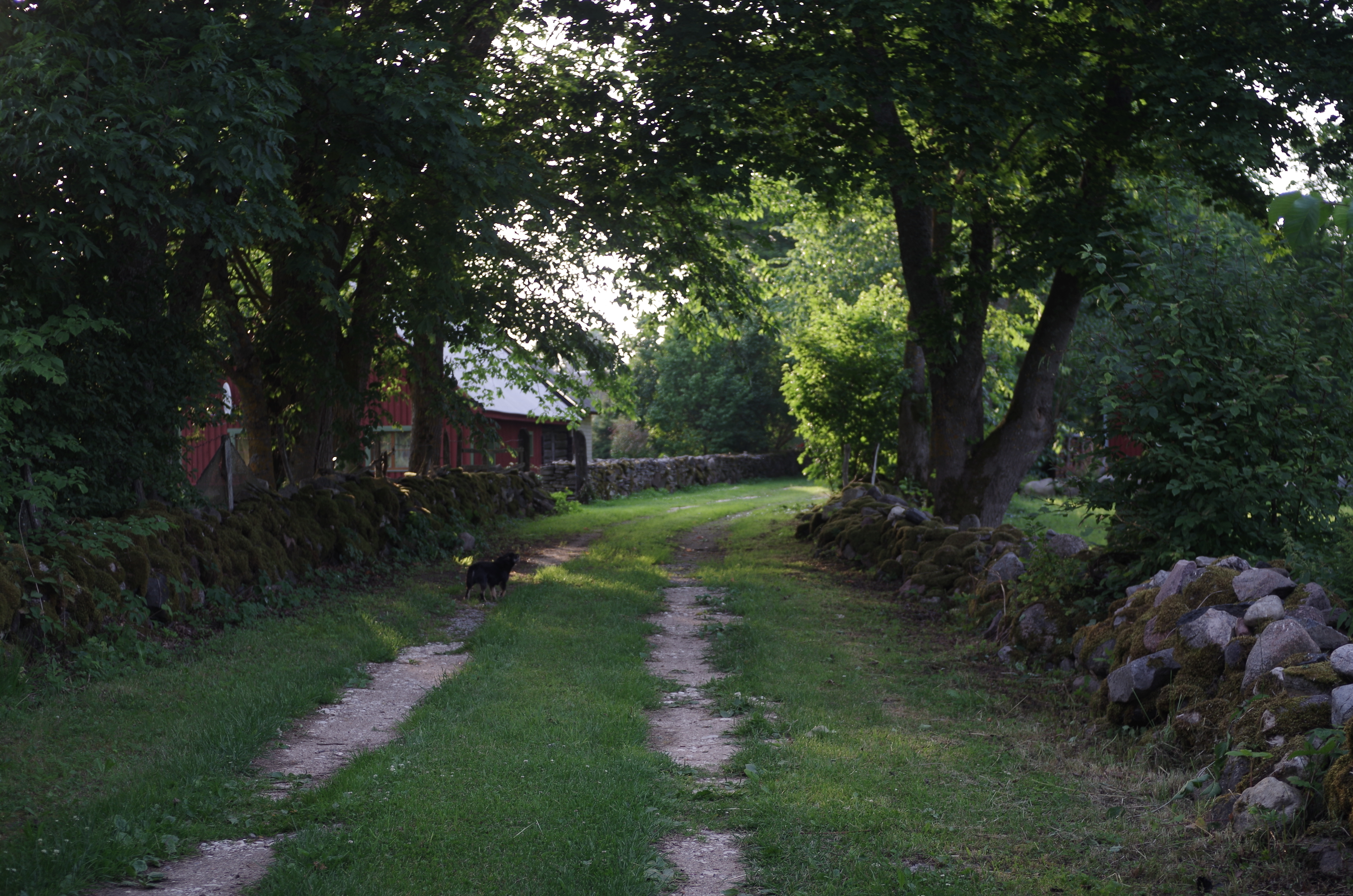
Village road in Ilpla
