= Kõljala =

Village in Estonia

Coordinates: 58°21′57″N 22°41′26″E

- Village
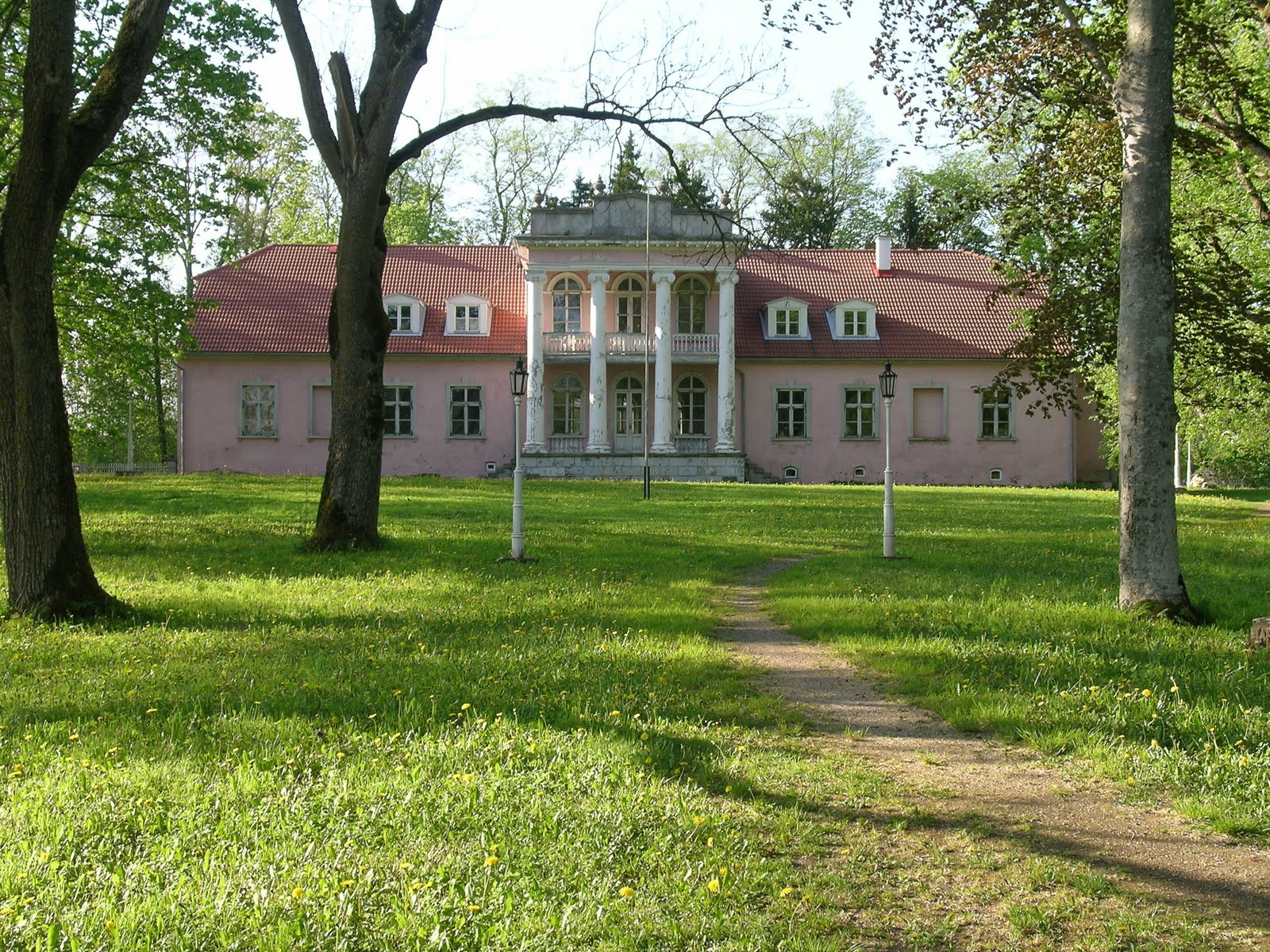
- Kõljala manor
- Interactive map of Kõljala
- Country: Estonia
- County: Saare County
- Parish: Saaremaa Parish
- Time zone: UTC+2 (EET)
  - Summer (DST): UTC+3 (EEST)

Kõljala is a village in Saaremaa Parish, Saare County in western Estonia.

Before the administrative reform in 2017, the village was in Pihtla Parish.

== Kõljala Manor ==
Kõljala estate (German: Kölljall) traces its history to 1250, when it belonged to the Baltic German family von Buxhoeveden. It has subsequently belonged to various Baltic noble families but was expropriated during the land reform following the declaration of independence of Estonia in 1919. From 1921 to 1955 it housed an agricultural school and was later used as a kolkhoz until Estonia re-gained its independence in 1991. The main building dates from the 18th century; the dominating portico was added during the 19th century.

== Notable residents ==
- Karl Nikolai von Nolcken (1830-1913), Baltic German clergyman and writer

== See also ==
- List of palaces and manor houses in Estonia
