= Kaali crater =

Group of nine impact craters in Estonia

- Location within Estonia
- Location: Estonia; 58°22′22″N 22°40′10″E

Impact crater structure
- Confidence: Confirmed
- Diameter: 110 m (360 ft)
- Age: 3237+/-10 ^{14}C yr BP

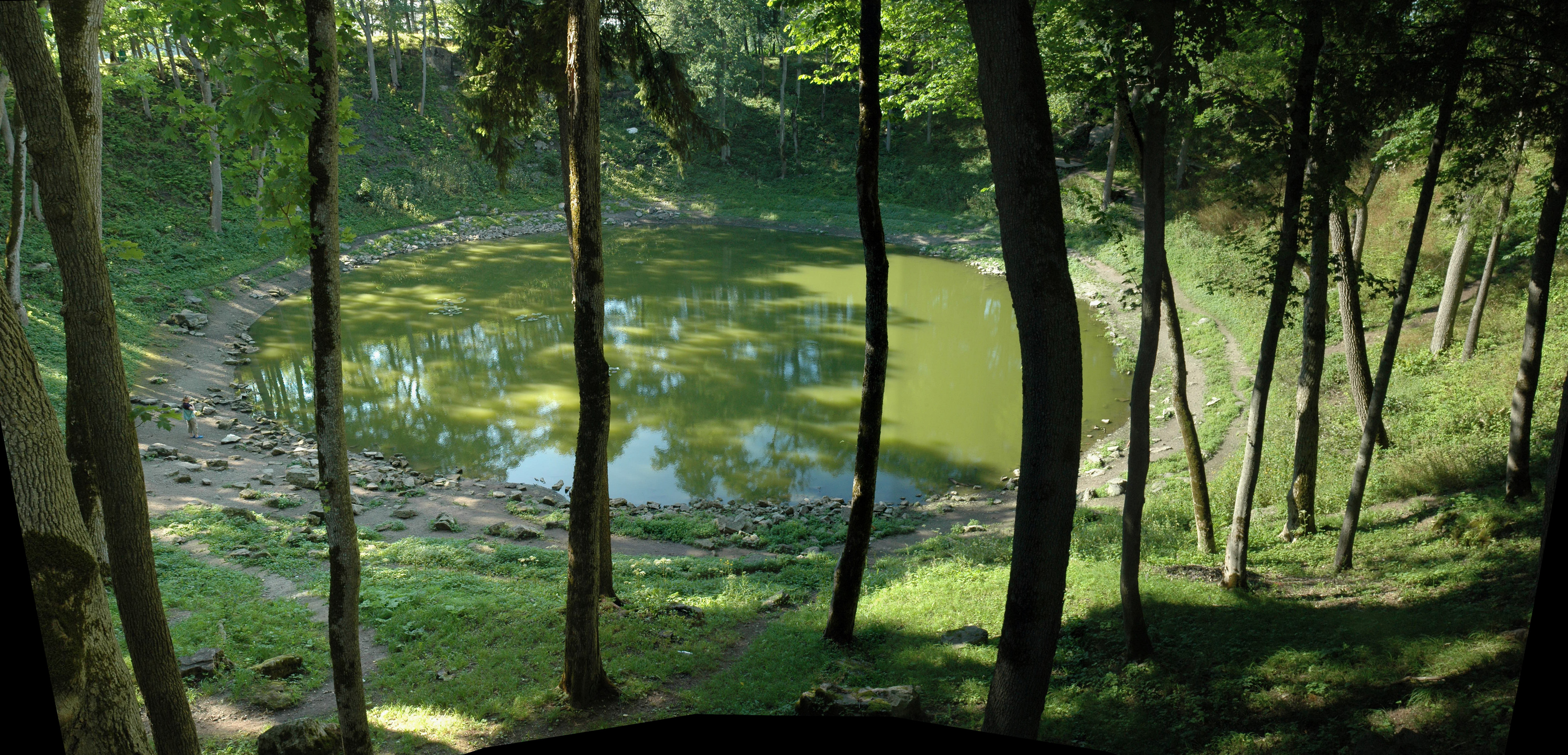
The crater as viewed from near the rim

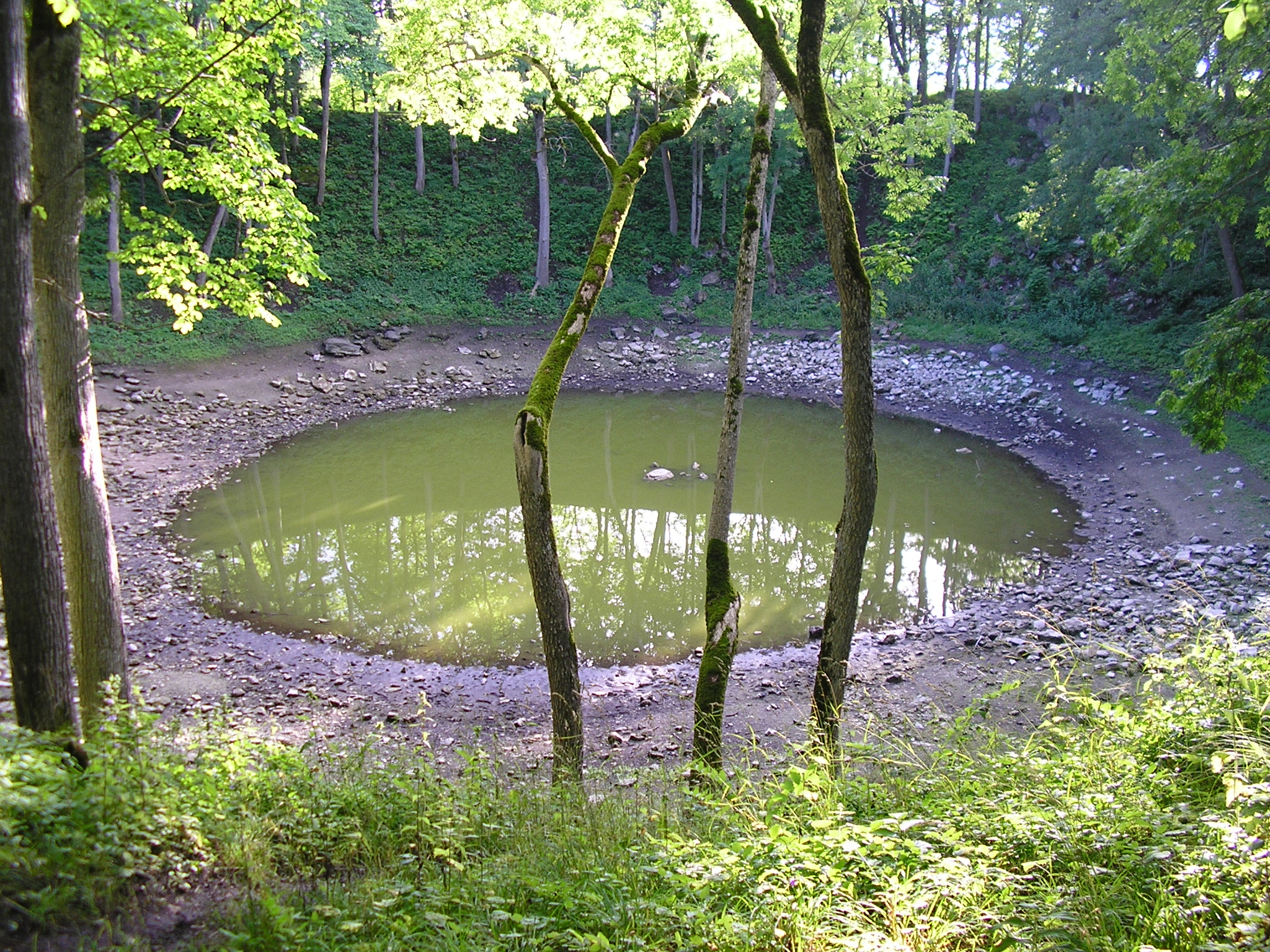
The main crater is nearly circular. When the water level is low, rocks can be seen penetrating the surface in the middle of the crater.

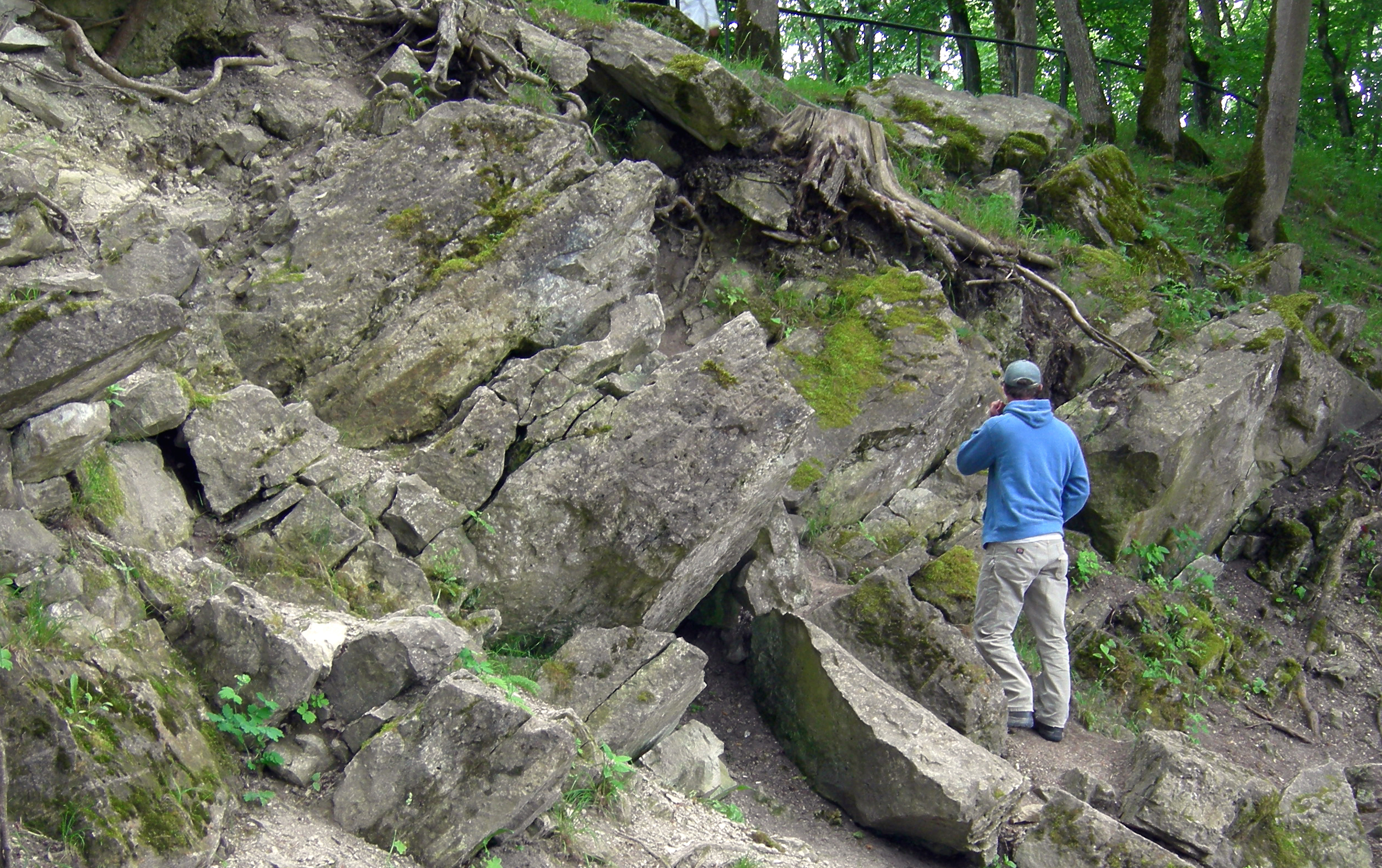
Tilted dolomite bedrock in the walls of the main crater

Kaali is a group of nine meteorite craters in the village of Kaali on the Estonian island of Saaremaa. The most recent estimates put its formation shortly after 1530–1450 BC (3237 ± 10 ^{14}C yr BP). It was created by an impact event and is one of the few impact events that has occurred in a populated area (others are Henbury craters in Australia and Carancas crater in Peru).

Before the 1930s, there were several hypotheses about the origin of the crater, including theories involving volcanism and karst processes. Its meteoritic origins were first conclusively demonstrated by Ivan Reinvald in 1928, 1933 and 1937.

== Formation ==
The impact is thought to have happened in the Holocene period, around 3,500 years ago. The estimates of the age of the Kaali impact structure (Saaremaa Island, Estonia) provided by different authors vary by as much as 6,000 years, ranging from ~6,400 to ~400 years before current era (BCE). Analysis of silicate spherules in Estonian bogs show that the possible age of the impact craters could be approximately 7,600 years. A study based on elevated iridium signal in a nearby bog suggested the much younger age of 4th century BC. The craters were formed by a meteor with an estimated impact velocity of between 10 and 20 km/s (6.2 and 12.4 mi/s) with a total mass of between 20 and 80 metric tonnes. According to some researchers, the meteor arrived from the north-east.

At an altitude of five to ten km (20,000 to 30,000 ft), the meteor broke into pieces and fell to the Earth in fragments, the largest of which produced a crater with a diameter of 110 m (360 ft) and a depth of 22 m (72 ft). The explosion removed approximately 81,000 m^{3} (2,900,000 cu ft) of dolomite and other rocks and formed a 7 to 8 km (20,000 to 30,000 ft) tall, extremely hot gas flow. Vegetation was incinerated up to 6 km (3.7 mi) from the impact site.

Lake Kaali (Estonian: Kaali järv) is on the bottom of this crater. Eight smaller craters are also associated with this bombardment of meteor fragments. Their diameters range from 12 to 40 m (39 to 131 ft) and their respective depths vary from one to four metres (3.3 to 13.1 ft). They are all within one kilometre (0.62 mi) of the main crater.

== Effects ==
According to the theory of a more recent impact, Estonia at the time of impact was in the Nordic Bronze Age and the site was forested with a small human population. The impact energy of about 80 TJ (20 kilotons of TNT) is comparable with that of the Hiroshima bomb blast. It incinerated forests within a six km (3.7 mi) radius. There is the possibility that an even larger fragment fell into the sea, triggering seismic waves, and tsunamis up to 20-30 m high in the Baltic Sea, feeding the Norse mythology too.

== Kaali as a cult site ==
Lake Kaali is best known as a meteorite crater. When the meteorite fell on Saaremaa, it was already quite densely populated and caused a catastrophe for the locals. Those who survived may have interpreted this phenomenon as the death of the sun. The dates for the formation of the lake vary, but according to the latest data it would have been between about 1600 and 800 BC.

Archaeological excavations on Lake Kaali in 1976-1979 revealed a fortified settlement on the northeastern side. Most of the finds allowed the settlement to be dated to the pre-Roman Iron Age (500 BC-50 AD), although there were also a few finds that dated to the 8th-6th centuries BC. The unusual location of the settlement suggests that it is more of a cult site than any other structure.

Lake Kaali as a cult site is also indicated by a unique silver treasure and a separately found silver ring. Such finds are unusual for a normal settlement. The jewelry is dated to between 500 BC and 450 AD.

Lake Kaali was probably surrounded by a stone wall in ancient times, the base of the wall is 2.3-2.8 m wide. There was no cultural layer outside the wall, but inside there were many bones of domestic animals (horses, dogs, sheep, pigs and oxen). Most of these were animal teeth and parts of skulls, which could be assumed to have been sacrifices. Shards of pottery were found a little away from the animal bones, allowing the circular wall to be dated to around the pre-Roman Iron Age.

== In mythology ==
Scholars, such as Karl Kello, maintain that the event featured prominently in regional mythology. It was, and still is, considered a sacred lake. There is archaeological evidence that it may well have been a place of ritual sacrifice. At some point during the early Iron Age, the lake was surrounded by a stone wall 470 m (1,540 ft) long, with a median width of about 2.5 m (8.2 ft) and an average height of 2.0 m (6.6 ft).

Finnish mythology has stories that may originate with the formation of Kaali. One of them is in runes 47, 48 and 49 of the Kalevala epic: Louhi, the evil wizard, steals the Sun and fire from people, causing total darkness. Ukko, the god of the sky, orders a new Sun to be made from a spark. The virgin of the air starts to make a new Sun, but the spark drops from the sky and hits the ground. This spark goes to an "Aluen" or "Kalevan" lake and causes its water to rise. Finnish heroes see the ball of fire falling somewhere "behind the Neva River" (the direction of Estonia from Karelia). The heroes head in that direction to seek fire, and they finally gather flames from a forest fire.

According to a theory proposed by Lennart Meri, it is possible that Saaremaa was the legendary Thule island, first mentioned by ancient Greek geographer Pytheas, and the name Thule could have been connected to the Finnic word tule '(of) fire' and the folklore of Estonia, which depicts the birth of the crater lake in Kaali. Kaali was considered the place where "The sun went to rest."

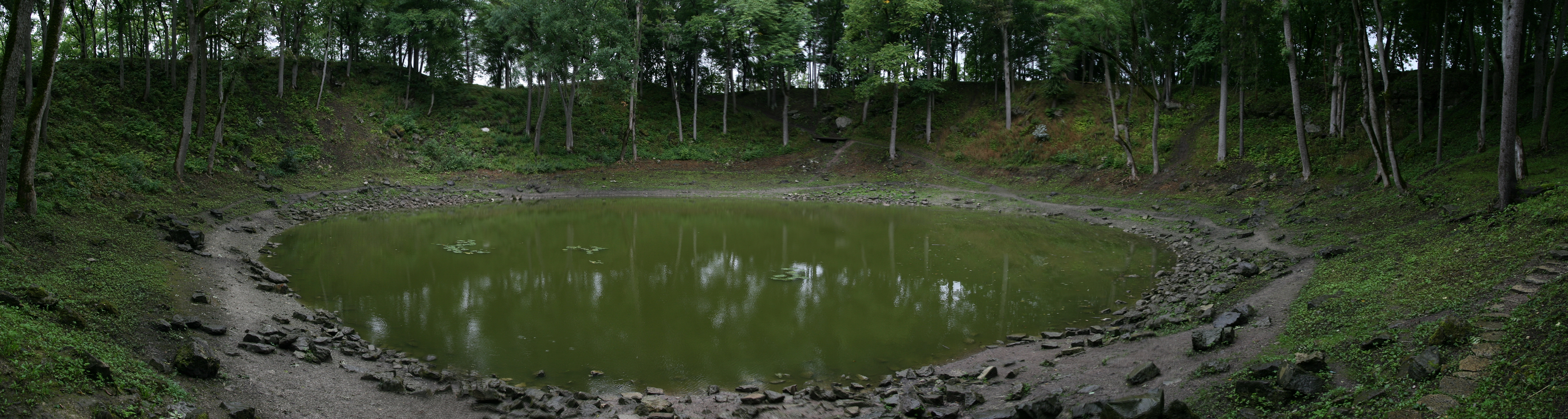
The main crater

== Namesake ==
The asteroid 4227 Kaali is named after the crater. Except for their names, there is no connection between this asteroid and the crater.

== Meteoritic iron artefacts ==
In 2023, archaeologists analysed the Bronze Age Mörigen Arrowhead, found in Switzerland; it was made of meteoritic iron whose composition suggested its origin from the Kaali meteorite.

Records
Preceded by Henbury	The last impact event on Earth; 1300 BC – present	Succeeded by Incumbent
