= Rannu (disambiguation) =

Rannu is a small borough in Elva Parish, Tartu County, Estonia.

Rannu may also refer to the following places:

== Estonia ==
- Rannu, Lääne-Viru County, village in Viru-Nigula Parish, Lääne-Viru County
- Rannu, Pärnu County, village in Lääneranna Parish, Pärnu County
- Rannu Parish, former municipality in Tartu County

== India ==
- Rannu, Uttar Pradesh, a village
