= Ännikse Nature Reserve =

Nature reserve in Estonia

- Location within Estonia
- Location: Estonia
- Coordinates: 58°28′N 23°50′E
- Area: 540 hectares (1,300 acres)
- Established: 2007

Ännikse Nature Reserve is a nature reserve which is located in Pärnu County, Estonia.

The area of the nature reserve is 540 hectares (1,300 acres).

The protected area was founded in 2007 to protect biodiversity in Ännikse, Rauksi and Koeri village (all in Varbla Parish).
