= Paatsalu =

Village in Estonia

- village
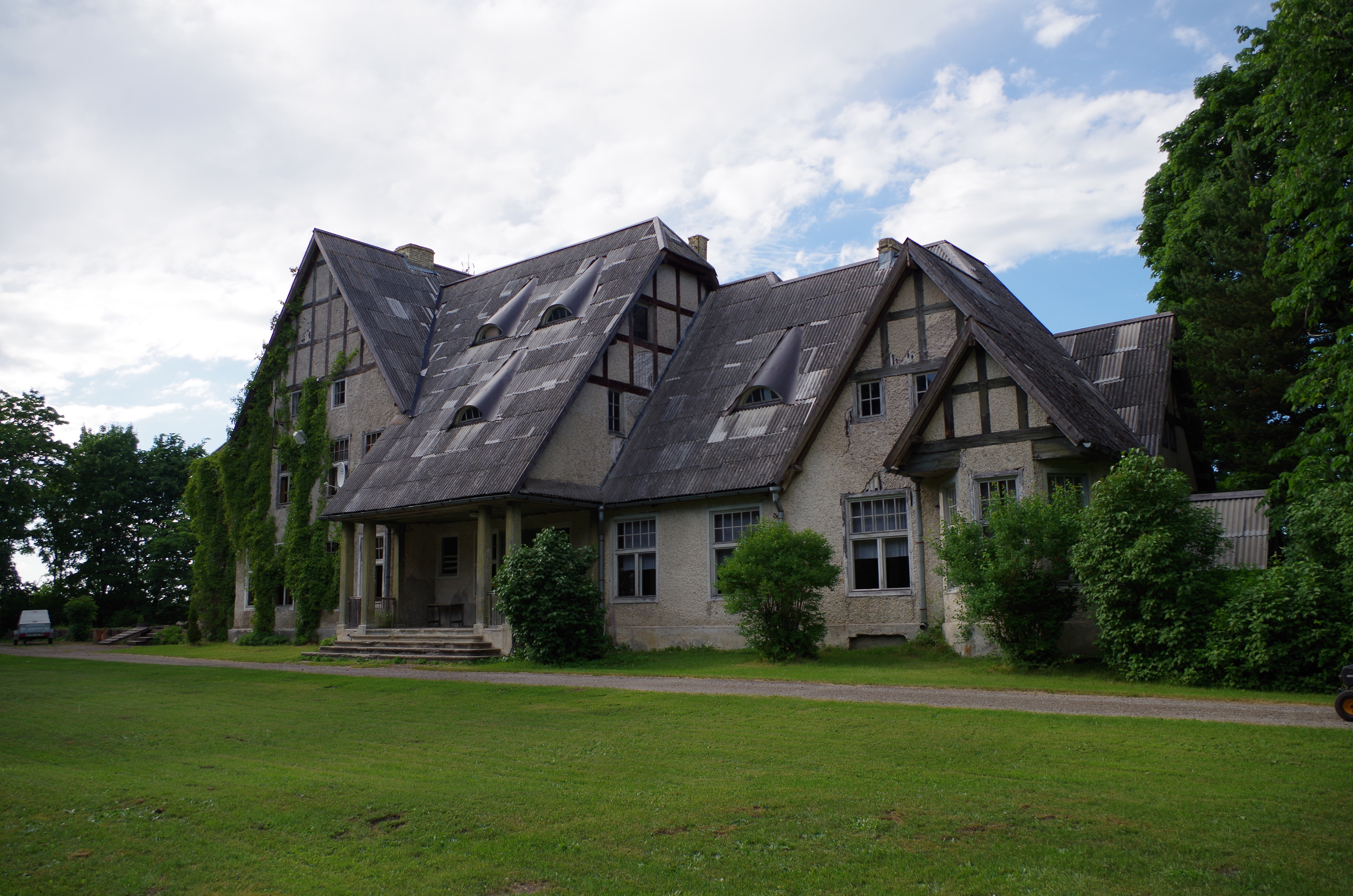
- Illuste manor, built in 1646

- Location in Estonia
- Coordinates: 58°30′41″N 23°41′45″E
- Country: Estonia
- County: Pärnu County
- Municipality: Lääneranna Parish

Population (01.01.2011)
  - Total: 73

Paatsalu (German: Patzal) is a village in Lääneranna Parish, Pärnu County, in southwestern Estonia, on the coast of the Gulf of Riga. It had a population of 73 on 1 January 2011.

The southeastern part of the village is covered by Paadrema Nature Reserve. Part of Nehatu Nature Reserve is also located around Kahvatu Bay.

== Notable people ==
Notable people that were born in Paatsalu include the following:

- Priit Raudkivi (1920–1970), actor
- Jaan Teemant (1872–1941?), lawyer and politician, born in the village of Illuste, now part of Paatsalu
