= Kelu =

Kelu may refer to:

- Kelu, Estonia
- Kelu, Semnan, Iran

== See also ==
- Kelu-1, a binary brown dwarf
