= Tamba, Estonia =

Village in Estonia

Tamba
- village
- Location in Estonia
- Coordinates: 58°29′30″N 23°41′53″E
- Country: Estonia
- County: Pärnu County
- Municipality: Lääneranna Parish

Population (01.01.2011)
  - Total: 9

Tamba is a village in Lääneranna Parish, Pärnu County, in southwestern Estonia, on the coast of the Gulf of Riga. It had only nine inhabitants on 1 January 2011.

The eastern part of the village is within the Paadrema Nature Reserve.
