= Radi =

Radi may refer to:

- Raidi (born 1938), Chinese Communist Party politician in Tibet
- Radhi (Bhutan), a village in eastern Bhutan's Trashigang district
- Rädi, a village in Pärnu County, southwestern Estonia
- RADI, a restricted authorised deposit-taking institution
