= Rootsi-Aruküla =

Village in Estonia

- Village
- Location within Estonia
- Coordinates: 58.6936°N 24.0472°E
- Country: Estonia
- County: Pärnu County
- Parish: Lääneranna Parish
- Time zone: UTC+2 (EET)
  - Summer (DST): UTC+3 (EEST)

Rootsi-Aruküla is a village that is located in Lääneranna Parish, Pärnu County in Estonia.

Before 2017, this village belonged to Lihula Parish, Lääne County and in this time it bore the name Aruküla. Before 2014 this village was part of village Seira.
