= Tousi =

Tousi may refer to:

- Ahmad Tousi, an Iranian football coach
- Mahyad Tousi, Iranian-American filmmaker, scriptwriter, producer and director
- Maryam Tousi, an Iranian sprinter
- Tõusi, a village in Varbla Parish, Pärnu County, Estonia
