= Järise =

Järise may refer to several places in Estonia:

- Järise, Pärnu County, village in Lääneranna Parish, Pärnu County
- Järise, Saare County, village in Saaremaa Parish, Saare County
