= Korju =

Village in Estonia

- village
- Location in Estonia
- Coordinates: 58°30′27″N 23°49′13″E
- Country: Estonia
- County: Pärnu County
- Municipality: Lääneranna Parish

Population (01.01.2011)
  - Total: 2

Korju is a village in Lääneranna Parish, Pärnu County, in southwestern Estonia. It has only 2 inhabitants (as of 1 January 2011). The western half of the village is covered by Paadrema Nature Reserve.
