= Matsi, Pärnu County =

Village in Estonia

Matsi
- village
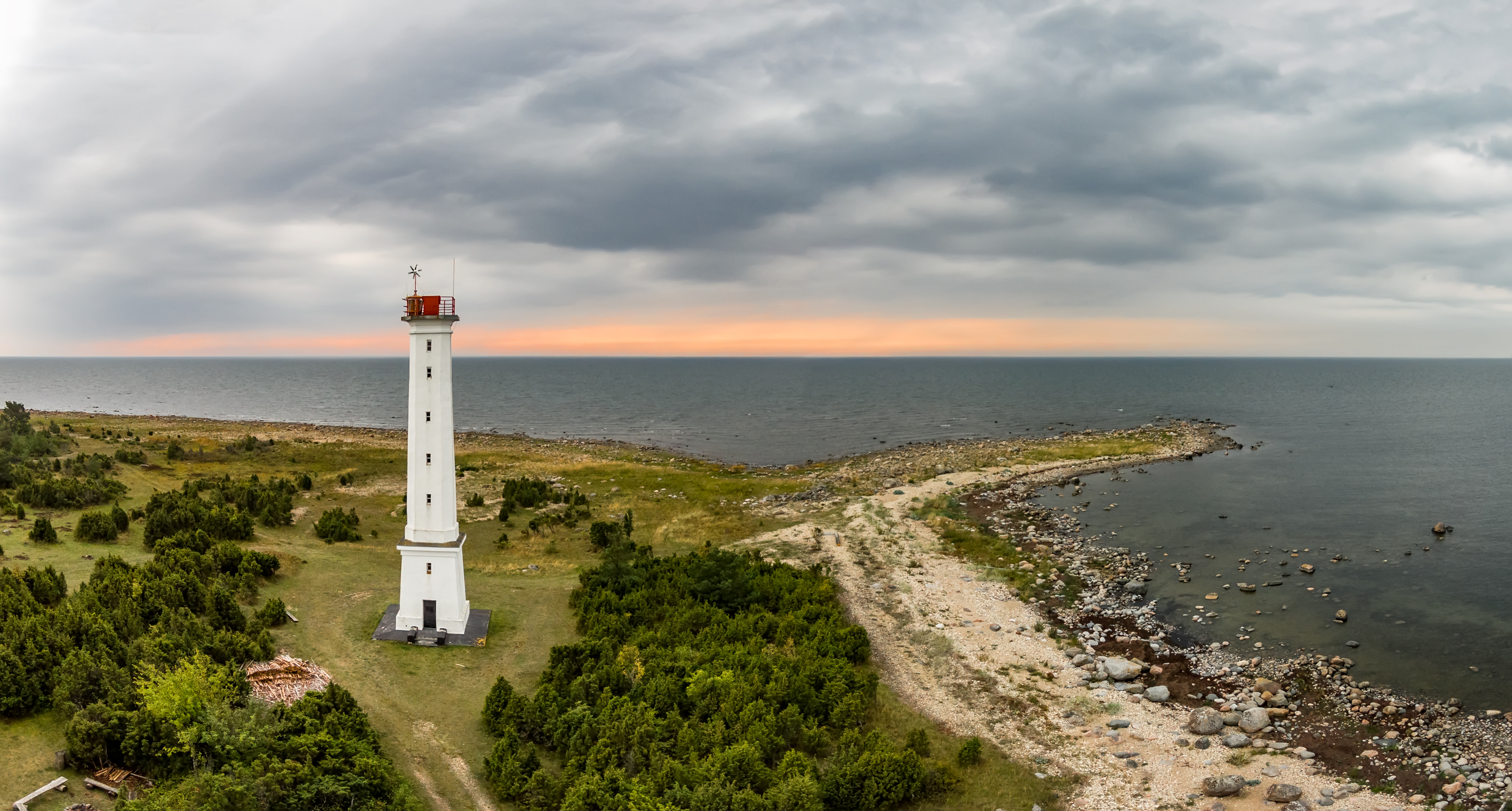
- Sõmeri lighthouse

- Location in Estonia
- Coordinates: 58°22′38″N 23°44′02″E
- Country: Estonia
- County: Pärnu County
- Municipality: Lääneranna Parish

Population (01.01.2011)
  - Total: 17
- Website: www.saulepi.planet.ee

Matsi is a village in Lääneranna Parish, Pärnu County, in southwestern Estonia, on the coast of the Gulf of Riga. It has a population of 17 (as of 1 January 2011).

Orasaare Manor (Orrasaar), a support manor of Saulepi manor, was located in Matsi.

== Notable people ==
Notable people that were born or lived in Matsi include the following:

- Kristjan Palusalu (1908–1987), heavyweight wrestler and Olympic winner, born in Varemurru, now part of Matsi
