= Piha (disambiguation) =

Piha is a coastal settlement on the western coast of the Auckland Region in New Zealand.

Piha may also refer to:

== Places ==
- Piha, Estonia, a village in southwestern Estonia

== Animals ==
- Lipaugus, a genus of birds
- Snowornis, a genus of birds formerly part of Lipaugus
- Spratelloides delicatulus, a species of fish

== Sports ==
- Professional Inline Hockey Association, an inline hockey league in the United States
