= Hõbesalu =

Village in Estonia

- village
- Location in Estonia
- Coordinates: 58°32′24″N 23°40′23″E
- Country: Estonia
- County: Pärnu County
- Municipality: Lääneranna Parish

Population (01.01.2011)
  - Total: 15

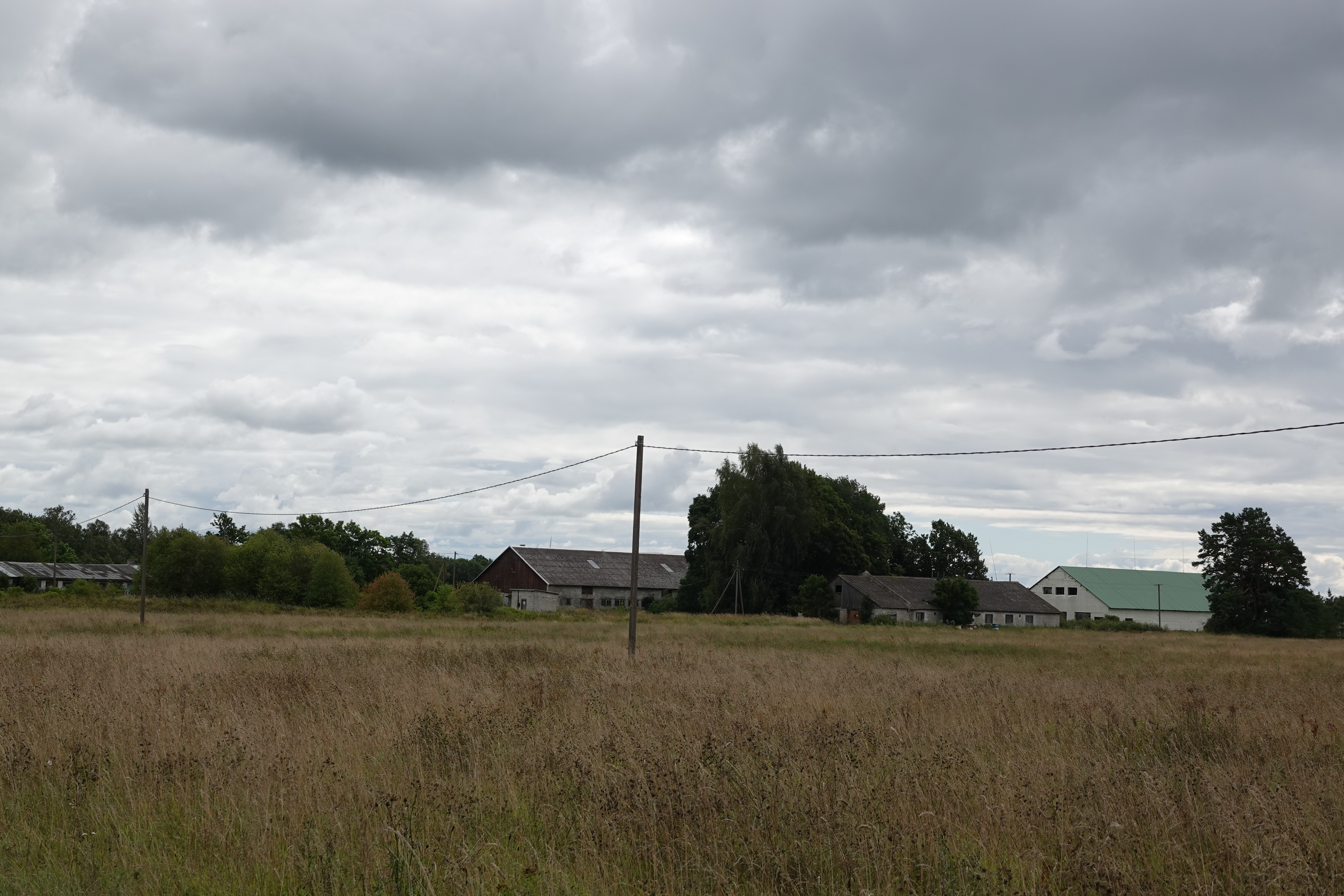

Hõbesalu is a village in Lääneranna Parish, Pärnu County, in southwestern Estonia, on the coast of the Gulf of Riga. It has a population of 15 (as of 1 January 2011).

Half of the village is covered by Nehatu Nature Reserve.
