= Muriste =

Village in Estonia

- village
- Location in Estonia
- Coordinates: 58°32′16″N 23°37′18″E
- Country: Estonia
- County: Pärnu County
- Municipality: Lääneranna Parish

Population (01.01.2011)
  - Total: 7

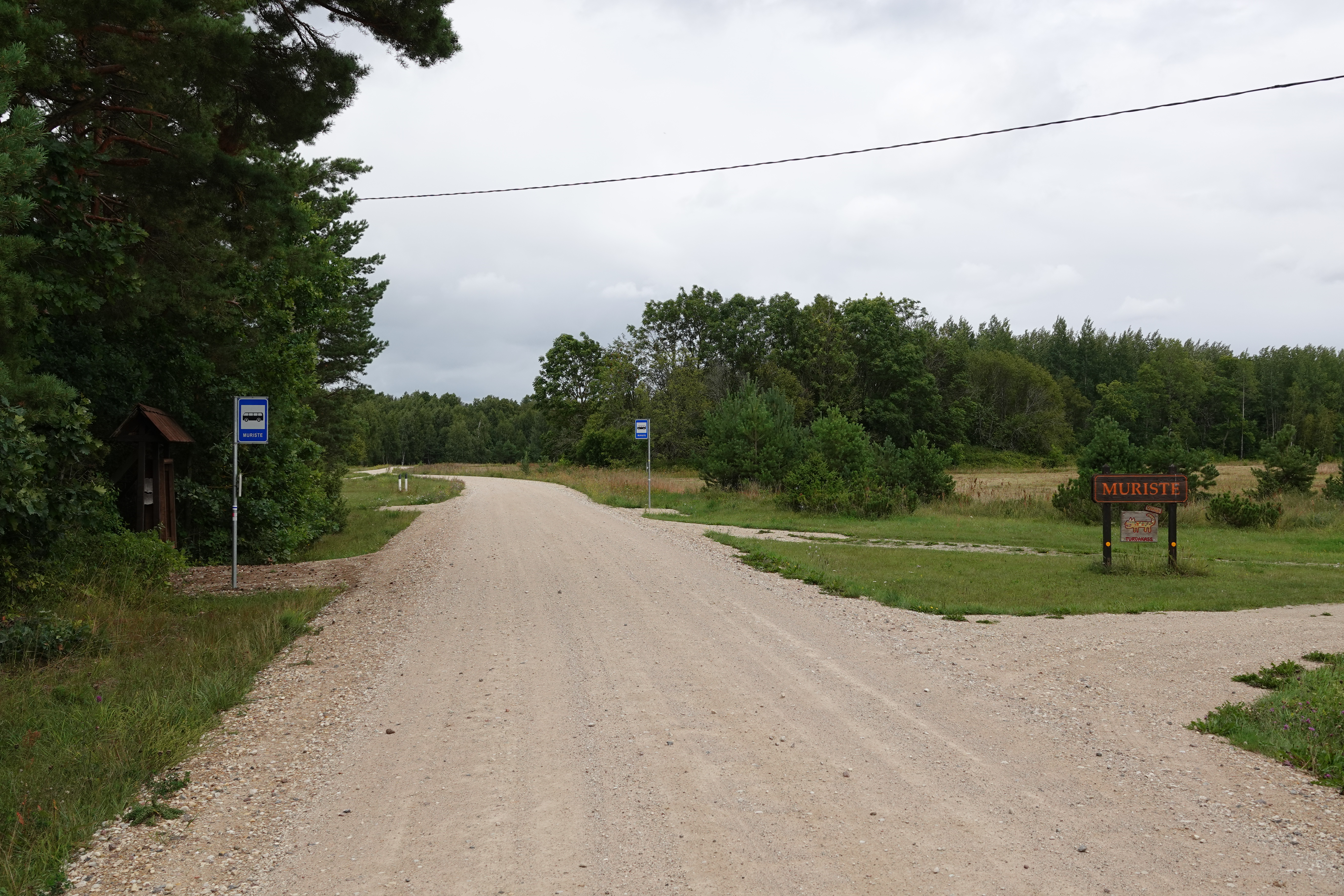
The bus stop (bussipeatus) in the village of Muriste, Lääneranna Parish, Pärnu County, Estonia

Muriste is a village in Lääneranna Parish, Pärnu County, in southwestern Estonia, on the coast of the Gulf of Riga. It has only 7 inhabitants (as of 1 January 2011).

Nehatu Nature Reserve covers the northeastern side of the village.
