= Rootsi =

Rootsi may refer to:

- Rootsi is an Estonian name for Sweden
- Rootsi, Hiiu County, village in Hiiumaa Parish, Hiiu County, Estonia
- Rootsi, Pärnu County, village in Lääneranna Parish, Pärnu County, Estonia
- Rootsi, Rapla County, village in Kohila Parish, Rapla County, Estonia
