= Kirikuküla =

Kirikuküla may refer to several places in Estonia:

- Kirikuküla, Pärnu County, village in Lääneranna Parish, Pärnu County
- Kirikuküla, Valga County, village in Tõrva Parish, Valga County
- Kirikuküla, Võru County, village in Antsla Parish, Võru County
- Kaarma-Kirikuküla, village in Saaremaa Parish, Saare County, known as Kirikuküla until 2014 when located in Kaarma Parish
- Kärla-Kirikuküla, village in Saaremaa Parish, Saare County, known as Kirikuküla until 2014 when located in Kärla Parish
