= Seira =

Seira may refer to:

== Places ==
- Seira, Aragon, a municipality in Aragon, Spain
- Seira, Estonia, a village in Estonia

== People ==
- Seira Anzai (安斉 星来) (born 2004), Japanese actress and model
- Seira Hatanaka (畠中 清羅) (born 1995), Japanese idol and former member of Nogizaka46
- Seira Hayakawa (早川 聖来) (born 2000), Japanese idol and former member of Nogizaka46
- Seira Hibiya, Japanese idol and former member of Yumemiru Adolescence
- Seira Miyazawa (宮澤 成良) (born 1993), Japanese idol and former member of Nogizaka46
- Seira Nagashima (永島 聖羅) (born 1995), Japanese idol and former member of Nogizaka46
- Seira Nakayama (中山 セイラ) (born 1983), Japanese sabre fencer
- Seira Ryū (劉 セイラ) (born 1985), Chinese–Japanese voice actress
- Seira Satō (佐藤 聖羅) (born 1992), Japanese idol and former member of SKE48
- Mei Seira (星来 芽依) (born 2002), Japanese professional wrestler

== Characters ==
- Seira, a character in the manga series Mermaid Melody Pichi Pichi Pitch
- Seira, a character in the anime series Endro!
- Seira Kuroda, a character in the drama television series Shōkōjo Seira

== Other uses ==
- Seira (springtail), a genus of slender springtails
- SEIRA, surface-enhanced infrared absorption spectroscopy, see List of materials analysis methods#S

== See also ==
- Seirae, was a town in ancient Arcadia
- Shōkōjo Seira, a 2009 Japanese drama television series
