= Võhma, Pärnu County =

Village in Estonia

Coordinates: 58°43′10″N 24°04′47″E

Võhma
- Village
- Interactive map of Võhma
- Country: Estonia
- County: Pärnu County
- Parish: Lääneranna Parish
- Time zone: UTC+2 (EET)
  - Summer (DST): UTC+3 (EEST)

Võhma is a village in Lääneranna Parish, Pärnu County, in western Estonia.
