= Haapsi =

Village in Estonia

- village
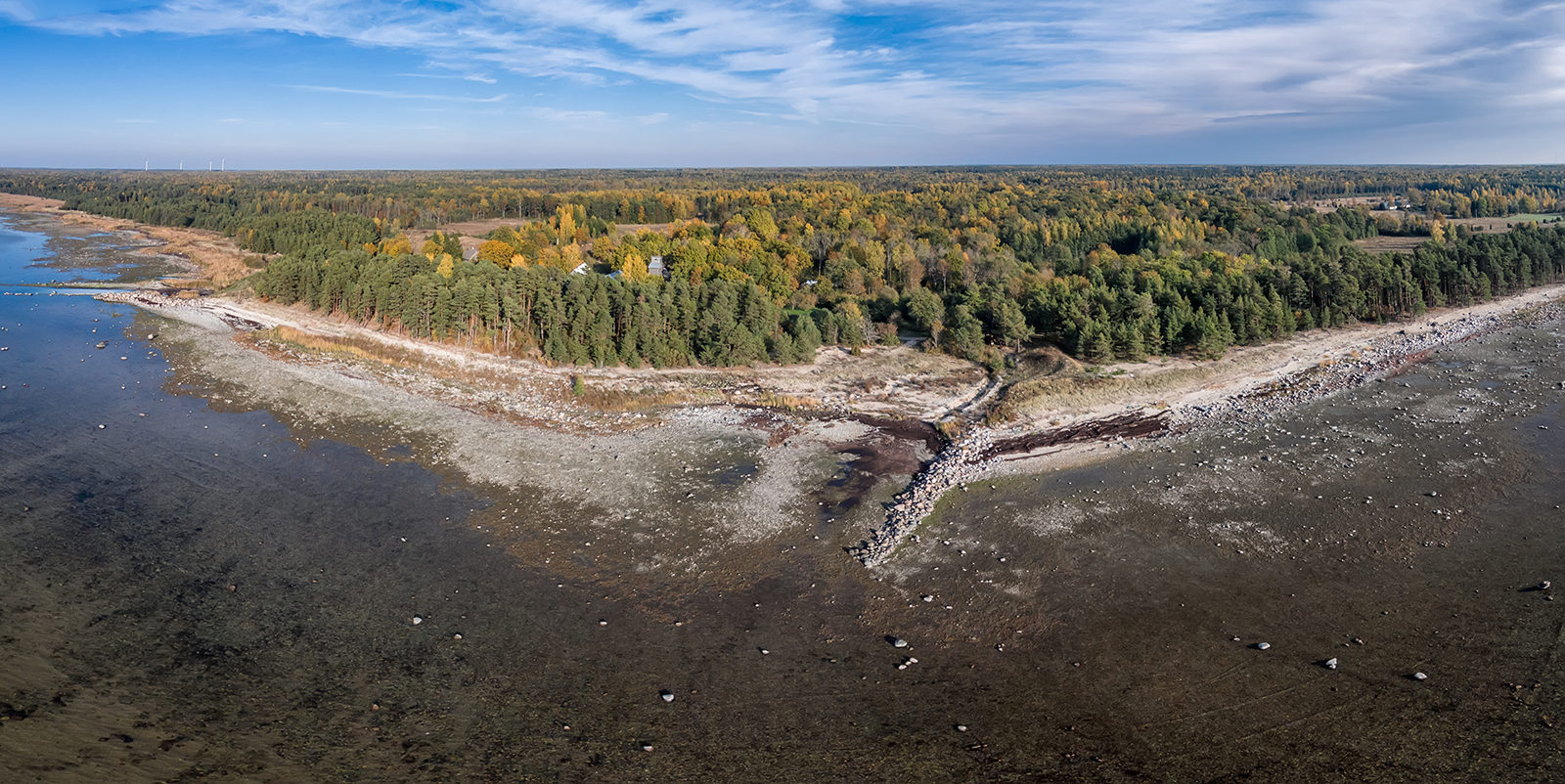

- Location in Estonia
- Coordinates: 58°23′48″N 23°43′03″E
- Country: Estonia
- County: Pärnu County
- Municipality: Lääneranna Parish

Population (01.01.2011)
  - Total: 4

Haapsi is a village in Lääneranna Parish, Pärnu County, in southwestern Estonia, on the coast of the Gulf of Riga. It has only 4 inhabitants (as of 1 January 2011).
