= Metsküla, Pärnu County =

Village in Estonia

Coordinates: 58°43′29″N 23°37′30″E

Metsküla
- Village
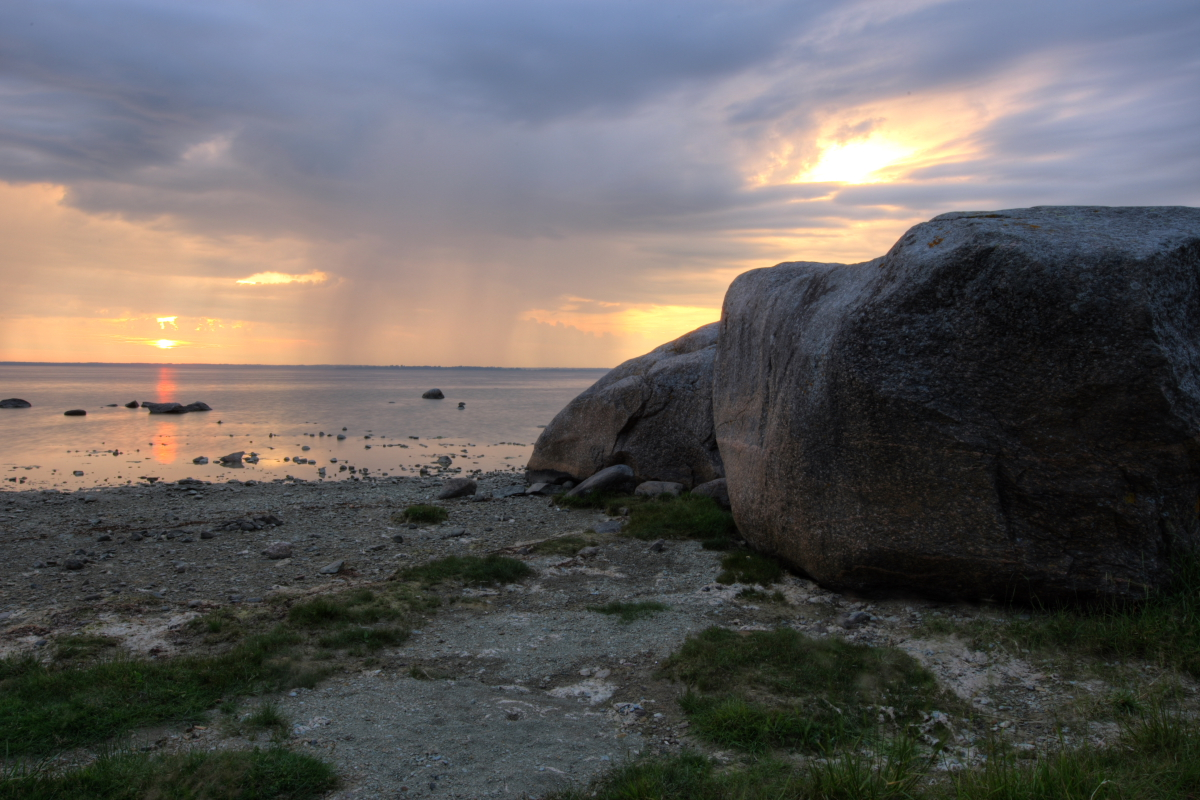
- Interactive map of Metsküla
- Country: Estonia
- County: Pärnu County
- Parish: Lääneranna Parish
- Time zone: UTC+2 (EET)
  - Summer (DST): UTC+3 (EEST)

Metsküla is a village in Lääneranna Parish, Pärnu County, in western Estonia.
