= Linnuse, Pärnu County =

Village in Estonia

Coordinates: 58°35′00″N 23°44′10″E

Linnuse
- Village
- Interactive map of Linnuse
- Country: Estonia
- County: Pärnu County
- Parish: Lääneranna Parish
- Time zone: UTC+2 (EET)
  - Summer (DST): UTC+3 (EEST)

Linnuse is a village in Lääneranna Parish, Pärnu County, in western Estonia.
