= Nõmme, Pärnu County =

Village in Estonia

Nõmme
- village
- Location in Estonia
- Coordinates: 58°28′33″N 23°42′40″E
- Country: Estonia
- County: Pärnu County
- Municipality: Lääneranna Parish

Population (01.01.2011)
  - Total: 3

Nõmme is a village in Lääneranna Parish, Pärnu County, in southwestern Estonia. It has only 3 inhabitants (as of 1 January 2011).

== Name ==
Nõmme was attested in historical sources as Nemme in 1725–1726 and Nömme in 1871. The name comes from the common noun nõmm (genitive: nõmme) 'heath, moor, moorland', referring to the local geography.

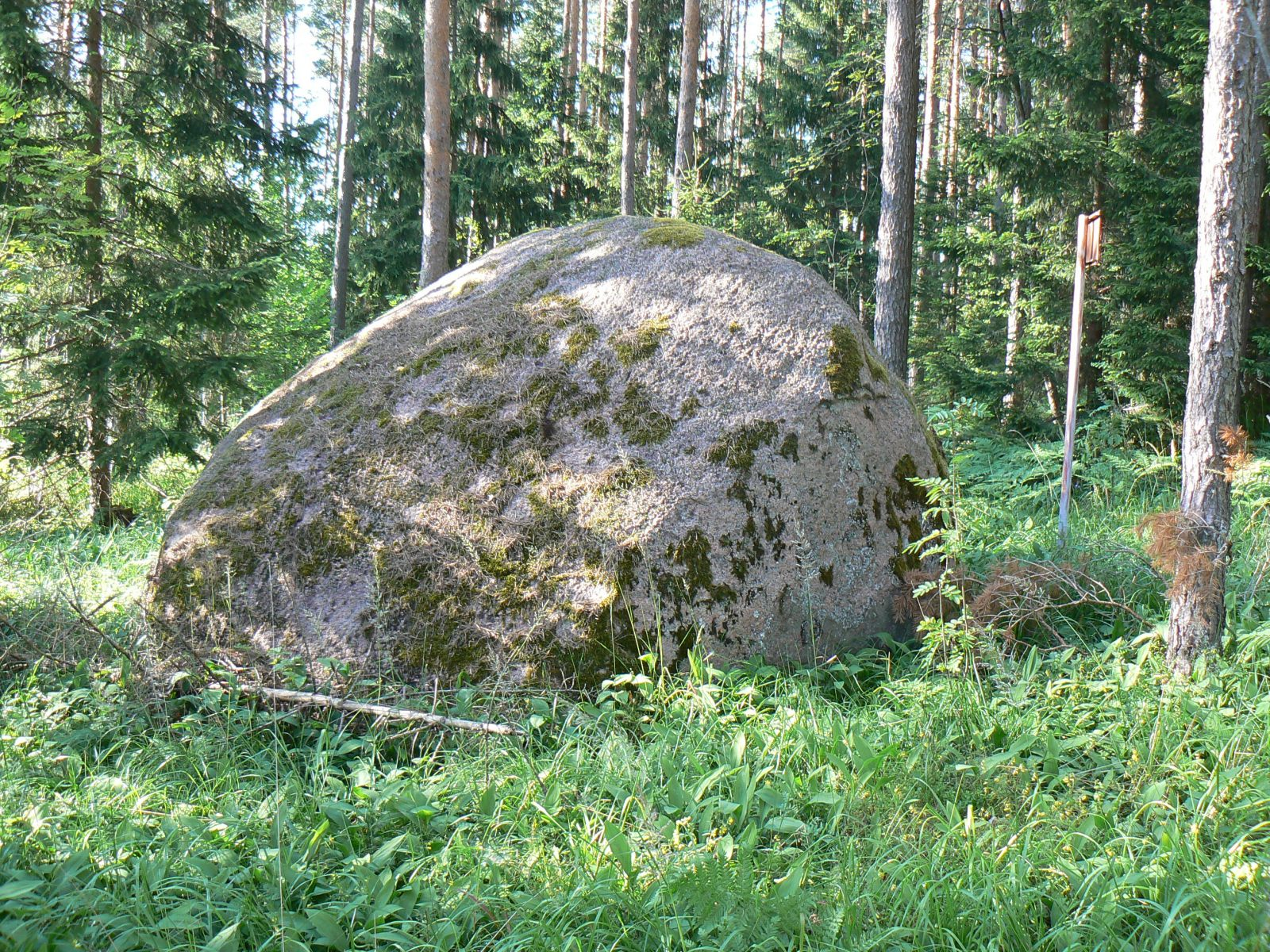
Glacial erratic in Nõmme
