= Saare, Pärnu County =

Village in Estonia

Saare
- village
- Location in Estonia
- Coordinates: 58°21′50″N 23°50′13″E
- Country: Estonia
- County: Pärnu County
- Municipality: Lääneranna Parish

Population (01.01.2011)
  - Total: 15
- Website: www.saulepi.planet.ee

Saare is a village in Lääneranna Parish, Pärnu County, in southwestern Estonia, on the coast of the Gulf of Riga. It has a population of 15 (as of 1 January 2011).
