= Raespa =

Village in Estonia

- village
- Location in Estonia
- Coordinates: 58°20′51″N 23°48′33″E
- Country: Estonia
- County: Pärnu County
- Municipality: Lääneranna Parish

Population (01.01.2011)
  - Total: 14
- Website: www.saulepi.planet.ee

Raespa is a village in Lääneranna Parish, Pärnu County, in southwestern Estonia, on the coast of the Gulf of Riga. It has a population of 14 (as of 1 January 2011).
