= Kinksi =

Village in Estonia

Coordinates: 58°37′N 23°42′E

- Village
- Interactive map of Kinksi
- Country: Estonia
- County: Pärnu County
- Parish: Lääneranna Parish
- Time zone: UTC+2 (EET)
  - Summer (DST): UTC+3 (EEST)

Kinksi is a village in Lääneranna Parish, Pärnu County, in western Estonia. Kinksi can be found inland of the Suur Strait. Kinski has a local timezone named Europe / Tallinn with an UTC offset of 2 hours and can be found 68 miles (or 109 km) south-west of Estonia's capital city Tallinn.

The following locations are considered of local significance: Komsi, Lihula, Varbla, Martna and Taebla. The main language spoken in Kinksi is Estonian, along with several southern dialects such as Võro, Mulgi and Tartu.
