= Saastna =

Village in Estonia

Coordinates: 58°43′N 23°35′E

- Village
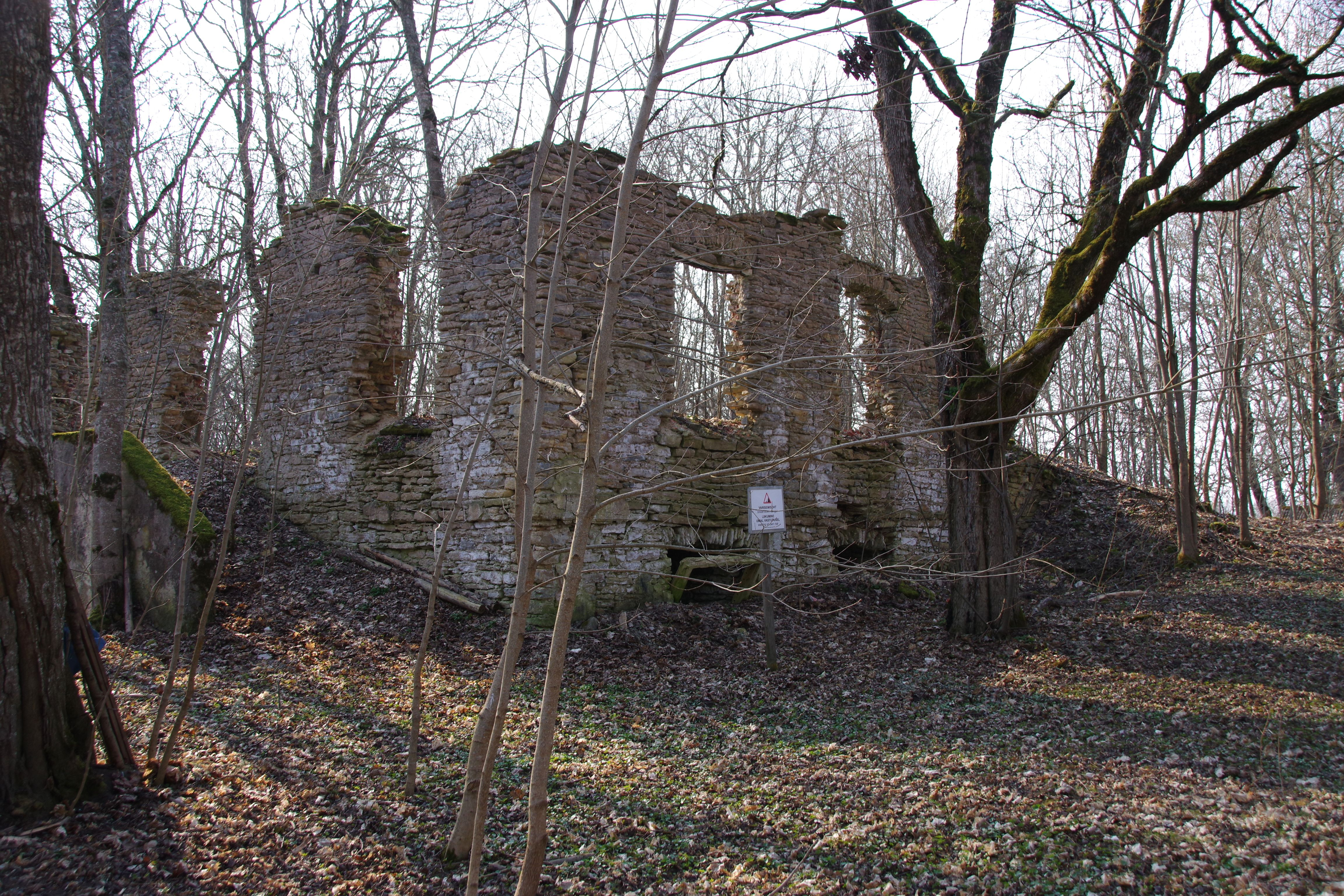
- Ruins of Saastna Manor
- Interactive map of Saastna
- Country: Estonia
- County: Pärnu County
- Parish: Lääneranna Parish
- Time zone: UTC+2 (EET)
  - Summer (DST): UTC+3 (EEST)

Saastna (German: Sastama) is a village in Lääneranna Parish, Pärnu County, in western Estonia. The village is located the Saastna Peninsula in Matsalu National Park.
