= Rooglaiu =

Village in Estonia

Coordinates: 58°42′21″N 23°30′58″E

- Village
- Interactive map of Rooglaiu
- Country: Estonia
- County: Pärnu County
- Parish: Lääneranna Parish
- Time zone: UTC+2 (EET)
  - Summer (DST): UTC+3 (EEST)

Rooglaiu (Rannaküla until 2017) is a village in Lääneranna Parish, Pärnu County, in western Estonia.
