= Valuste =

Village in Estonia

Coordinates: 58°40′15″N 23°49′07″E

- Village
- Interactive map of Valuste
- Country: Estonia
- County: Pärnu County
- Parish: Lääneranna Parish
- Time zone: UTC+2 (EET)
  - Summer (DST): UTC+3 (EEST)

Valuste is a village in Lääneranna Parish, Pärnu County, in western Estonia.
