= Rannaküla, Lääneranna Parish =

Village in Estonia

Rannaküla
- village
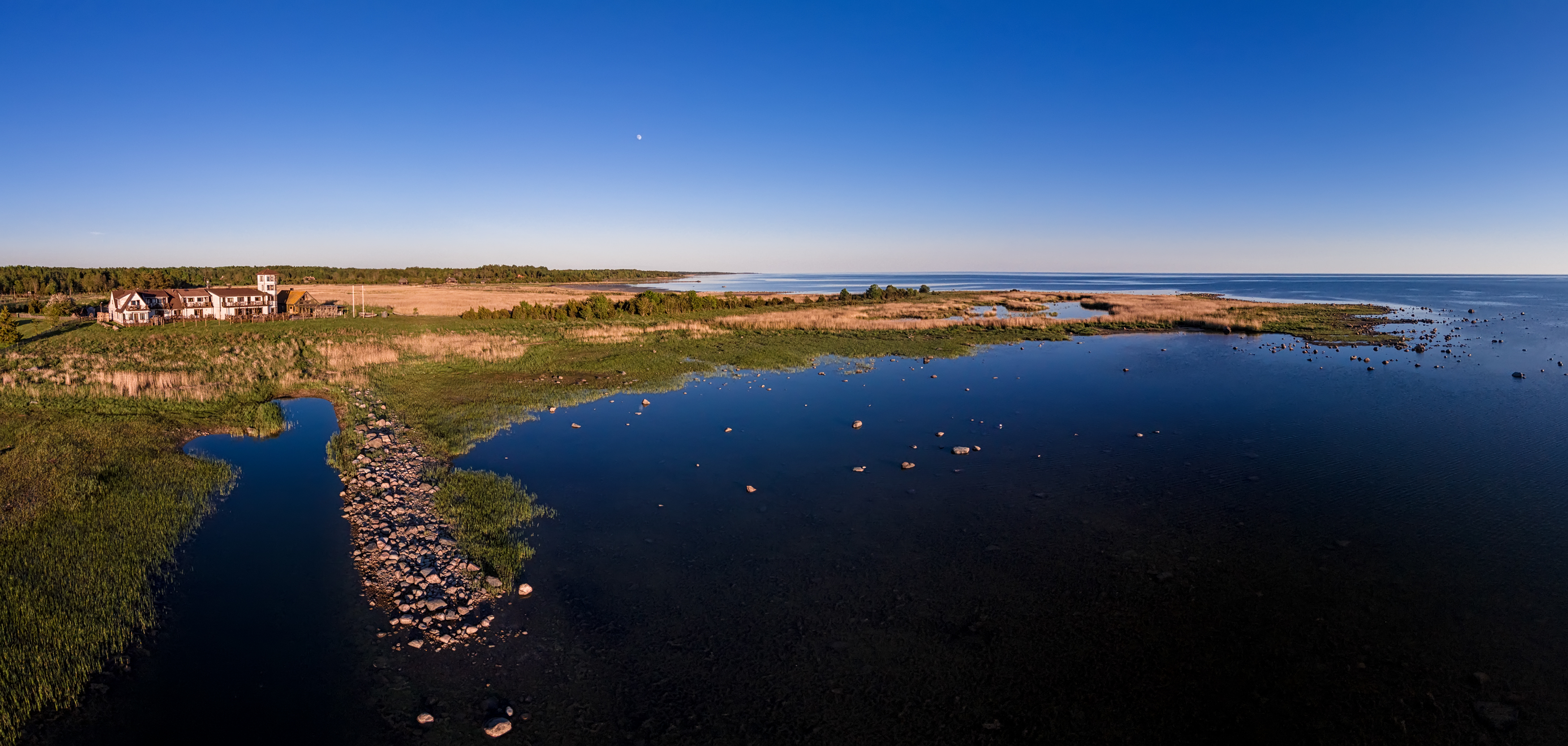
- Sea coast at Rannaküla with the Varbla Holiday Village resort in the background

- Location in Estonia
- Coordinates: 58°25′39″N 23°41′43″E
- Country: Estonia
- County: Pärnu County
- Municipality: Lääneranna Parish

Population (01.01.2011)
  - Total: 14

Rannaküla is a village in Lääneranna Parish, Pärnu County, in southwestern Estonia, on the coast of the Gulf of Riga. It has a population of 14 (as of 1 January 2011).
