= Maade =

Village in Estonia

- village
- Location in Estonia
- Coordinates: 58°23′05″N 23°50′25″E
- Country: Estonia
- County: Pärnu County
- Municipality: Lääneranna Parish

Population (01.01.2011)
  - Total: 8
- Website: www.saulepi.planet.ee

Maade is a village in Lääneranna Parish, Pärnu County, in southwestern Estonia. It has only 8 inhabitants (as of 1 January 2011).

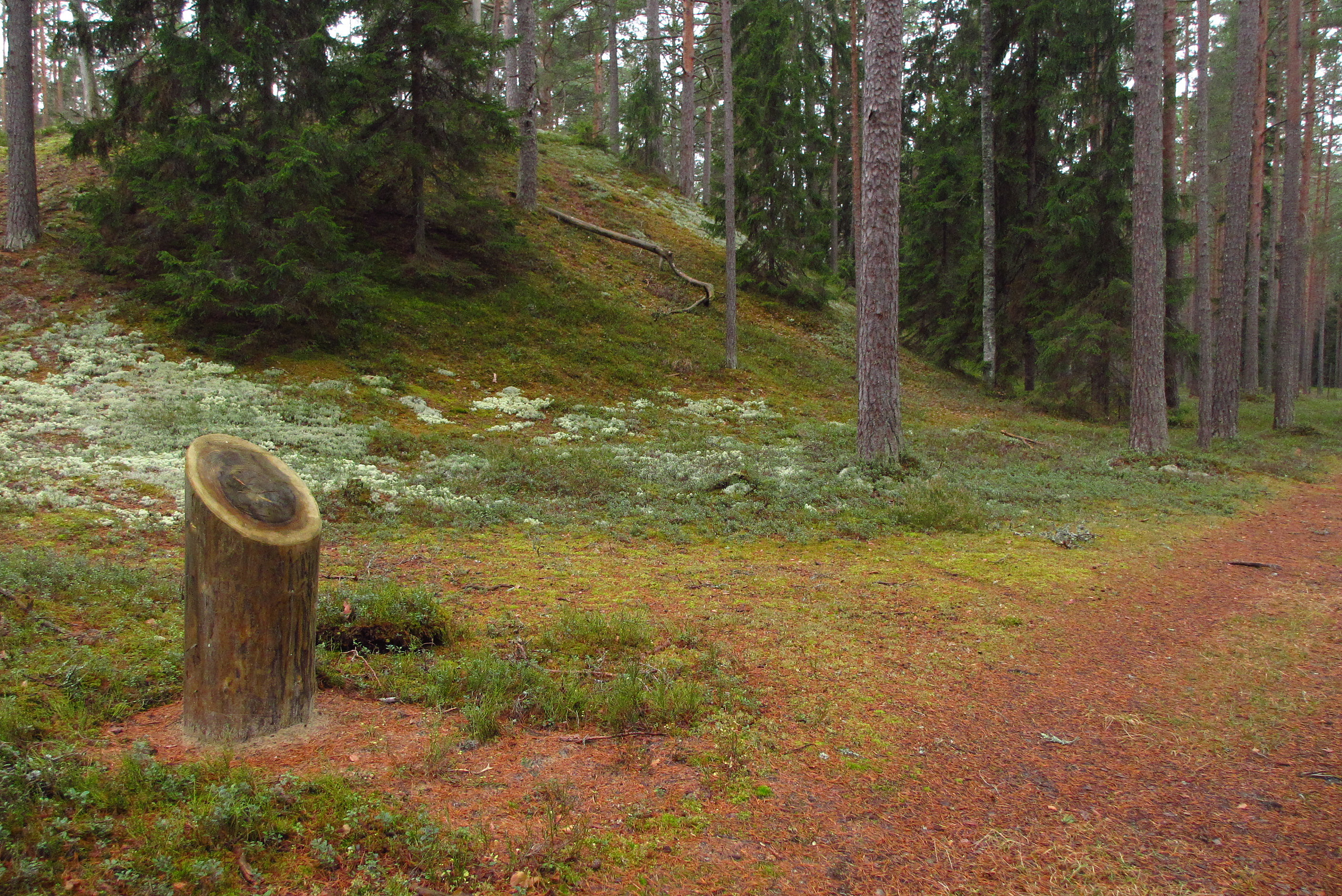
Overgrown dune in Kolga Bay Landscape Conservation Area in Maade.
