= Uluste =

Village in Estonia

- Village
- Location within Estonia
- Coordinates: 58.726666°N 24.070833°E
- Country: Estonia
- County: Pärnu County
- Parish: Lääneranna Parish
- Time zone: UTC+2 (EET)
  - Summer (DST): UTC+3 (EEST)

Uluste is a village in Lääneranna Parish, Pärnu County in Estonia.
