= Sookalda =

Village in Estonia

- village
- Location in Estonia
- Coordinates: 58°31′44″N 23°48′49″E
- Country: Estonia
- County: Pärnu County
- Municipality: Lääneranna Parish

Population (01.01.2011)
  - Total: 12

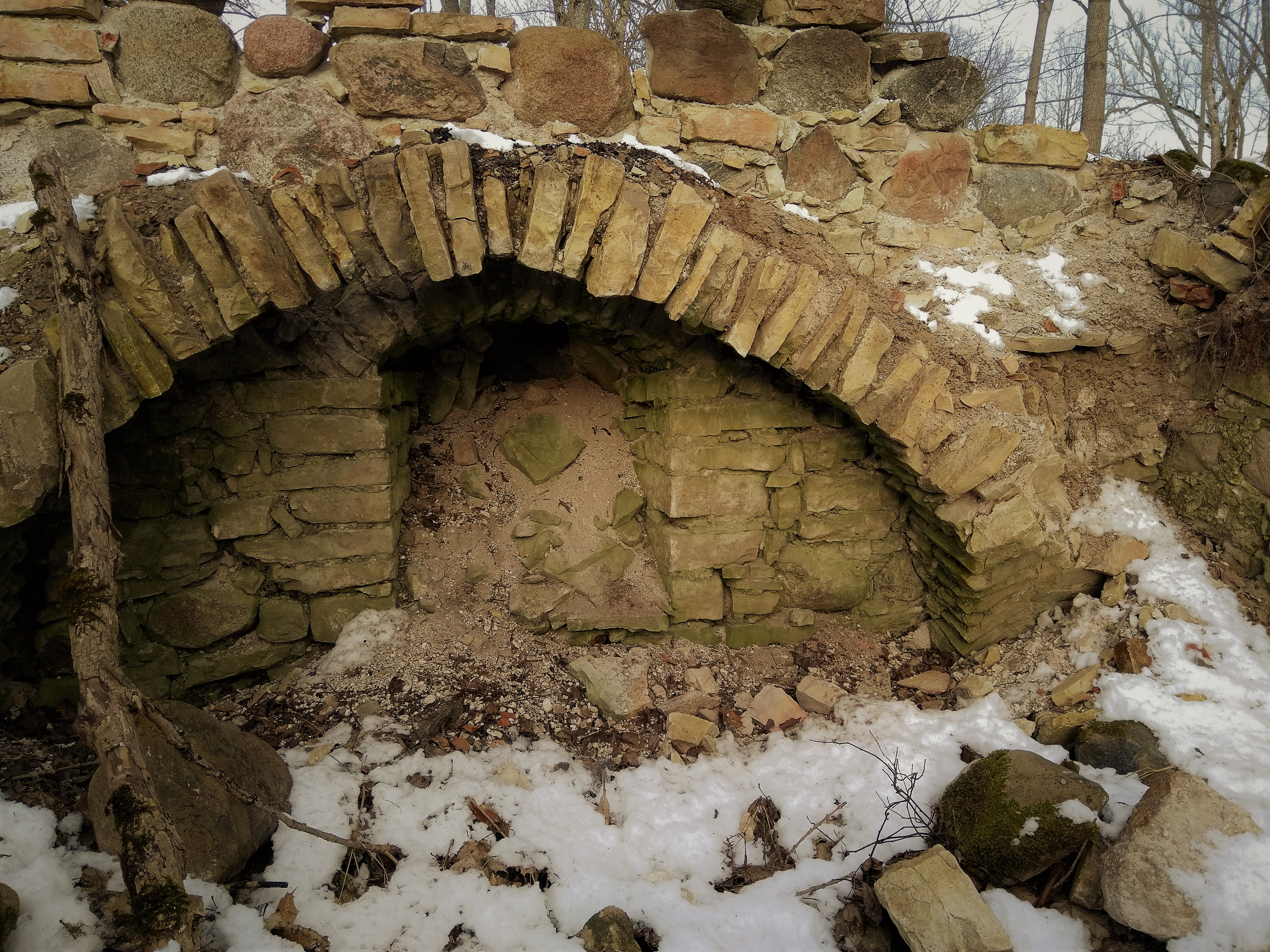
manor in Sookalda

Sookalda is a village in Lääneranna Parish, Pärnu County, in southwestern Estonia. It has a population of 12 (as of 1 January 2011).
