= Kanamardi =

Village in Estonia

- village
- Location in Estonia
- Coordinates: 58°28′16″N 23°56′27″E
- Country: Estonia
- County: Pärnu County
- Municipality: Lääneranna Parish

Population (12.31.2011)
  - Total: 7

Kanamardi is a village in Lääneranna Parish, Pärnu County, in southwestern Estonia, and has only 7 inhabitants (as of 31 December 2011).
