= Mõisaküla, Lääneranna Parish =

Village in Estonia

Mõisaküla
- Village
- Interactive map of Mõisaküla
- Coordinates: 58°40′28″N 23°32′43″E
- Country: Estonia
- County: Pärnu County
- Parish: Lääneranna Parish
- Time zone: UTC+2 (EET)
  - Summer (DST): UTC+3 (EEST)

Mõisaküla (German: Moisaküll) is a village in Lääneranna Parish, Pärnu County, in western Estonia.
