= Seli, Pärnu County =

Village in Estonia

- Village
- Location within Estonia
- Coordinates: 58.741665°N 23.858889°E
- Country: Estonia
- County: Pärnu County
- Parish: Lääneranna Parish
- Time zone: UTC+2 (EET)
  - Summer (DST): UTC+3 (EEST)

Seli is a village in Lääneranna Parish, Pärnu County in Estonia. Seli is well known for its industrial hot dog factory.
