= Ullaste =

Village in Estonia

Coordinates: 58°42′03″N 23°35′16″E

- Village
- Interactive map of Ullaste
- Country: Estonia
- County: Pärnu County
- Parish: Lääneranna Parish
- Time zone: UTC+2 (EET)
  - Summer (DST): UTC+3 (EEST)

Ullaste is a village in Lääneranna Parish, Pärnu County, in western Estonia.
