= Hälvati =

Village in Estonia

Coordinates: 58°42′N 23°52′E

- Village
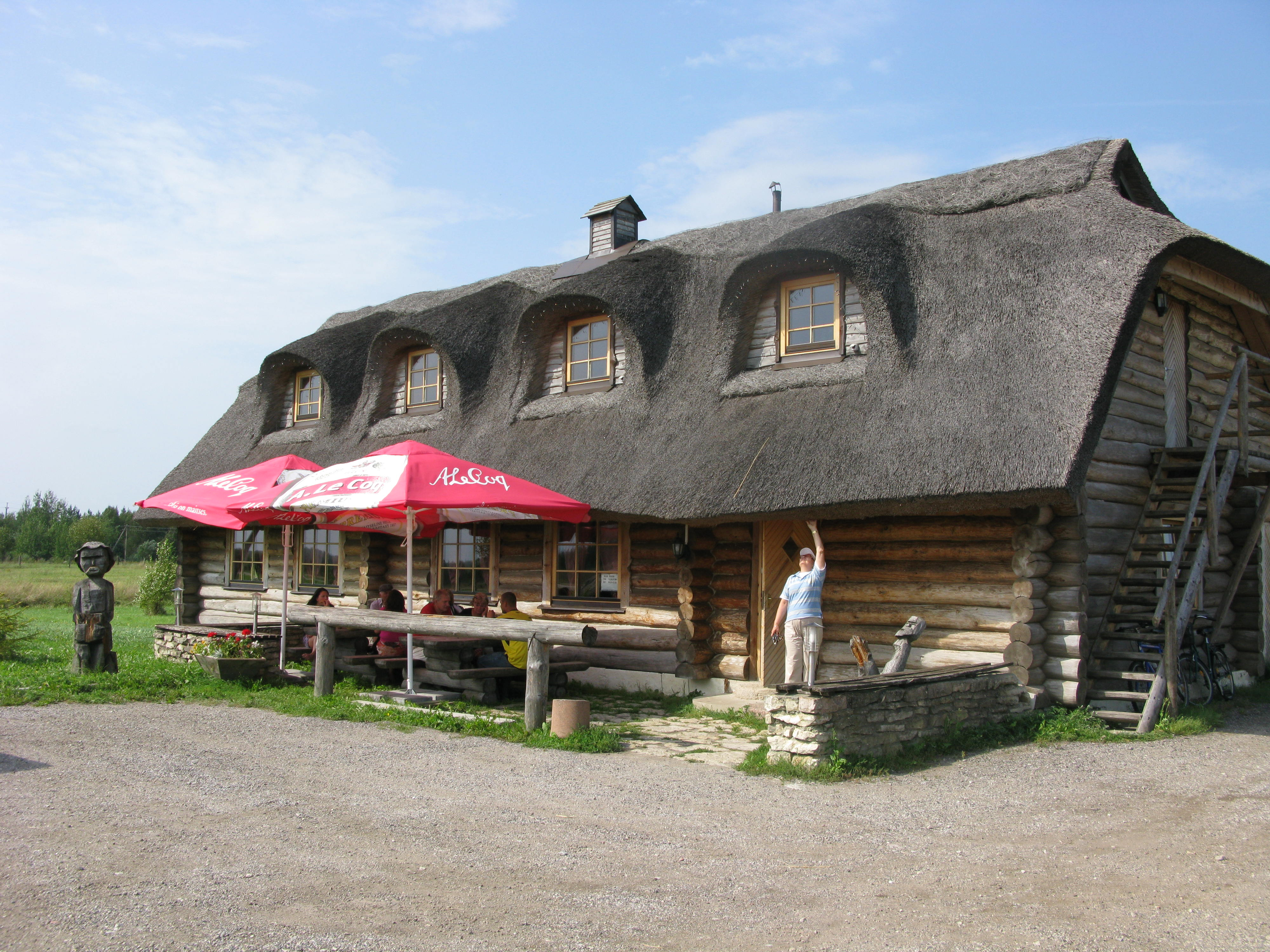
- Trahter Birgit restaurant in Hälvati
- Interactive map of Hälvati
- Country: Estonia
- County: Pärnu County
- Parish: Lääneranna Parish
- Time zone: UTC+2 (EET)
  - Summer (DST): UTC+3 (EEST)

Hälvati is a village in Lääneranna Parish, Pärnu County, in western Estonia.
