= Rame, Estonia =

Village in Estonia

Coordinates: 58°34′N 23°37′E

Rame
- Village
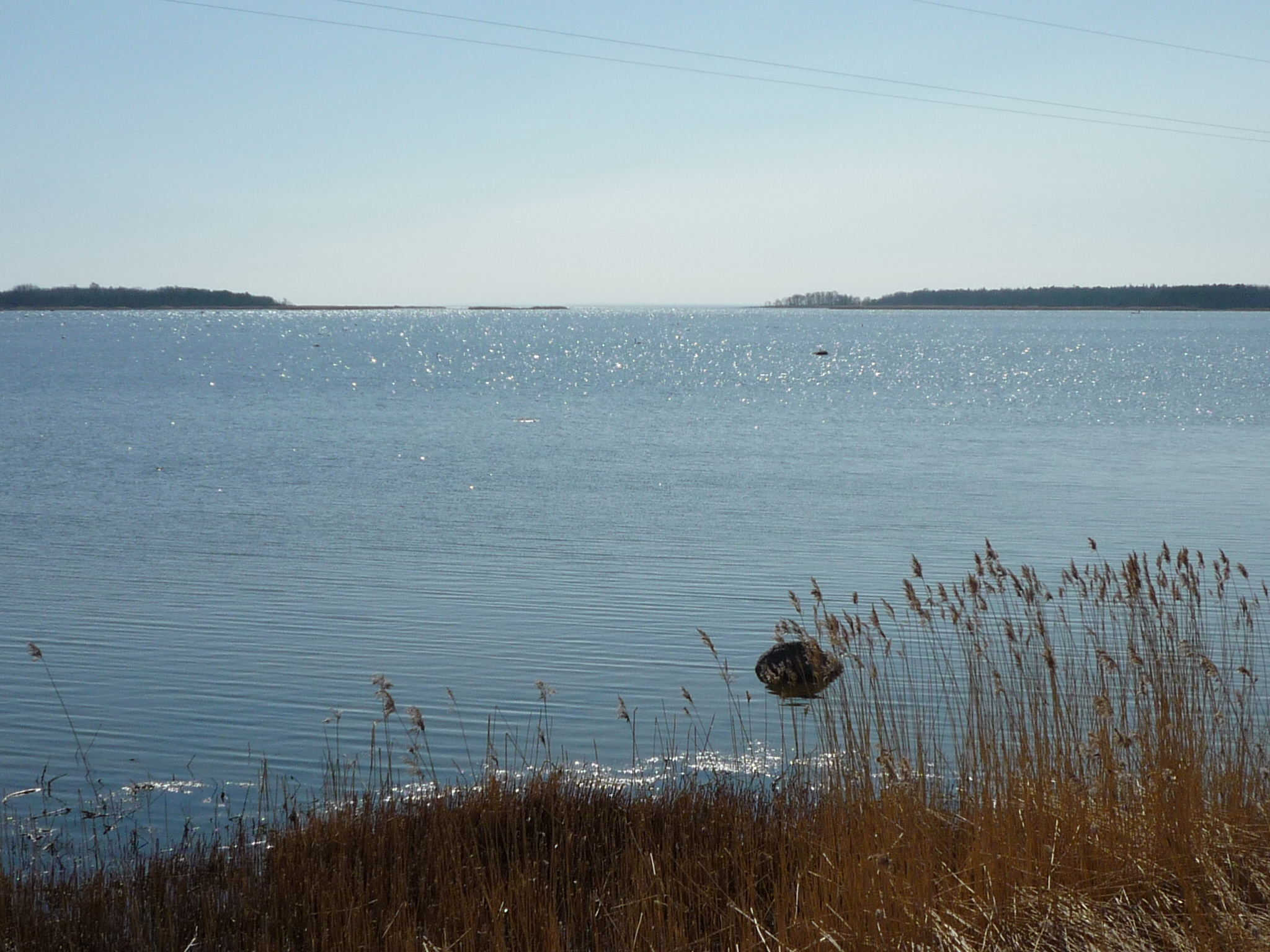
- Interactive map of Rame
- Country: Estonia
- County: Pärnu
- Parish: Lääneranna
- Time zone: UTC+2 (EET)
  - Summer (DST): UTC+3 (EEST)

Rame is a village in Lääneranna Parish, Pärnu County, in western Estonia.
