= Lääneranna Parish =

Municipality of Estonia

Lääneranna Parish Lääneranna vald
- Municipality of Estonia
- Flag Coat of arms

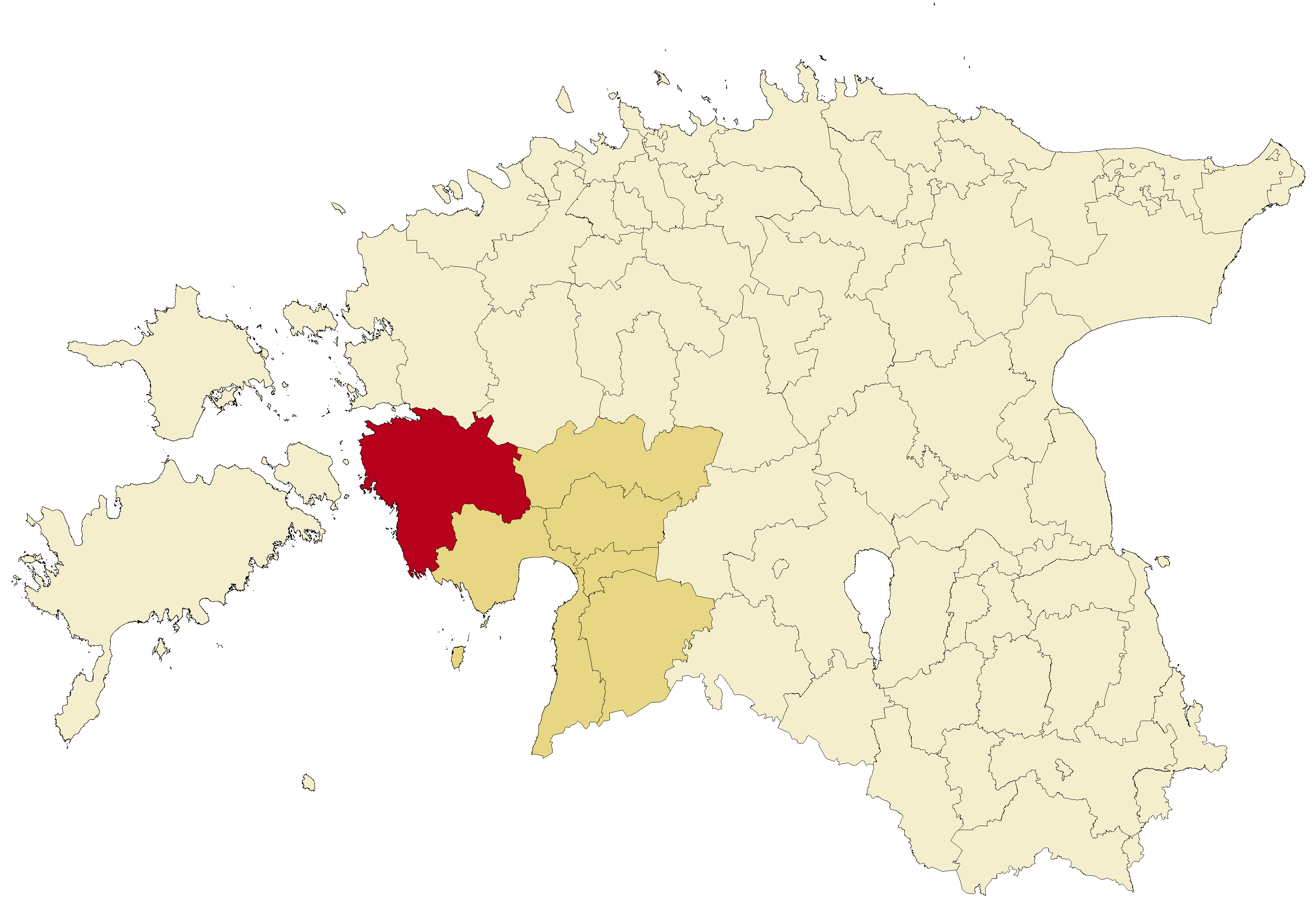
- Lääneranna Parish within Pärnu County.
- Country: Estonia
- County: Pärnu County
- Administrative centre: Lihula

Area
  - Total: 1,352 km^{2} (522 sq mi)

Population
  - Total: 5,494
  - Density: 4.064/km^{2} (10.52/sq mi)
- ISO 3166 code: EE-430
- Website: https://www.laanerannavald.ee/

Lääneranna Parish (Estonian: Lääneranna vald) is a rural municipality in Pärnu County. It includes the town of Lihula.

== Gallery ==
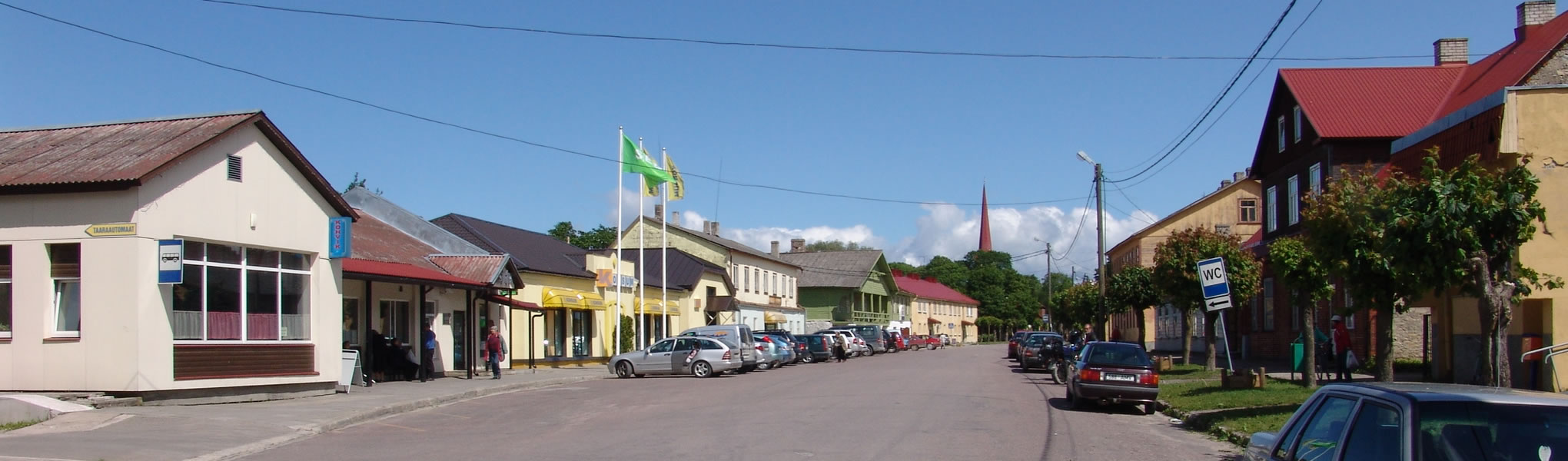
Lihula town

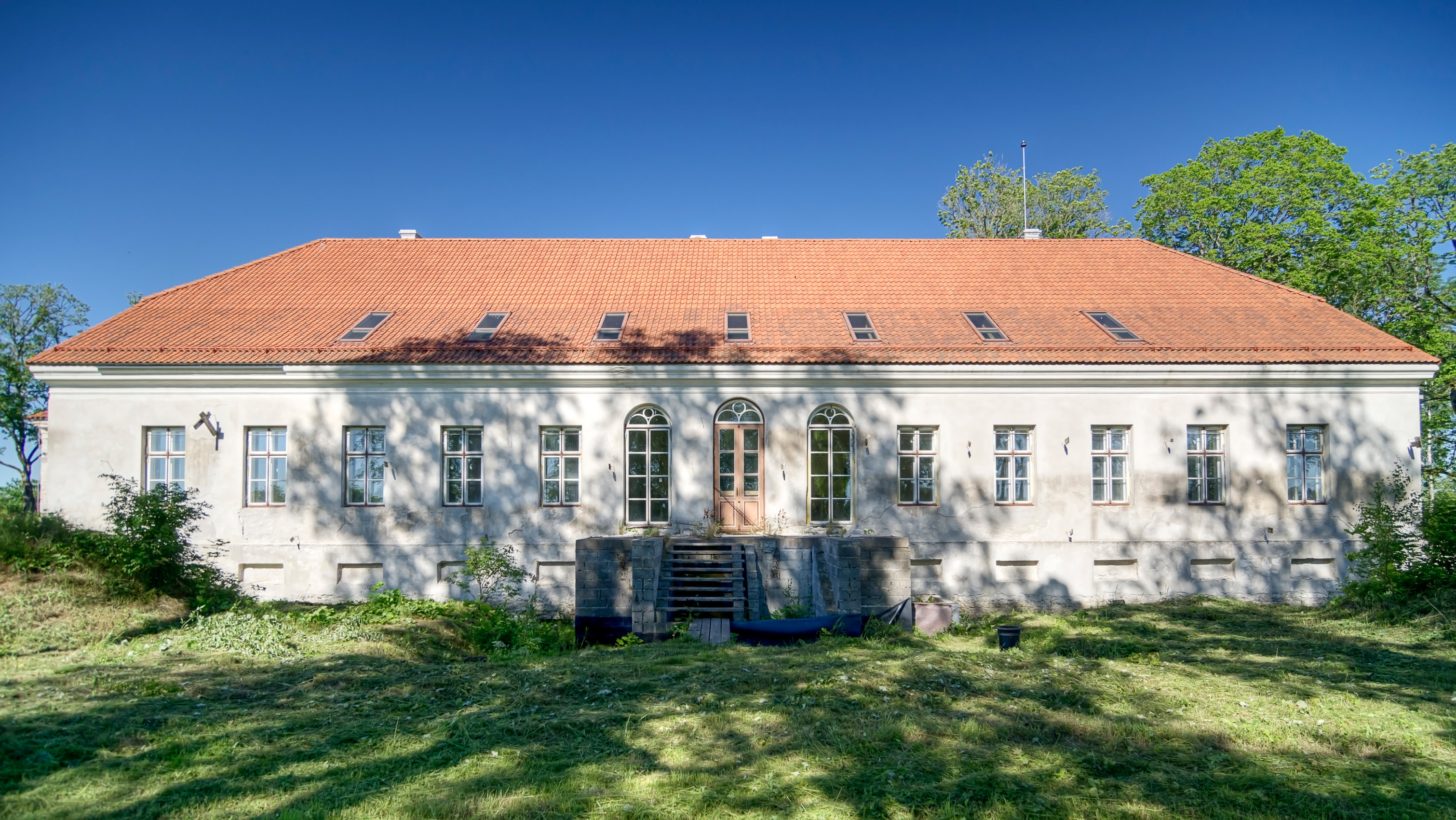
Kõima manor in Kõima village

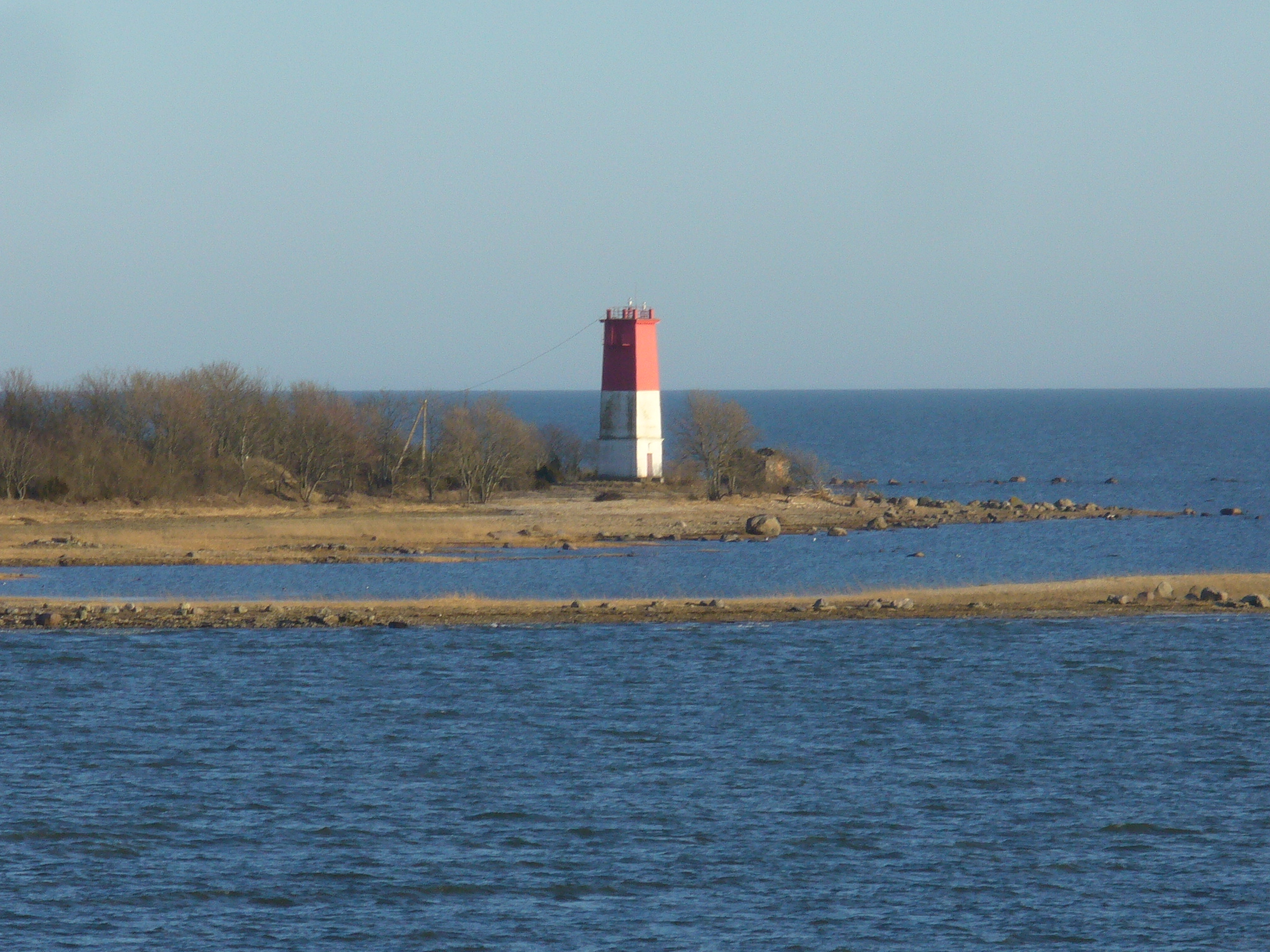
Lighthouse in Virtsu

== Settlements ==
Town

Lihula

Boroughs

Virtsu

Villages

There are 150 villages: Alaküla, Allika, Aruküla, Emmu, Esivere, Haapsi, Hanila, Helmküla, Hälvati, Hõbeda, Hõbesalu, Irta, Iska, Joonuse, Jänistvere, Järise, Järve, Jõeääre, Kadaka, Kalli, Kanamardi, Karinõmme, Karuba, Karuse, Kaseküla, Kause, Keemu, Kelu, Kibura, Kidise, Kiisamaa, Kilgi, Kinksi, Kirbla, Kirikuküla, Kiska, Kloostri, Koeri, Kokuta, Koonga, Korju, Kuhu, Kuke, Kulli, Kunila, Kurese, Käru, Kõera, Kõima, Audru Parish, Kõima, Lääneranna Parish, Kõmsi, Laulepa, Lautna, Linnuse, Liustemäe, Lõo, Lõpe, Maade, Maikse, Massu, Matsalu, Matsi, Meelva, Mereäärse, Metsküla, Mihkli, Muriste, Mäense, Mäliküla, Mõisaküla, Mõisimaa, Mõtsu, Naissoo, Nedrema, Nehatu, Nurme, Nurmsi, Nätsi, Nõmme, Oidrema, Paadrema, Paatsalu, Pagasi, Paimvere, Pajumaa, Palatu, Parasmaa, Parivere, Peanse, Peantse, Penijõe, Petaaluse, Piha, Piisu, Pikavere, Pivarootsi, Poanse, Rabavere, Raespa, Raheste, Rame, Rannaküla, Rannu, Rauksi, Ridase, Rooglaiu, Rootsi, Rootsi-Aruküla, Rumba, Rädi, Saare, Saastna, Salavere, Salevere, Saulepi, Seira, Seli, Selja, Sookalda, Sookatse, Soovälja, Tamba, Tamme, Tarva, Tiilima, Tuhu, Tuudi, Täpsi, Tõitse, Tõusi, Ullaste, Uluste, Ura, Urita, Vagivere, Vaiste, Valuste, Vanamõisa, Varbla, Vastaba, Vatla, Veltsa, Voose, Võhma, Võigaste, Võitra, Võrungi, Äila, Ännikse, Õepa, Õhu.

== Religion ==
According to the census, 8.7 per cent of the population in the municipality aged at least fifteen identified themselves as Lutherans, 0.9 per cent as Pentecostal, 0.5 per cent as Orthodox, 0.5 per cent as others Christians. 1.3 per cent of respondents said they followed other religions. 86.3 per cent of the residents said they were religiously unaffiliated. The affiliation of 1.8 per cent was unknown.

== Notable people ==
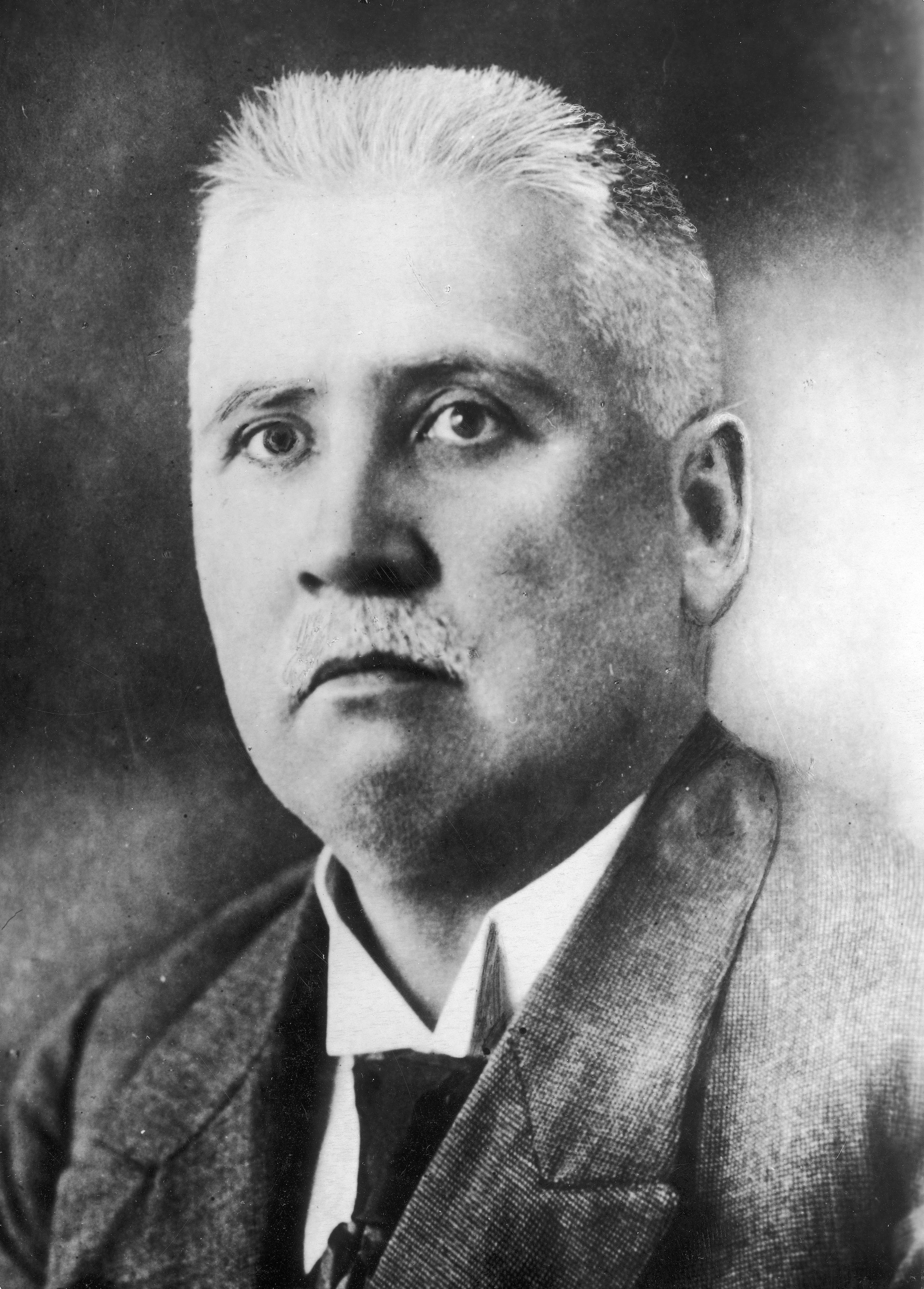
Jaan Teemant, 1932

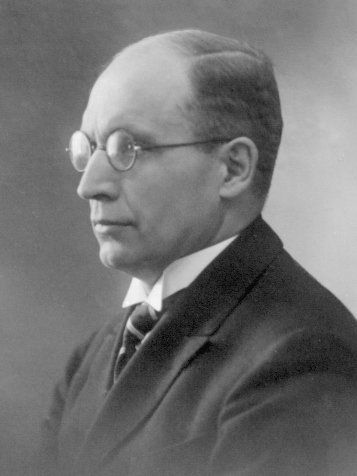
Jüri Uluots, ca. 1930

- Eduard Georg von Wahl (1833 in Vatla – 1890), a Baltic German surgeon in Tartu
- Gregor von Bochmann (1850 in Nehatu – 1930), a Baltic German landscape and genre painter.
- Wilhelm Petersen (1854 in Lihula – 1933), a Baltic German entomologist and lepidopterist.
- Jakob Johann von Uexküll (1864 in Mihkli – 1944), a Baltic German biologist, he worked on muscular physiology, animal behaviour and biosemiotics
- Jaan Teemant (1872 in Paatsalu – 1941), lawyer, politician, State Elder of Estonia, 1925 – 1927 & 1932.
- Alexander Baron Engelhardt (1885 in Alaküla – 1960), a Baltic German physician and medical historian.
- Jüri Uluots (1890 in Kirbla – 1945), journalist, attorney and Prime Minister of Estonia, 1939-1940
- Ado Anderkopp (1894 in Hanila – 1941), politician, journalist and sports organiser; Minister of War, 1923–1924 & Minister of the Interior and Minister of Justice, 1930–1933
- Karl Ristikivi (1912 in Varbla – 1977), writer of historical novels.
- Eerik Kumari (1912 in Kirbla – 1984), biologist and ornithologist, president of the Estonian Naturalists' Society, 1954 to 1964.
- Harri Jõgisalu (1922 in Korju – 2014), children's writer, mainly about nature and traditional rural life.
- Tarmo Loodus (born 1958 in Lihula), educator and politician, Mayor of Viljandi, 1999 to 2002 & Minister of the Interior, 1999 – 2002.
- Toomas Kivimägi (born 1963 in Lihula), politician and lawyer, the Mayor of Pärnu, 2009 to 2015.

=== Sport ===
- Mihkel Müller (1887 in Paadrema – 1970), Greco-Roman middleweight wrestler at the 1920 Summer Olympics
- Roman Steinberg (1900 in Massu – 1939), a middleweight, Greco-Roman wrestling bronze medallist at the 1924 Summer Olympics
- August Kukk (1908 in Kirbla – 1988), men's freestyle welterweight wrestler at the 1936 Summer Olympics
- Kristjan Palusalu 1908 in Matsi – 1987), heavyweight wrestler and gold medallist at the 1936 Summer Olympics
