= Kiska, Estonia =

Village in Estonia

Coordinates: 58°34′N 23°48′E

Kiska
- Village
- Interactive map of Kiska
- Country: Estonia
- County: Pärnu County
- Parish: Lääneranna Parish
- Time zone: UTC+2 (EET)
  - Summer (DST): UTC+3 (EEST)

Kiska is a village in Lääneranna Parish, Pärnu County, in western Estonia.
