= Kulli, Pärnu County =

Village in Pärnu County, Estonia

Kulli
- village
- Location in Estonia
- Coordinates: 58°22′23″N 23°48′02″E
- Country: Estonia
- County: Pärnu County
- Municipality: Lääneranna Parish

Population (01.01.2011)
  - Total: 58
- Website: www.saulepi.planet.ee

Kulli is a village in Lääneranna Parish, Pärnu County, in southwestern Estonia. It has a population of 58 (as of 1 January 2011).
