= Allika, Pärnu County =

Village in Estonia

Allika
- village
- Location in Estonia
- Coordinates: 58°27′54″N 23°44′04″E
- Country: Estonia
- County: Pärnu County
- Municipality: Lääneranna Parish

Population (01.01.2011)
  - Total: 14

Allika is a village in Lääneranna Parish, Pärnu County, in southwestern Estonia. It has a population of 14 (as of 1 January 2011).
