= Kadaka, Pärnu County =

Village in Estonia

Kadaka
- village
- Location in Estonia
- Coordinates: 58°26′37″N 23°41′41″E
- Country: Estonia
- County: Pärnu County
- Municipality: Lääneranna Parish

Population (01.01.2011)
  - Total: 7

Kadaka is a village in Lääneranna Parish, Pärnu County, in southwestern Estonia, on the coast of the Gulf of Riga. It has only 7 inhabitants (as of 1 January 2011).

Small islet of Kuralaid, which is located about 700 m (2,300 ft) off the coast, also belongs to Kadaka village.
