= Raheste =

Village in Estonia

- village
- Location in Estonia
- Coordinates: 58°25′35″N 23°45′20″E
- Country: Estonia
- County: Pärnu County
- Municipality: Lääneranna Parish

Population (01.01.2011)
  - Total: 45

Raheste is a village in Lääneranna Parish, Pärnu County, in southwestern Estonia. It has a population of 45 (as of 1 January 2011).
