= Tiilima =

Village in Estonia

- village
- Location in Estonia
- Coordinates: 58°31′02″N 23°54′29″E
- Country: Estonia
- County: Pärnu County
- Municipality: Lääneranna Parish

Population (31.12.2021)
  - Total: 3

Tiilima is a village in Lääneranna Parish, Pärnu County, in southwestern Estonia. It has only 3 inhabitants (as of 31 December 2021).
