= Tuudi =

Village in Estonia

Coordinates: 58°40′N 23°45′E

- Village
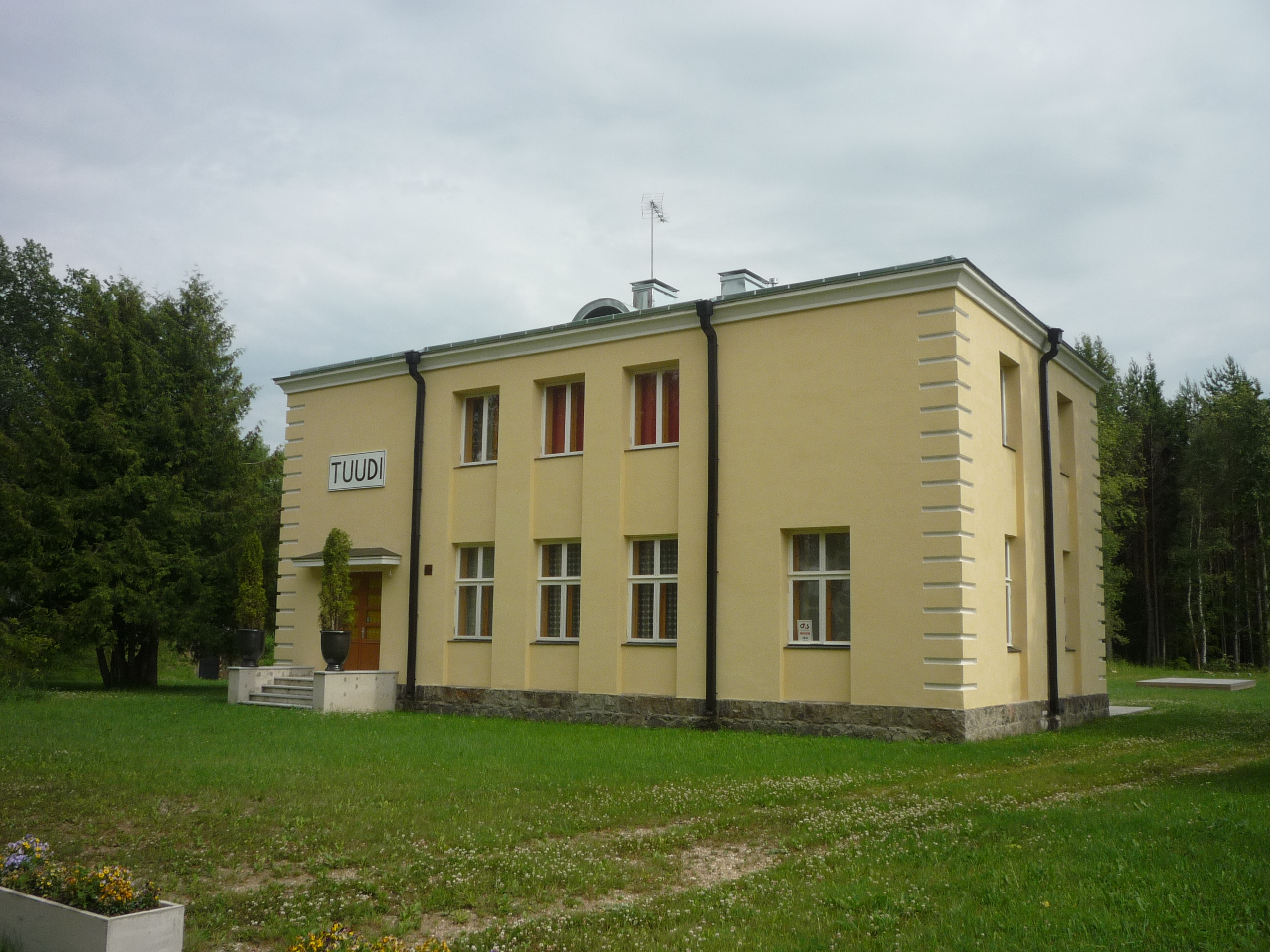
- Former Tuudi railway station.
- Interactive map of Tuudi
- Country: Estonia
- County: Pärnu County
- Parish: Lääneranna Parish
- Time zone: UTC+2 (EET)
  - Summer (DST): UTC+3 (EEST)

Tuudi (German: Tuttomäggi) is a village in Lääneranna Parish, Pärnu County, in western Estonia.

== Gallery ==
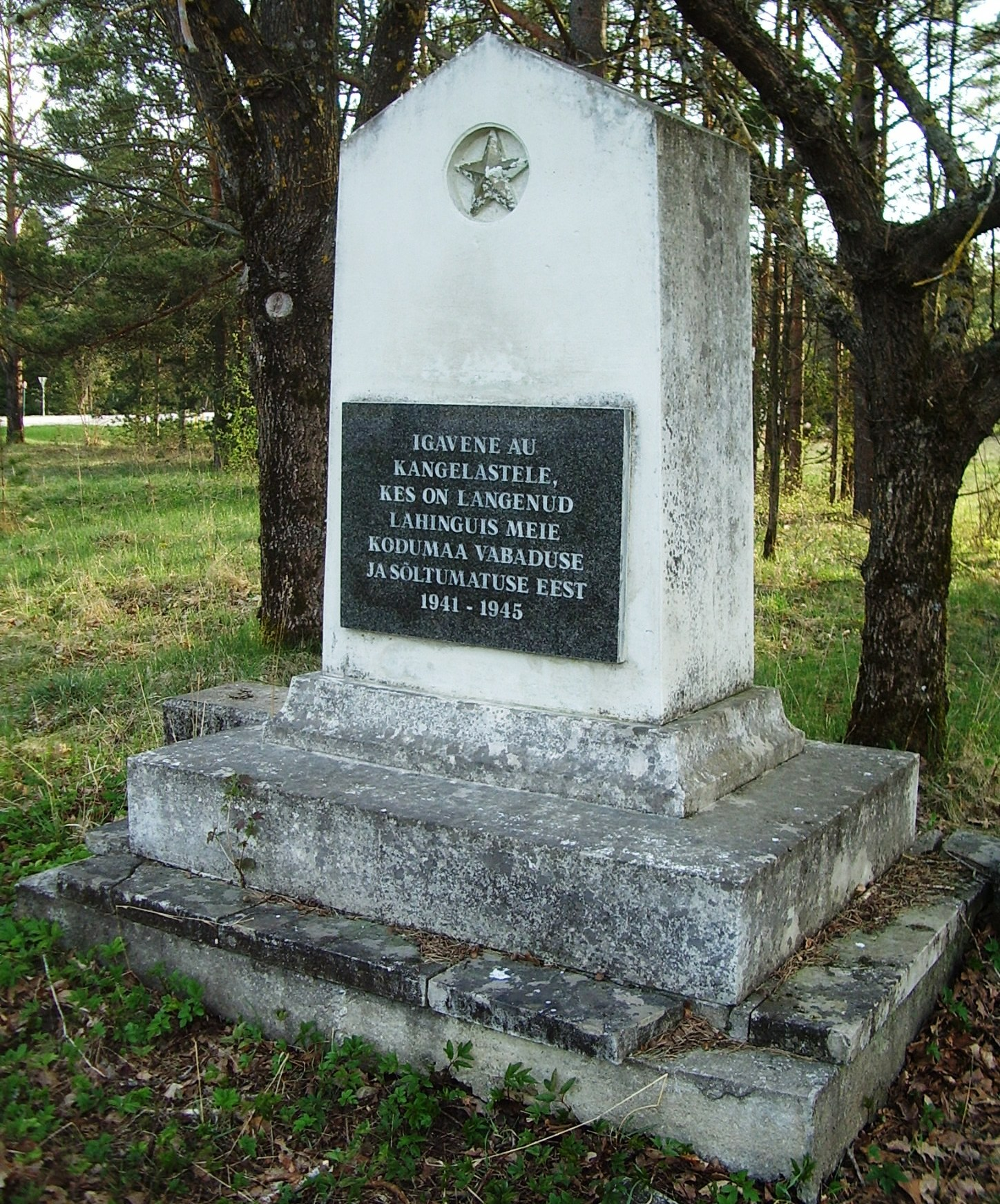
World War II memorial stone in Tuudi.

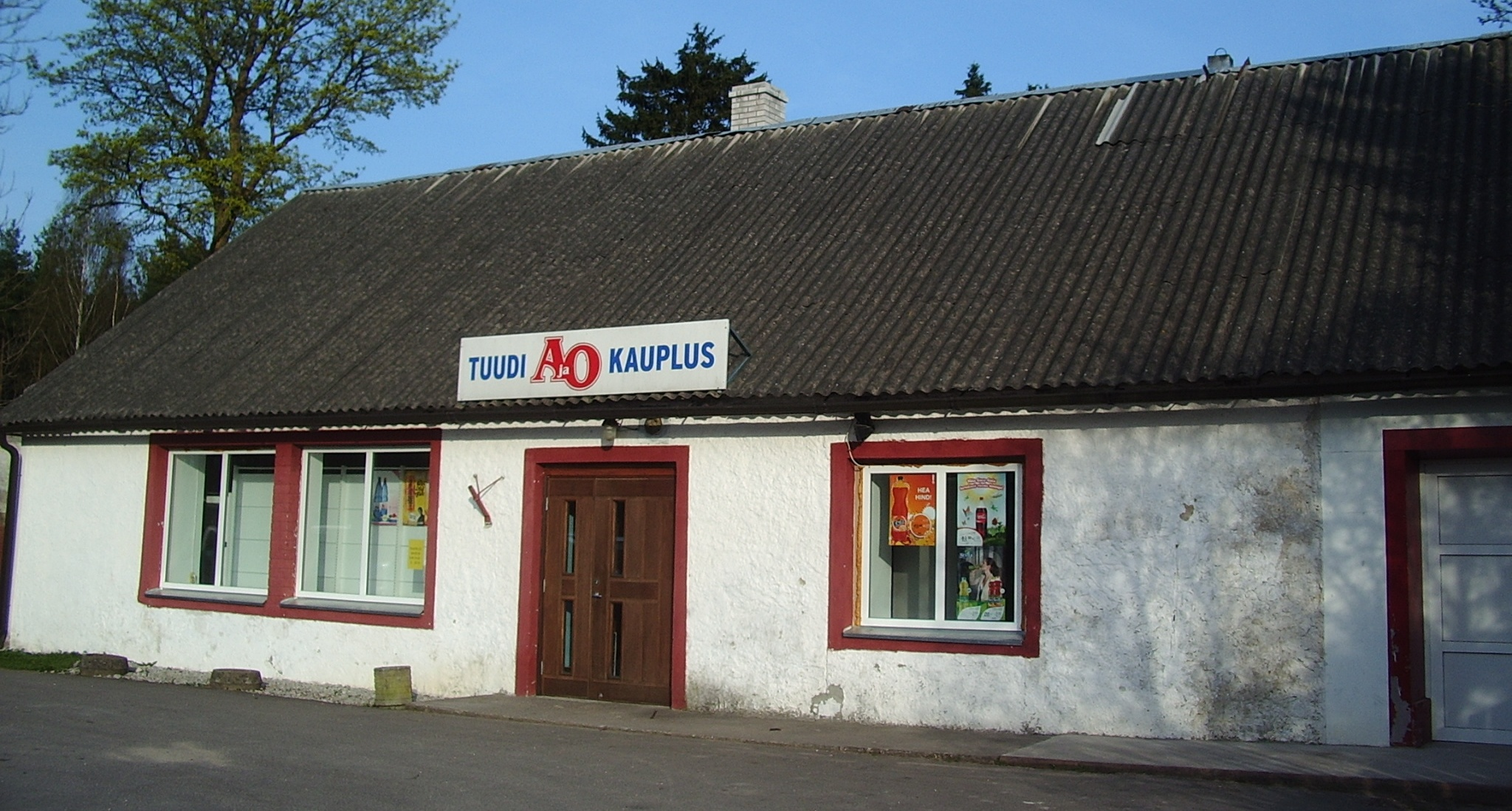
Local grocery store in Tuudi.

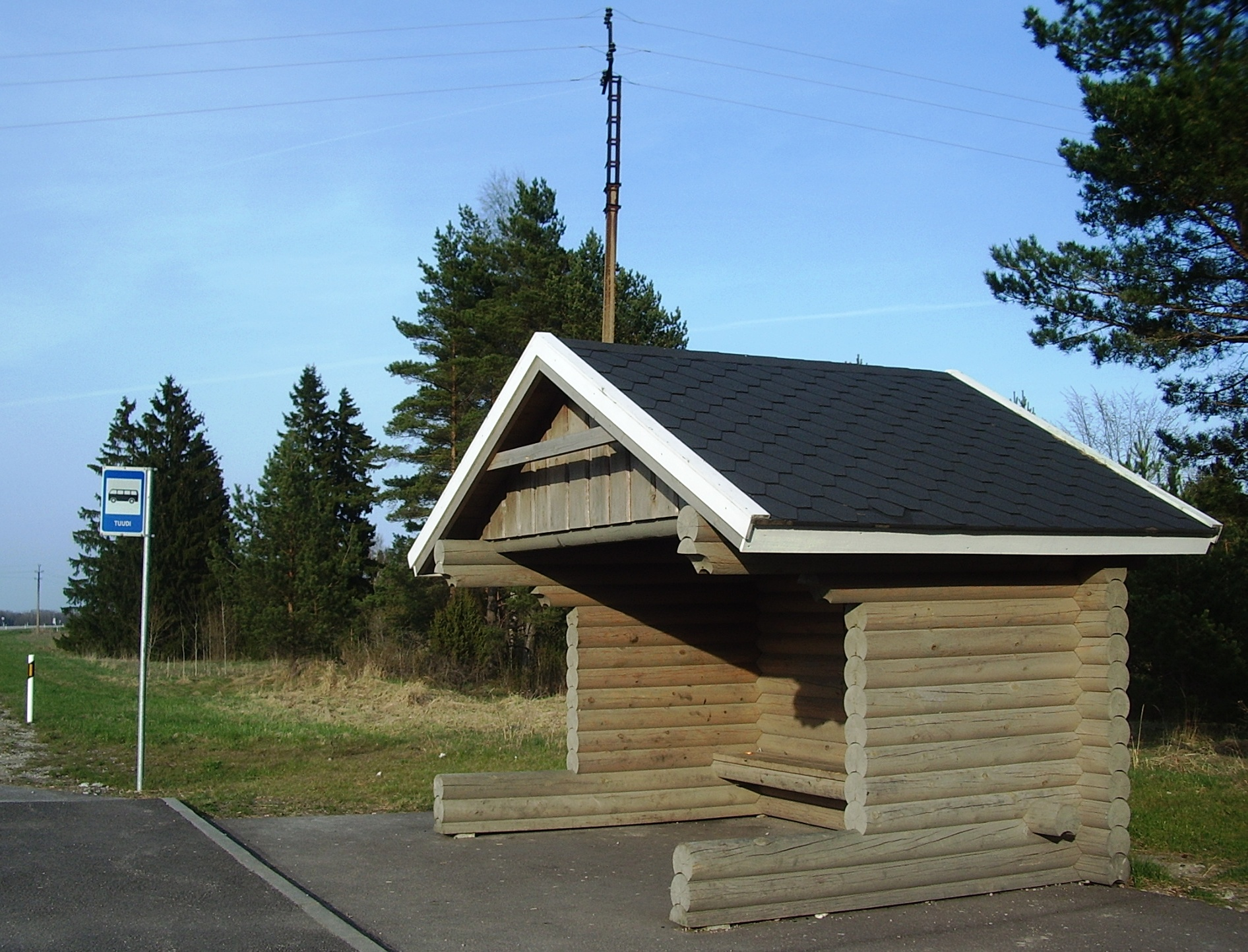
Tuudi bus stop.

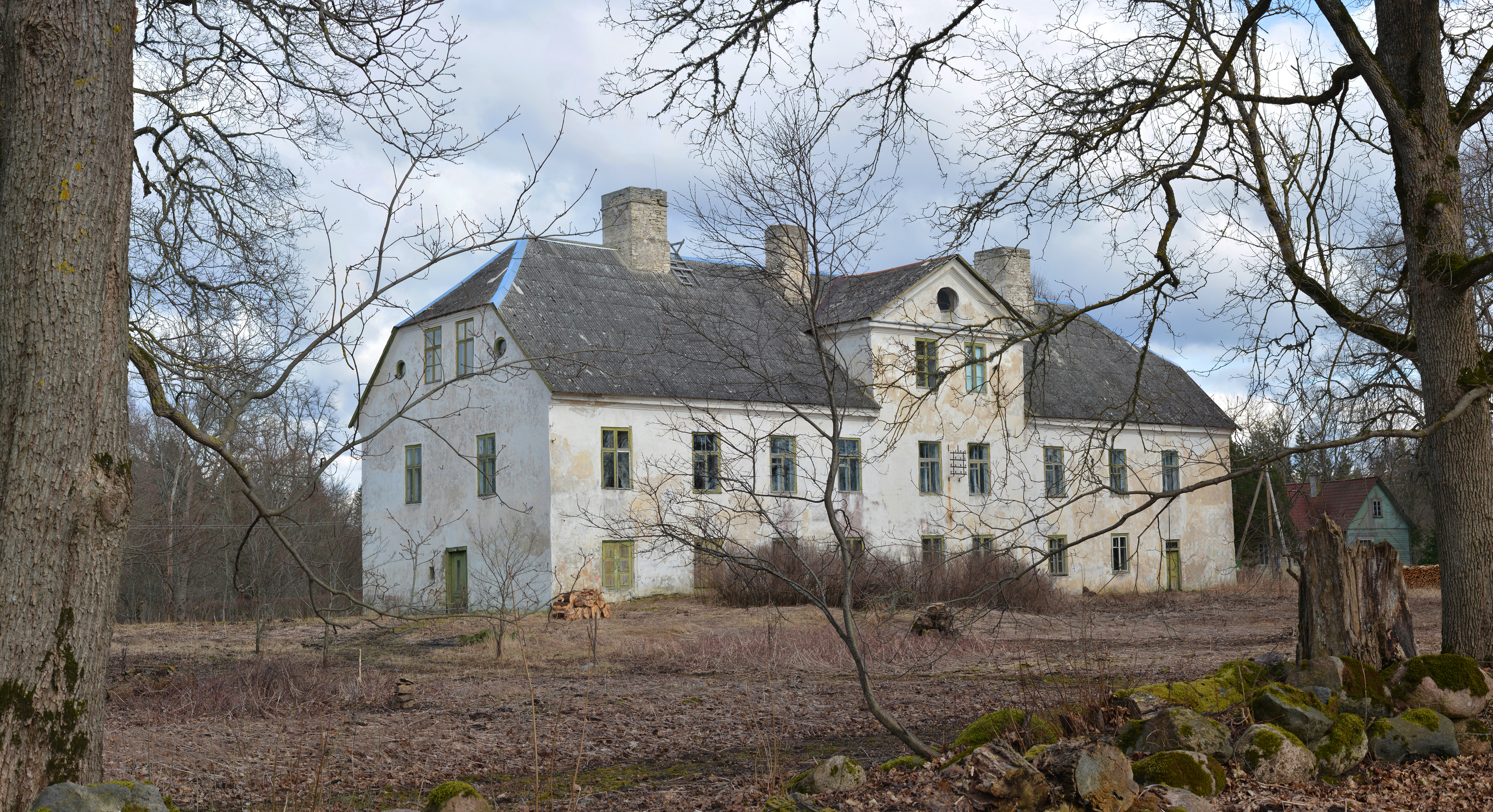
Tuudi manor house.
