= Parivere =

Village in Estonia

Coordinates: 58°40′N 23°51′E

- Village
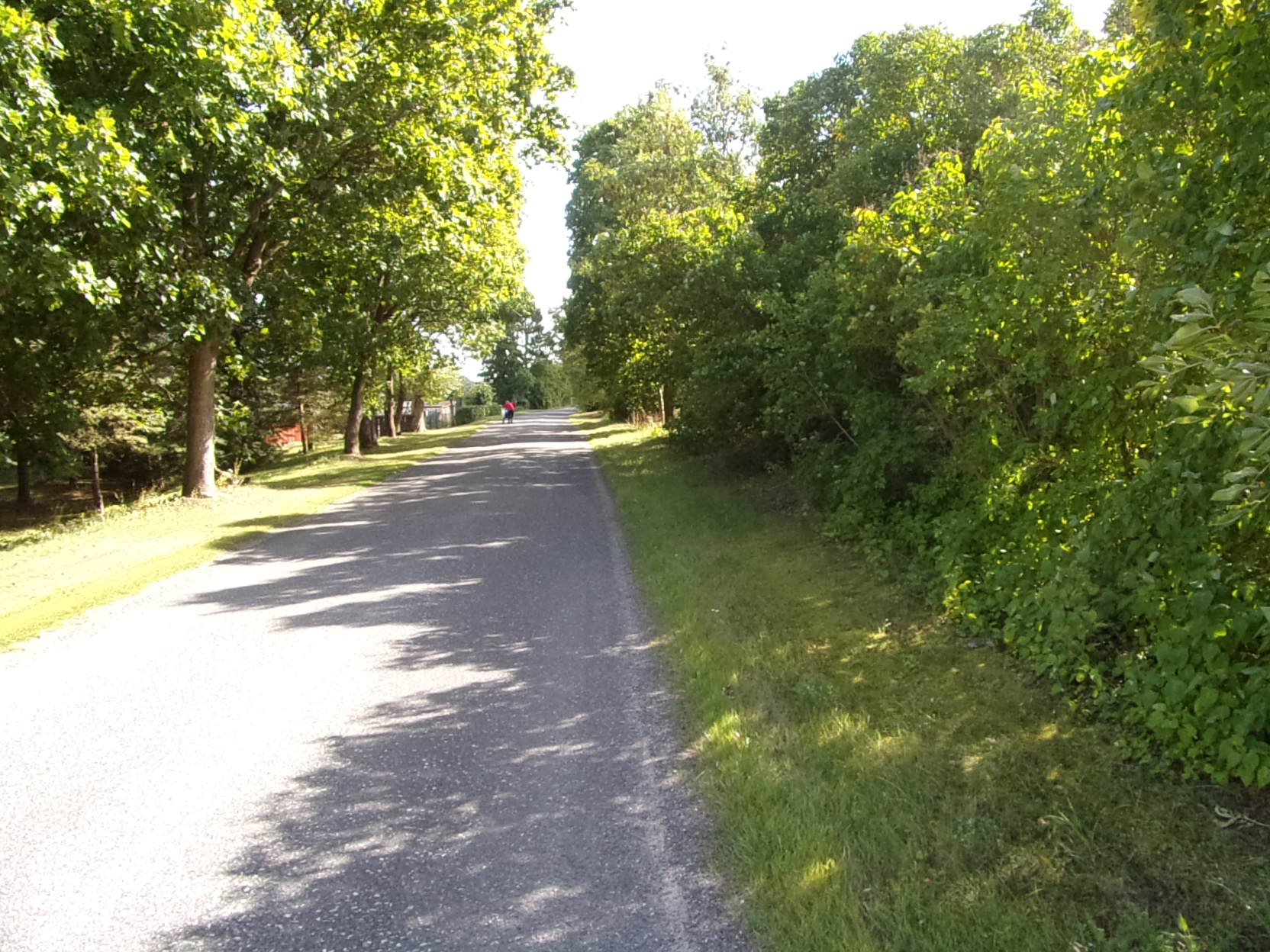
- Interactive map of Parivere
- Country: Estonia
- County: Pärnu County
- Parish: Lääneranna Parish
- Time zone: UTC+2 (EET)
  - Summer (DST): UTC+3 (EEST)

Parivere is a village in Lääneranna Parish, Pärnu County, in western Estonia.
