= Kause =

Village in Estonia

Coordinates: 58°37′N 23°39′E

- Village
- Interactive map of Kause
- Country: Estonia
- County: Pärnu County
- Parish: Lääneranna Parish
- Time zone: UTC+2 (EET)
  - Summer (DST): UTC+3 (EEST)

Kause is a village in Lääneranna Parish, Pärnu County, in western Estonia.
