= Helmküla =

Village in Estonia

- village
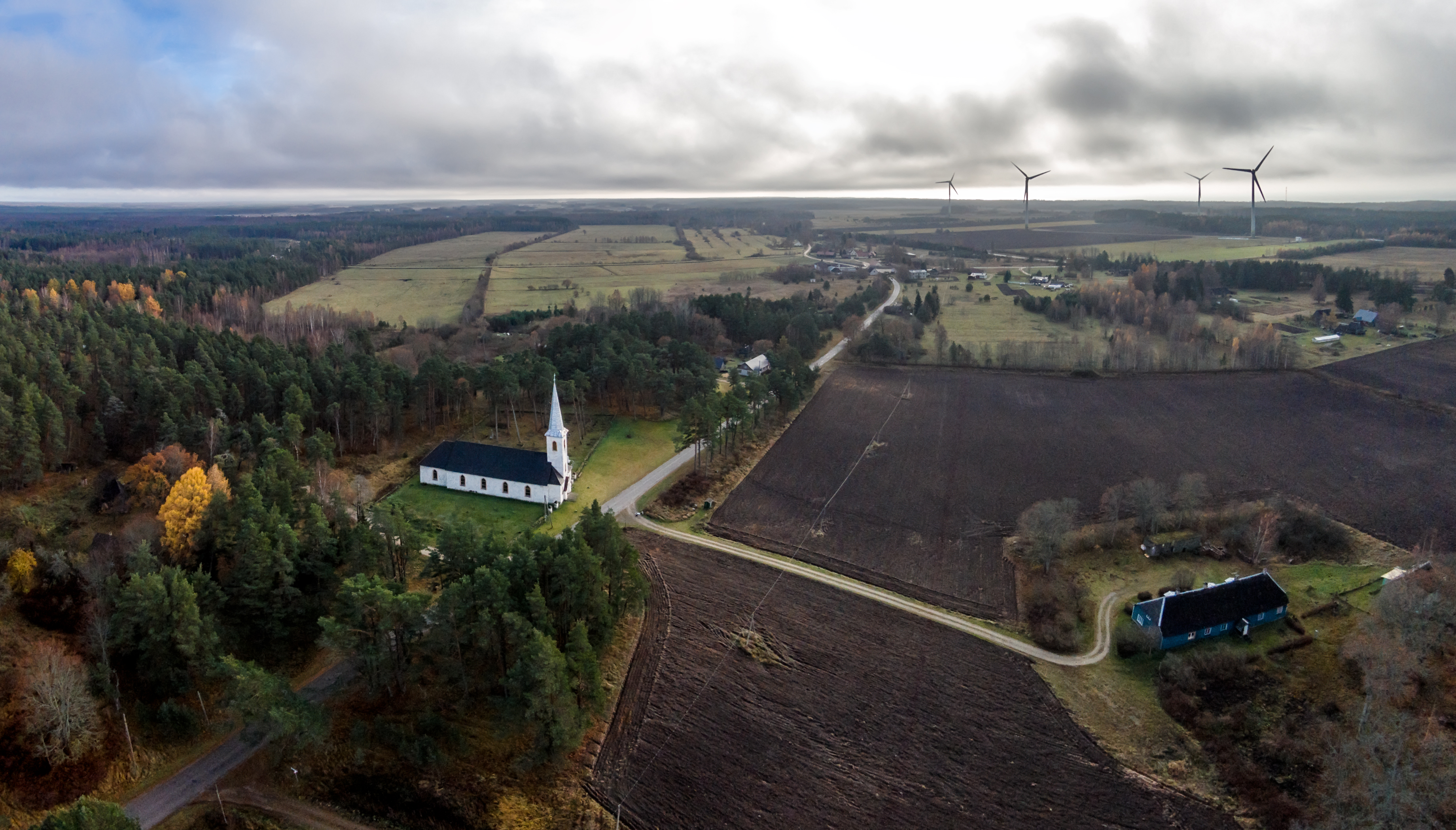

- Location in Estonia
- Coordinates: 58°27′03″N 23°44′45″E
- Country: Estonia
- County: Pärnu County
- Municipality: Lääneranna Parish

Population (01.01.2011)
  - Total: 43

Helmküla is a village in Lääneranna Parish, Pärnu County, in southwestern Estonia. It has a population of 43 (as of 1 January 2011).
