= Selja, Lääneranna Parish =

Village in Estonia

Selja
- village
- Location in Estonia
- Coordinates: 58°23′57″N 23°45′40″E
- Country: Estonia
- County: Pärnu County
- Municipality: Lääneranna Parish

Population (01.01.2011)
  - Total: 14

Selja is a village in Lääneranna Parish, Pärnu County, in southwestern Estonia. It has a population of 14 (as of 1 January 2011).
