= Käru, Pärnu County =

Village in Estonia

Käru
- village
- Location in Estonia
- Coordinates: 58°32′58″N 23°53′23″E
- Country: Estonia
- County: Pärnu County
- Municipality: Lääneranna Parish

Population (01.01.2011)
  - Total: 19

Käru is a village in Lääneranna Parish, Pärnu County, in southwestern Estonia. It has a population of 19 (as of 1 January 2011).
