= Petaaluse =

Village in Estonia

- Village
- Location in Estonia
- Coordinates: 58°40′N 23°43′E
- Country: Estonia
- County: Pärnu County
- Parish: Lääneranna Parish
- Time zone: UTC+2 (EET)
  - Summer (DST): UTC+3 (EEST)

Petaaluse is a village in Lääneranna Parish, Pärnu County, in western Estonia.
