= Meelva, Pärnu County =

Village in Estonia

Coordinates: 58°42′47″N 23°40′15″E

Meelva
- Village
- Interactive map of Meelva
- Country: Estonia
- County: Pärnu County
- Parish: Lääneranna Parish
- Time zone: UTC+2 (EET)
  - Summer (DST): UTC+3 (EEST)

Meelva is a village in Lääneranna Parish, Pärnu County, in western Estonia.
