= Äila =

Village in Estonia

Coordinates: 58°34′05″N 23°42′39″E

- Village
- Interactive map of Äila
- Country: Estonia
- County: Pärnu County
- Parish: Lääneranna Parish
- Time zone: UTC+2 (EET)
  - Summer (DST): UTC+3 (EEST)

Äila is a village in Lääneranna Parish, Pärnu County in western Estonia.
