= Rumba, Estonia =

Village in Estonia

Coordinates: 58°44′N 24°09′E

Rumba
- Village
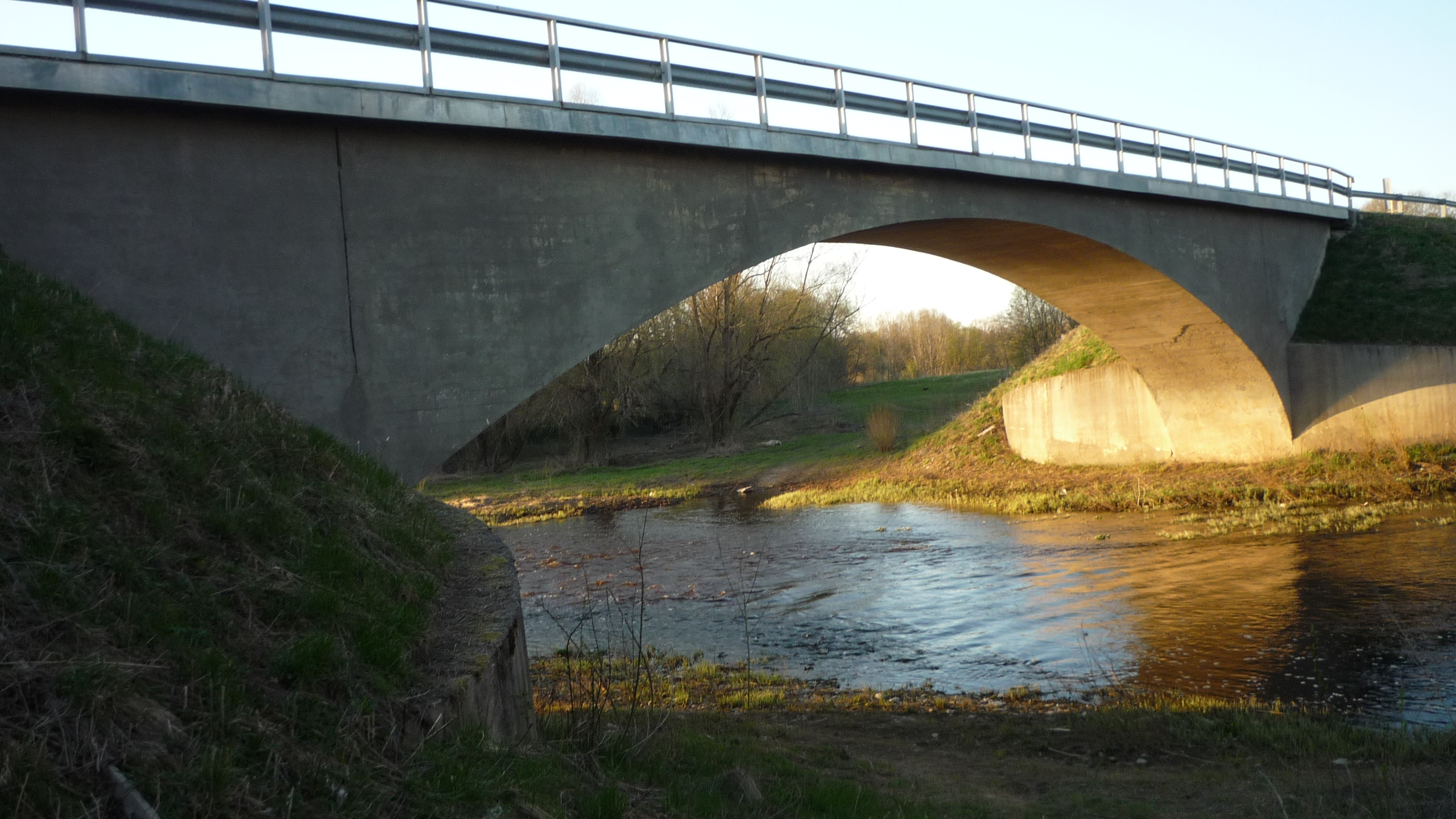
- Rumba bridge
- Interactive map of Rumba
- Country: Estonia
- County: Pärnu County
- Parish: Lääneranna Parish
- Time zone: UTC+2 (EET)
  - Summer (DST): UTC+3 (EEST)

Rumba is a village in Lääneranna Parish, Pärnu County, in western Estonia.
