= Rädi =

Village in Estonia

- village
- Location in Estonia
- Coordinates: 58°22′40″N 23°46′36″E
- Country: Estonia
- County: Pärnu County
- Municipality: Lääneranna Parish

Population (01.01.2011)
  - Total: 13
- Website: www.saulepi.planet.ee

Rädi is a village in Lääneranna Parish, Pärnu County, in southwestern Estonia. It has a population of 13 (as of 1 January 2011).
