= Piha, Estonia =

Village in Estonia

Piha
- village
- Location in Estonia
- Coordinates: 58°25′56″N 23°46′39″E
- Country: Estonia
- County: Pärnu County
- Municipality: Lääneranna Parish

Population (01.01.2011)
  - Total: 24

Piha is a village in Lääneranna Parish, Pärnu County, in southwestern Estonia. It had a population of 24 on 1 January 2011.
