= Kelu, Semnan =

Village in Semnan province, Iran

Kelu Persian: كلو
- Village
- Location within Iran
- Coordinates: 35°27′26″N 54°36′07″E
- Country: Iran
- Province: Semnan
- County: Damghan
- District: Amirabad
- Rural District: Qohab-e Rastaq

Population (2016)
  - Total: 241
- Time zone: UTC+3:30 (IRST)

Kelu (Persian: كلو) (Note: Also romanized as Kelū) is a village in Qohab-e Rastaq Rural District of Amirabad District in Damghan County, Semnan province, Iran.

== Demographics ==
=== Population ===
At the time of the 2006 National Census, the village's population was 199 in 49 households. The following census in 2011 counted 297 people in 71 households. The 2016 census measured the population of the village as 241 people in 67 households.
