= Saulepi =

Village in Estonia

- village
- Location in Estonia
- Coordinates: 58°21′10″N 23°46′54″E
- Country: Estonia
- County: Pärnu County
- Municipality: Lääneranna Parish

Population (01.01.2011)
  - Total: 7
- Website: www.saulepi.planet.ee

Saulepi is a village in Lääneranna Parish, Pärnu County, in southwestern Estonia, on the coast of the Gulf of Riga. It has only 7 inhabitants (as of 1 January 2011).

Saulepi Manor (Saulep) was established in 1797 by detaching it from the nearby Vana-Varbla Manor (Alt-Werpel). Simple wooden main building was constructed in the middle of the 19th century. Nowadays it is a private property.

The islets Kõrksaar and Rootsiku laid also belong to Saulepi village.
