= Koeri, Estonia =

Village in Estonia

Koeri
- village
- Location in Estonia
- Coordinates: 58°27′47″N 23°54′06″E
- Country: Estonia
- County: Pärnu County
- Municipality: Lääneranna Parish

Population (01.01.2011)
  - Total: 0

Koeri is an uninhabited village in Lääneranna Parish, Pärnu County, in southwestern Estonia.
