= Rannu, Uttar Pradesh =

Coordinates: 24°08′N 83°13′E

Rannu is a village in Uttar Pradesh, India.
