= Järise, Pärnu County =

Village in Estonia

Coordinates: 58°39′37″N 23°41′14″E

Järise
- Village
- Interactive map of Järise
- Country: Estonia
- County: Pärnu County
- Parish: Lääneranna Parish
- Time zone: UTC+2 (EET)
  - Summer (DST): UTC+3 (EEST)

Järise is a village in Lääneranna Parish, Pärnu County, in western Estonia.
