= Kirikuküla, Pärnu County =

Village in Estonia

Coordinates: 58°42′36″N 23°46′39″E

Kirikuküla
- Village
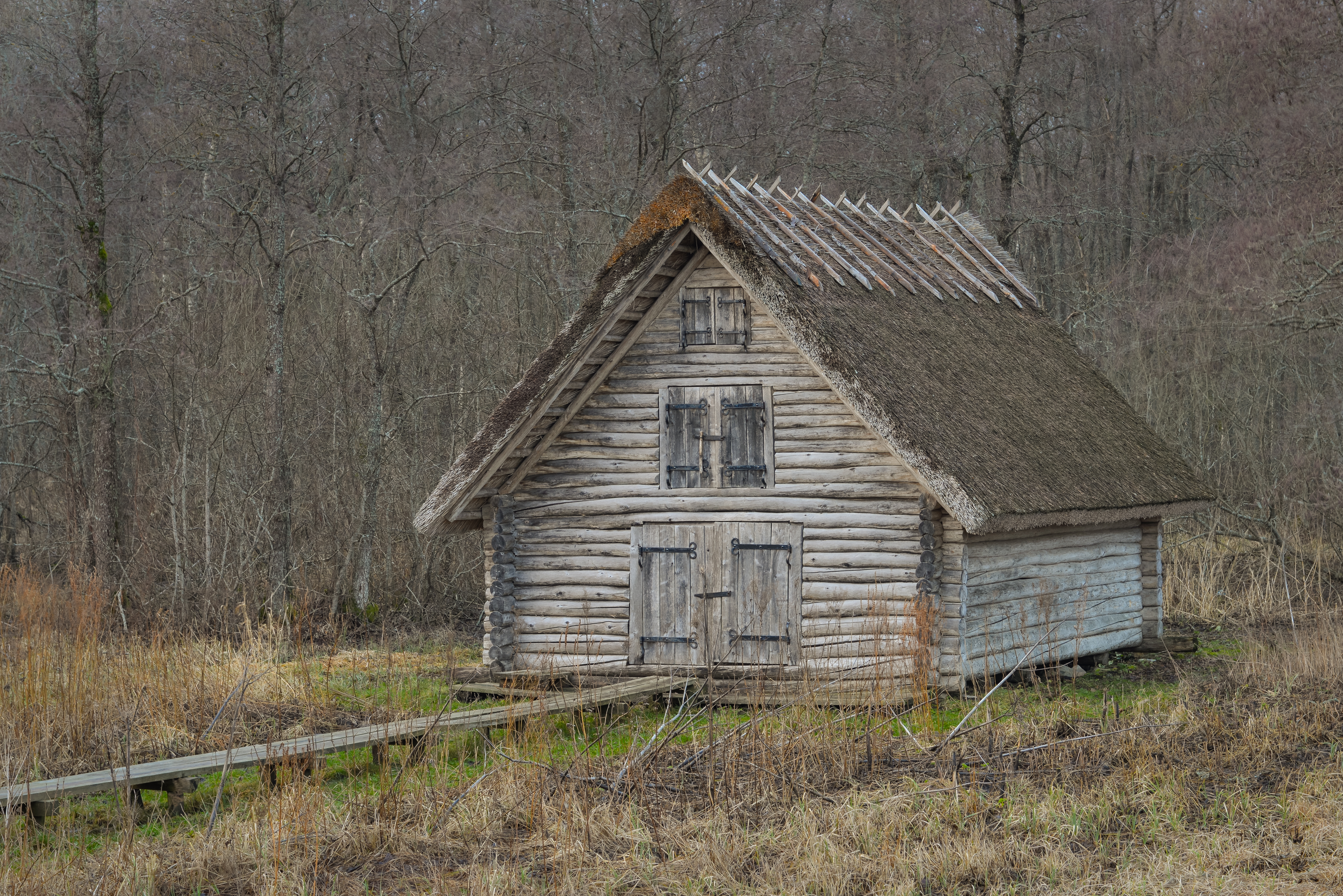
- Interactive map of Kirikuküla
- Country: Estonia
- County: Pärnu County
- Parish: Lääneranna Parish
- Time zone: UTC+2 (EET)
  - Summer (DST): UTC+3 (EEST)

Kirikuküla is a village in Lääneranna Parish, Pärnu County, in western Estonia.
