= Rannu, Pärnu County =

Village in Estonia

- Village
- Location within Estonia
- Coordinates: 58.7397°N 23.9417°E
- Country: Estonia
- County: Pärnu County
- Parish: Lääneranna Parish
- Time zone: UTC+2 (EET)
  - Summer (DST): UTC+3 (EEST)

Rannu is a village in Lääneranna Parish, Pärnu County in Estonia.
