= Nehatu Nature Reserve =

Protected area in Estonia

- Location within Estonia
- Location: Estonia
- Coordinates: 58.55°N 23.65°E
- Area: 1,185.5 ha (2,929 acres)

Nehatu Nature Reserve is a nature reserve in Pärnu County, Estonia. Its area is 1185.5 ha.

The protected area was formed in 1957 when Nehatu Bog was taken under protection.

Protected species:

- Haliaeetus albicilla
- Circus aeruginosus
- Grus grus
- Cladium mariscus.
