= Paadrema Nature Reserve =

Protected area in Estonia

- Location within Estonia
- Location: Estonia
- Nearest city: Lihula
- Coordinates: 58°23′09″N 23°50′03″E
- Area: 1,332 ha (3,290 acres)
- Established: 2003

Paadrema Nature Reserve is a nature reserve situated in south-western Estonia, in Pärnu County.

The nature reserve of Paadrema is centred on Paadrema fen, surrounded by old-growth forest and swamps. Typical plants that grow in the area include several species of orchid and sweet gale. Among birds, white-tailed eagle, white-spotted bluethroat, red-backed shrike and common crane can be found in the nature reserve.
