= Lihula Parish =

Former municipality of Estonia

Coordinates: 58°40′N 23°50′E

Lihula Parish Lihula vald
- Former municipality of Estonia
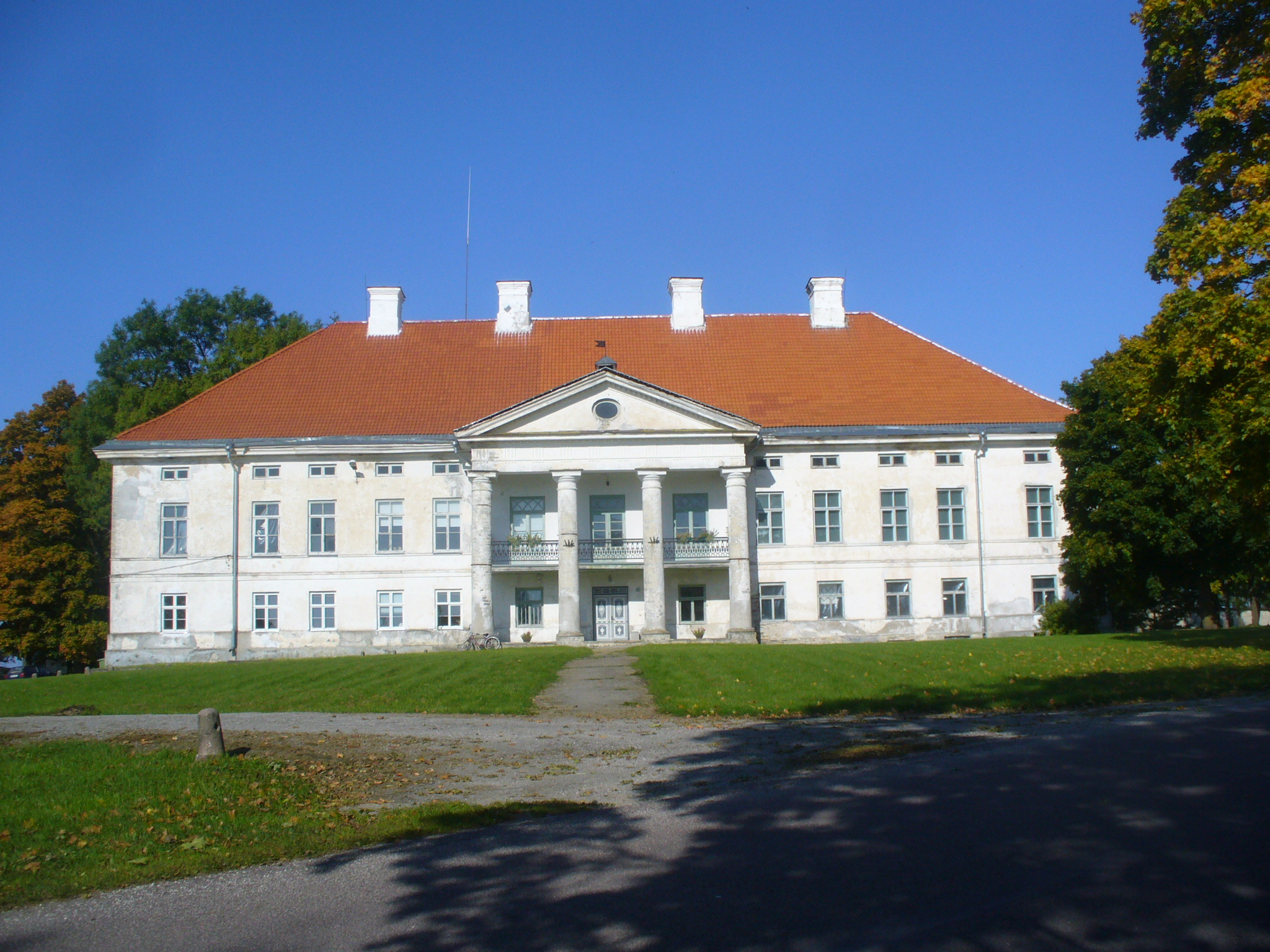
- Lihula manor

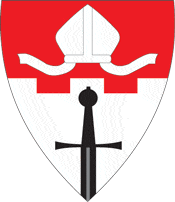
- Flag Coat of arms

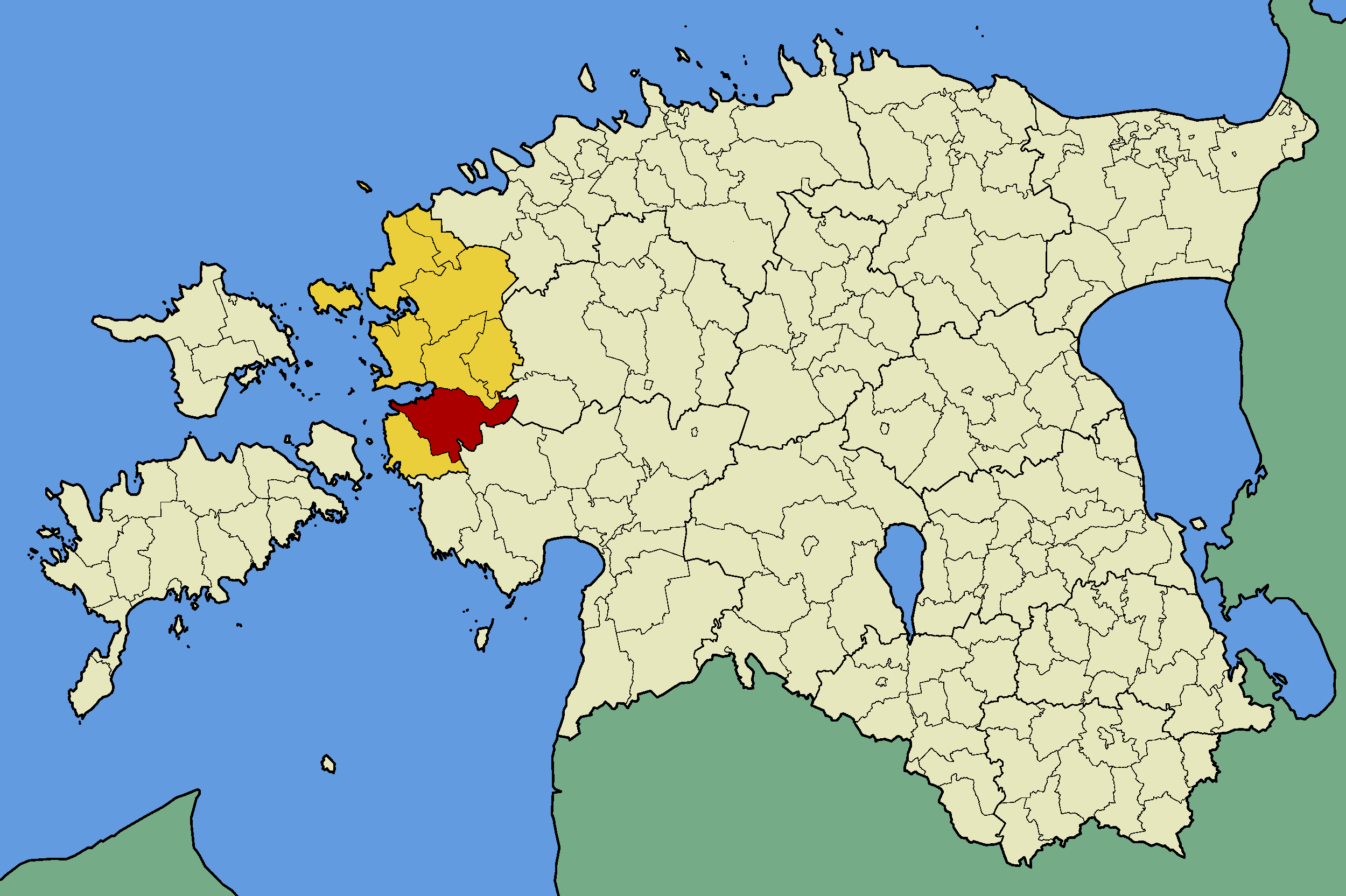
- Lihula Parish within Lääne County.
- Country: Estonia
- County: Lääne County
- Administrative centre: Lihula

Area
  - Total: 367.31 km^{2} (141.82 sq mi)

Population (01.01.2010)
  - Total: 2,652
  - Density: 7.220/km^{2} (18.70/sq mi)
- Website: www.lihula.ee

Lihula Parish (Estonian: Lihula vald) was a rural municipality in Lääne County, Estonia. It had a population of 2,652 (as of 1 January 2010) and an area of 367.31 km^{2} (141.82 sq mi). In 2017, Lihula Parish, Hanila Parish, Koonga Parish, and Varbla Parish were merged to form Lääneranna Parish.

== Settlements ==
=== Town ===
Lihula

=== Villages ===
- Alaküla
- Aruküla
- Hälvati
- Järise
- Jõeääre
- Keemu
- Kelu
- Kirbla
- Kirikuküla
- Kloostri
- Kunila
- Laulepa
- Lautna
- Liustemäe
- Matsalu
- Meelva
- Metsküla
- Mõisimaa
- Nurme
- Pagasi
- Parivere
- Peanse
- Penijõe
- Petaaluse
- Poanse
- Rannu
- Rootsi
- Rumba
- Saastna
- Seira
- Seli
- Soovälja
- Tuhu
- Tuudi
- Uluste
- Vagivere
- Valuste
- Vanamõisa
- Võhma
- Võigaste

== Notable people ==
- Eerik Kumari (1912–1984), biologist and pioneer of ornithology, was born (as Erik Mathias Sits) in Lihula Parish.
