= Matsalu National Park =

National park in Estonia

- Matsalu rahvuspark
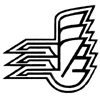

- Location within Estonia
- Location: Estonia
- Nearest city: Lihula
- Coordinates: 58°45′36″N 23°35′49″E
- Area: 488.6 km^{2} (189 sq mi)
- Established: 1957

Ramsar Wetland
- Official name: Matsalu Nature Reserve
- Designated: 29 March 1994
- Reference no.: 104

Matsalu National Park (previously Matsalu Nature Reserve, Estonian: Matsalu rahvuspark, often just Matsalu) is a nature reserve and national park in the Lääne and Pärnu counties of Estonia. Matsalu National Park spans an area of 486.1 km^{2} (187.7 sq mi), comprising Matsalu Bay, the Kasari River delta, the village of Matsalu and surrounding areas.

Matsalu Bay is one of the most important wetland bird areas in Europe, due to its prime position on the East Atlantic Flyway. Large numbers of migratory birds use Matsalu as a staging area. Every spring over two million waterfowl pass Matsalu, of which around 1.6 million are long-tailed duck.

Matsalu National Park is a home for a number of endangered species, many of which are listed in the Estonian IUCN Red List, including white-tailed eagle in the highest conservation category, lots of bird species in the second and third protection categories, 22 strongly protected plant species, natterjack toad and ten species of mammal in the second conservation category.

== Description ==
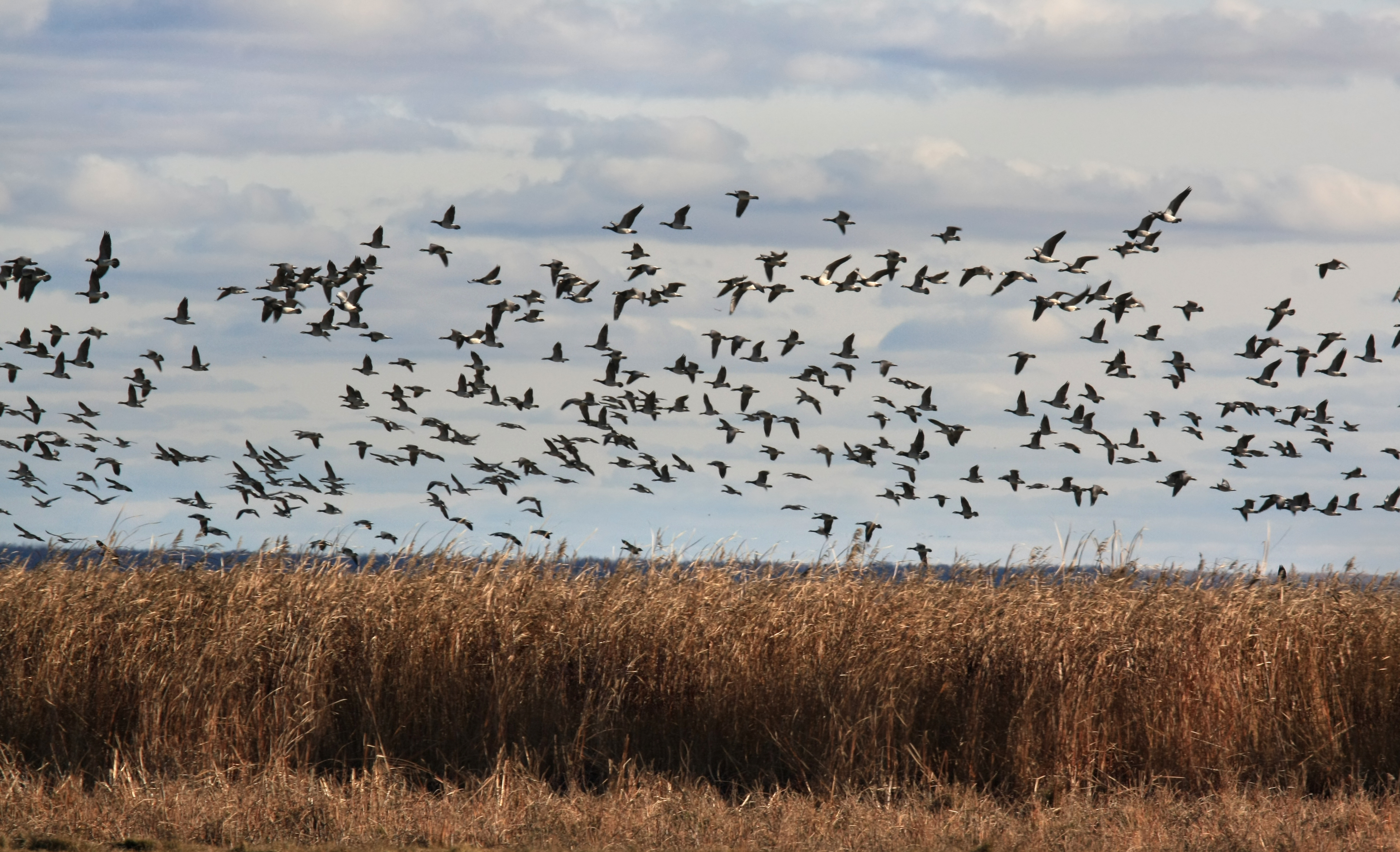
Reeds and barnacle geese on the coast Matsalu Nature Reserve.

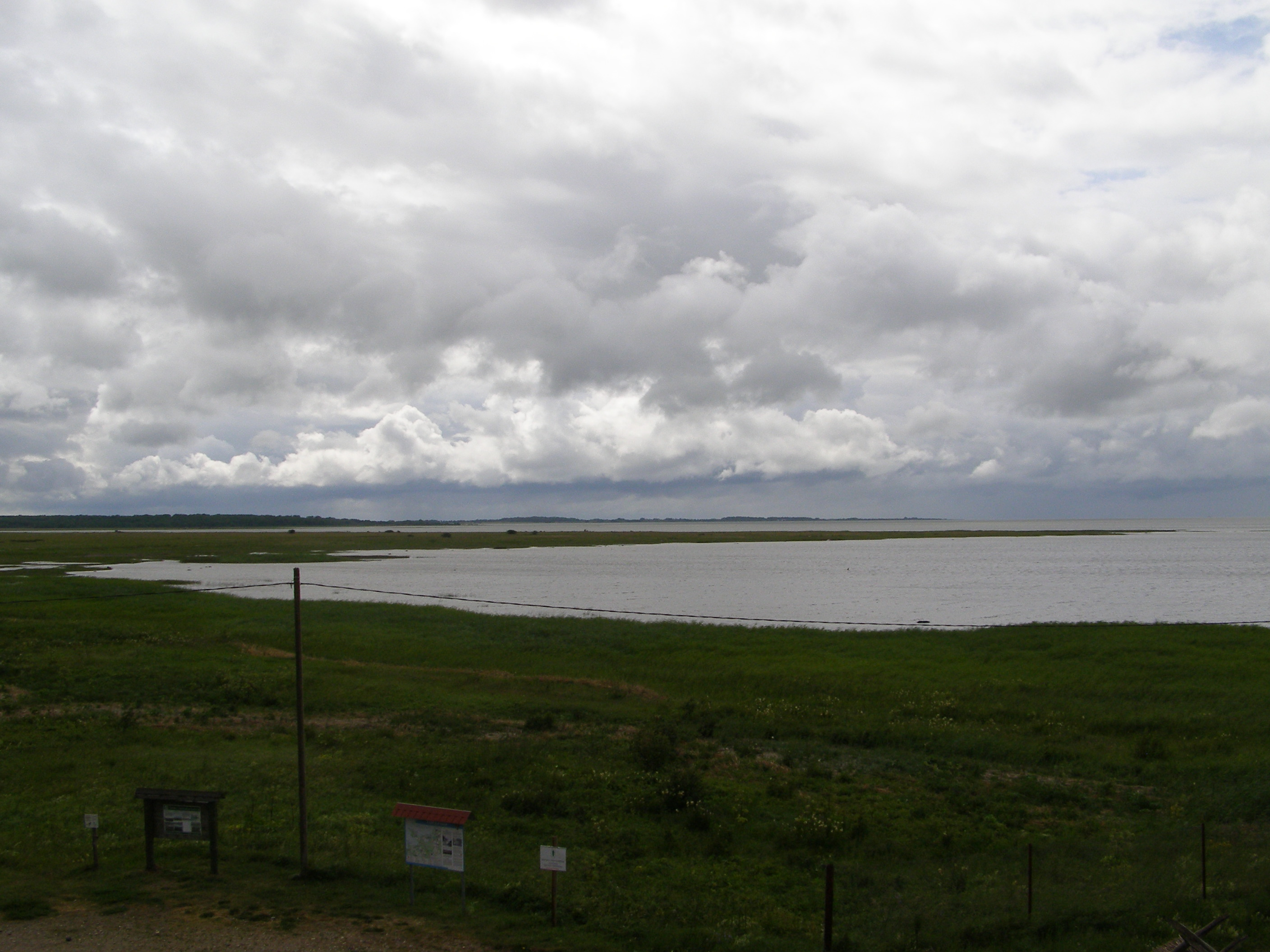
View on Matsalu Bay from Keemu bird-watching tower

Matsalu National Park has an area of 486.1 km^{2} (187.7 sq mi), encompassing Matsalu Bay along with the delta of the Kasari River and its surrounding areas — floodplains, coastal meadows, reedbeds, woodlands, wooded meadows and the section of Väinameri around the mouth of the bay, which includes more than 50 islands. 224.3 km^{2} (86.6 sq mi) of the protected area is terrestrial and 261.8 km^{2} (101.1 sq mi) is aquatic. Matsalu Bay is shallow, brackish and rich in nutrients. The bay is 18 km (11.2 mi) long and 6 km (3.7 mi) wide, but has an average depth of only 1.5 metres (5 ft) and a maximum depth of 3.5 m (11 ft). Water salinity is approximately 0.7 per mil. Shoreline length of the bay is about 165 km (102.5 mi). The bay's shoreline lacks high banks and is populated mostly with shingle shores, with muddy and overgrown reed in the innermost, sheltered part of the bay.

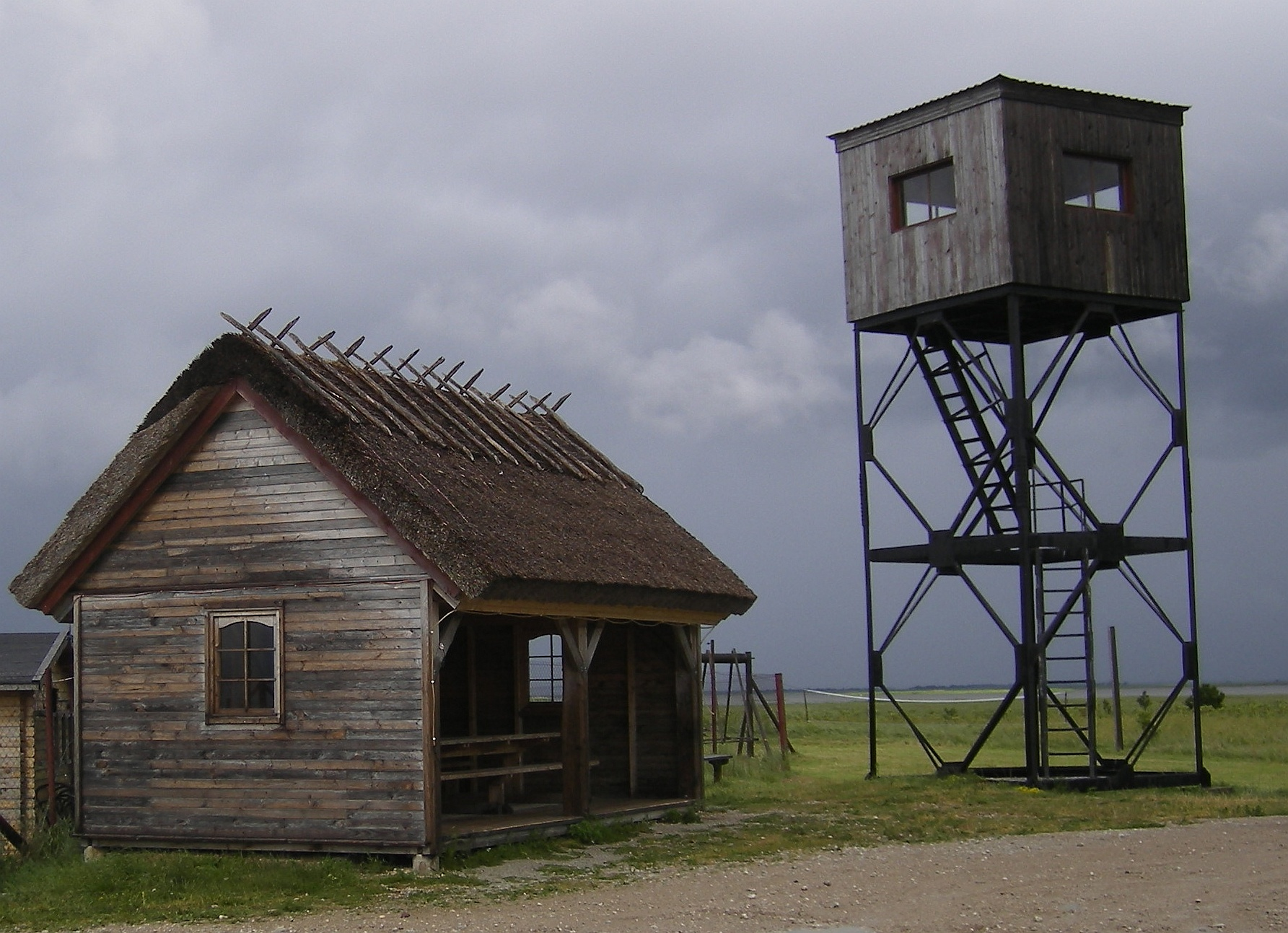
Keemu bird-watching tower

The Kasari River is the biggest of several rivers that empty into Matsalu Bay. The delta of the Kasari River is not in its natural condition due to dredging between 1930 and 1960; the alluvial meadow of the delta (40 km^{2} (15 sq mi)), most of which is actively managed, is one of the biggest open wet meadows in Europe. Reeds and rushes surrounding the main channel expand westwards up to 100 m (328 ft) every year. Annual inflow into the Matsalu Bay from the Kasari River exceeds the volume of the bay itself approximately eight times; average seasonal variation of the Kasari River exceeds 1.7 metres (6 ft). The rivers carry large quantities of nutrient-rich sediments into the bay from an over 3,500 km^{2} (1,350 sq mi) drainage basin. The sediments are deposited in river estuaries, allowing reedbeds to expand.

A total of 282 bird species have been recorded in Matsalu, among which 175 are nesting and 33 are transmigrant waterfowl. 49 species of fish and 47 species of mammals are registered in the area of the nature reserve, along with 772 species of vascular plants.

Every spring over two million waterfowl pass Matsalu, including 10,000—20,000 Bewick's swan, 10,000 greater scaup, common goldeneye, tufted duck, goosander and many others. A colony of up to 20,000 barnacle geese, over 10,000 greylag geese and thousands of waders stop on the coastal pastures in spring. The most numerous birds of passage (around 1.6 million) are long-tailed duck. Approximately 35,000—40,000 ducks feed in the reedbeds in spring. In autumn, about 300,000 migratory waterfowl pass Matsalu. The wetland is the biggest autumn stopping ground of common crane in Europe. The highest recorded number of cranes at the park has been 23,000.

== History ==
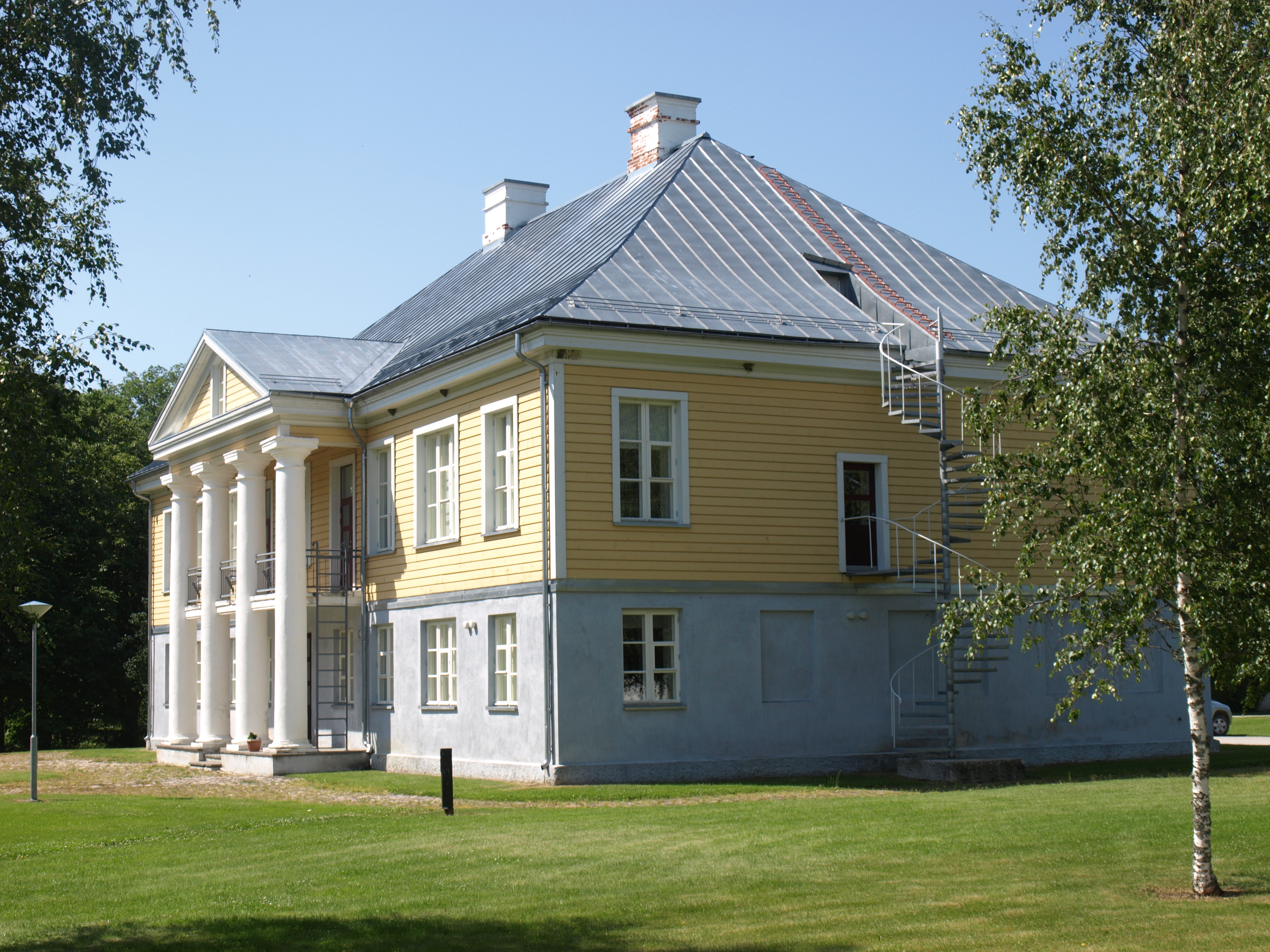
Penijõe manor, regional office of State Nature Conservation Centre and the centre of Matsalu National Park

Scientific research in Matsalu started around 1870, when Valerian Russow, the curator of the Natural History Museum of the University of Tartu, gave a short overview of birds near Matsalu Bay. Between 1928 and 1936 Eerik Kumari researched birds in Matsalu and suggested a creation of the bird protection area there in 1936. In 1939, parts of the bay (Virtsu-Puhtu) were protected for mud used in mud-baths.

Research in Matsalu became regular in 1945, when the Institute of Botany and Zoology of the Estonian Academy of Sciences established a research base in Penijõe. Matsalu Nature Reserve was founded in 1957, mainly to protect nesting, moulting and migratory birds. The first permanent workers (administrators and scientists) started in 1958 and the Penijõe research base became the administrative centre of the newly created nature reserve. The Estonian Bird Ringing Centre (Estonian: Rõngastuskeskus), the coordinator of bird ringing in Estonia, is also located in Penijõe.

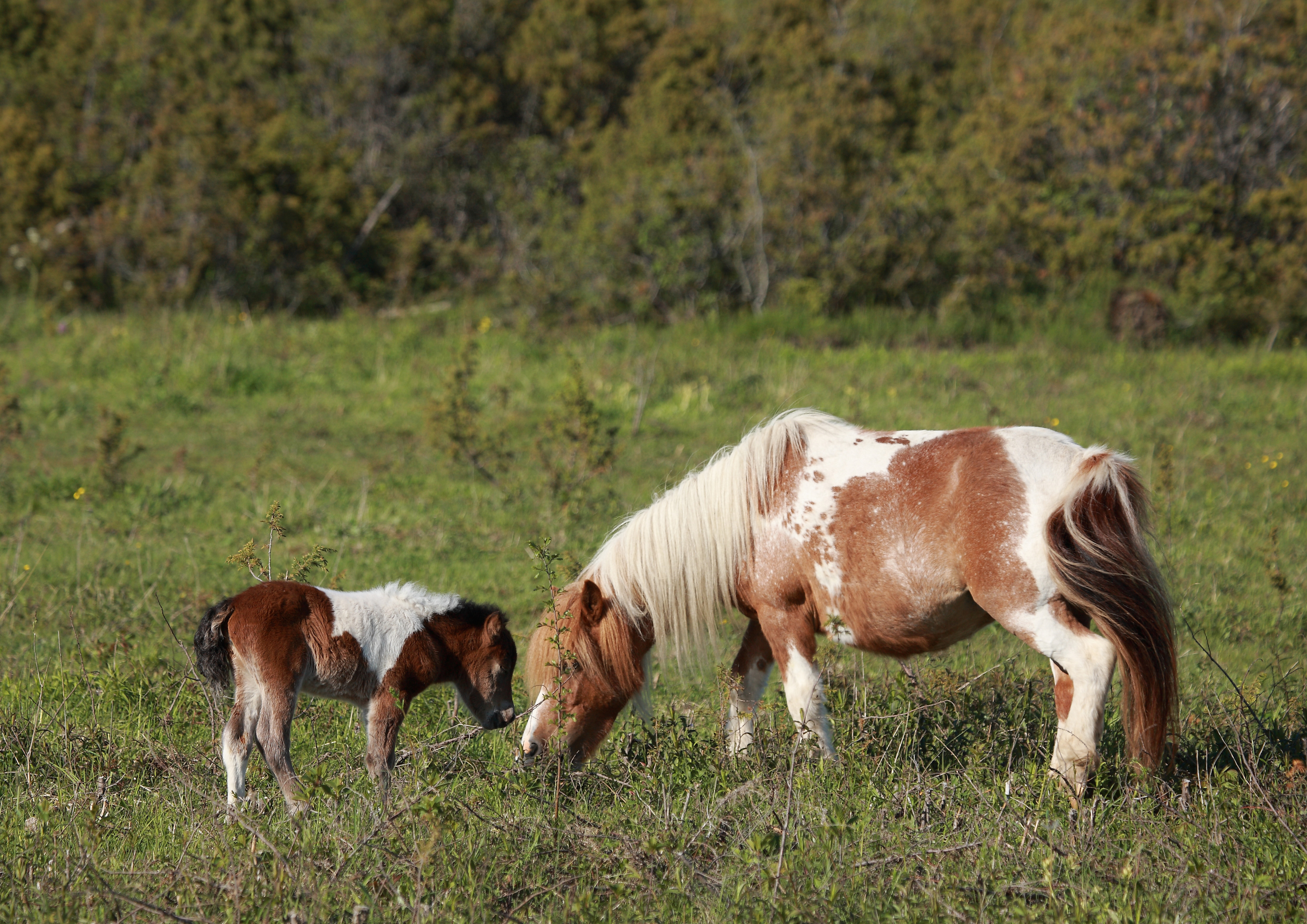
Horses in Matsalu

In 1976, Matsalu was included in the list of wetlands of international importance under the International Convention on the Protection of Wetlands (Ramsar Convention). The European Diploma of Protected Areas was awarded to Matsalu Nature Reserve in 2003 by the Council of Europe, in recognition of the park's success in preserving the diversity of habitats and the numerous species of birds and other biota groups in the nature reserve. Matsalu is the only nature reserve in Estonia to hold the European Diploma. The diploma was extended for five years in 2008.

In 2004, Matsalu Nature Reserve, along with surrounding areas, became Matsalu National Park. Matsalu has seven bird-watching towers (Penijõe, Kloostri, Haeska, Suitsu, Jugasaare, Küdeva and Keemu) and three hiking trails.

== Matsalu International Nature Film Festival ==
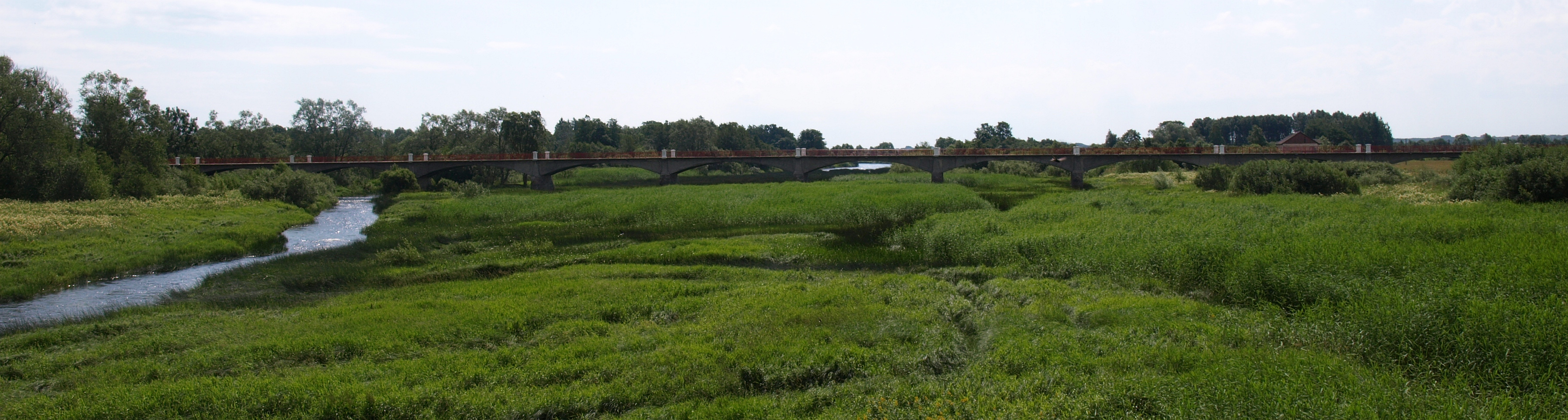
Old concrete bridge over Kasari River, at the easternmost border of Matsalu National Park. Built in 1904, it was the longest concrete bridge in the world at that time (308 metres (1,010 ft)) and is now used only for pedestrian traffic.

Matsalu International Nature Film Festival (Estonian: Matsalu loodusfilmide festival) is held every autumn in the nearby town of Lihula. The festival is organized by the non-profit organization MTÜ Matsalu Loodusfilmide Festival, which was set up in late 2003. In February 2010, MTÜ Matsalu Loodusfilmide Festival partnered with the Estonian State Forest Management Centre (RMK) and will jointly organize the film festivals in the future.

The first Matsalu Nature Film Festival was held between October 3 and October 5, 2003, in Lihula with a competitive program of 23 films from 7 countries. More than 2,500 people visited the festival that year. The second festival was held between September 23, and September 25, 2004, with participants from 14 countries, a competitive program of 35 films and around 5,000 visitors. The third festival took place between September 22 and September 25, 2005, with a competitive program of 39 films from 16 countries and over 7,000 visitors. The fourth festival, held between September 21 and September 24, 2006, had 21 participating countries and 41 competing films. The fifth Matsalu Nature Film Festival was held between September 19 and September 23, 2007, and had more than 7,000 visitors. Organizers admit that as the festival is held on a nature reserve, it cannot grow much larger in a little town and therefore plan to bring mostly European nature documentaries to the festival, at the same time not forgetting the human-related topics.

In 2007, organizers of the Matsalu International Nature Film Festival received the Environmental Award of the Year from the Estonian Ministry of Environment. The ministry pointed out persistent and successful organization of the film festival over the years, which has popularized nature protection and contributed significantly to environmental awareness.

== Gallery ==
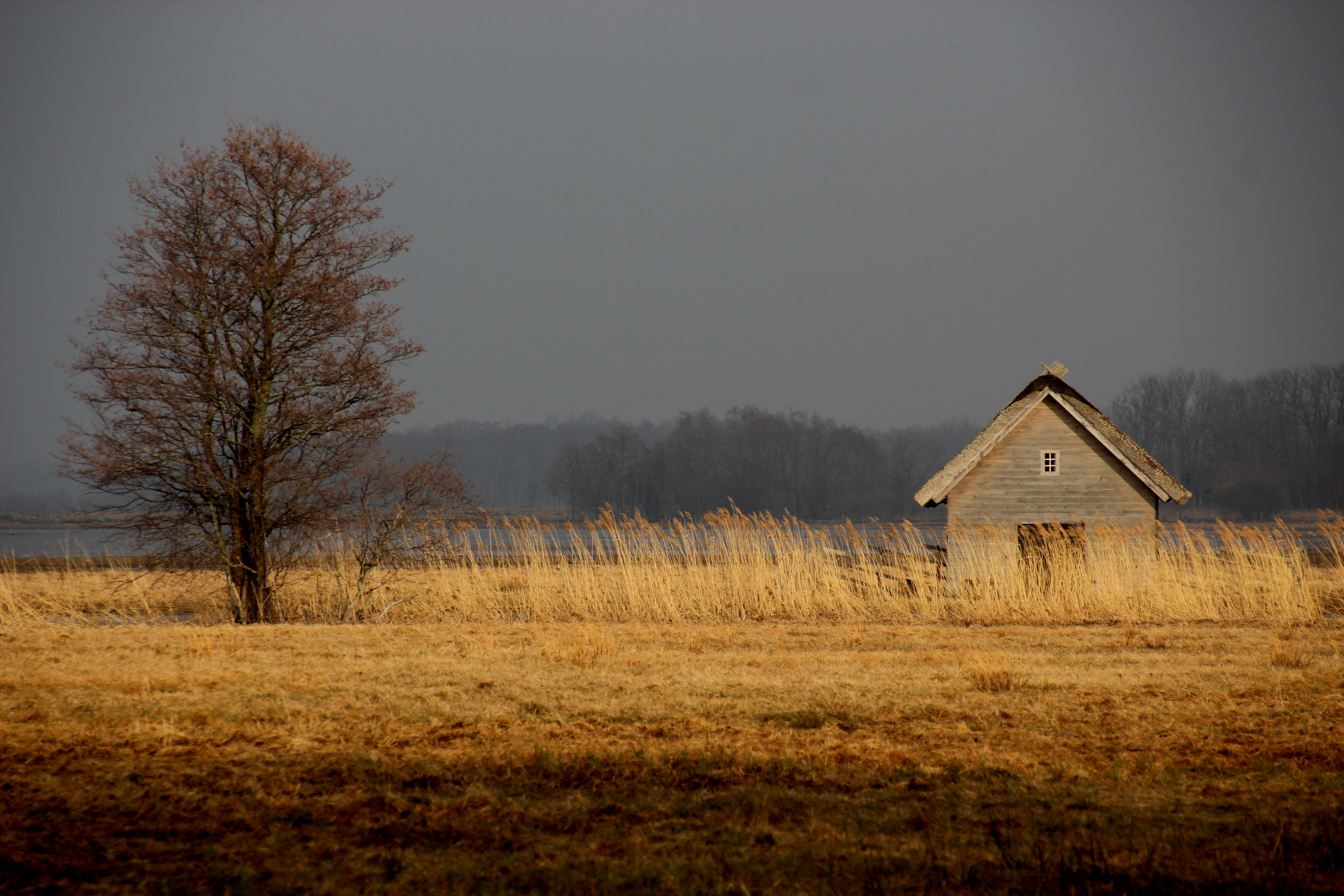
Suitsu meadow

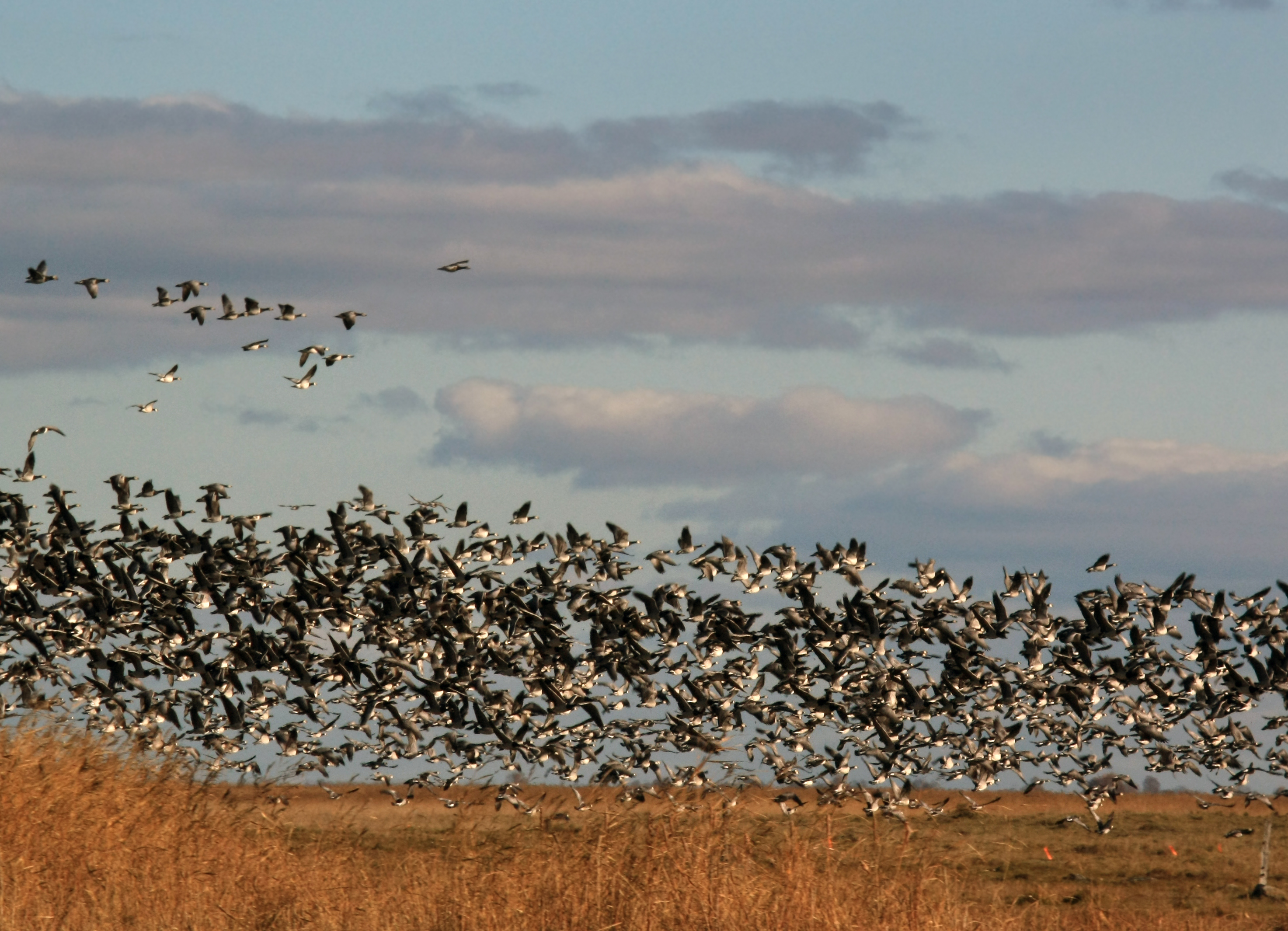
A flock of barnacle geese

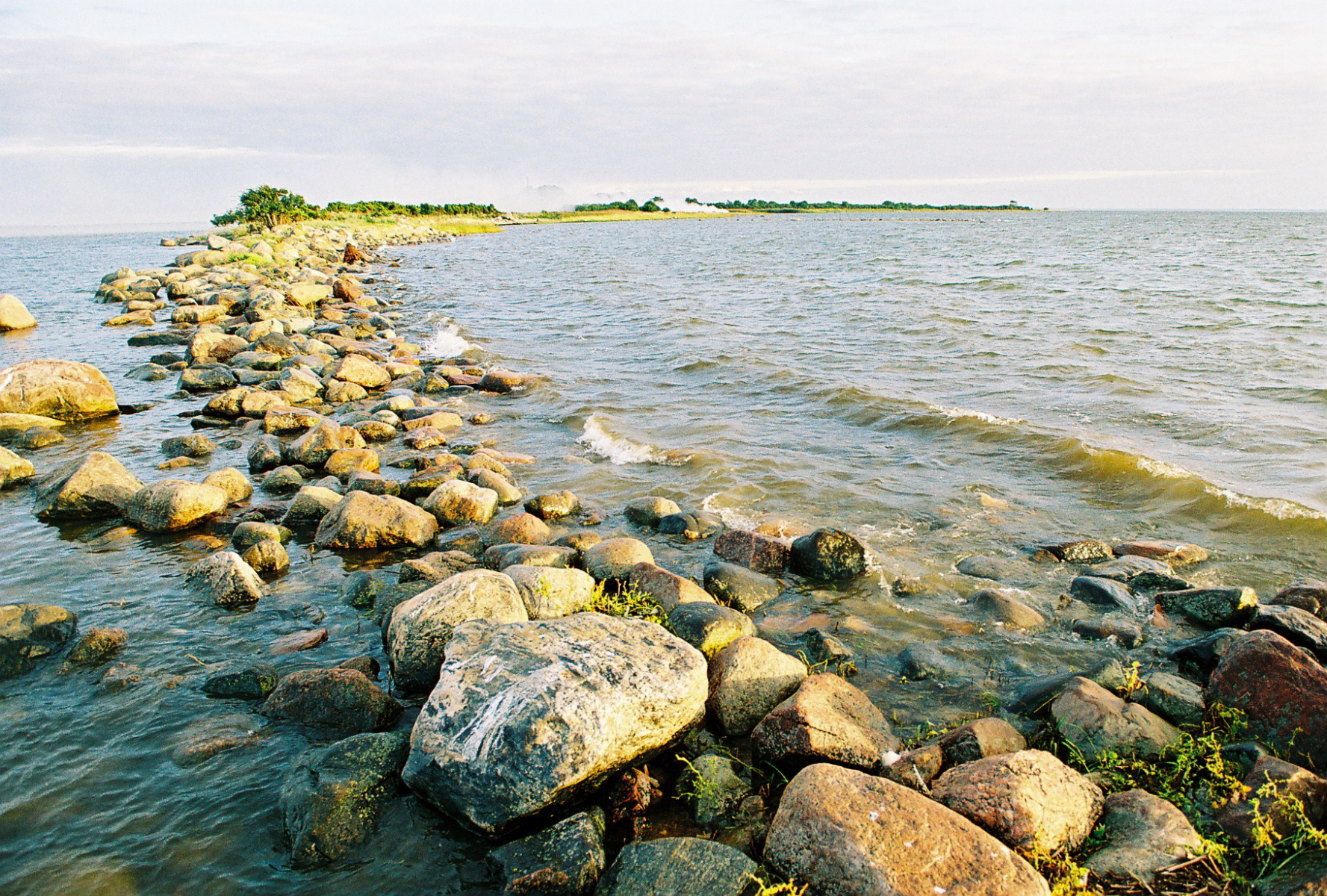
Kumari

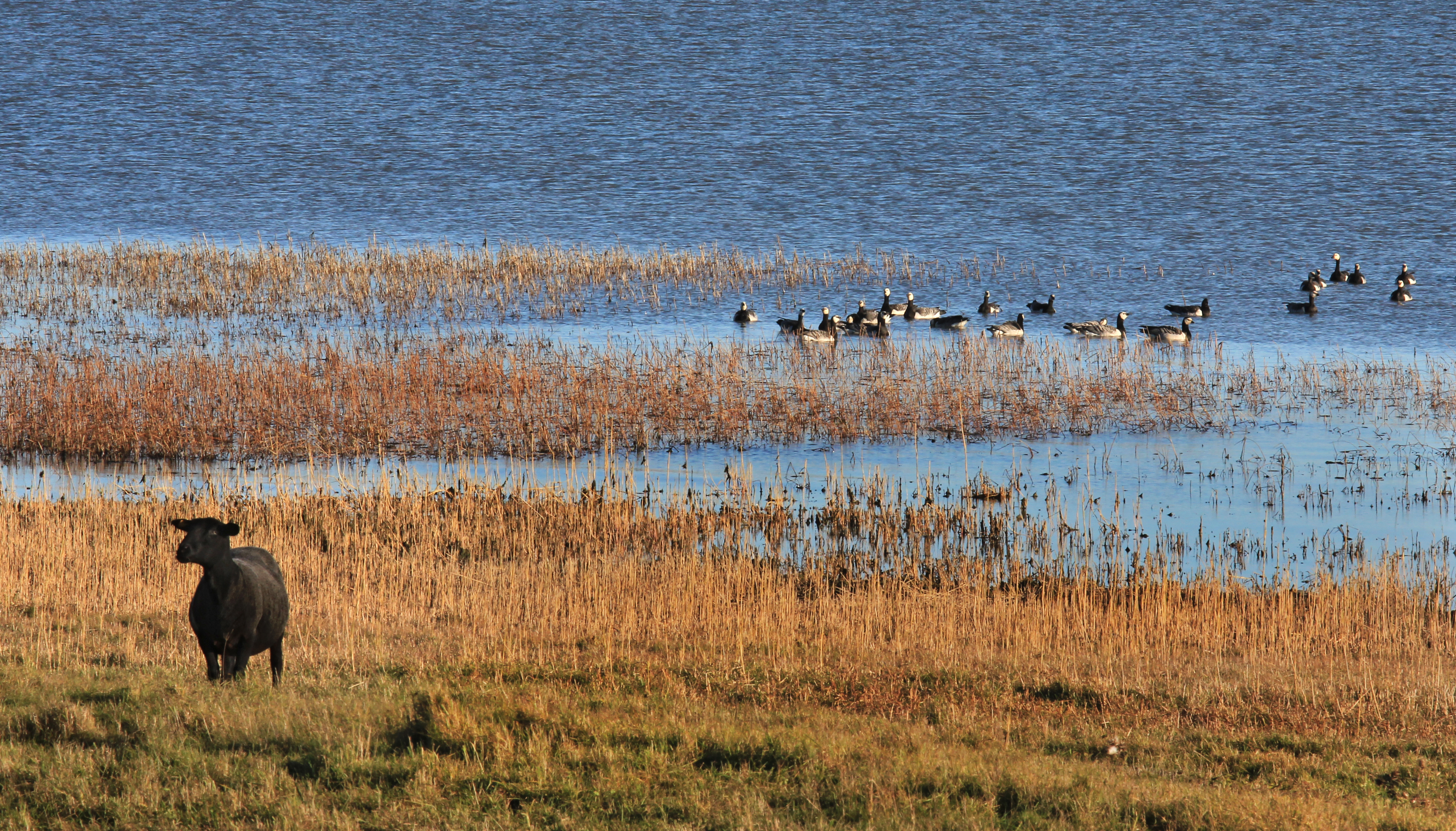
Coast in Puise peninsula

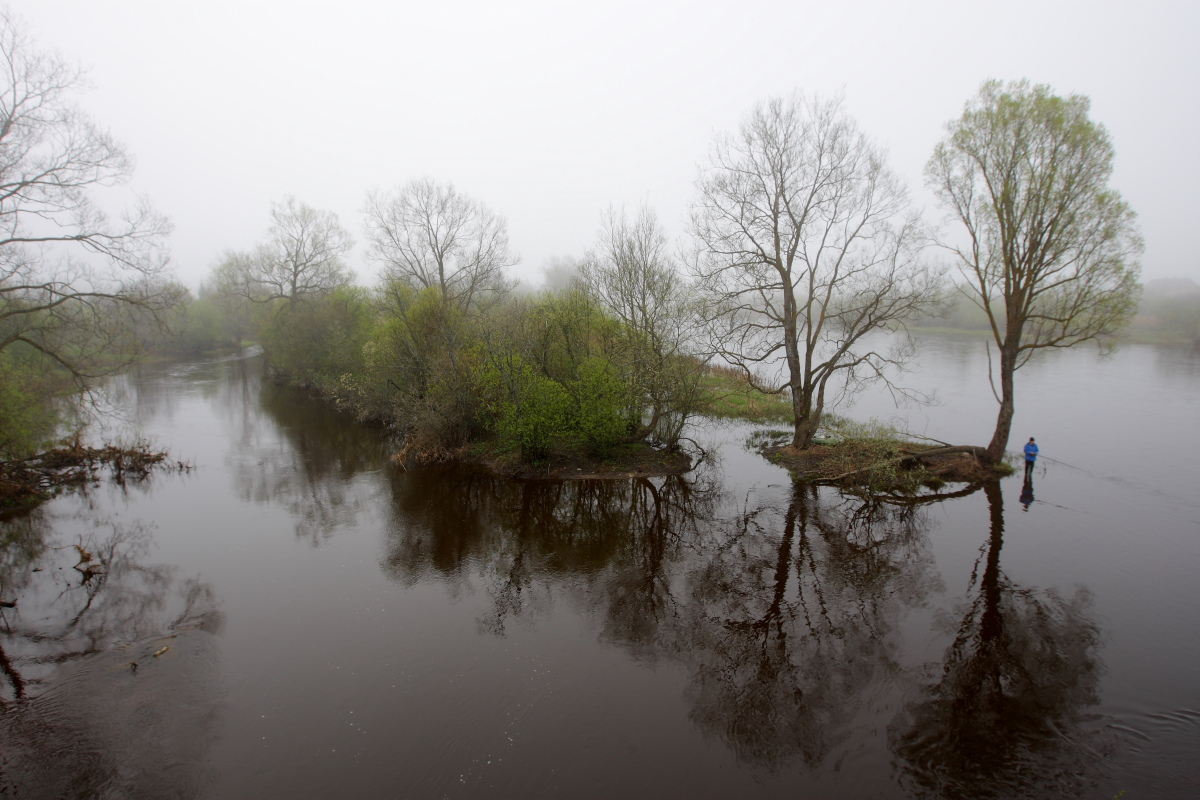
Spring flood in Kasari River

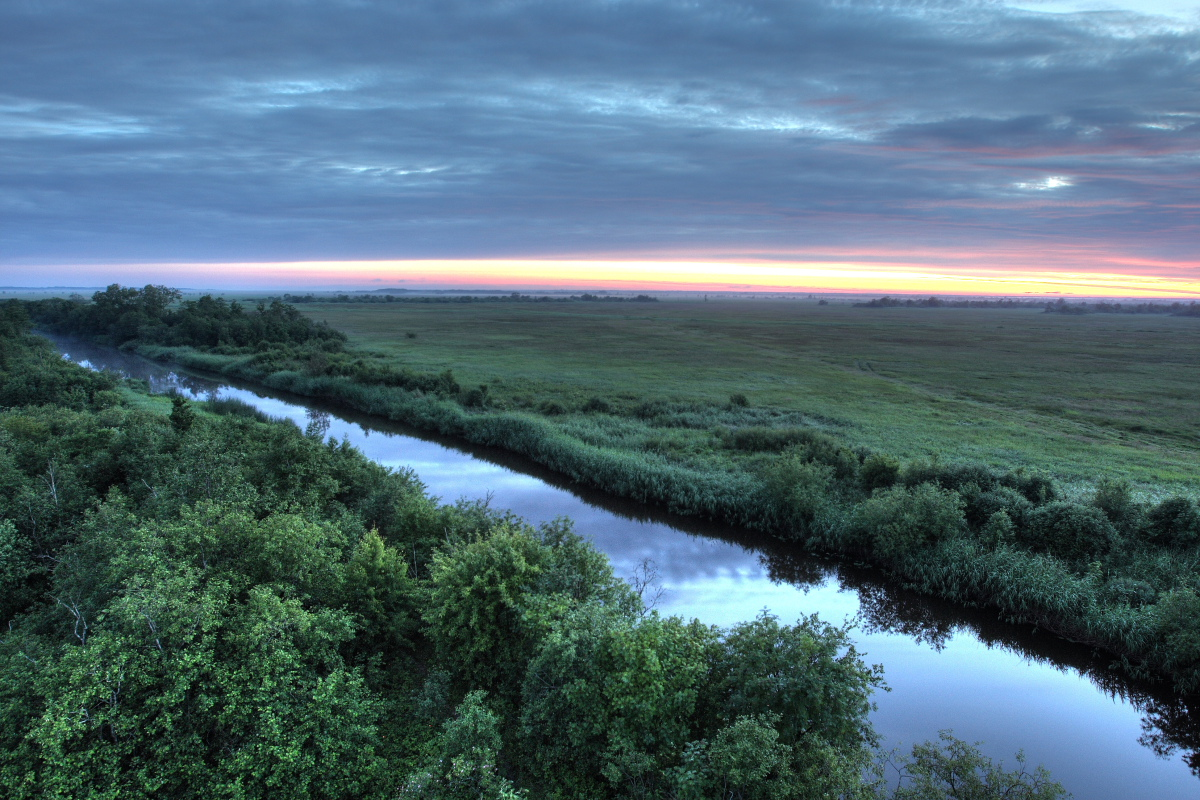
Kasari River

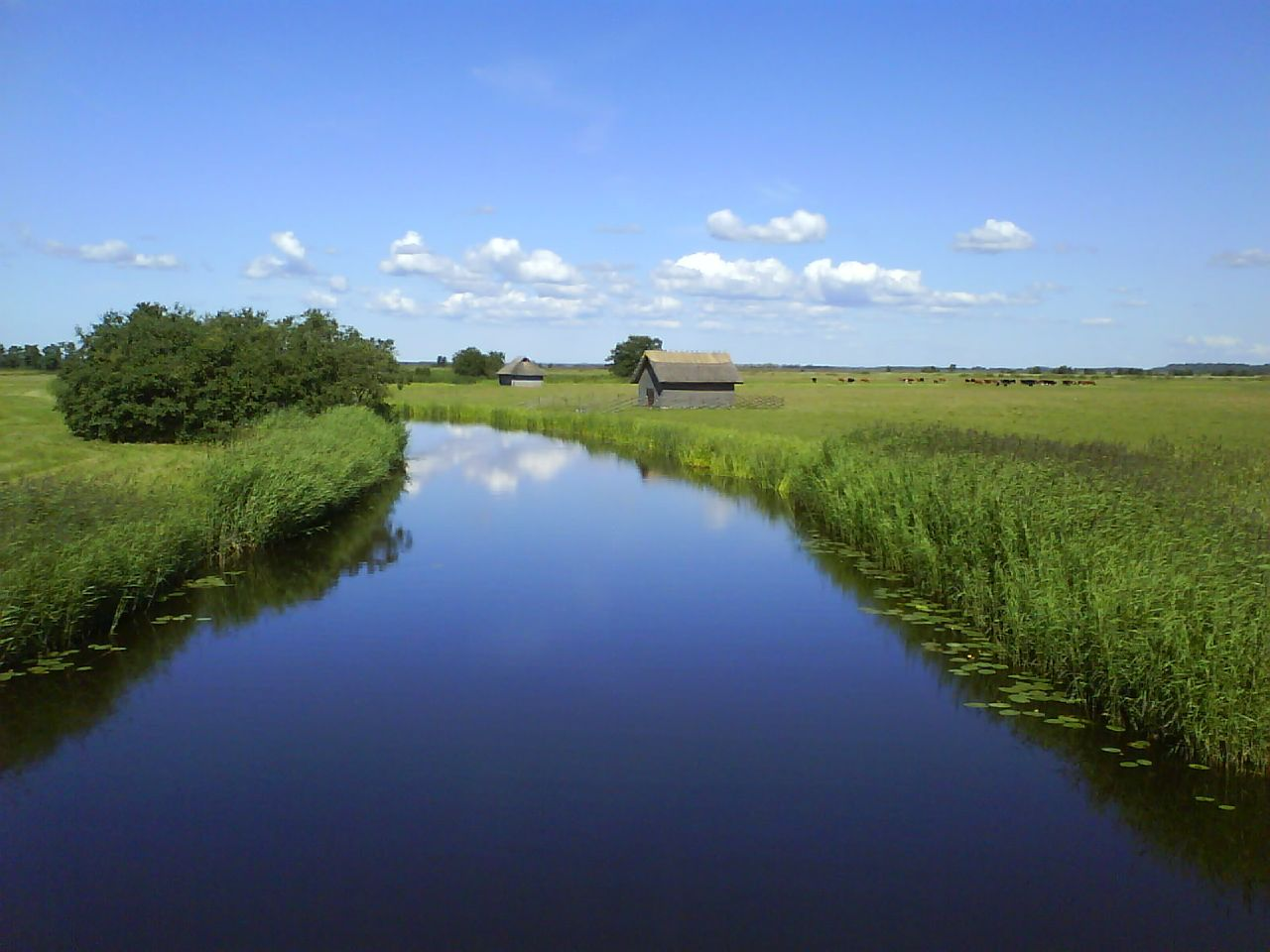
Fishermen huts by the Suitsu River in Matsalu National Park

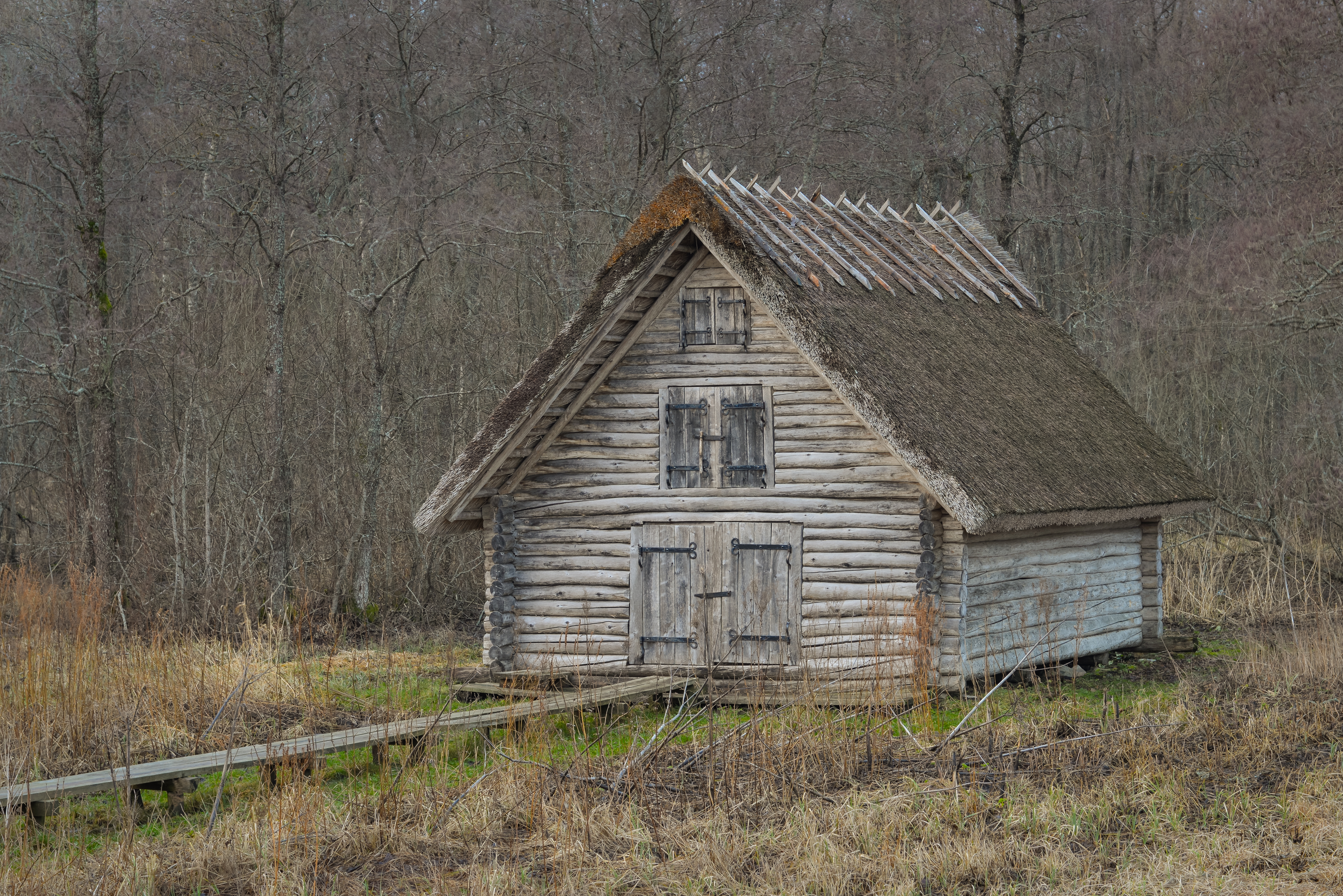
Old hay barn at the end of Suitsu hiking trail

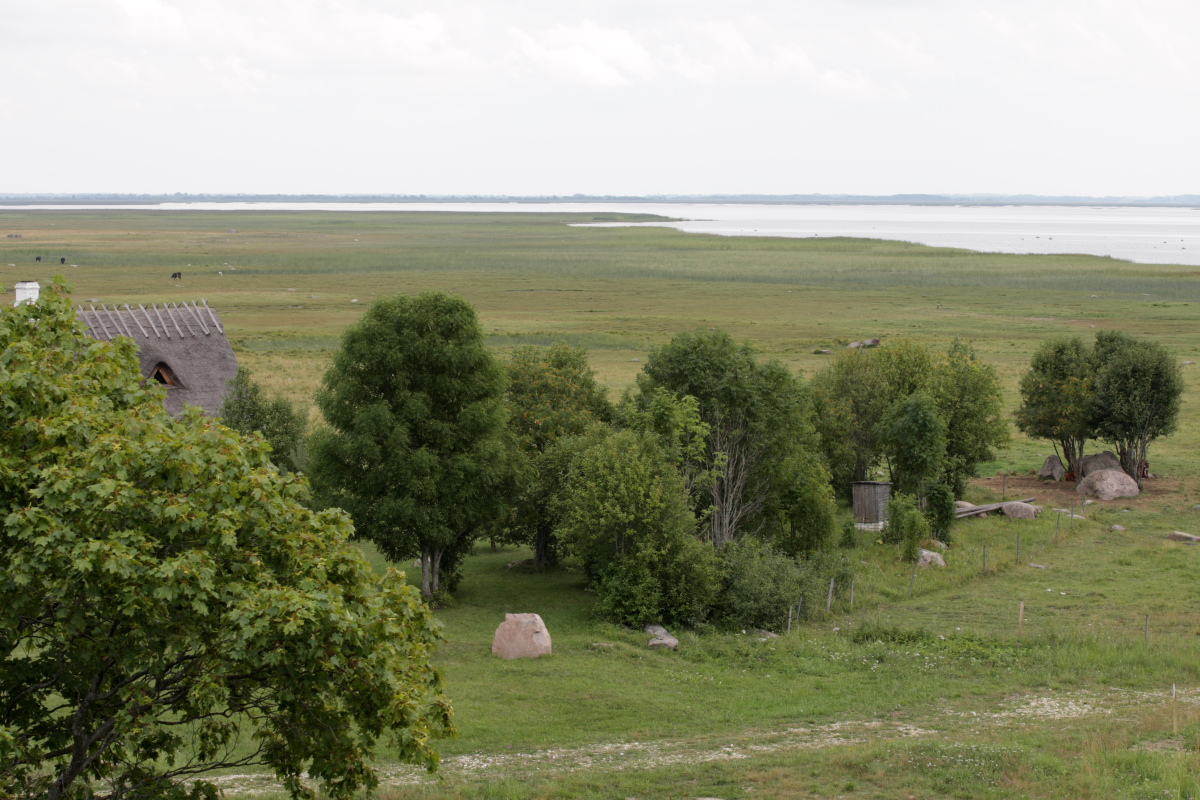
The coastline seen from the village of Haeska

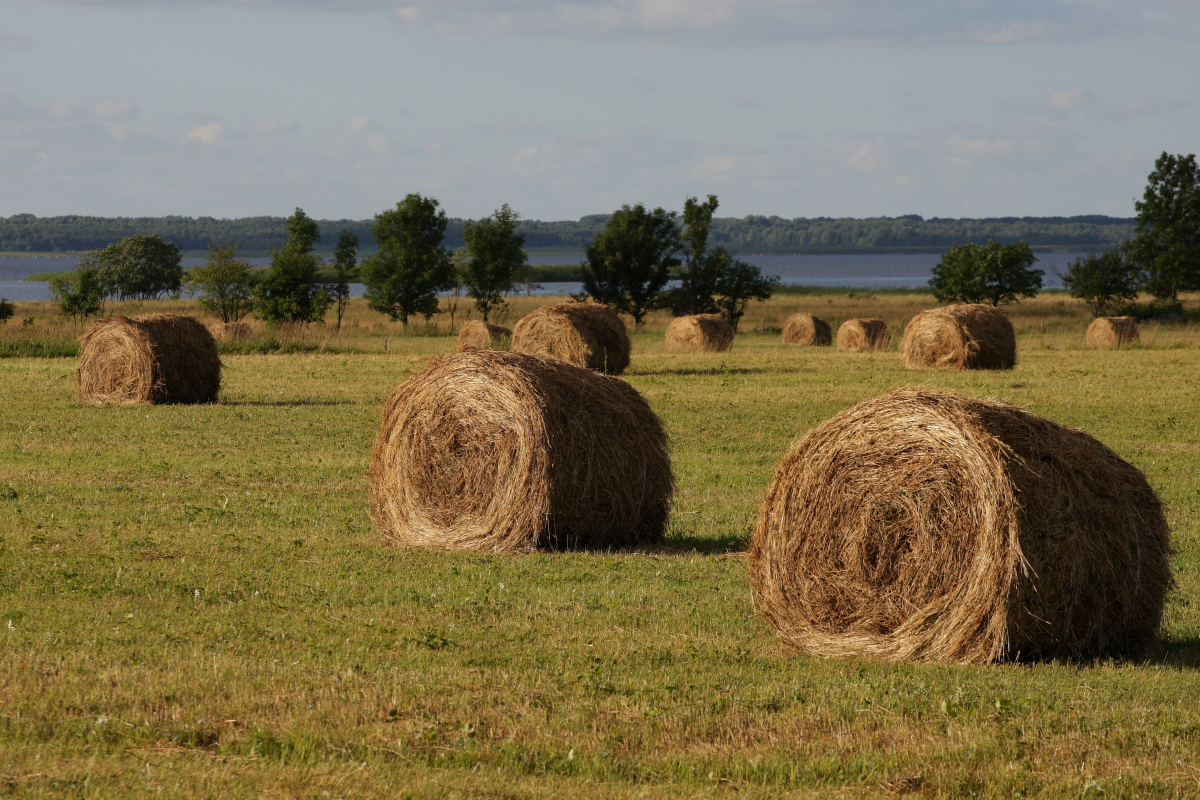
Hay bails on the Puhtulaid peninsula

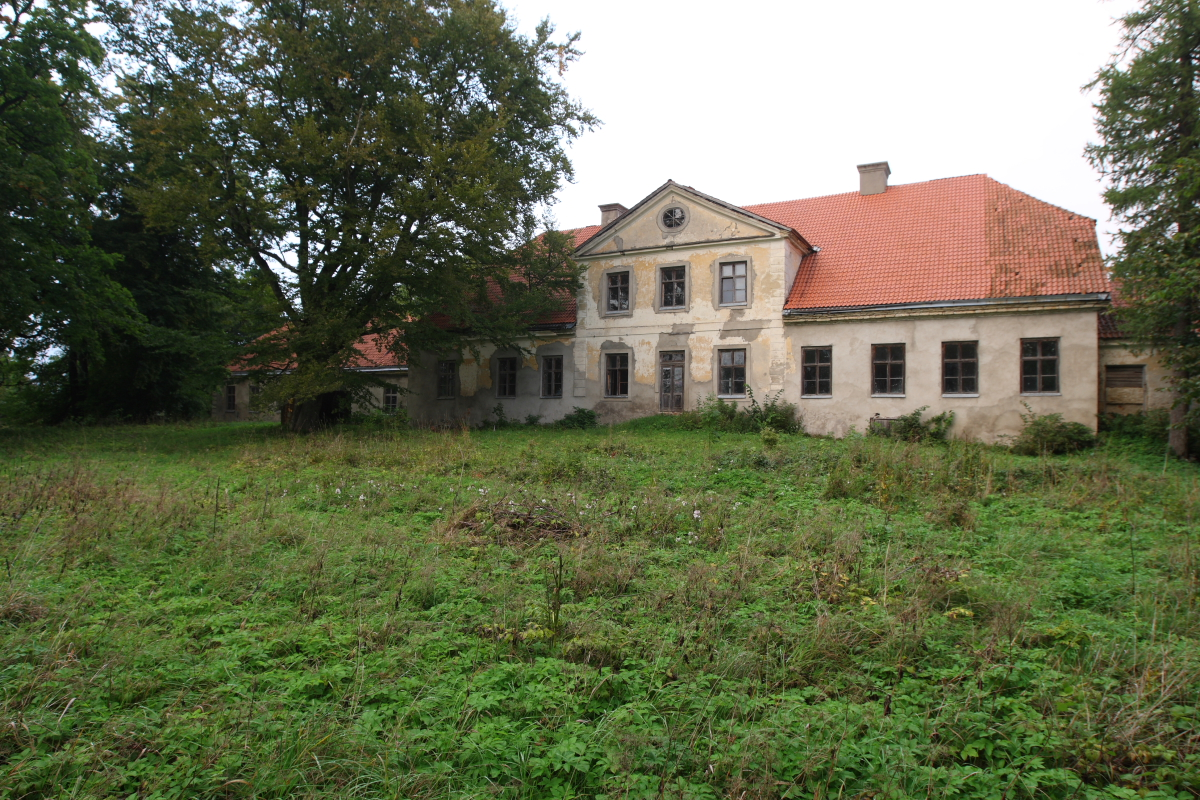
The old Matsalu Manor in Matsalu Village

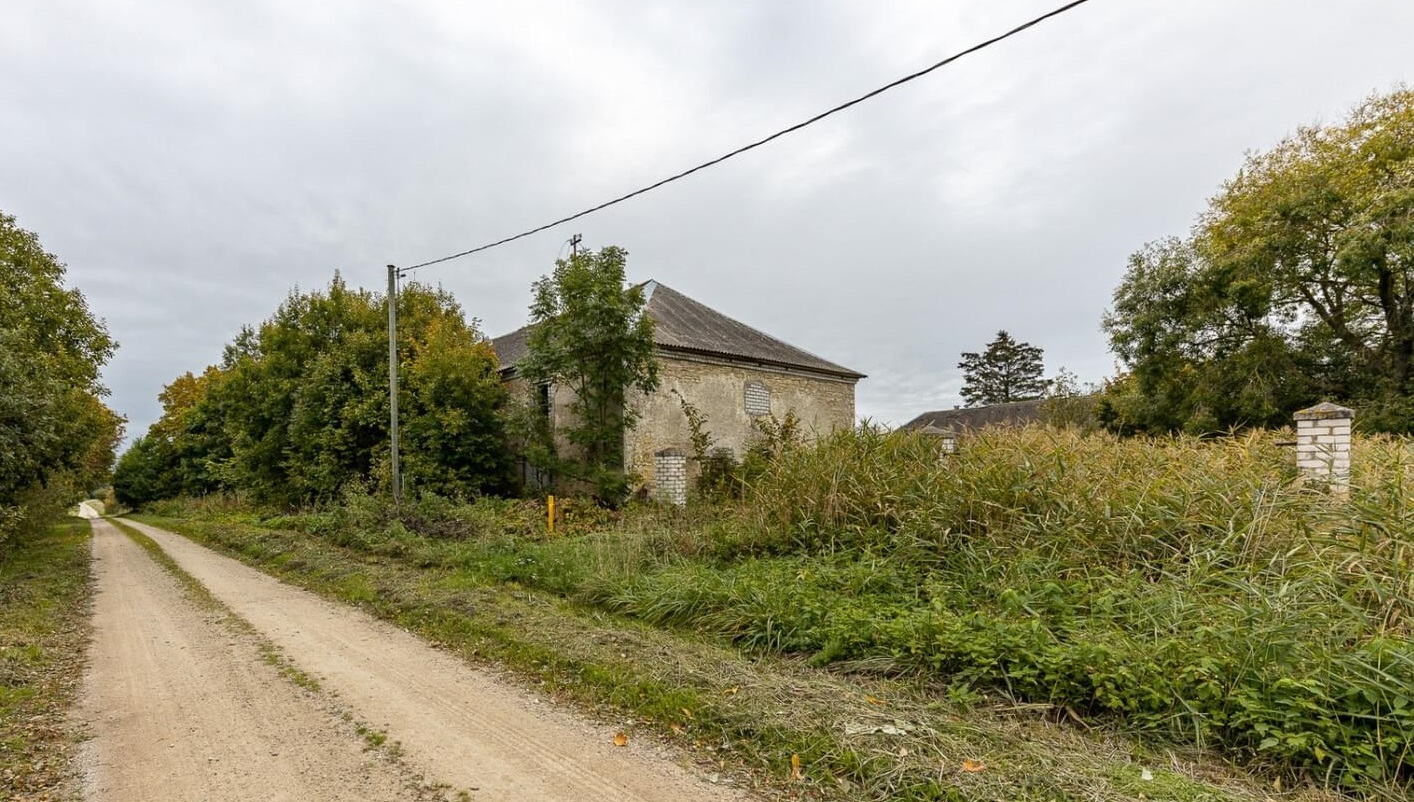
Abandoned 19th-century vodka distillery near the manor

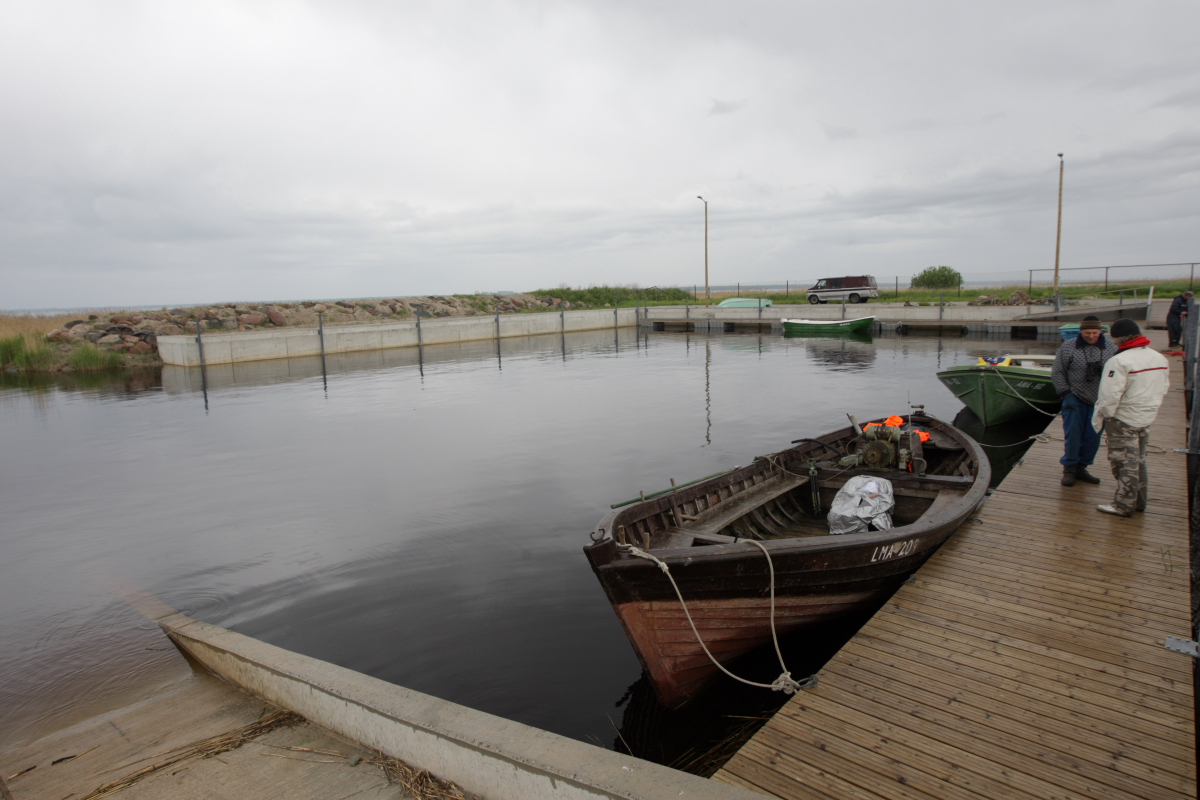
The small port of Keemu

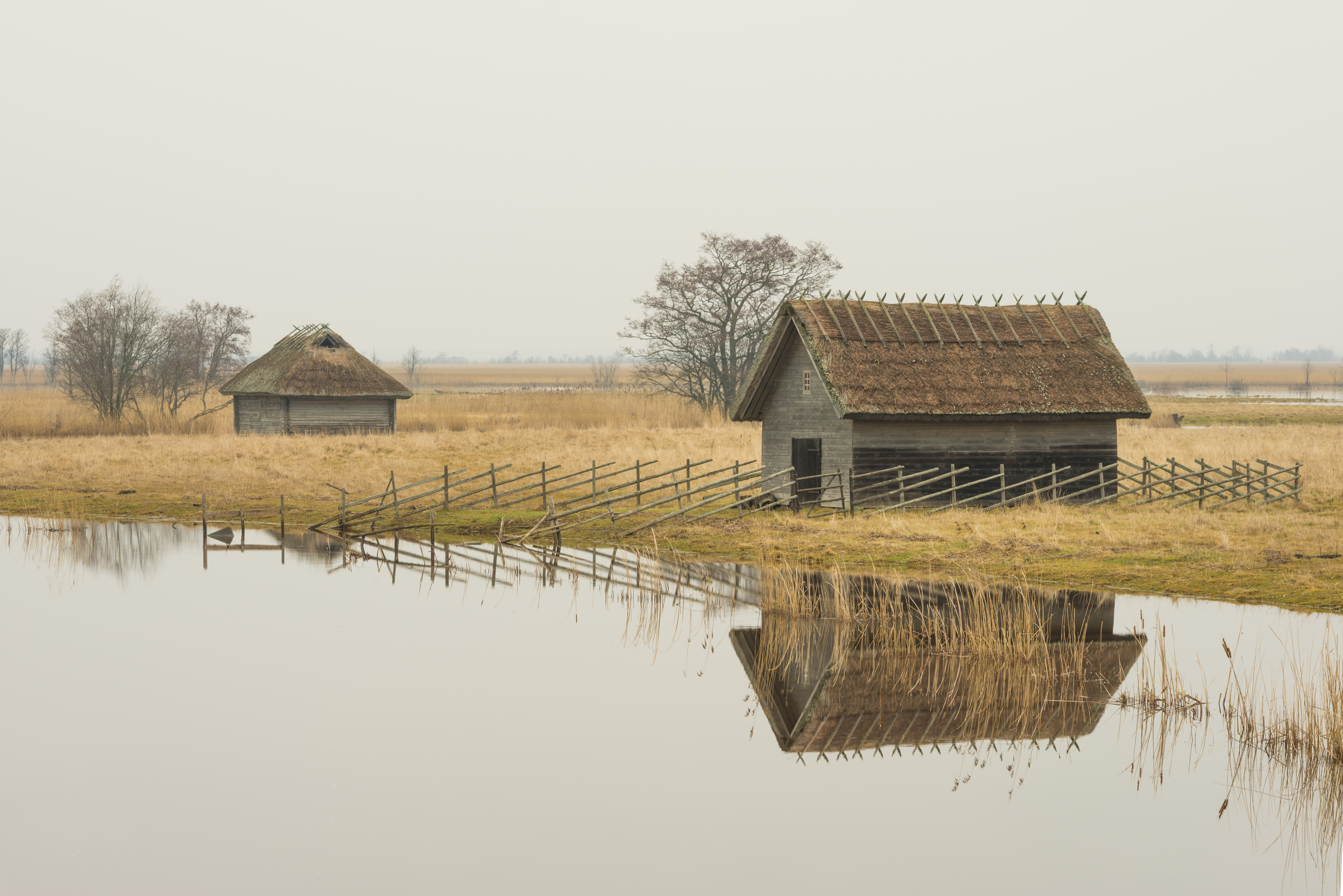
Net and fishing huts on the Tuudi River

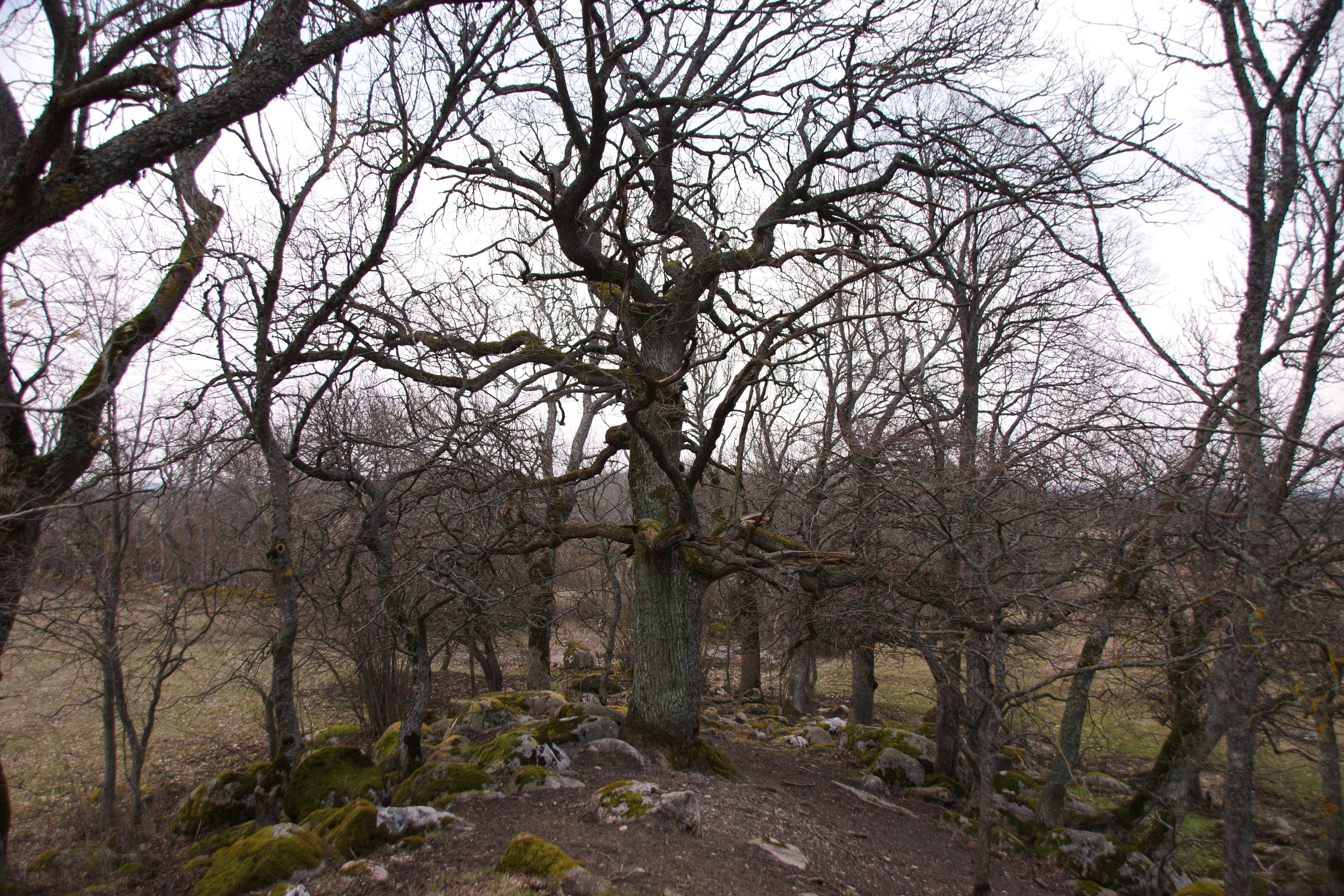
Porimägi

== See also ==
- Protected areas of Estonia
- Lääne County
- List of national parks in the Baltics
- List of protected areas of Estonia
- List of Ramsar sites in Estonia
