= Suurrahu =

Island in Estonia

- Interactive map of Suurrahu

Geography
- Location: Matsalu Bay (Väinameri)
- Coordinates: 58°46′8.08″N 23°39′59.8″E
- Area: 0.1248 ha (0.308 acres)
- Coastline: 1.5 km (0.93 mi)

Administration
- Estonia
- County: Lääne County
- Municipality: Haapsalu
- Settlement: Haeska village

Demographics
- Population: 0

Suurrahu (also known as Haeskarahu and Suurerahu; Swedish: Näckman; German: Neckmans-Grund) is a 0.1248 ha (0.308 acres) uninhabited Estonian islet in Matsalu Bay (part of the Väinameri Sea), on the territory of the Matsalu National Park. Administratively Suurrahu belongs to the Haeska village in Haapsalu municipality, Lääne County.

The islet is covered by coastal meadow and the coastline by reed bed.
