= Haeska, Lääne County =

Village in Estonia

Coordinates: 58°48′N 23°40′E

Haeska
- Village
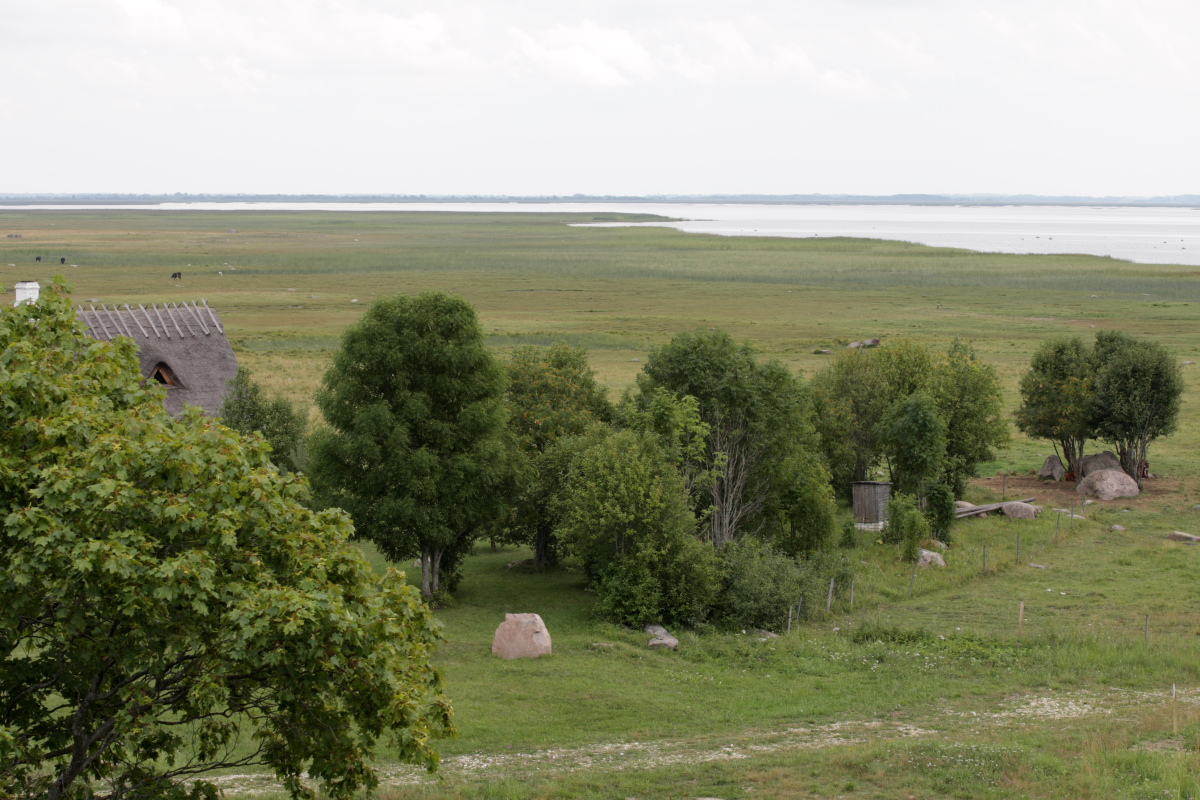
- Beach at Haeska
- Interactive map of Haeska
- Country: Estonia
- Municipality: Haapsalu
- Time zone: UTC+2 (EET)
  - Summer (DST): UTC+3 (EEST)

Haeska (German: Hasik) is a village in Haapsalu municipality, Lääne County, in western Estonia, on the northern coast of the Matsalu Bay (part of the Väinameri). The southern part of the village is covered by the Matsalu National Park. Prior to the 2017 administrative reform of local governments, it was located in Ridala Parish.

The islet of Suurrahu belongs to Haeska village.

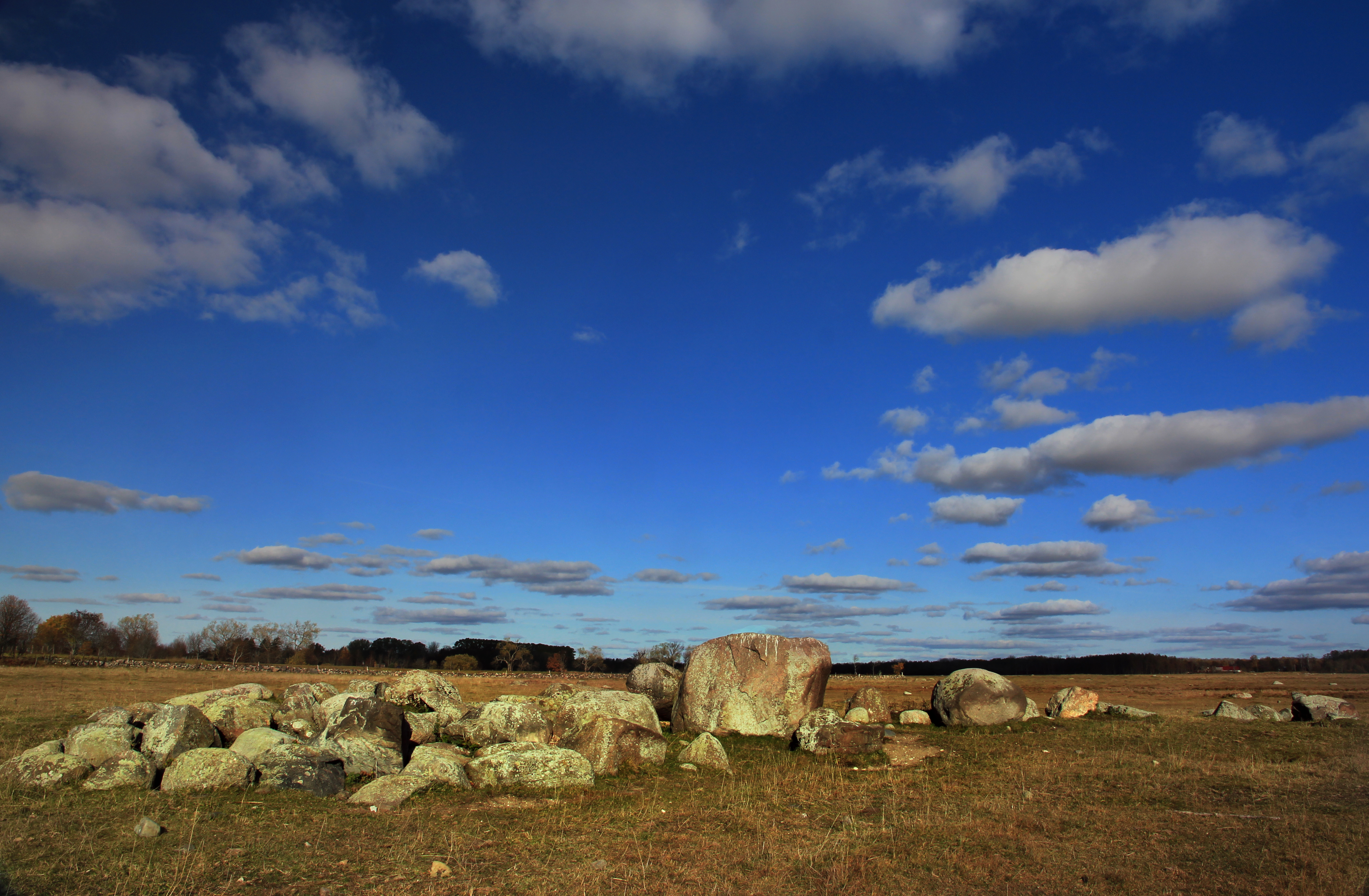
Ridala Parish. Matsalu National Park

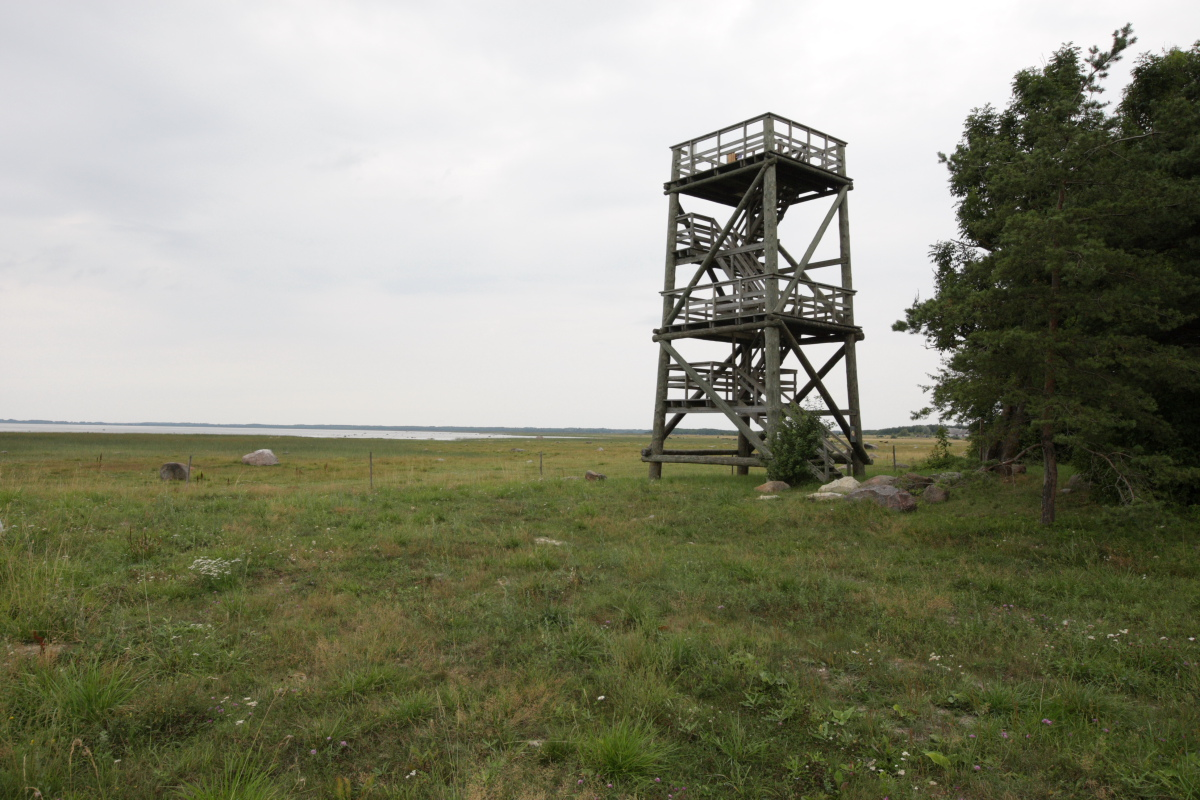
Haeska birdwatching tower
