= Penijõe =

Village in Estonia

Coordinates: 58°43′N 23°49′E

- Village
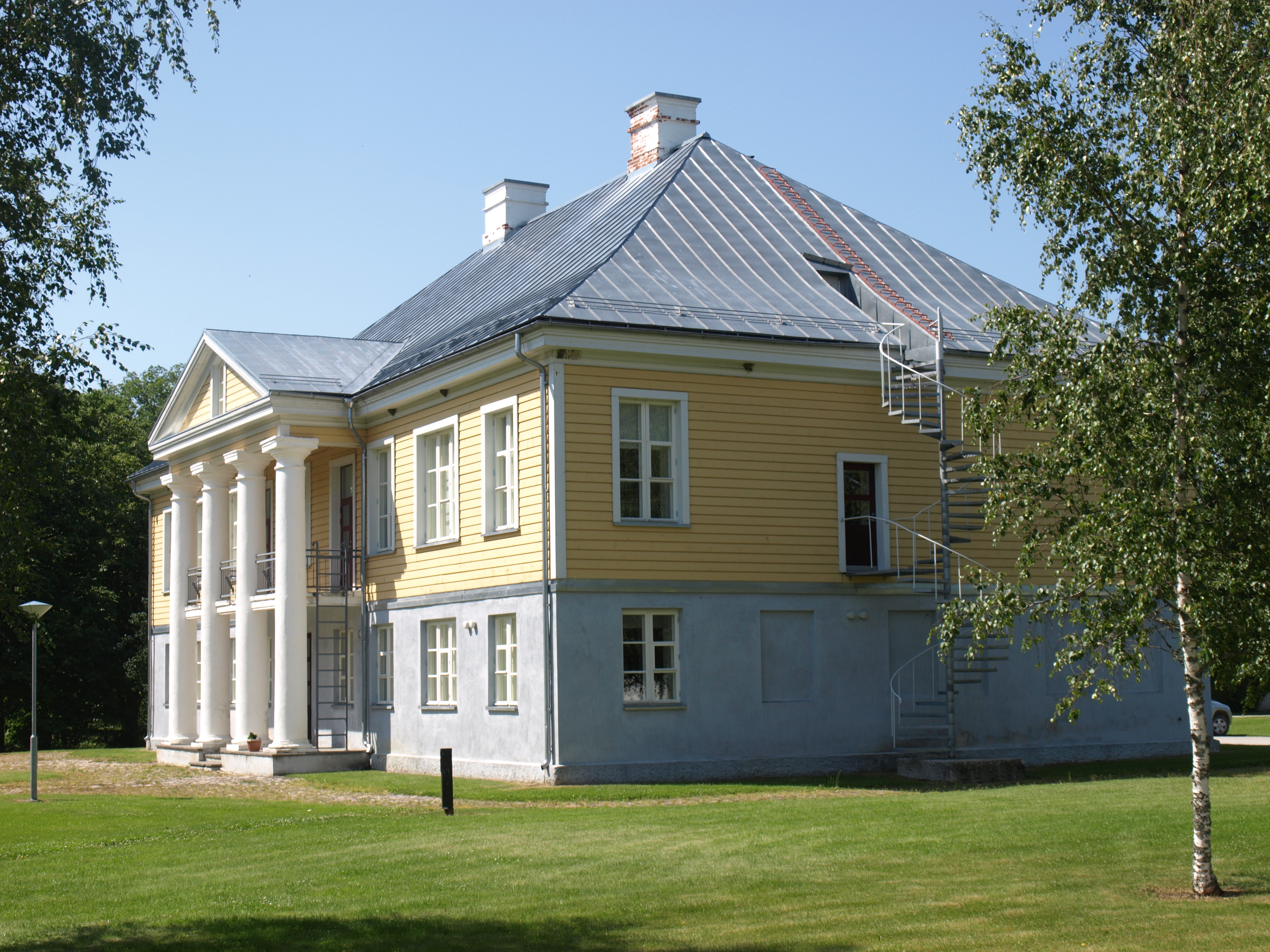
- Penijõe Manor
- Interactive map of Penijõe
- Country: Estonia
- County: Pärnu County
- Parish: Lääneranna Parish
- Time zone: UTC+2 (EET)
  - Summer (DST): UTC+3 (EEST)

Penijõe is a village in Lääneranna Parish, Pärnu County, in western Estonia; in the centre of Matsalu National Park.

== Penijõe Manor ==
Penijõe (German: Pennijöggi) estate was established in the first half of the 17th century. Before the Estonian Declaration of Independence in 1918, the manor had belonged to different Baltic German families. Between 1935 and 1955, the manor housed an agricultural school, and was later divided into flats. In 2000 the building was renovated.

The current building was erected in the first half of the 18th century. In the early 19th century, a second floor and the portico was added and the manor received its current classicist look. The manor is unusual in that the second floor is wooden rather than made of stone.

The manor is located in Matsalu National Park and today houses the Matsalu Nature Centre.

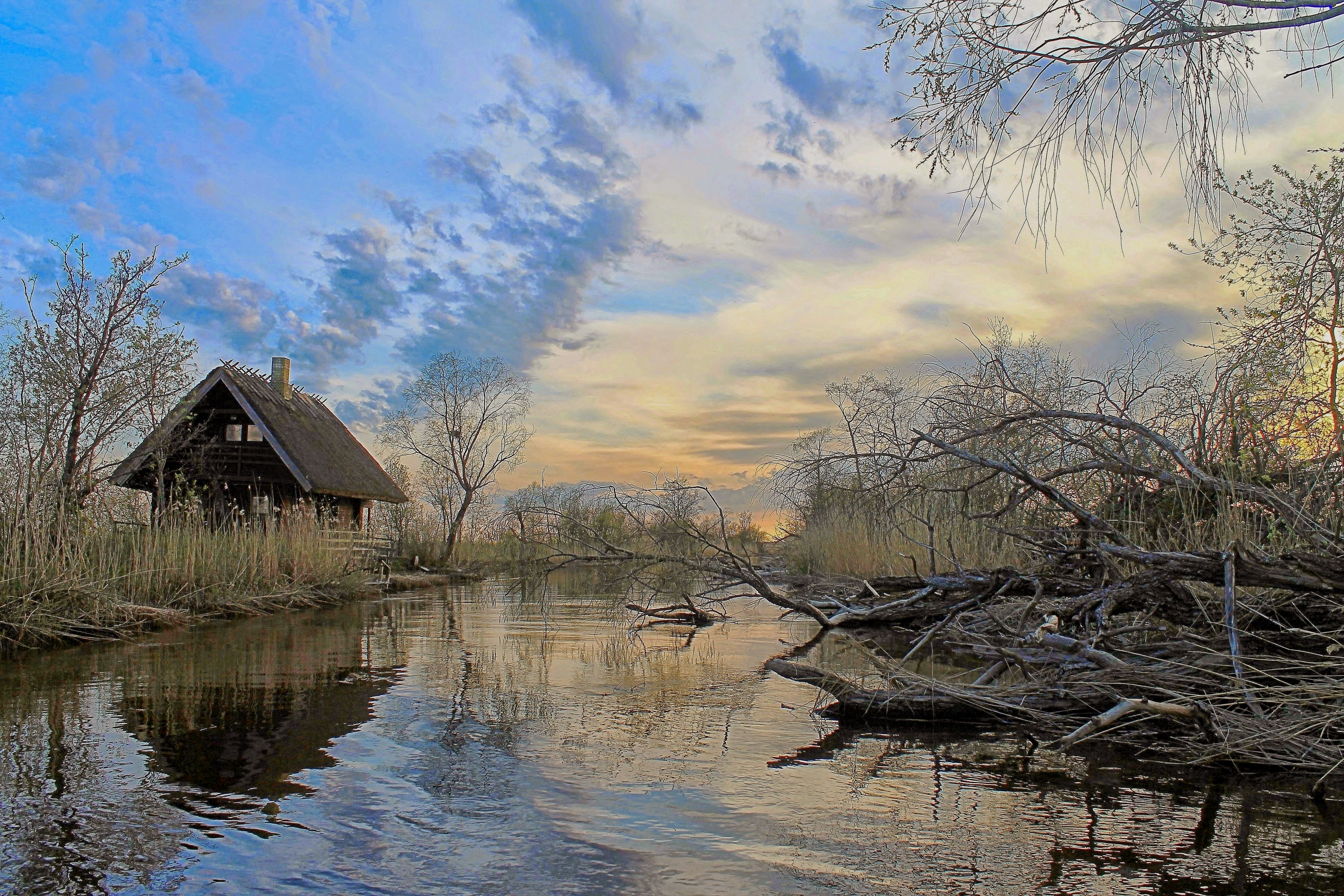
Fishing hut on the Kasari River

== See also ==
- List of palaces and manor houses in Estonia
- Matsalu National Park
