= Eerik Kumari =

Estonian biologist, ornithologist

- Born: Erik Mathias Sits; 7 March 1912; Kirbla, Lihula Parish, Estonia
- Died: 8 January 1984 (aged 71); Tartu, Estonia
- Known for: Nature conservation in Estonia
- Awards: Medal of Merit of the University of Jyväskylä (1975), Estonian Republic Science Prize (1994, posthumous)
- Scientific career
- Fields: Ornithology
- Workplaces: Estonian Academy of Sciences

Eerik Kumari born Erik Mathias Sits (7 March 1912 – 8 January 1984) was a biologist, and pioneer of ornithology and nature conservation in Estonia. He was born in Kirbla, Lihula Parish. He was the director of the Institute of Zoology and Botany at the Estonian Academy of Sciences from 1952 to 1977. He was the president of the Estonian Naturalists' Society from 1954 to 1964.

The Eerik Kumari Award was established in 1989 in his name to honor those who have excelled in biology in Estonia.
