= Kloostri =

Village in Estonia

- Village
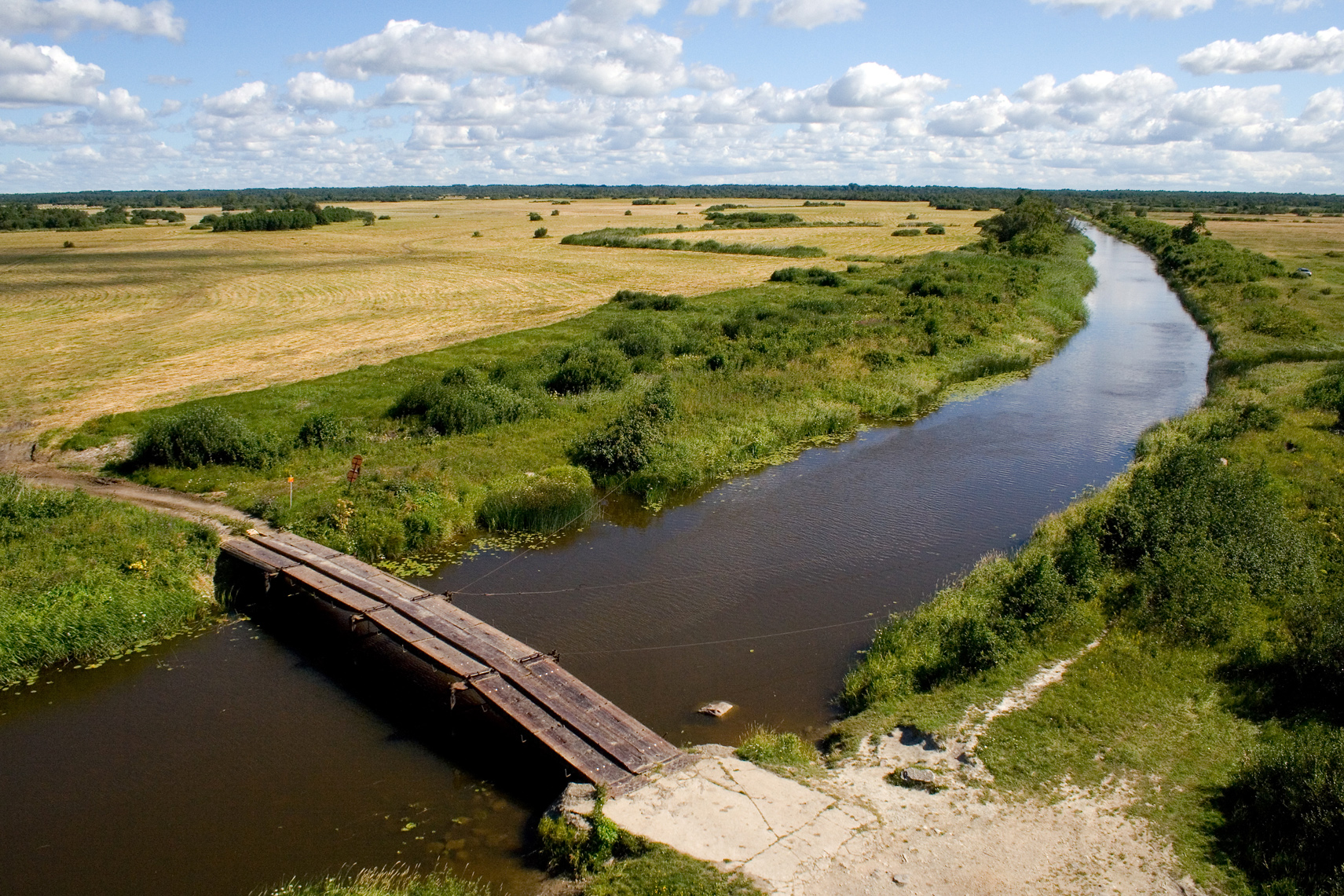
- View of Kloostri meadow and bridge over Kasari River
- Interactive map of Kloostri
- Coordinates: 58°44′20″N 23°49′52″E
- Country: Estonia
- County: Pärnu County
- Parish: Lääneranna Parish
- Time zone: UTC+2 (EET)
  - Summer (DST): UTC+3 (EEST)

Kloostri (German: Klosterhof) is a village in Lääneranna Parish, Pärnu County, in western Estonia.

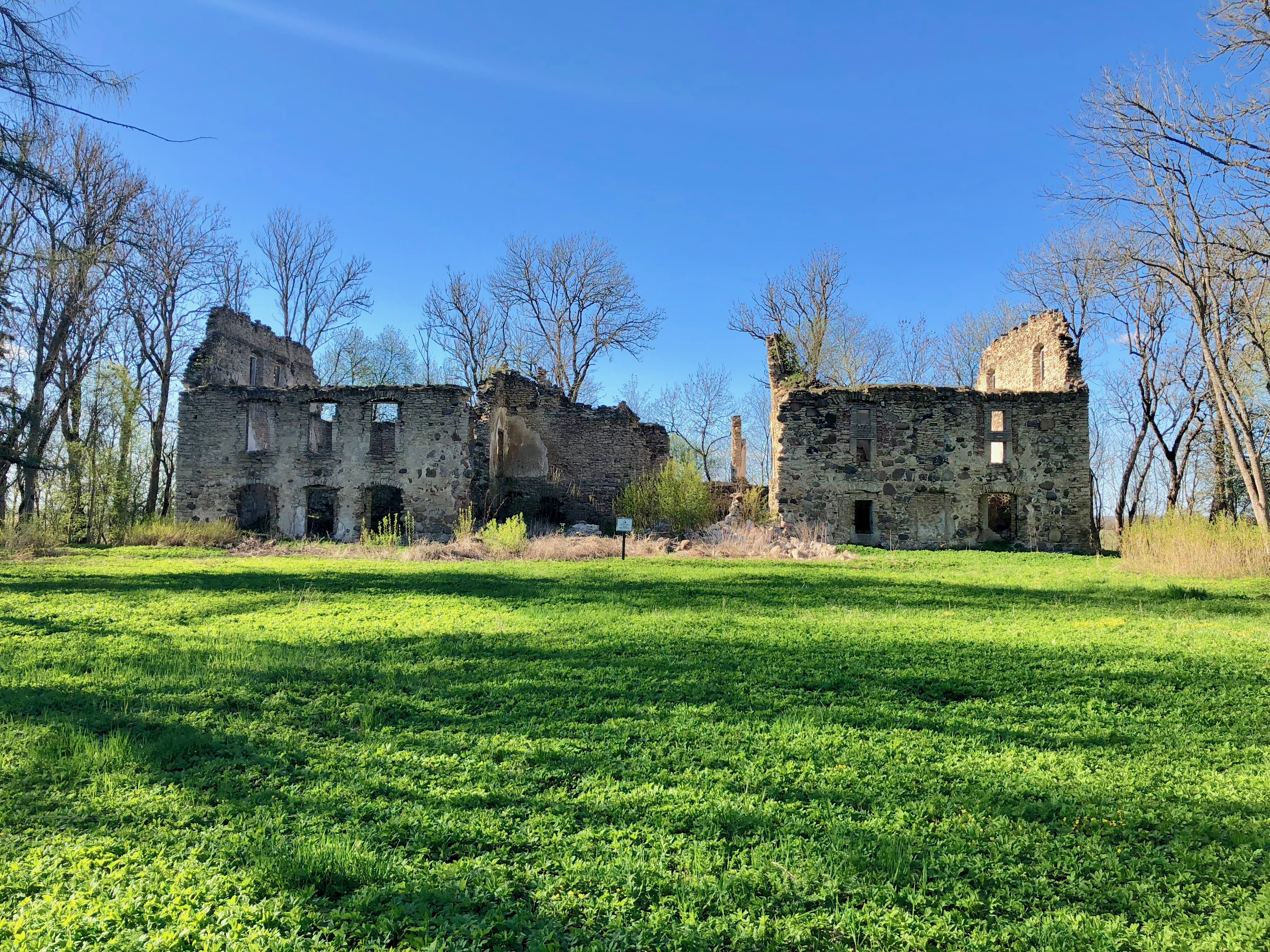
Ruins of Kloostri Manor, built in the 13th century
