= Kasari (river) =

River in Estonia

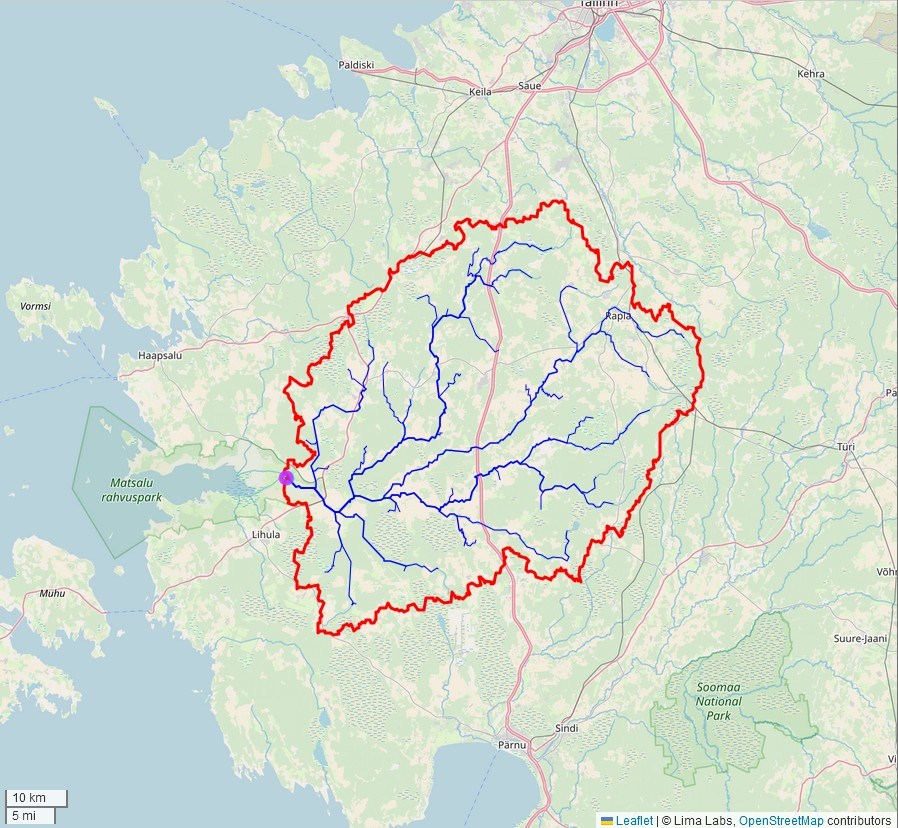
- Map of the Kasari River watershed (Interactive map)

Location
- Country: Estonia

Physical characteristics
- Source
  - location: near Hagudi
- Mouth
  - location: Matsalu Bay, Väinameri, Baltic Sea
  - coordinates: 58.765°N 23.741°E
  - elevation: 0 m
- Length: 112 km (70 mi)
- Basin size: 3,210 km^{2} (1,240 sq mi)
- Discharge
  - average: 23–28 m^{3}/s (810–990 cu ft/s)

The Kasari is a river in western Estonia that drains into Matsalu Bay, which is part of Väinameri. A 308-metre-long pedestrian bridge was built over it in 1904, and it was the longest concrete bridge in Europe at the time. The river itself is 112 km long, and is the fourth-longest river in Estonia. The river is a home to a variety of fish, including pike and roach.

== Gallery ==
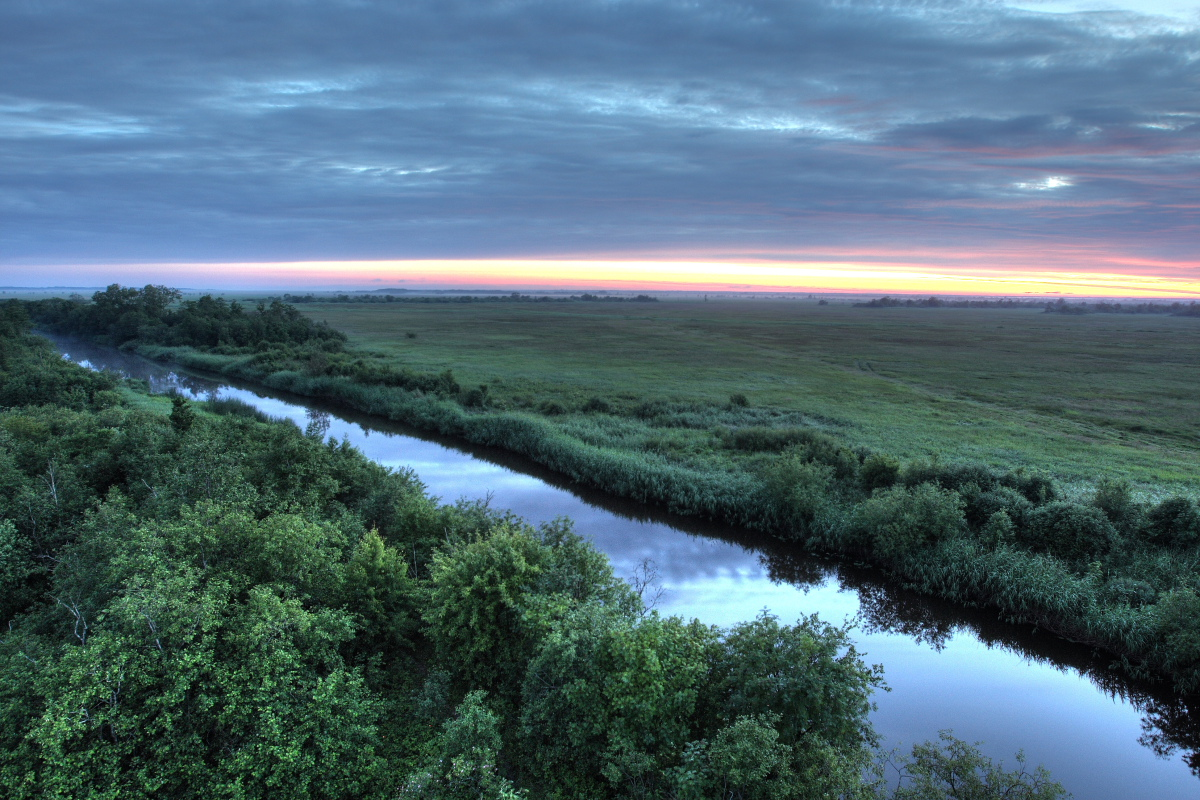
The Kasari River

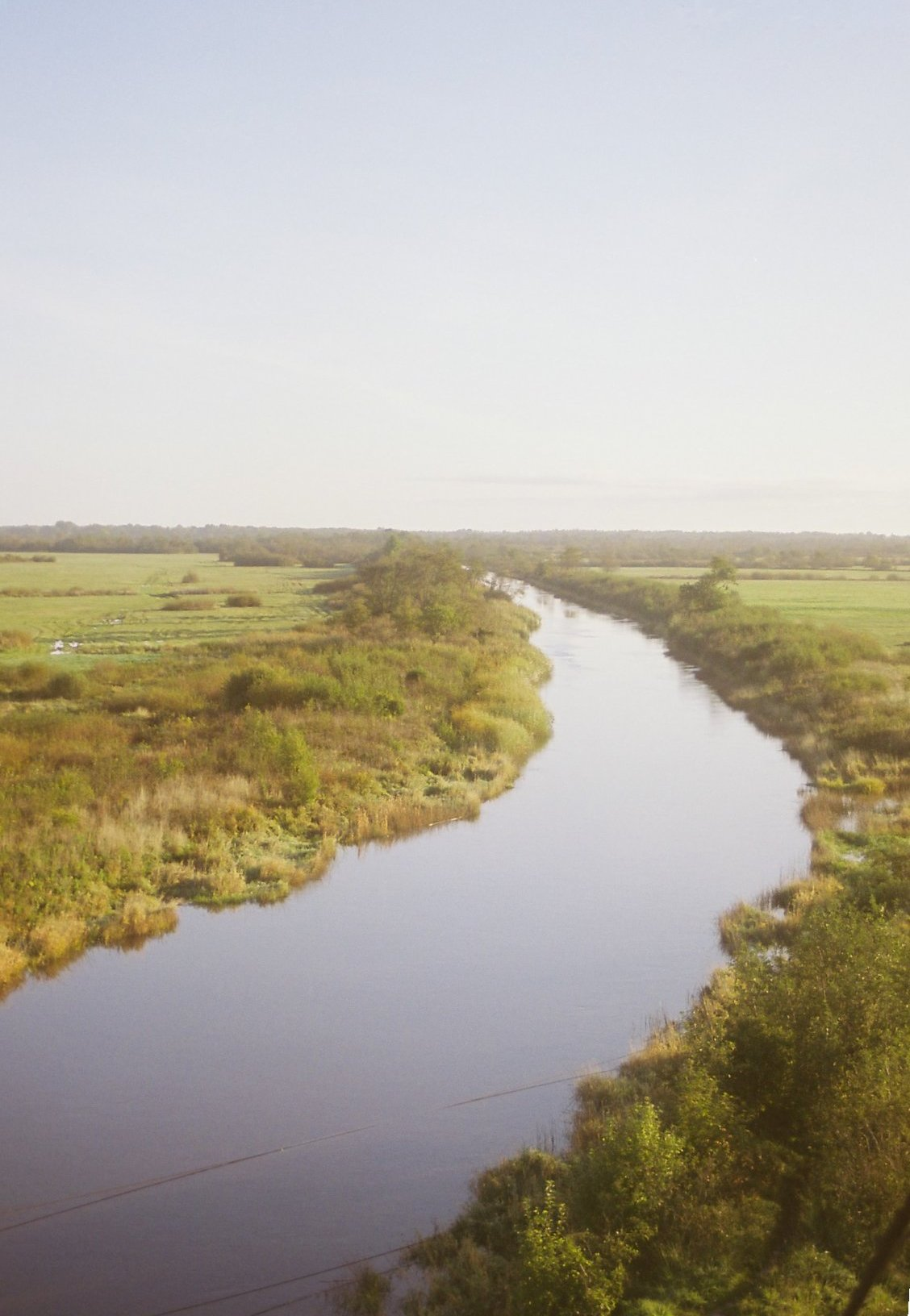
The Kasari on its lower course

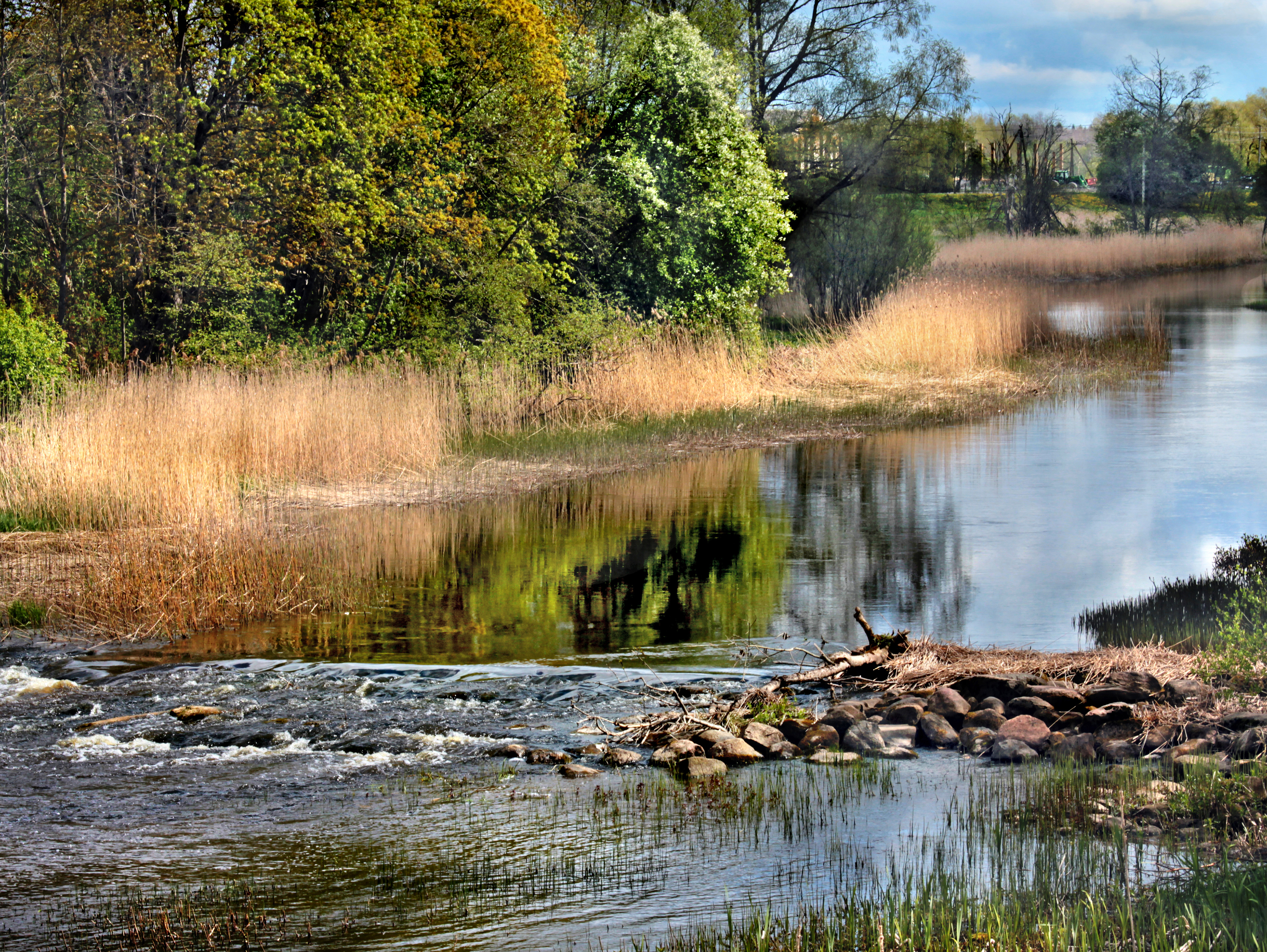
Riffle on the Kasari River

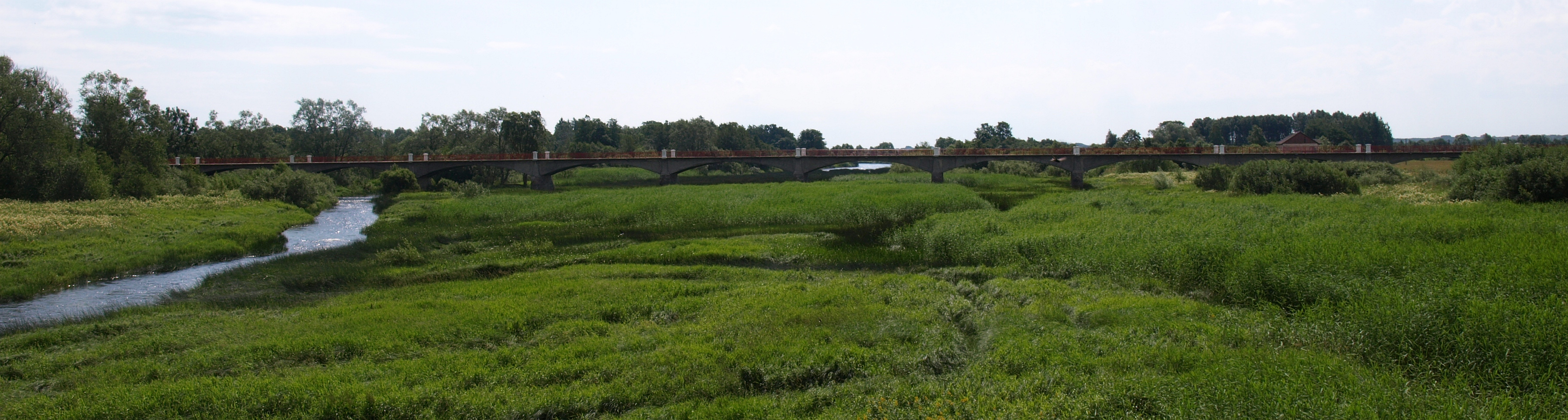
The historic Kasari Bridge

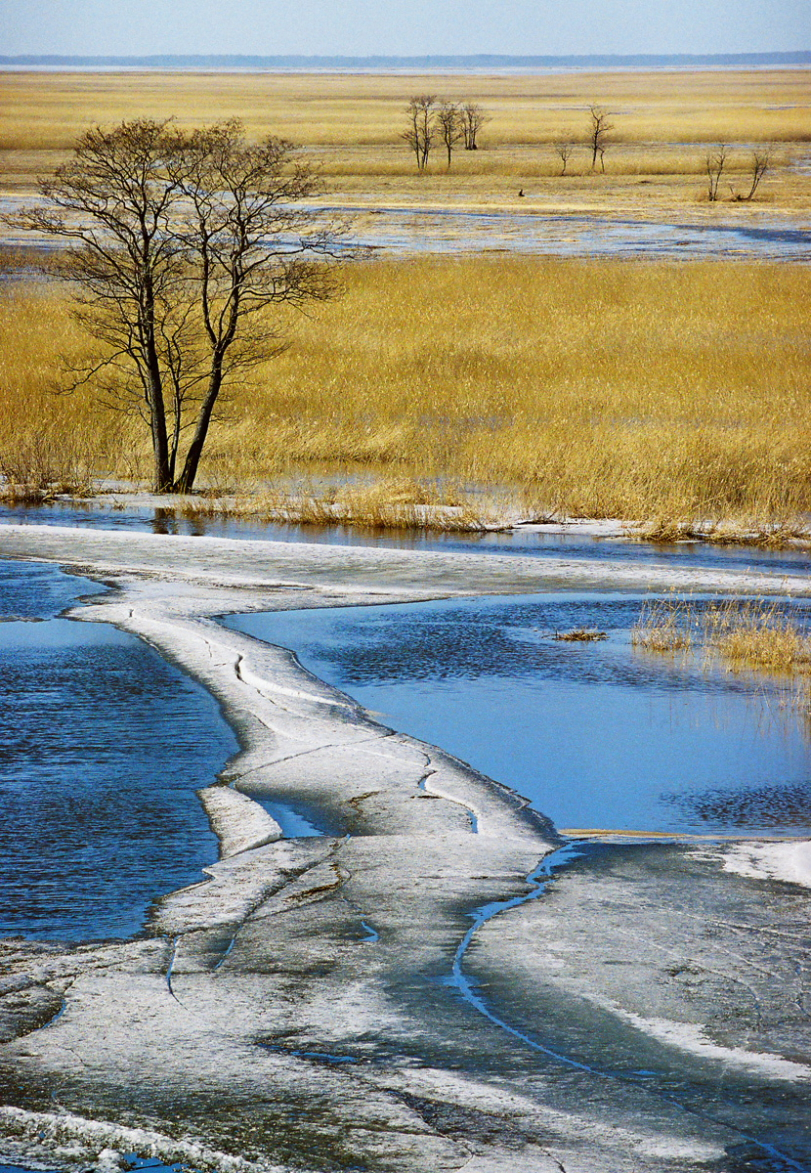
The Kasari flood-meadow in spring at Matsalu National Park
