= Keemu =

Village in Estonia

- Village
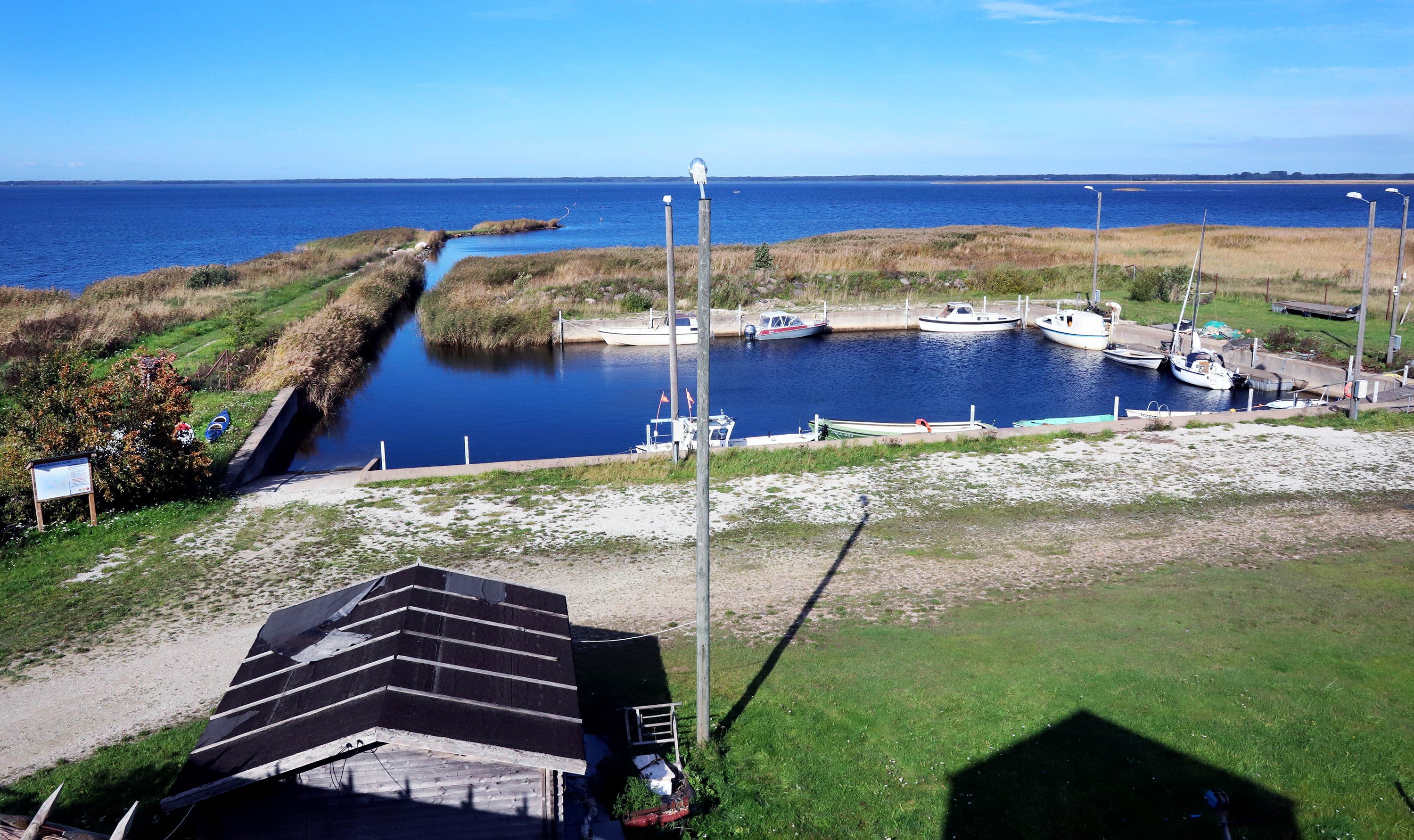
- Keemu harbour

- Location within Estonia
- Coordinates: 58.73944°N 23.67167°E
- Country: Estonia
- County: Pärnu County
- Parish: Lääneranna Parish
- Time zone: UTC+2 (EET)
  - Summer (DST): UTC+3 (EEST)

Keemu is a village in Lääneranna Parish, Pärnu County in Estonia.
