= Matsalu Bay =

Bay in Estonia

Coordinates: 58°45′36″N 23°35′49″E

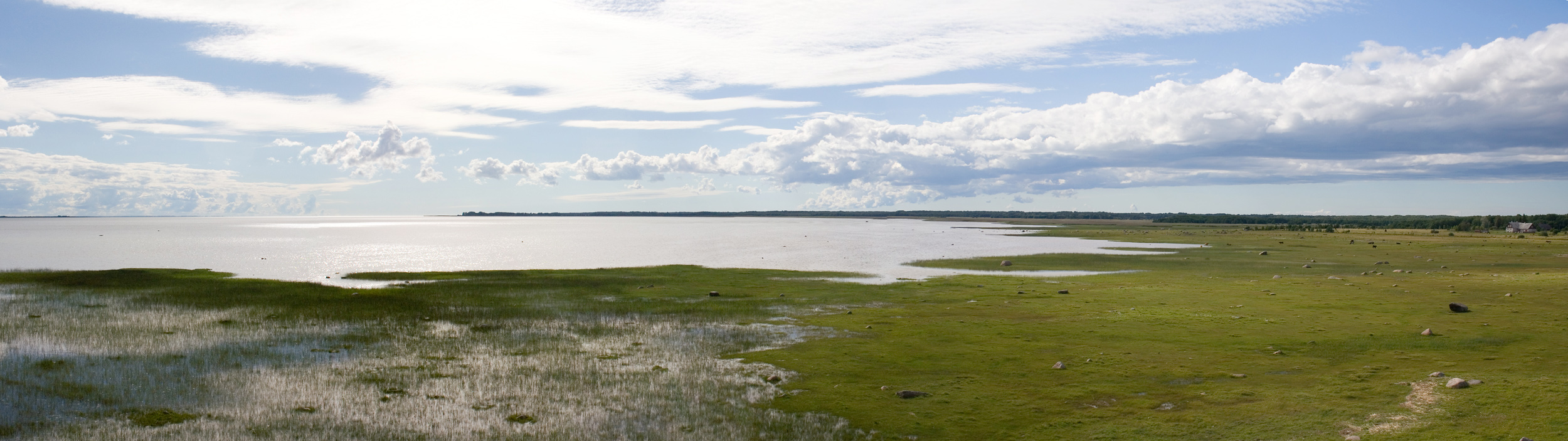
Matsalu Bay

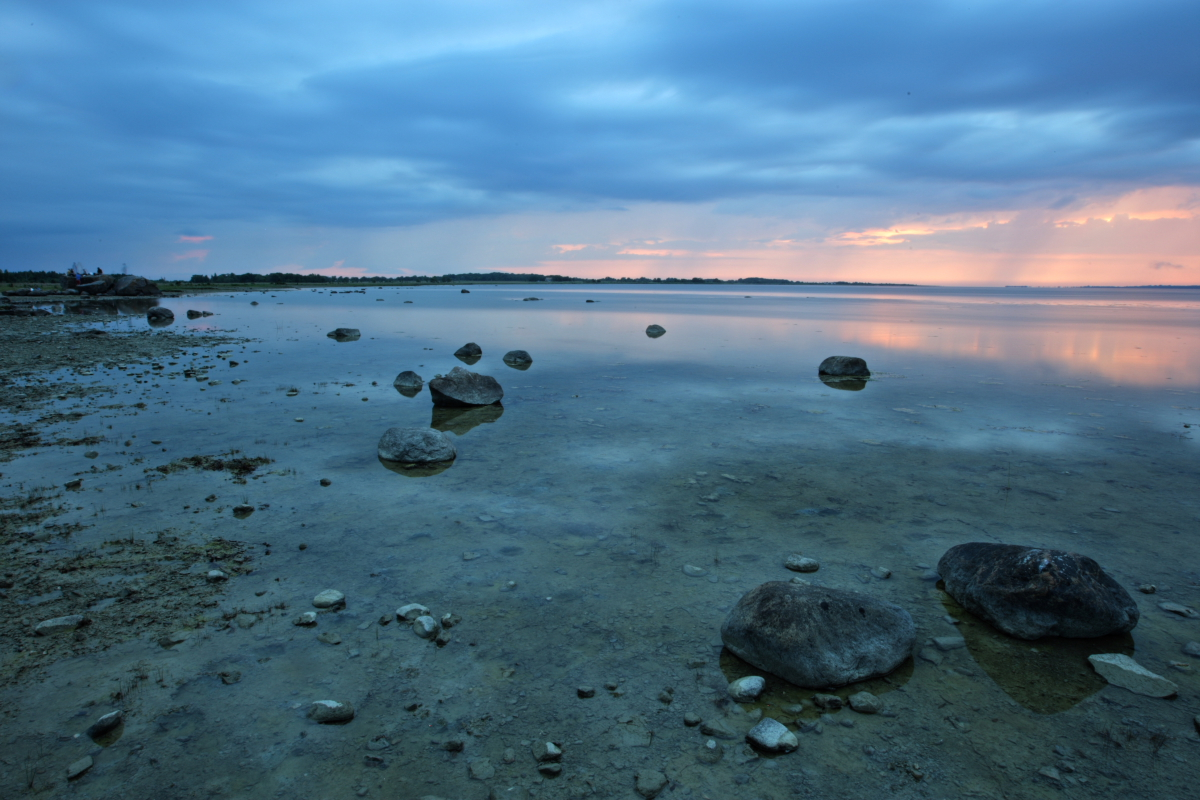
Matsalu Bay

Matsalu Bay (Estonian: Matsalu laht) is a bay in Lääne County, Estonia; the bay is part of Väinameri.

The bay's area is 67 km2.

The bay and its coast area is under protection (Matsalu National Park).

The bay is one of the most important wetland bird areas in Europe, due to its prime position on the East Atlantic Flyway. Large numbers of migratory birds use Matsalu as a staging area. Every spring over two million waterfowl pass Matsalu, of which around 1.6 million are long-tailed ducks.
