= Matsalu =

Village in Estonia

Coordinates: 58°44′N 23°42′E

- Village
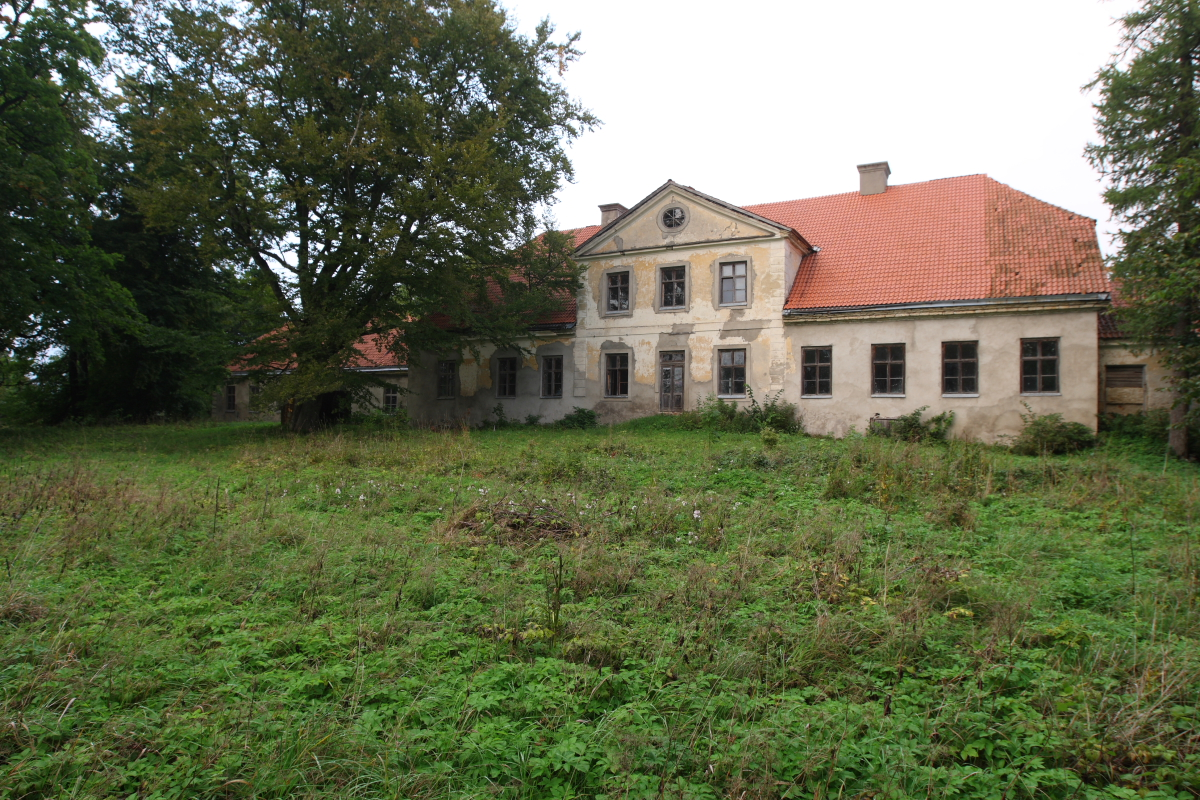
- Matsalu Manor
- Interactive map of Matsalu
- Country: Estonia
- County: Pärnu County
- Parish: Lääneranna Parish
- Time zone: UTC+2 (EET)
  - Summer (DST): UTC+3 (EEST)

Matsalu (German: Matzal) is a village in Lääneranna Parish, Pärnu County in western Estonia, surrounding the old Matsalu Manor.

The Estonian company which owns the manor house was managed from the late 1990s till the late 2010s by a Swedish American, C. J. Stefan Ridderstedt of Stockholm (1945-2020).
