= Dammann =

Dammann is a surname. Notable people with the surname include:

- Anna Dammann (1912–1993), German actress
- Bill Dammann (1872–1948), American baseball pitcher
- Dirk Dammann (born 1967), German footballer
- Erik Dammann (1931–2025), Norwegian environmentalist and government scholar, and author
- Gerhard Dammann (1883–1946), German film actor
- Hans Dammann (1867–1942), German sculptor
- Herman Dammann (1888–1968), American farmer and politician
- Paul-Marcel Dammann (1885–1939), French engraver and medalist
- Theodore Dammann, American politician
