= Robert Stock (disambiguation) =

Robert Stock (born 1989) is an American baseball pitcher. Other notable people with this name include:

- Robert Stock (businessman) (1858–1912), German entrepreneur and telecommunications pioneer
- Robert Stock (tennis) (born 1944), American tennis player

== See also ==
- Stock (surname)
