= Gregor von Bochmann =

Baltic-German painter

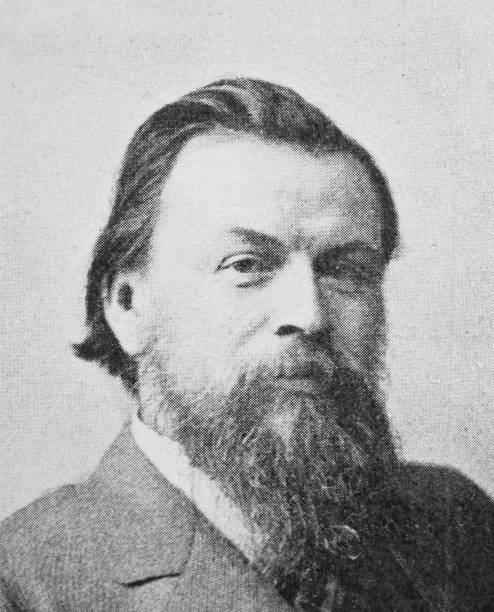
- Gregor von Bochmann1 in 1890
- Born: 1 June 1850; Nehatu, Kreis Wiek, Governorate of Estonia
- Died: 12 February 1930 (aged 79); Hösel, near Düsseldorf
- Education: Gustav Adolf Grammar School (1862-1868)
- Style: Landscape, genre
- Spouse: Emilie Poensgen (from 1877)

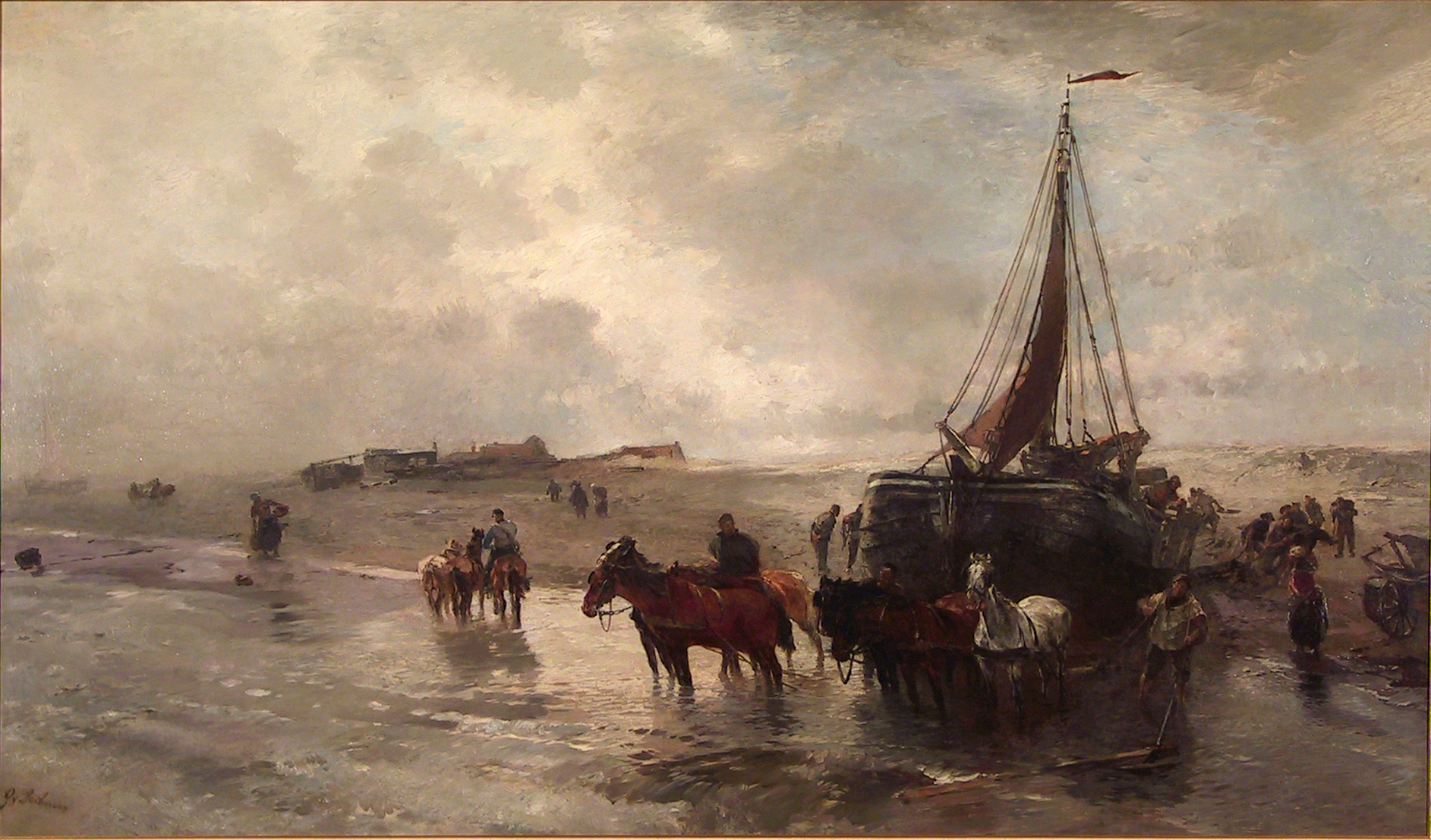
Launching a Fishing Boat in Holland (1888)

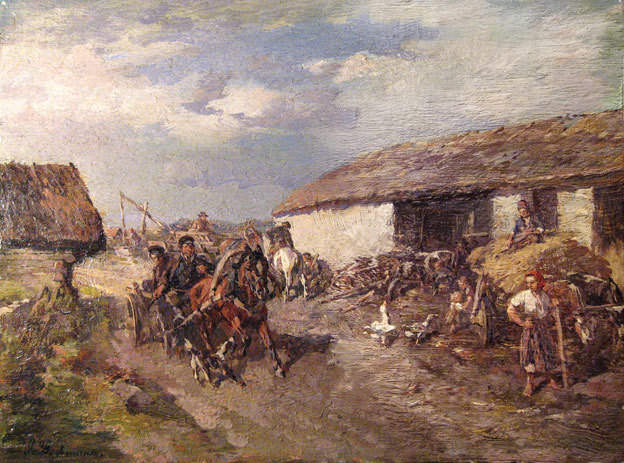
Estonian Village Road (1890s)

Gregor von Bochmann (1 June 1850 – 12 February 1930) was a Baltic-German landscape and genre painter. Buchman was popular during his lifetime due to his regular participation in exhibitions and his stunning early works.After his death, in 1930 and 1951, memorial exhibitions were organized in his honor. However, apart from the constant presence of his paintings in the international art trade, interest in him remained limited. This changed at the beginning of the 21st century, with exhibitions held in Düsseldorf and Estonia.

== Biography ==
He was born in Nehatu, Kreis Wiek, Governorate of Estonia. His father was a forest warden for the Governorate of Estonia, who had been ennobled due to his service in the Crimean War. Bochmann frequently travelled around the country with him, developing his ability to observe nature. From 1862 to 1868, he studied at the Gustav Adolf Grammar School in Tallinn, where his art teacher, Theodor Albert Sprengel, recognized his talent and obtained a scholarship for him to study at the Kunstakademie Düsseldorf.

After studying drawing and antiquities, he attended the landscape class of Oswald Achenbach and, after graduation in 1871, established his own studios nearby. Further study trips were made to Holland, Belgium and his native Estonia and the sketches he made there served as the basis for much of his later work. In 1877, he married Emilie Poensgen, the daughter of industrialist Julius Poensgen, an iron and steel manufacturer. Their children included the sculptor, Gregor von Bochmann, known as "The Younger".

He exhibited widely, throughout Germany and Austria and, notably, at the Exposition Universelle (1878), and received numerous awards. In 1893, he became a member of the Academy of Arts, Berlin and, two years later, was awarded the title of "Royal Prussian Professor". In 1899, he was granted his own title of nobility by Kaiser Wilhelm II.

Bochmann was a member of the Freie Vereinigung Düsseldorfer Künstler and, as such, one of the first Secessionists. He also served on the board of the Deutscher Künstlerbund.

He died in 1930 in Hösel, near Düsseldorf.

== Art work ==
Buchman's main works include "The Estonian Market" (around 1870), "The Reapers" (after 1870), "Sunday at a Church in Estonia" (1874), "Potato Harvest in Estonia" (1876),"Shipyard in South Holland" (1878), "Fish Market in Reval" (1886), "Abandoned" (1904), and "The Ships Are Coming" (1907), "The Mussel Fishermen" (1918).
