= Leopold Fleischhacker =

German sculptor and medallist

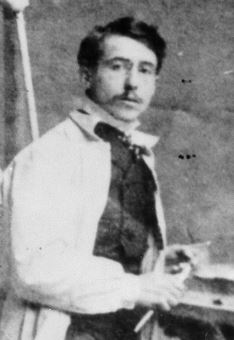
Leopold Fleischhacker (date unknown)

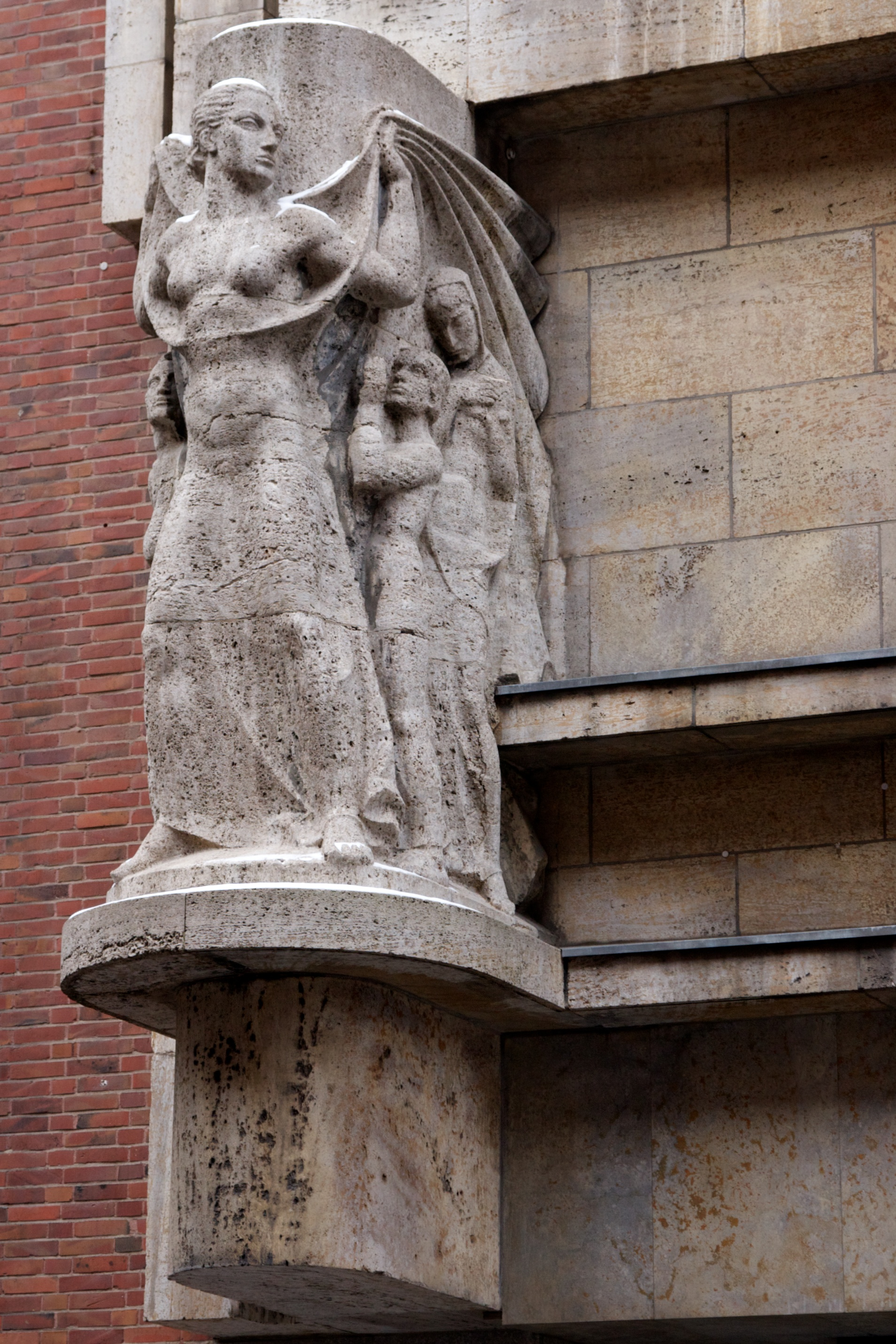
Ornament at Kasernenstraße 61, Düsseldorf

Leopold Fleischhacker (13 May 1882, Felsberg - 11 September 1946, Uccle) was a German sculptor and medallist of Jewish ancestry.

== Life and work ==
From 1897 to 1902, he attended the Kunstgewerbeschule Düsseldorf where he studied with Clemens Buscher. In his spare time, he took lessons at stucco workshops and qualified as a journeyman plasterer. Then, from 1903 to 1905, he attended the Prussian Academy of Arts, where his primary instructors were Ernst Herter and Peter Breuer. In 1905, he was awarded a scholarship by the Michael Beer Foundation that enabled him to spend eight months in Rome at the Villa Strohl-Fern.

In 1906, he returned to Düsseldorf; serving as an assistant in the studios of August Bauer––. After 1909, he was a regular participant in the exhibitions of the artists' association in Barmen. In 1912, he opened his first studio in a room at the home of a decorative painter named August Blumenberg, where the sculptor, Franz Linden also had a studio. In 1919, he had a showing at the first exhibition of a new artists' association called Young Rhineland and moved into his own, private studio.

He presented entries in competitions for several war memorials, including Elberfeld (1921) and Düren (1928). For the southern wall of the Great Synagogue in Düsseldorf, he designed a memorial in honor of its fallen community members. In 1926, he created reliefs for the "Hygiene of the Jews“ pavilion at the "GeSoLei", a trade fair. They were later displayed at the headquarters of the Jewish Community Center, but were destroyed in 1938.

Until 1931, he was a member of Malkasten, a progressive artists' association. In 1933, as a Jew, he was denied membership in the Reichskammer der bildenden Künste by the Reich Chamber of Culture, effectively banning him from his profession. From that point on, he was only able to work for Jewish customers and created mostly funerary art.

In 1938, during the pogrom known as "Kristallnacht", his studio in the Flingern District was destroyed. His wife, Lotte, fled to live with friends in Cologne. Eventually, they both managed to emigrate to Belgium and settled in Uccle, where he worked for a ceramics factory. In 1945, he was able to reopen a studio, in Brussels, but died the following year.
