= August Bauer =

German sculptor

August Bauer (14 November 1868 – 9 August 1961) was a German sculptor.

== Life ==
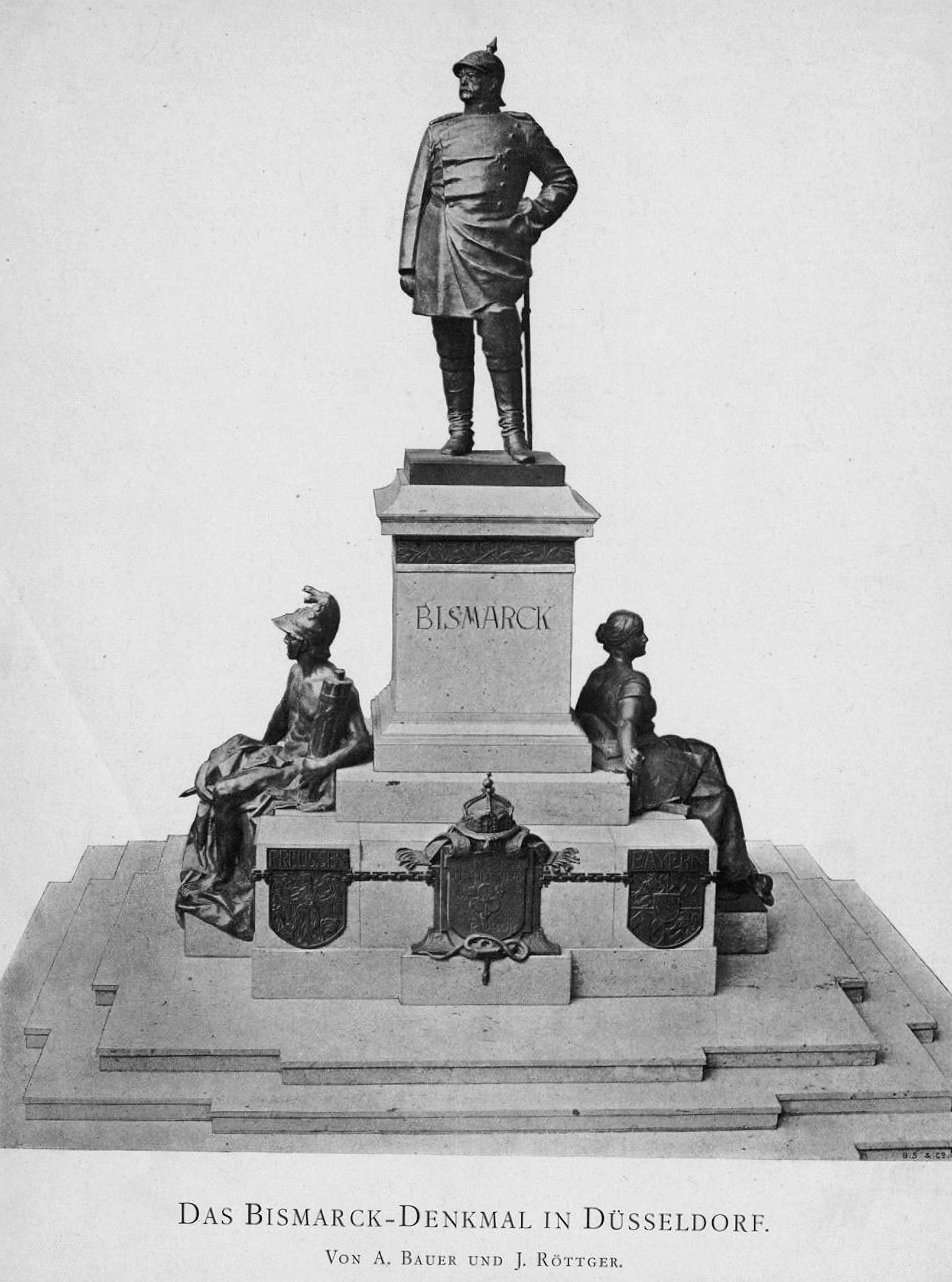
Bismarck-Denkmal in Düsseldorf (1899)

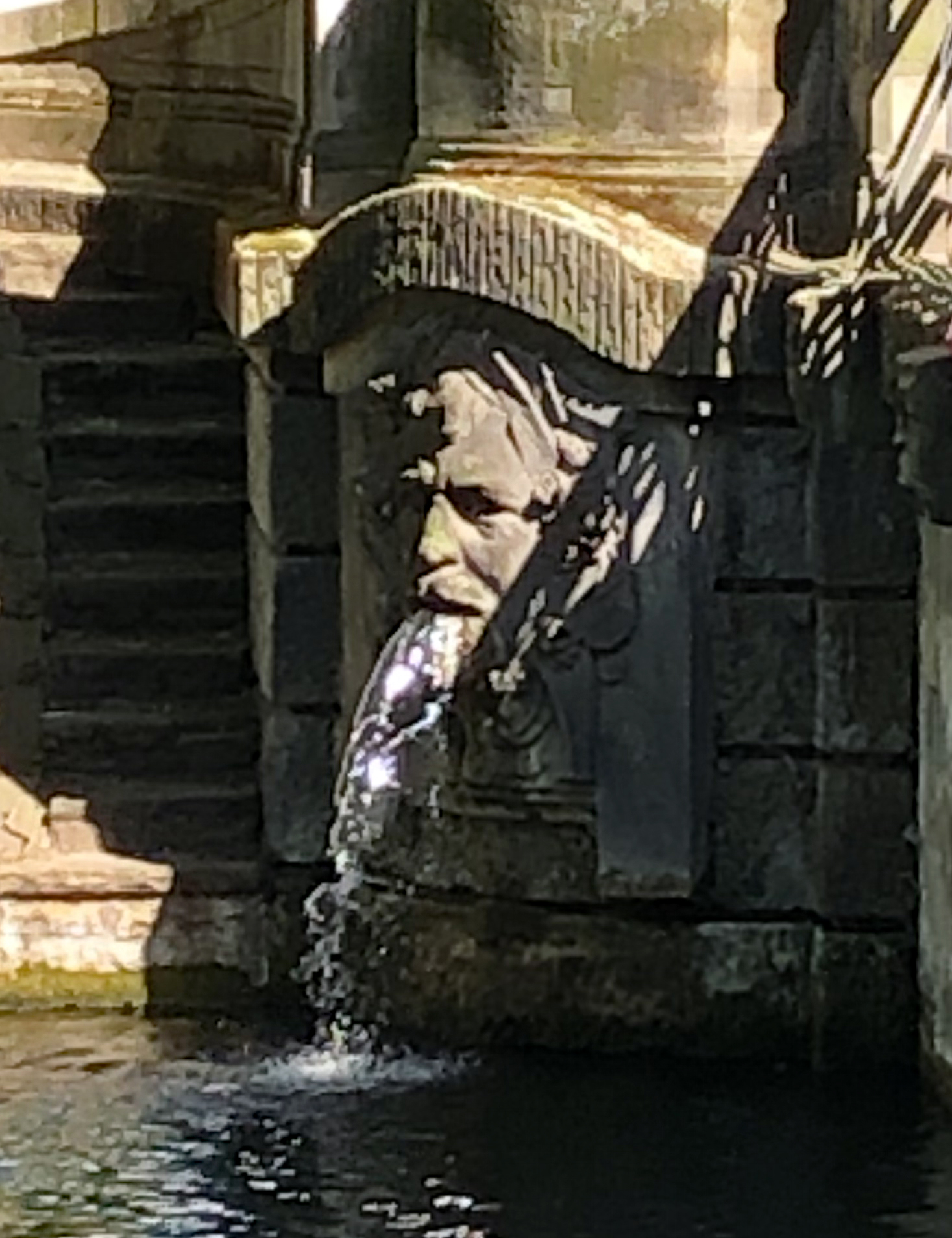
Girardet-Brücke, Wasserspeier an der Girardet-Brücke (2020)

Born in Düsseldorf, Bauer, son of the master carpenter Peter Bauer (1832–1901) and Wilhelmine (1833–1910), attended the Kunstgewerbeschule Düsseldorf from the end of 1886 and took the subjects Holzschnitzerei and ornamental and figural modelling with Clemens Buscher after an apprenticeship with sculptor Gustav Rutz. There, he received a scholarship from the municipal fund for his achievements in the years 1887 to winter 1888/1889. In 1889 Bauer went to Berlin, where he joined the studio of Otto Lessing and at the same time attended the Schule des Kunstgewerbemuseums. From 1892 followed studies at the Prussian Academy of Arts, there under Peter Breuer, Ernst Herter and Gerhard Janensch.

When Bismarck's 80th birthday was approaching in 1895, the "Association of Düsseldorf Citizens for the Erection of a Bismarck Monument in Düsseldorf" was founded on 19 March 1895. It was decided to place the Bismarck-Denkmal within sight of the Kaiser-Wilhelm-Denkmal, which had been inaugurated a few years earlier, in front of the Kunsthalle on Alleestraße. Finally, a general competition was held. By the closing date of the competition on 1 February 1896, a total of 40 designs by 36 artists had been submitted. No first prize was awarded, but the second prize of 3000 German gold marks was awarded to the design by August Bauer and Johannes Röttger from Berlin with the motto "In patria" (For the Fatherland). However, they had to revise the plinth design before they were allowed to start building the monument. Under artistic supervision, Bauer and Röttger amended their sketch and were able to start work on the Bismarck Monument on 18 May 1897. The bronze casting took place at the Kunstgießerei Lauchhammer. The completion and erection of the statue was carried out by the Düsseldorf company "Opderbecke & Neese" taken over from 4 April 1899. The inauguration ceremony of the Düsseldorf Bismarck Monument took place on 10 May 1899.

Back in Düsseldorf, Bauer took over the sculpture class at the Kunstgewerbeschule on a provisional basis from the winter semester of 1902/1903 until the summer semester of 1903, rented a studio at Goethestrasse 63 and soon moved into his house at Grafenberger Allee 32/34, where around 1904 the painters Hugo Zieger and Richard Vogts had their painting studios.

When the Girardet Bridge over the Stadtgraben at the Königsallee became dilapidated at the beginning of the 20th century, it was renewed in 1905/1906. Bauer took over the artistic design on the stone bridge construction with different gargoyles. In a mask, Bauer, described as humorous and fun-loving, is also said to have created an eternal souvenir of himself with a moustache. The pylons of the bridge represent "fire", "water", "earth" and "air".

Around 1906, Bauer was commissioned to model all the façade ornaments, including the figures of the main gable, at the Düsseldorf Higher Regional Court, Cecilienallee 4.

Until 1935 Bauer was the owner of the house at Grafenberger Allee 32/34, in which he rented two studios to sculptors and rooms to painters, including Josef Körschgen and Gregor von Bochmann. Around 1936, Richard Vogt, director of the "Eos & Excelsior Deutsche Volks- und Lebensversicherungs-AG", Eigentümer des Hauses; Bauer hatte noch für ein Jahr sein Atelier im Hinterhaus. From 1935, Bauer lived in the family home, built by his younger brother Richard Bauer, at Wehrhahn 97, which was located between Worringer Straße and the railway overpass.

Bauer was a member of the Malkasten and today's Verein zur Förderung der Bildhauerkunst in Nordrhein-Westfalen, and was secretary from 1904 to 1912.

His oeuvre includes public monuments, sculptures attached to buildings and a large number of grave monuments, but also several small sculptures, mostly made of bronze.

== Family ==
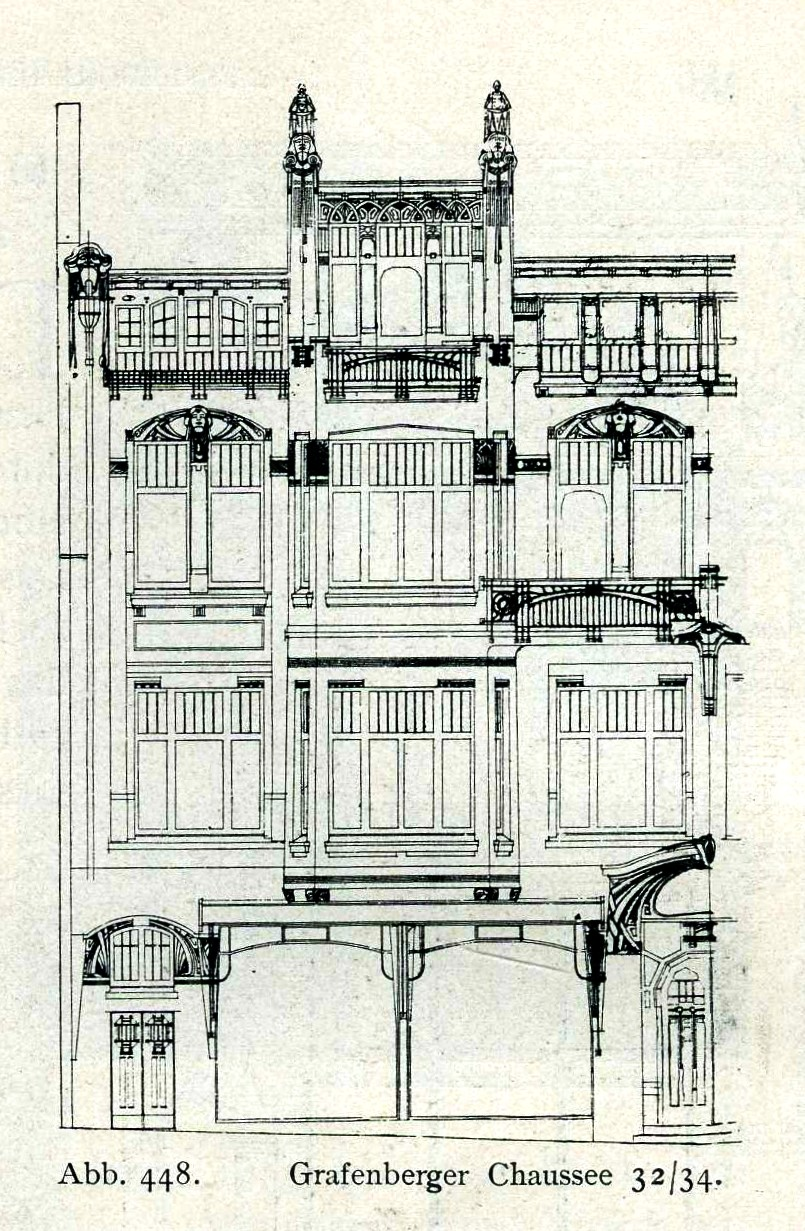
Doppelhaus Grafenberger Chaussee 32 und 34 in Düsseldorf, Architekt Richard Bauer (1875–1935)

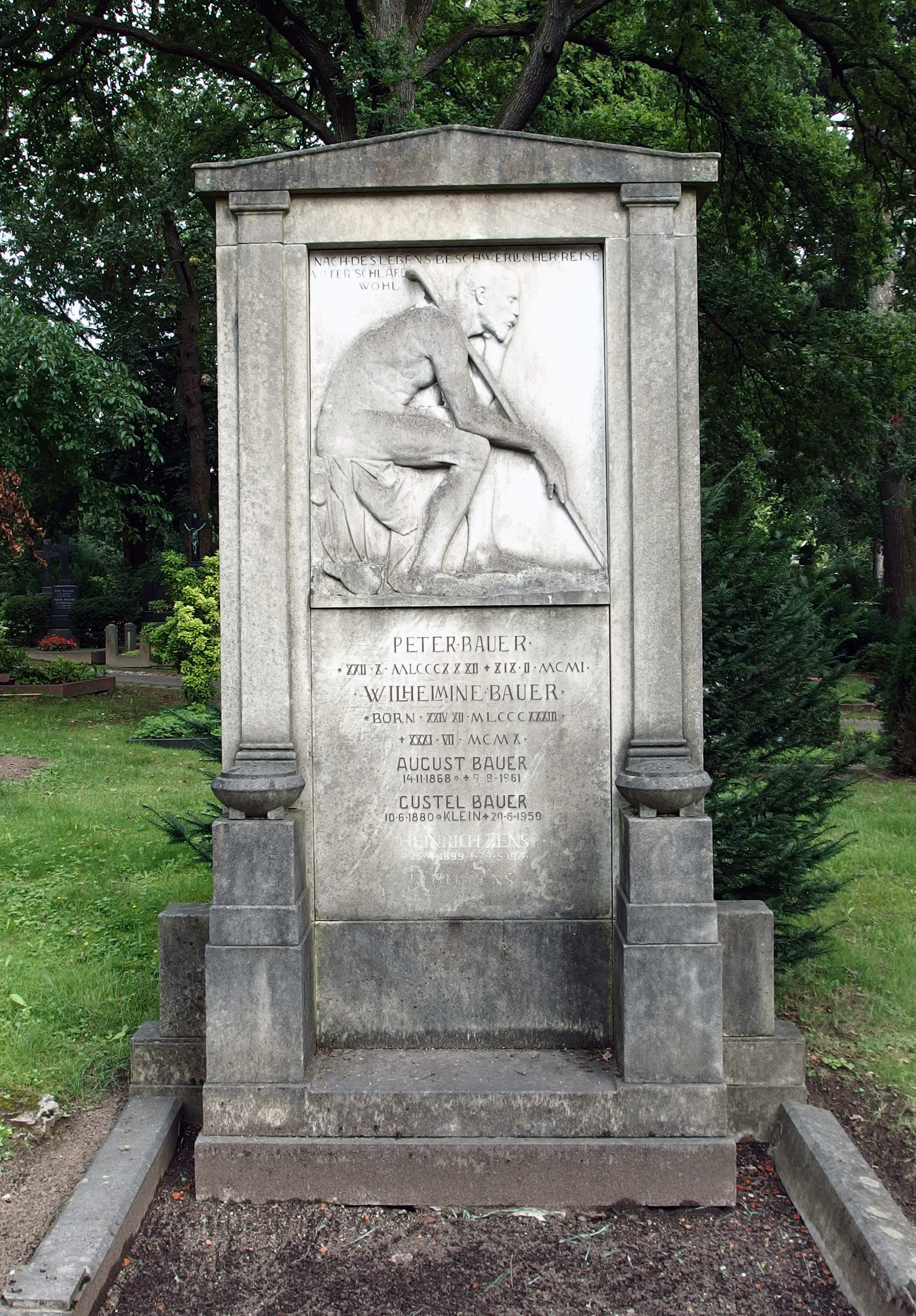
Bauer's grave site (2015)

Bauer was married to Gustel (10 June 1880 – 20 June 1959), daughter of the industrialist Peter Klein. The gravesite of the sculptor's family is located at Nordfriedhof Düsseldorf.

== Works ==
- 1897–1899: Bismarck-Denkmal, Düsseldorf
- nach 1903: Grabstätte Zigarettenfabrikant Klingspor, Marmor, Neuer Friedhof, Gießen
- vor 1910: Brunnenfigur aus Bronze im Haus Ahnfeldstraße 15, Düsseldorf (abgegangen)
- 1910: Oberlandesgericht, Giebelrelief mit preußischem Staatswappen, umgelegter Kette des Schwarzen-Adler-Ordens; flankiert von zwei weiblichen Figuren (diese abgegangen), die das Zivil- und Strafrecht darstellen.
- 1920: Kriegerdenkmal 1870/71 in Eschweiler, Gemeinschaftsarbeit mit Regierungsbaumeister Curt Gabriel, enthüllt am 4. Oktober 1910
- 1914: Grabstätte Familie Hettlage Düsseldorf, Nordfriedhof Düsseldorf
- 1925: Grabstätte Poetter mit einer sitzenden nackten Frauengestalt
- 1929: Büste Paul von Hindenburg, bronze
- 1958: Bronzerelief an der Grabstätte der Familie Rosdeck, Nordfriedhof Düsseldorf
- Statuette des Industriellen Peter Klein, Bronze
- Engelsfigur, Marmor, auf dem Erbbegräbnis Bolze (A Ost), Friedhof Wilmersdorf
