= Felix Pfeifer =

German sculptor

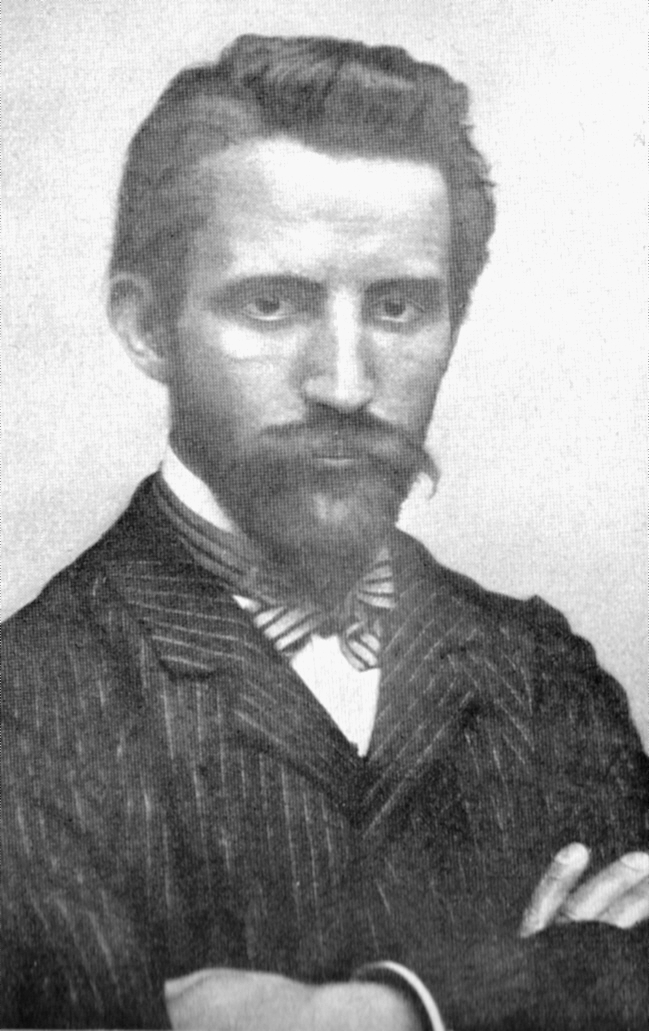
Felix Pfeifer (c.1911)

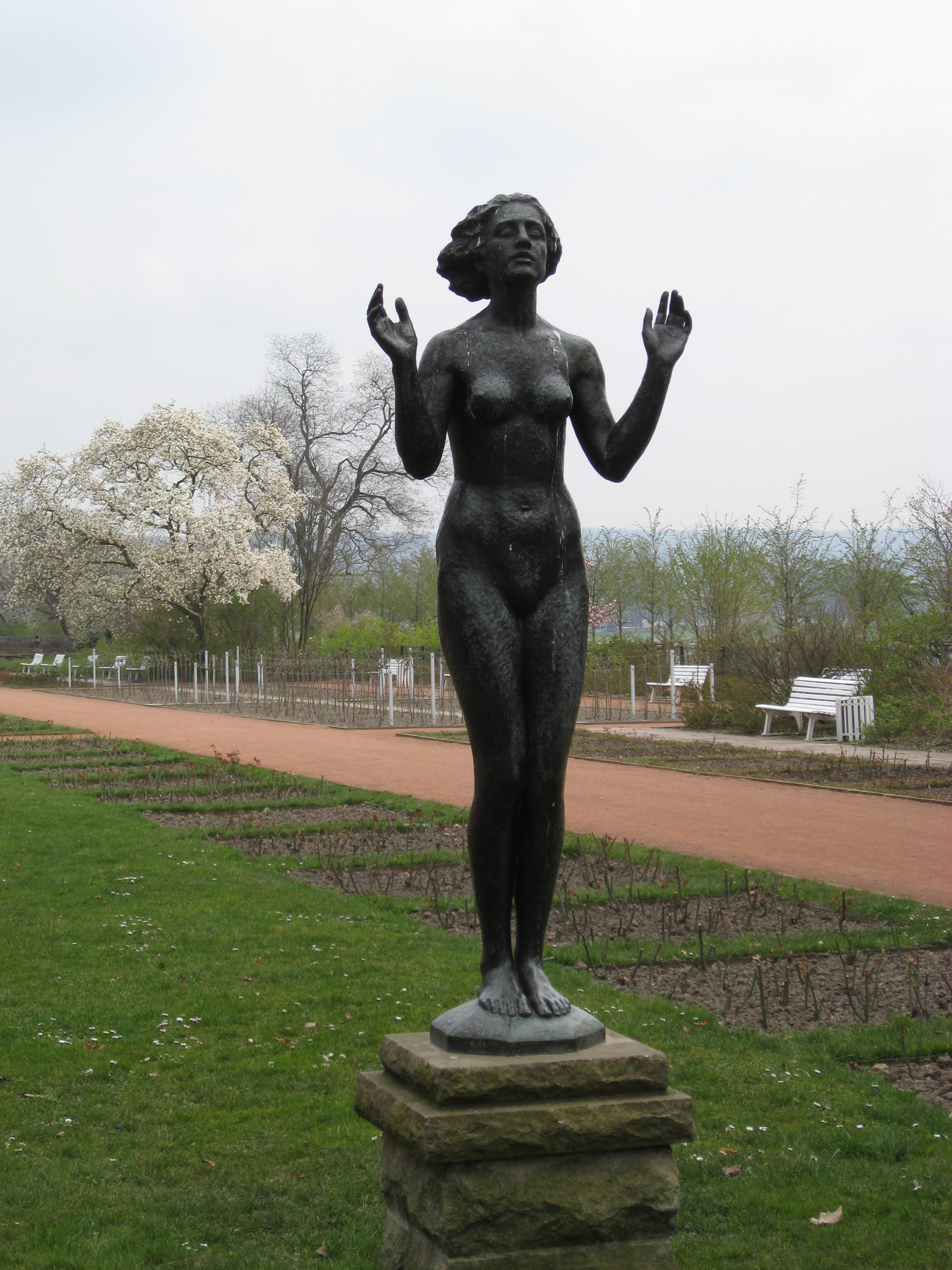
Convalescence, at the Rosengarten (Dresden)

Felix Georg Pfeifer (9 November 1871, Leipzig – 6 March 1945, Leipzig) was a German sculptor and medallist.

== Biography ==
Pfeifer was the third son of six children born to the businessman, Friedrich Eduard Pfeifer. From 1890 to 1893, he studied at the Hochschule für Grafik und Buchkunst Leipzig with Melchior zur Straßen, then transferred to the Prussian Academy of Arts in Berlin, where his instructors included Peter Breuer and Ernst Herter. This was followed by a study trip to Rome, where Pfeifer worked with Eugen Diederichs and his associates. After a stay in Paris, he was in Dresden from 1906 to 1911, becoming one of the cofounders of the Künstlervereinigung (Artists' Association). Pfeifer returned to Leipzig at the start of World War I, working as a freelance sculptor.

Inspired by the literary works of Richard Dehmel, Pfeifer‘s sculptures often dealt with the subjects of friendship and love. His first major group sculpture, Erste Liebe (First Love) was purchased by the government of Saxony, leading to a series of important commissions. These included four alabaster reliefs for the choir at St. Nicholas Church, reliefs on the portal of the New Town Hall, and three figures for the entrance of the Deutsche Bücherei.

One of Pfeifer’s most familiar figures, "Genesung" (convalescence, or recovery), was originally created for the fountain at the Allgemeine Ortskrankenkasse (a health insurance company). It was recast in 1936 for the Bundesgartenschau (horticultural show) and given the title "Beglückende Schönheit" (blissful beauty). Today, this work may be seen at the Rosengarten in Dresden, with its original title; given as a gift by Pfeifer's widow.

Pfeifer was also well known for his work as a medallist and was often referred to as "Plaketten-Pfeifer" (Plaques Pfeifer). Most of his medals and reliefs are in the Art Nouveau style, following in the steps of the French medallists, Alexandre Charpentier and Oscar Roty. In addition, Pfeifer produced designs for furniture and household items.

In 1945, after surviving several bombings, Pfeifer was killed by a clay model that fell on him in his studio.
