= Bismarck Monument (Düsseldorf) =

Bismarck monument in Düsseldorf

Coordinates: 51.224281°N 6.78154°E

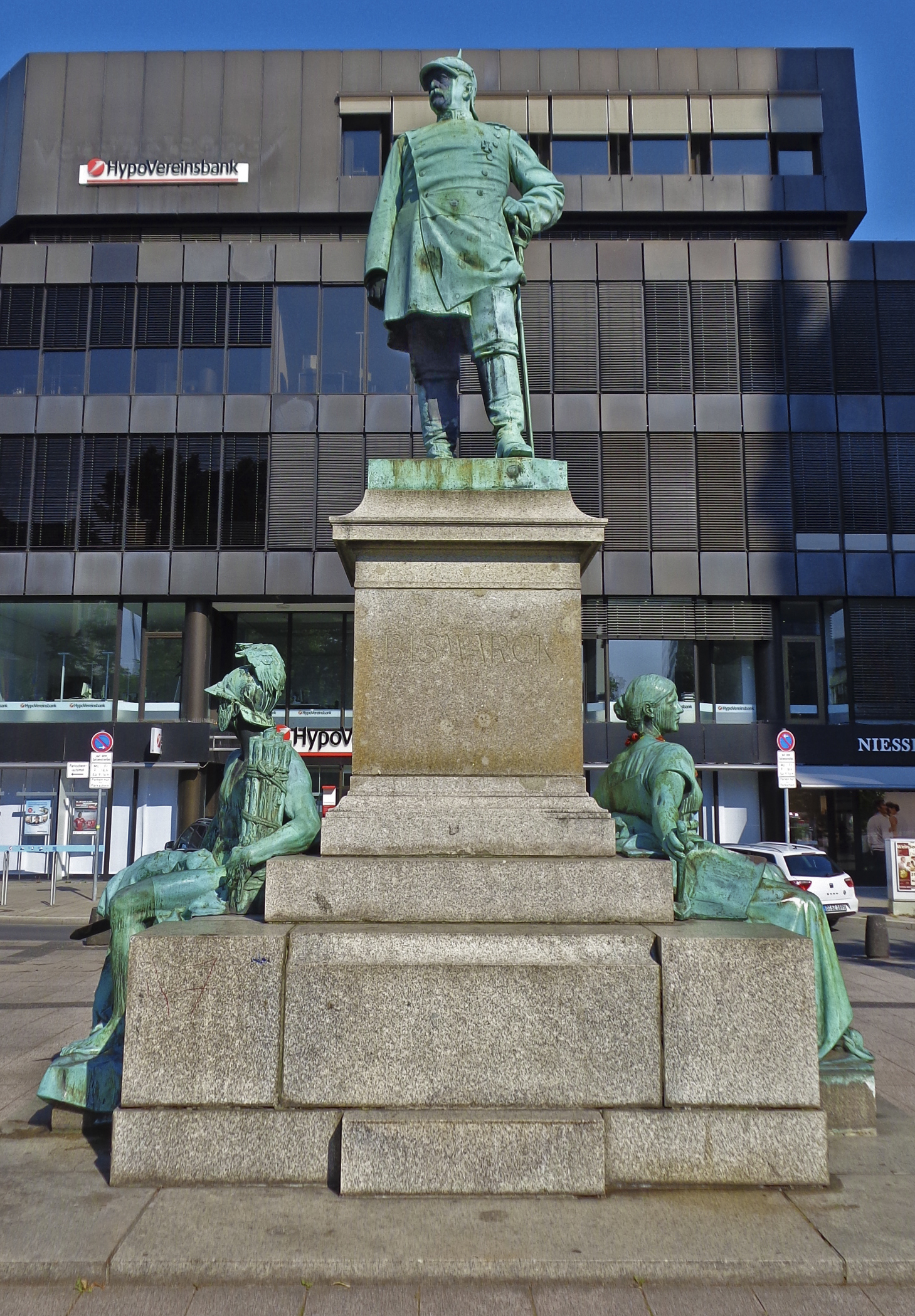
Bismarck Monument in Düsseldorf

The Bismarck Monument in Stadtmitte, Düsseldorf, is one of the numerous Bismarck monuments erected in the Kingdom of Prussia and later in the German Empire since 1868.

== History ==
The statue was created by Düsseldorf sculptors August Bauer (1868–1961) and Johannes Röttger (1864–1943) and unveiled on May 10, 1899. Originally, it was located on Alleestraße, now known as Heinrich-Heine-Allee, in front of the main facade of the Kunsthalle Düsseldorf. Today, the monument is situated at Martin-Luther-Platz, where it flanks the Kaiser Wilhelm Monument.

== Description ==
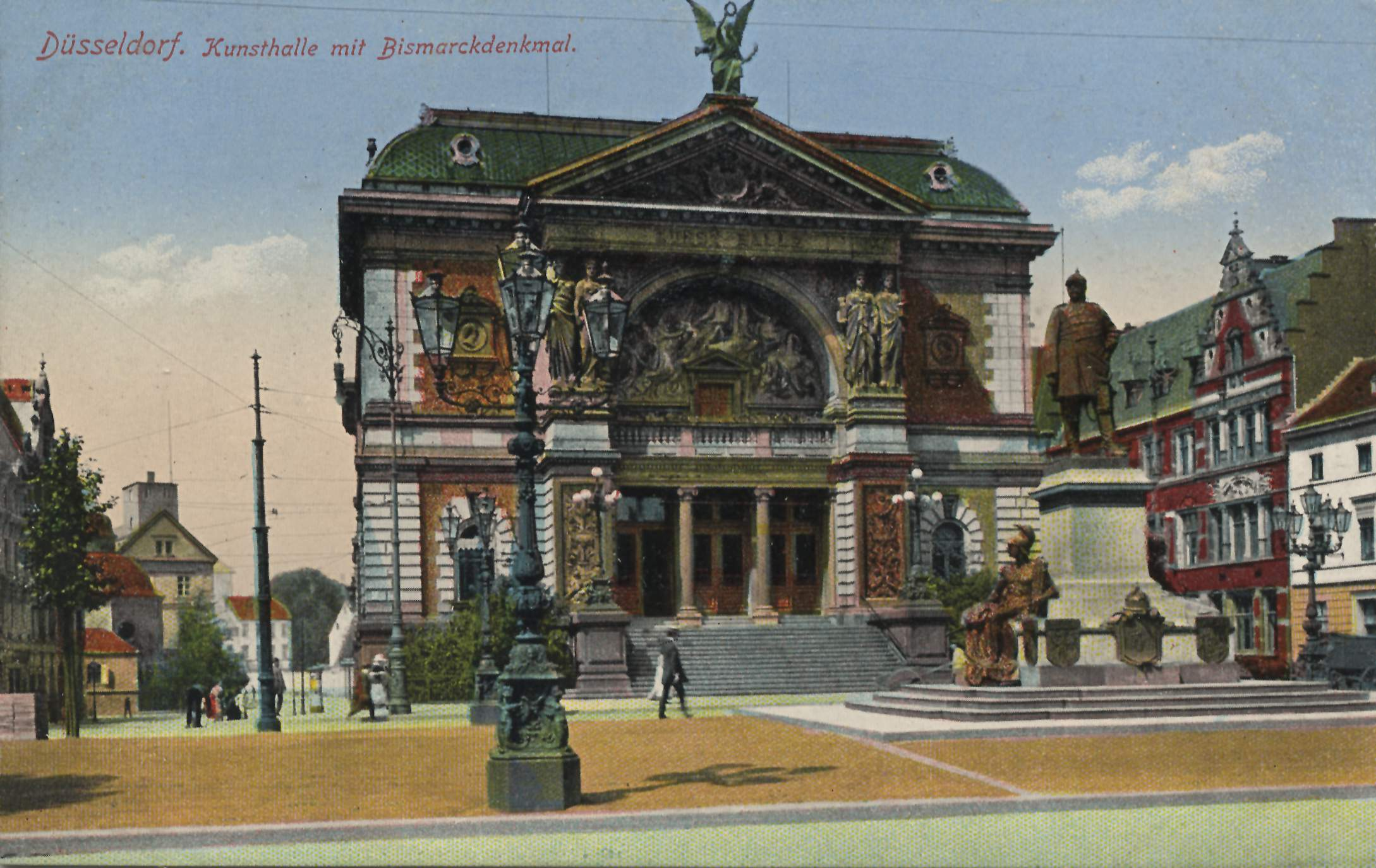
Bismarck Monument in front of the Alte Kunsthalle on Alleestraße, around 1900

The bronze statue, attributed to the Historicism and Wilhelminism styles, depicts the Prussian Minister-President and Reich Chancellor Otto von Bismarck. Bismarck is shown standing in a simple military coat, wearing a Pickelhaube, sword knot, and riding boots, with an Iron Cross on his chest. The pedestal is flanked by two allegorical figures. One figure depicts an ancient warrior with a helmet, holding a sword in his right hand and a bundle of oak rods in his left arm, symbolizing the military unification of the German "tribes". The other figure, a woman leaning on a hammer with her foot on an anchor, personifies industry, referring to the industrialization processes that occurred particularly in the Rhine and Ruhr regions during Bismarck's tenure. All figures are cast in bronze. The granite pedestal originally displayed the coats of arms of the most important states of the German Empire—Bavaria, Prussia, Saxony, and Württemberg. These shields were lost during World War II.

== Literature ==
- Düsseldorf Architects and Engineers Association (éd.): Düsseldorf und seine Bauten. L. Schwann, Düsseldorf 1904, p. 71.
