= Georges Morin (sculptor) =

German sculptor (1874–1950)

Georges Morin (30 April 1874 – 5 February 1950) was a prominent German artist, sculptor, and medalist active in Berlin. Classically trained at the Berliner Kunstakademie, he produced a wide range of works spanning monumental architectural sculpture, public fountains, and commemorative medals for major state institutions.

== Biography ==
Morin studied at the Berliner Kunstakademie from 1892 to 1896 under professor Otto Brausewetter, and sculptors Gerhard Janensch, and Peter Breuer, while drawing notable stylistic influence from Paris. Morin gained early prominence at age twenty-four with his 1898 group Die Sünde ("The Sin"). He participated in many sculptural and medallic competitions through the early 20th century.

He resided in Berlin, moving into an apartment at Wilhelmstrasse (now Görrestraße) 16 in Berlin-Friedenau.

Morin became a member of various art associations, including Reichsverband bildender Künstler Deutschlands, Verein Berliner Künstler, and der Bildhauer-Vereinigung Berlin. He frequently showed his work at public exhibitions in Berlin, including the yearly Great Berliner Kunstausstellung.

He was the subject of two paintings – one by Otto Beyer in 1898, and another by Ernst Pickardt in 1921.

== Awards ==
Morin won second prize and 800 marks for a baptismal-medal competition put on by the Kultusminister in 1899. In 1900, he received an honorable mention in the grossen Staatspreis (Great State Prize) from The Prussian Akademie der Künste. Also in 1900, he entered in a competition for a monumental fountain in Oppeln organized by the Prussian Kultusminister. He received 500 marks and was one of ten prize-winning sculptors of seventy-two total participants. In 1910, he submitted a design for the embellishment of Barbarossa-Platz in Berlin-Schöneberg; his entry was recommended for acquisition.

== Sculptural works ==
Title	Year	Type	Material	Notes	Location
A portrait statuette	1897	Statuette	Plaster		Berliner Kunstausstellung 1897
Surgeon General von W.	1897	Bust	Plaster		Berliner Kunstausstellung 1897
Flirt	1898		Patina'd Plaster		Berliner Kunstausstellung 1898
Die Sünde ("The Sin")	1898	Group	Plaster		Berliner Kunstausstellung 1898
Bust of the architect C. L.	1899	Bust	Bronze		Berliner Kunstausstellung 1899
Schleiertänzerin (Veil Dancer)	1899	Statuette	Bronze		Berliner Kunstausstellung 1899
Monumental Fountain in Oppeln	1900	Fountain	Plaster	Competition organized by the Ministry of Culture for the monumental fountain to be erected in Oppeln. Morin won 500 marks but did not receive the commission.	Westhalle des Landes-Ausstellungsparkes
Privy Councillor Dr. von Bezold	1900	Bust	Plaster		Berliner Kunstausstellung 1900
Grossvater (Grandfather)	1900	Statuette	Plaster		Berliner Kunstausstellung 1900
Lustiger Ritt	1901		Bronze		Berliner Kunstausstellung 1901
Fehrbellin 1675	1902		Patina'd Plaster	Battle Scene	Berliner Kunstausstellung 1902
Der erste Tote	1903	Group	Plaster	Over-life-size plaster group	Berliner Kunstausstellung 1903
In Signo Pacis	1903	Monument	Plaster	Morin entered this design for a Swiss Competition for the Universal Postal Union Monument in Bern. He won 3000 francs as one of the four prize winners.	Reitschule in Bern
Hermann Baumeister	1903	Statue	Bronze	Won first place in a design competition for the statue of the master builder.	Hamburg Ziviljustizgebäude, Sievekingpl Fascade
Universal Postal Union Monument Second Version.	1904	Monument	Plaster	Morin's design for the second round of the Universal Postal Union Monument in Bern. The plaster model features multiple figures showing immense vigor holding up a globe with the Genius of Culture on top of it. René de Saint-Marceaux was ultimately chosen for the monument.	
Neues Leben	1908	Group	Plaster	For sale at the Berliner Kunstausstellung 1908.	Berliner Kunstausstellung 1908
Ballade	1908	Group	Bronze	For sale at the Berliner Kunstausstellung 1908.	Berliner Kunstausstellung 1908
Ehren-Kleinod (Badge of Honor)	1908			Won 600 marks for the work	Royal Academy of Building Arts, Berlin
Tilda	1909	Bust	Marble		Berliner Kunstausstellung 1909
Eva	1909	Statuette	Bronze	For sale at the Berliner Kunstausstellung 1909.	Berliner Kunstausstellung 1909
Bärentrott	1909	Fountain		Morin submitted this design for the decoration of Pappelplatzes. He won 2nd place for this design.	
Kleiner Junge	1910		Bronze	For sale at the Berliner Kunstausstellung 1910.	Berliner Kunstausstellung 1910
Reiter	1911	Fountain	Plaster		Berliner Kunstausstellung 1911
Recke	1911	Architectural Ornament	Plaster	Architectural design by Richard Henker, Sculpture by Morin. Entry No. 117. The submission was found to be too small for the monument and rejected unanimously.	Preisgerichtes für das Bismarck-National-Denkmal auf der Elisenhöhe, Düsseldorf (January 23–26, 1911)
Das Drama (The Drama)	1911	Statue	Stone	Location on the right of the grand staircase. A man holding a dagger, guiding a lion.	Grand Theatre, Poznań
Geschwister	1912		Plaster		Berliner Kunstausstellung 1912
Problem	1912		Bronze		Berliner Kunstausstellung 1912
Familie Adolph Guttmann	1913	Gravestone	Stone		
Friedrich-Bail	1913	Gravestone	Stone and Bronze		
Decorative Sculptural Woman	1913	Architectural Ornament	Plaster		
Decorative Sculptural Man	1913	Architectural Ornament	Plaster		
Mädchen mit Spiegel (Girl with a mirror)	1913	Fountain	Bronze		Berliner Kunstausstellung 1913
Falkner (Falconer)	1913		Bronze		Berliner Kunstausstellung 1913
Eugene Richter Monument	1914		Plaster	In the final competition for the Eugene Richter Monument, Morin was not selected.	
Der Sieger	1914		Bronze		Berliner Kunstausstellung 1914
Wellenspiel	1914	Fountain	Patina'd Plaster		Berliner Kunstausstellung 1914
Model of a Soldiers Gravestone	1915	Gravestone	Plaster		Berliner Kunstausstellung 1915
Portal Relief	1915	Relief	Stone		Ledigenheim Waldenserstraße 31, Berlin
Fountain Figure	1915	Fountain	Stone		Ledigenheim Waldenserstraße 31, Berlin
Problem	1919				Juryfreie Ausstellung ehemals feldgrauer Künstler, Berlin
War memorial in the church at Heilsbronnen	1922	War Memorial		Plans were made in 1919 for the memorial and installed in 1922.	South Courtyard, Kirche Zum Heilsbronnen, Berlin
Jonge Mutter	1924	Relief			Berliner Kunstausstellung 1924
Trophy Cup Design	1924	Honorary Cup		In a competition for an honorary cup to award in sports and games, Morins design was purchased by the Deputation für Kunst und Bildungswesen for 150 Marks.	Altes Stadhaus, Klosterstraße (1924–1925)
Dr. Roesicke Memorial	1925		Stone	Architect Otto Kohtz, sculptor Georges Morin; Gaubüttelbrunn shell limestone.	Vorhalle des Geschäftshauses des Reichs-Landbundes, Dessauer Straße
Reiterin auf Fisch	1929	Fountain	Bronze		Berliner Kunstausstellung 1929

== Medallic Works ==
Apart from his figural and public sculpture, Morin was a prolific medalist whose works were frequently minted by Otto Oertel from in Berlin.

Image	Title	Year	Material	Notes	Location
	Commemorative Medal for Die Landeskunst	1899		Morin won 800 Marks coming in second place	
	Wilhelm Herz	1905		A bust of Wilhelm Herz facing left. 88.7mm minted by Oertel	
	Ausstellung Düsseldorf 1904 Plaquette	1904	Gilt-bronze	Paul Schmidt, reviewing the work, notes Morins Parisian influence. 81x51mm	Louisiana Purchase Exposition, St. Louis, USA (1904)
	German teaching exhibition at the World Exposition	1904	Silver-plate bronze		Louisiana Purchase Exposition, St. Louis, USA (1904)
	Kaiserpaares Silver anniversary Commemorative coin	1906	Gold, gilt-bronze, bronze	Given to the Wilhelm II and Augusta Victoria. Minted by Oertel.	
	Handelskammer-Medaille. R.	1907	Bronze		Berliner Kunstausstellung 1907
	Taufplakette	1907	Bronze		Berliner Kunstausstellung 1907
	Lebensalter	1907	Bronze		Berliner Kunstausstellung 1907
	Herr Schmidtmann	1907	Bronze		Berliner Kunstausstellung 1907
	Herr Th.	1907	Bronze		Berliner Kunstausstellung 1907
	Herr Prof. Dessoir.	1907	Bronze		Berliner Kunstausstellung 1907
	Herr v. K.	1907	Bronze		Berliner Kunstausstellung 1907
	Herr Br.	1907	Bronze		Berliner Kunstausstellung 1907
	Doppelporträt Plakette Poser.	1907	Bronze		Berliner Kunstausstellung 1907
	Medal der Deutschen Gesellschaft für Volks-bäder	1907	Spelter, bronze, silver	Silver was awarded to Dr. Leo Vetter from Stuttgart in for the work in his book "Neuzeitlichen Badewesens" in May 1907. Front: A woman with a naked boy on the bench of a bathhouse. Back: Eight lines of text: "FÜR FÖRDERUNG DES ÖFFENTLICHEN BADEWESEN" (For the promotion of public bathing facilities). 71mm minted by Oertel	Berliner Kunstausstellung 1907
	Unterrichts-M. St. Louis	1907	Spelter		Berliner Kunstausstellung 1907
	Berlin Conference on the revision of the Bern Convention on Copyright protection of Literature & Art	1908	Bronze	Front: Athena flanked by two figures, one with a pen and the other with statuette. Minted by Oerte l	
	Ehren-Kleinod (Badge of Honor)	1908	Gold	Morin won 600 marks in a competition for the Königlichen Akademie des Bauwesens. Front: Minerva Holding a victory wreath in front of a frieze depicting the art of the architect and builder. Back: Recipients name in a shield. It was struck in gold in 1909.	Oberen Vestibül des Kunstgewerbemuseums in Berlin (April 1908)
	East German Exhibition	1911	Bronze		East German exhibition, Posen, (1911)
	Tänzerin	b.1912			
	Plakette Leda mit dem Schwan	b.1912		Leda with the Swan Plaque	
	Urheberrechts-Medaille	b.1912		Both the front (showing three classical figures) and the back (featuring Latin text starting with "GVILELMVS II J R") are pictured.	
	Hasenjagd	b.1912		A plaque showing a rider on horseback hunting	
	Jahrhunderttaler	1913		Morin entered his designs in a competition for the Royal Mint. He ultimately did not receive the commission.	
	Ein Rahmen-Medaillon	1914	Bronze		Berliner Kunstausstellung 1914
	General of the infantry Karl Litzmann	1915	Bronze, silver		
	Professor Adolf von Harnack	b. 1916	Bronze		
	General von Linsingen	b. 1916		Back: Victory at the river Lipa with water nymphs looking on at the battle.	
	Minister of Agriculture, Baron von Schorlemer	b. 1916		Back: The goddess of fertility.	
	General Eric von Falkenhayn	1916	Bronze	Back: Falkenhayn looking down at a map with the imperial eagle above him.	

== Gallery ==
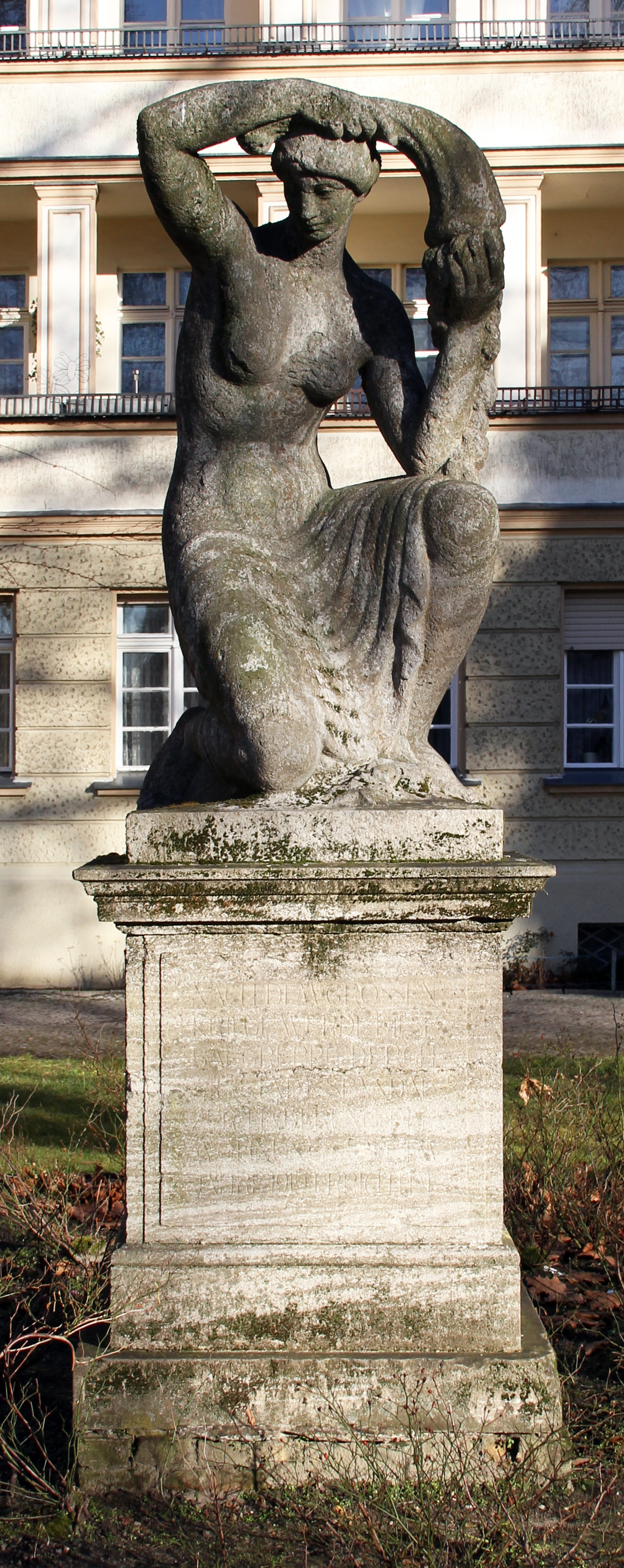
Flora sculpture in Spandau

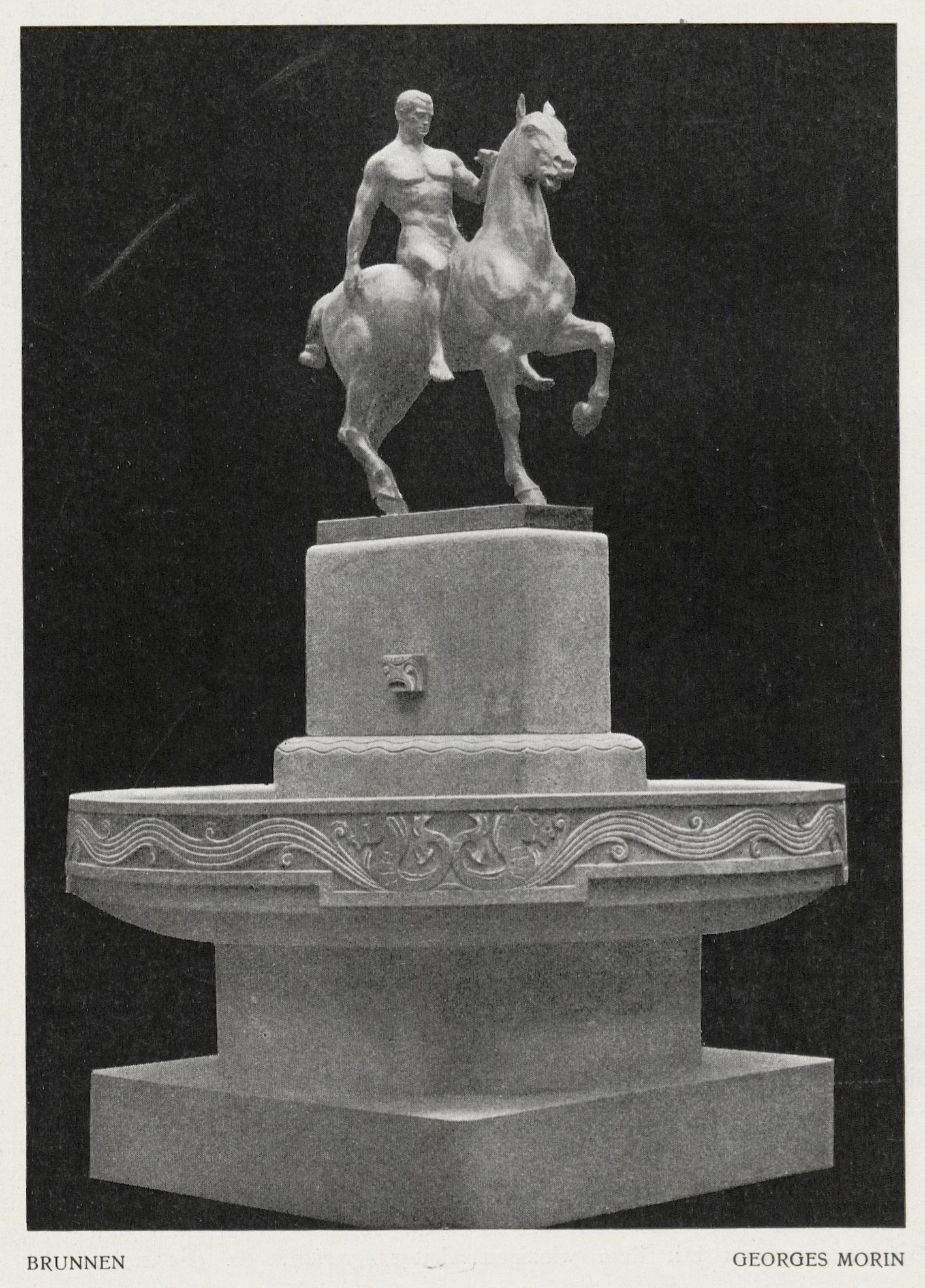
Reiter as part of a fountain
