= Heinrich Schüchtermann =

German entrepreneur and watchmaker

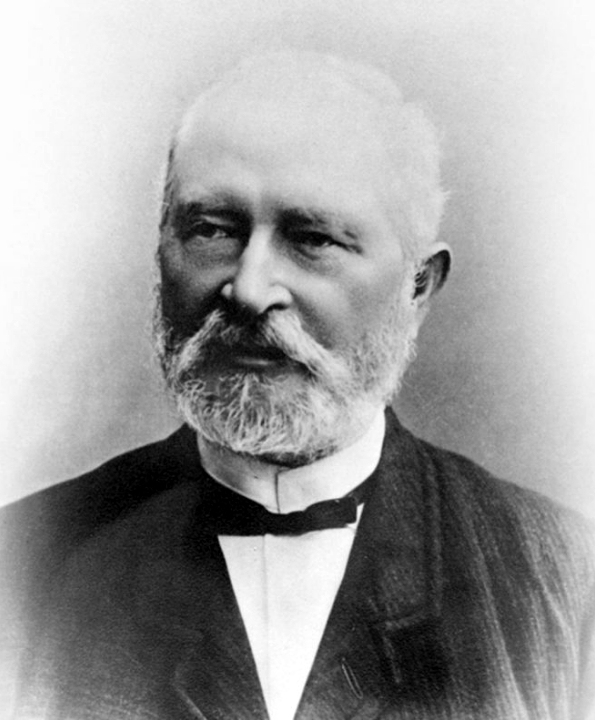
- Born: 20 October 1830; Recklinghausen, Germany
- Died: 20 April 1895 (aged 64); Dortmund, Germany
- Occupations: Entrepreneur, Philanthropist

Heinrich Schüchtermann (20 October 1830, Recklinghausen – 20 April 1895, Dortmund) was a German entrepreneur and philanthropist.

== Life and work ==
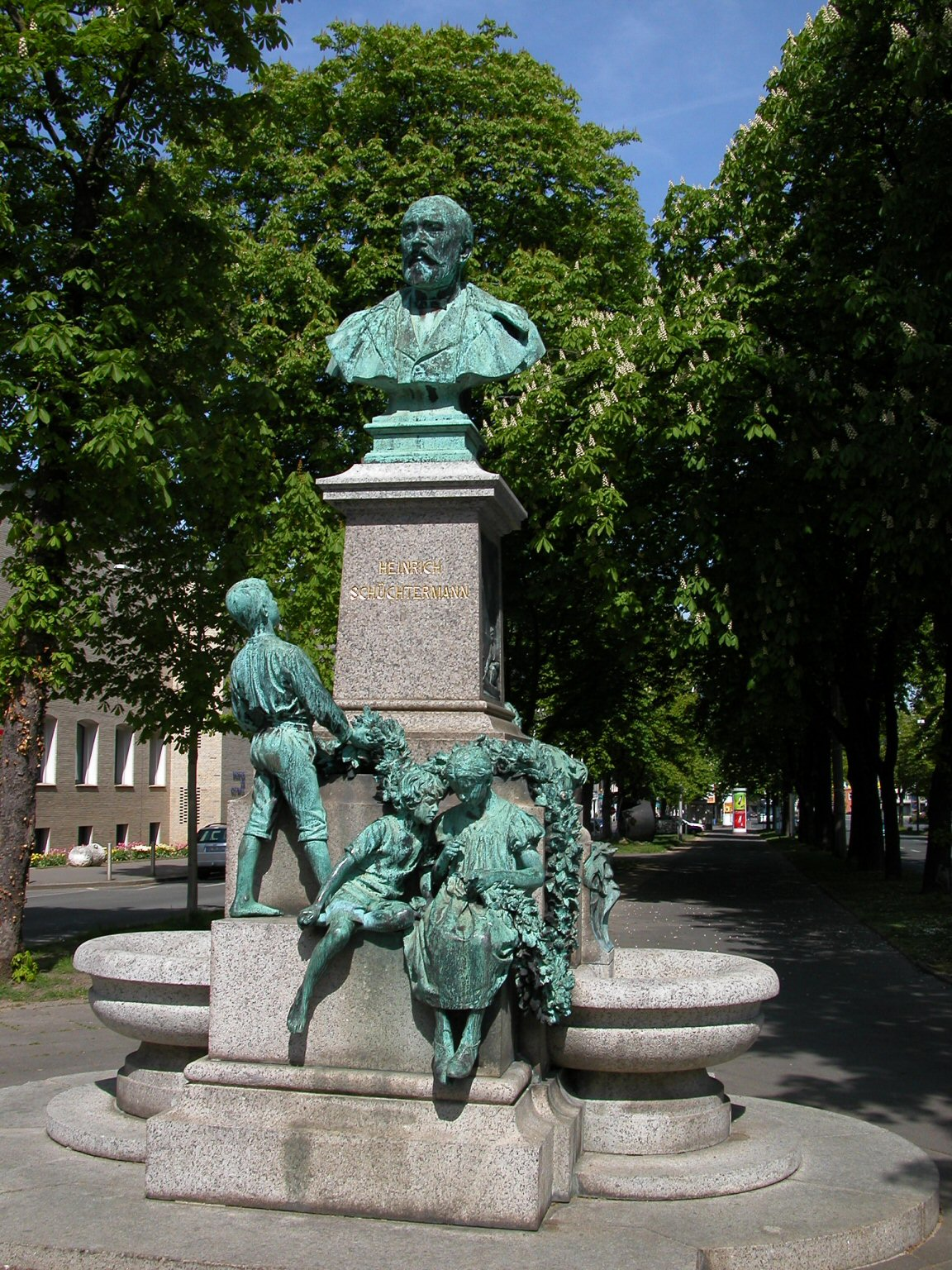
The Schüchtermann Monument in Dortmund; by Gerhard Janensch

He initially worked as an independent watchmaker. In 1870, together with an engineer named Carl Joseph Kremer (a distant relative), he founded a mechanical engineering company that became a major supplier for the mining industry in the Ruhr Valley. He produced a wide variety of products, including steam engines, coking machines, processing machines for briquette factories, filters, turbines, pumps and fans. In 1872, together with Friedrich Vohwinkel, a timber wholesaler, and several other partners, he acquired a failing salt producer in Bad Rothenfelde and created the "Rothenfelder Saline AG"; serving on its Board of Supervisors until his death.

In 1884, he made a significant contribution toward establishing the "St.Josefinenstift", a charitable organization, staffed with Catholic nuns, that provided shelter to unemployed servants, gave unschooled girls handicrafts and housework lessons, cared for the poor and the sick, ran a poor kitchen, and provided an asylum for disabled women. It still exists today, as part of a larger group of charitable societies. He was also involved in several committees working to connect Dortmund to the Prussian canal systems.

He was named an honorary member of the Dortmund City Council in 1890 and, in 1893, received the honorary title of "Kommerzienrat" (Commerce Councilor).

In 1899, the city of Dortmund commissioned a monument to Schüchtermann, originally designed as a fountain, near what is now the Museum am Ostwall. It was created by Gerhard Janensch, a sculptor from Berlin. After suffering serious storm damage in 2007, it was renovated and is no longer in use as a fountain. Bad Rothenfelde honored him as well, with a smaller monument, also created by Janensch.

He was married to Antoinette, née Schiller (1835–1900). They had no children so, in 1894, they created the "Schüchtermann-Schillersche Family Foundation", which inherited a huge sum after Antoinette's death and still exists today. In 1973, the Schüchtermann-Klinik, maintained by the Foundation, opened in Bad Rothenfelde.
