= Theodor Albert Sprengel =

Baltic German painter

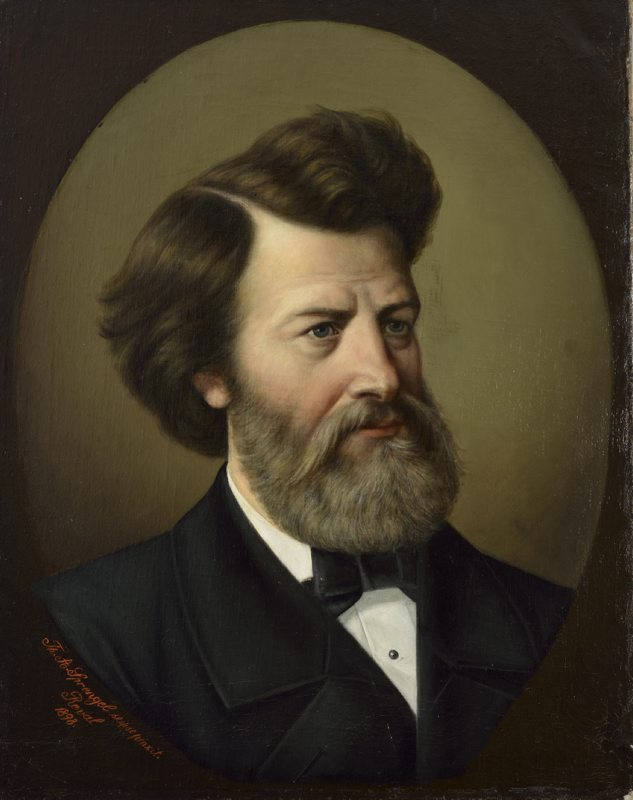
Self-portrait (1898)

Carl Christoph Wilhelm Theodor Albert Sprengel (30 September 1832, Wollershausen – 4 July 1900, Reval) was a Baltic-German painter, writer and professor, associated with the Düsseldorfer Malerschule. Although most of his works are portraits, he is also known for landscapes and historical scenes.

== Life and work ==
He was born to the pastor, Georg Wilhelm Theodor Sprengel, and his second wife, Charlotte née Gnüge. This made him half-brother to Carl August Bernhard Sprengel: founder of the Sprengel Chocolate Company. From 1844 to 1848, he attended the gymnasium in Heiligenstadt. After graduating, he attended the Dresden Academy of Fine Arts then, in 1852, transferred to the Kunstakademie Düsseldorf. There, he studied with Christian Köhler and the history painter, Theodor Hildebrandt. He completed his studies in 1854.

From 1856 to 1866, he worked as a drawing teacher at the Behmsche Lehranstalt, a German-language school in Vyborg. During this time he was awarded the title of "Free Artist" by the Imperial Academy of Fine Arts in St. Petersburg. After 1866, he was a writing and drawing teacher at the Gustav Adolf Grammar School in Reval (Tallinn). Later, he also taught at a secondary school for girls and a technical school. From 1872 to 1877, he taught at the Knights' and Cathedral School. His teaching method emphasized each individual's special talents. His best known students include Gregor von Bochmann, Karl Alexander von Winkler and Ants Laikmaa.

Throughout the 1860s and 1870s, he gave public lectures on German art. He also wrote reviews of the exhibitions at the local museums; which were some of the first to discuss Scandinavian and Finnish art. As a writer, in addition to works on art, he produced children's books, novellas, poetry and travelogues.

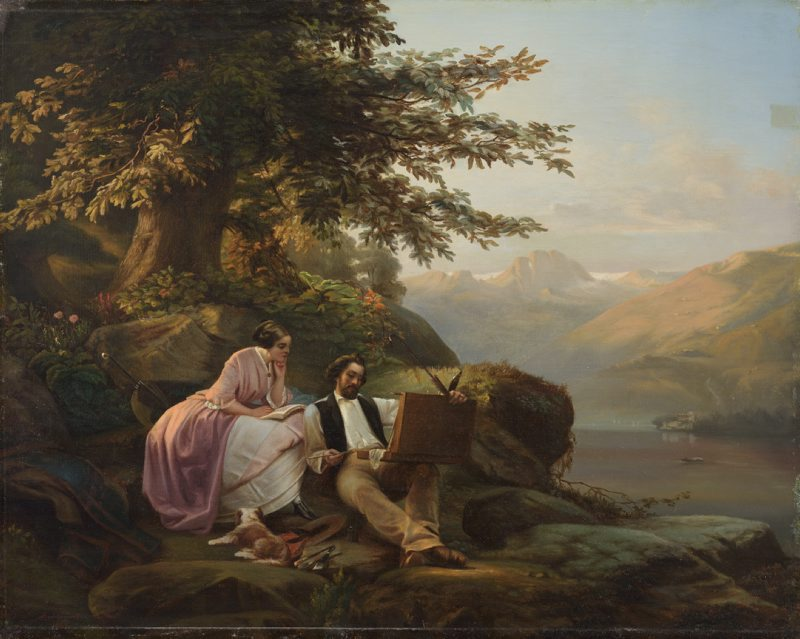
A Moment of Rest

While in Vyborg, in 1862, he married Caroline Friedrike Wilhelmine von Frisch (1842–1915), the daughter of Dr. Robert Wilhelm von Frisch (1808–1855), from Weißenstein. They had one child, Charlotte Friederike Luise (1867–1954), who married the chemist Michael Wittlich.
