= Hans Dammann =

German sculptor

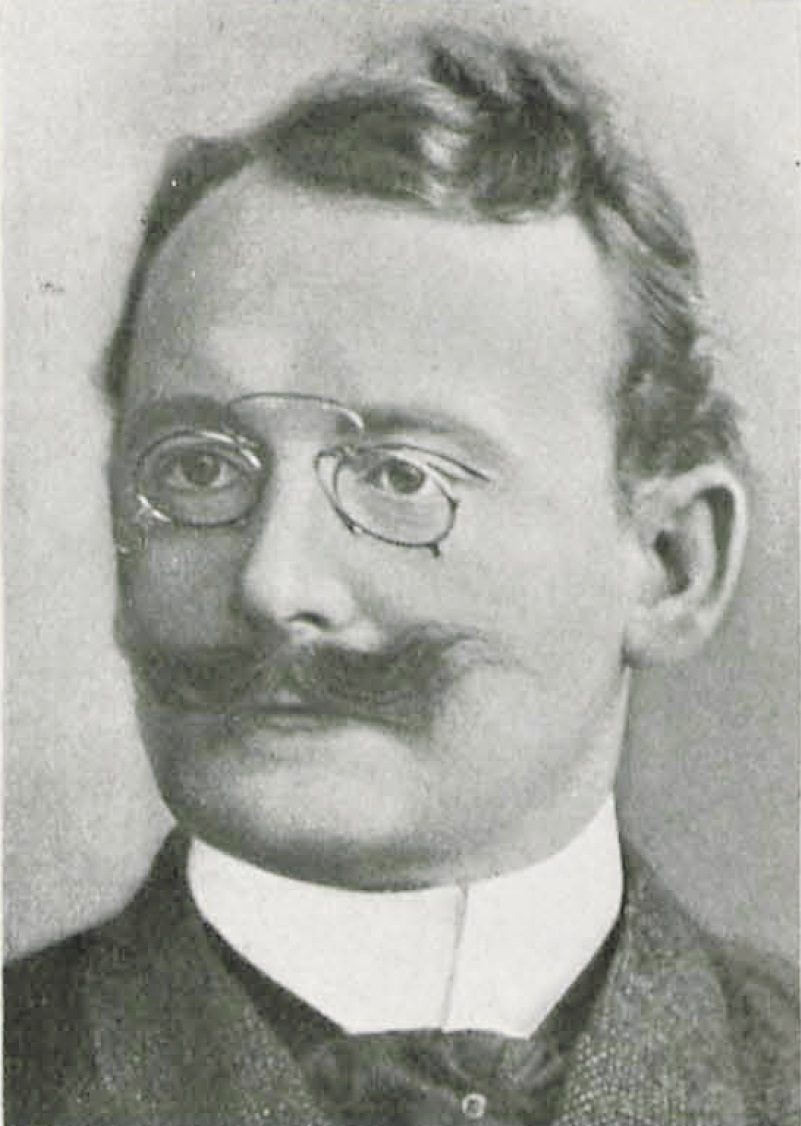
Hans Dammann (1904)

Hans Dammann (1867 - 1942) was a German sculptor; known primarily for his war memorials.

== Life and work ==
Dammann was born 16 June 1867 at Proskau in the Kingdom of Prussia.

His father, Karl Dammann, was a Professor of veterinary medicine. In 1877, his family relocated to Hanover. From 1885 to 1888, he attended the Technical University there. After 1888, he continued his training at the Berlin University of the Arts. His primary instructors were Albert Wolff, Ernst Herter, Peter Breuer and Gerhard Janensch. After completing his studies, in 1895, he went to Rome.

Shortly after, he sent some works to the Große Berliner Kunstausstellung. He would participate in their exhibitions regularly until 1913. Upon returning to Berlin, he worked as a freelance sculptor. Most of his commissions were small. His first large scale work was a fountain with a statue of a night watchman at the Lindener Marktplatz (1896). That same year, he married Frida Martha Hirschwald (1878–1952).

More large commissions failed to materialize, so he joined a workshop for cemetery art in Plauen. Over the coming years, he created more than 130 funerary monuments, including full-scale tombs at the Kaiser Wilhelm Memorial Cemetery in Charlottenburg and at the Friedhof Wilmersdorf.

He continued to do a few non-cemetery works, including another fountain in Bad Salzuflen, for the Hoffmannstift, a hospital operated by Hoffmann's Starch Factories (for which he waived his fee), and a figure of a blacksmith for the second parapet of the town hall in Bielefeld. In 1906, he created the "Morning" and "Evening" figures for the large clock at the New Town Hall in Hanover. A group of figures for the fountain at the "Kaiserjubiläumspark" in Bad Homburg vor der Höhe earned him the title of Professor, from Kaiser Wilhelm II, in 1914.

As a reserve officer, he was drafted not long after the start of World War I. In only a few weeks, he returned home wounded. This prompted him to undertake the creation of what are now his best known works; a series of war memorials for soldier's graves. As with his civil designs, many were used over with slight modifications. After the war, many of his models were reused by the Weimar Republic as war memorials. His last civil work was the Elisabethenbrunnen, in the spa park at Bad Homburg, unveiled in 1918.

From 1922, he created war memorials, exclusively. Over seventy are still in existence. As his health began to decline, assistants were responsible for most of the work. From 1933, all of his memorials were created in collaboration with Heinrich Rochlitz (b.1882), about whom little is known.

He died on 15 June 1942 in Berlin.

== Selected works ==
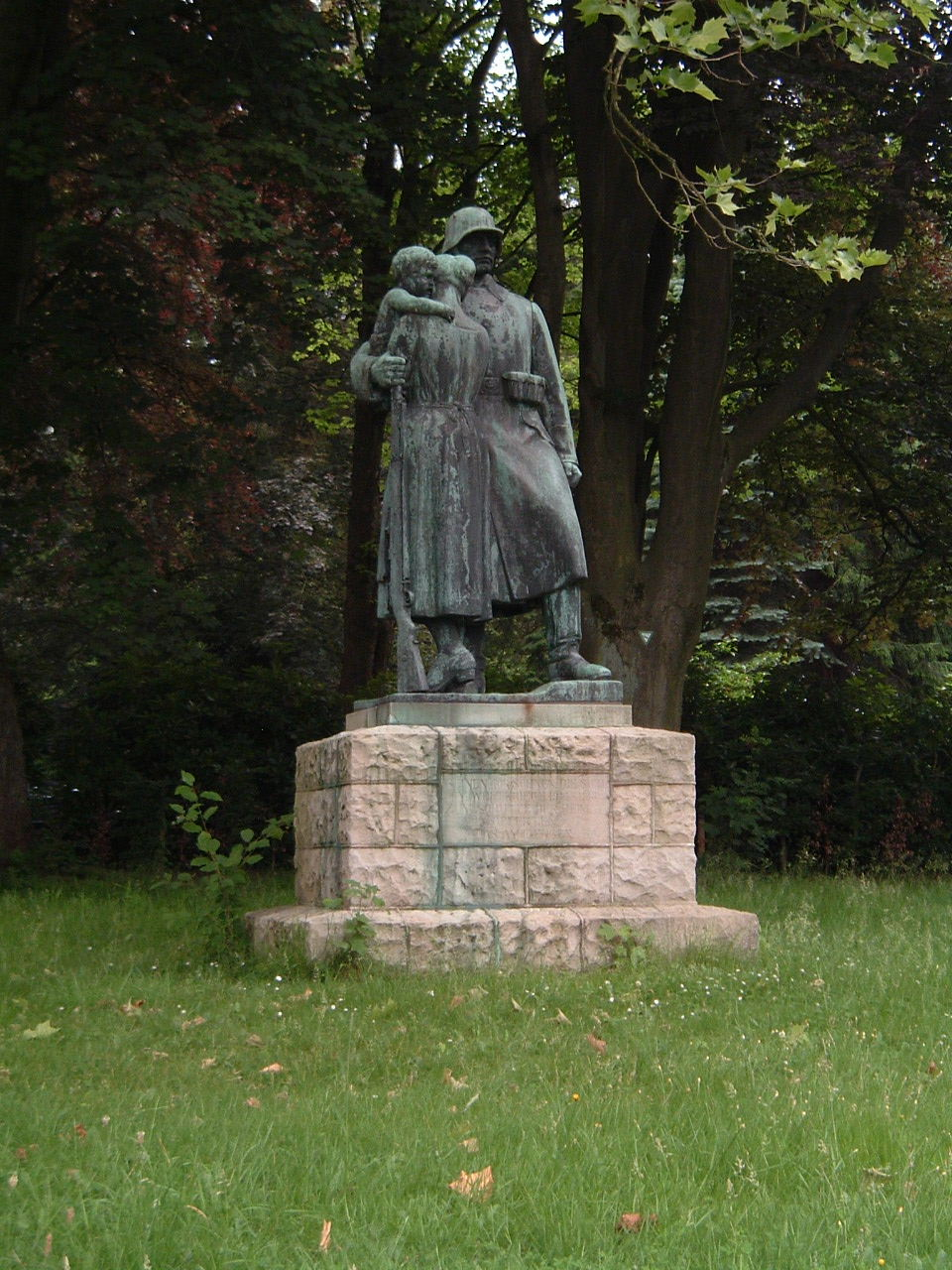
War memorial in Enger

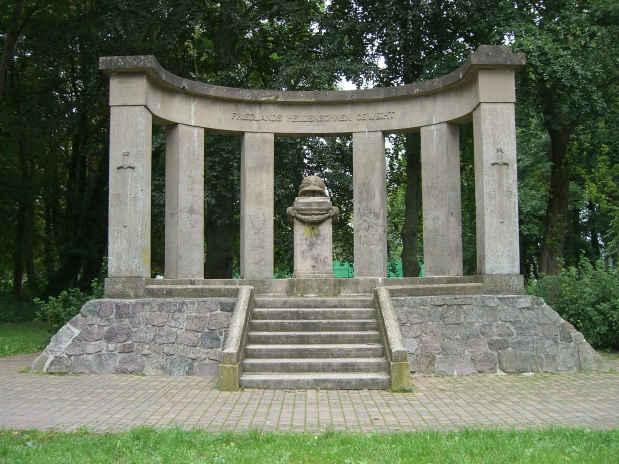
War memorial in Friedland

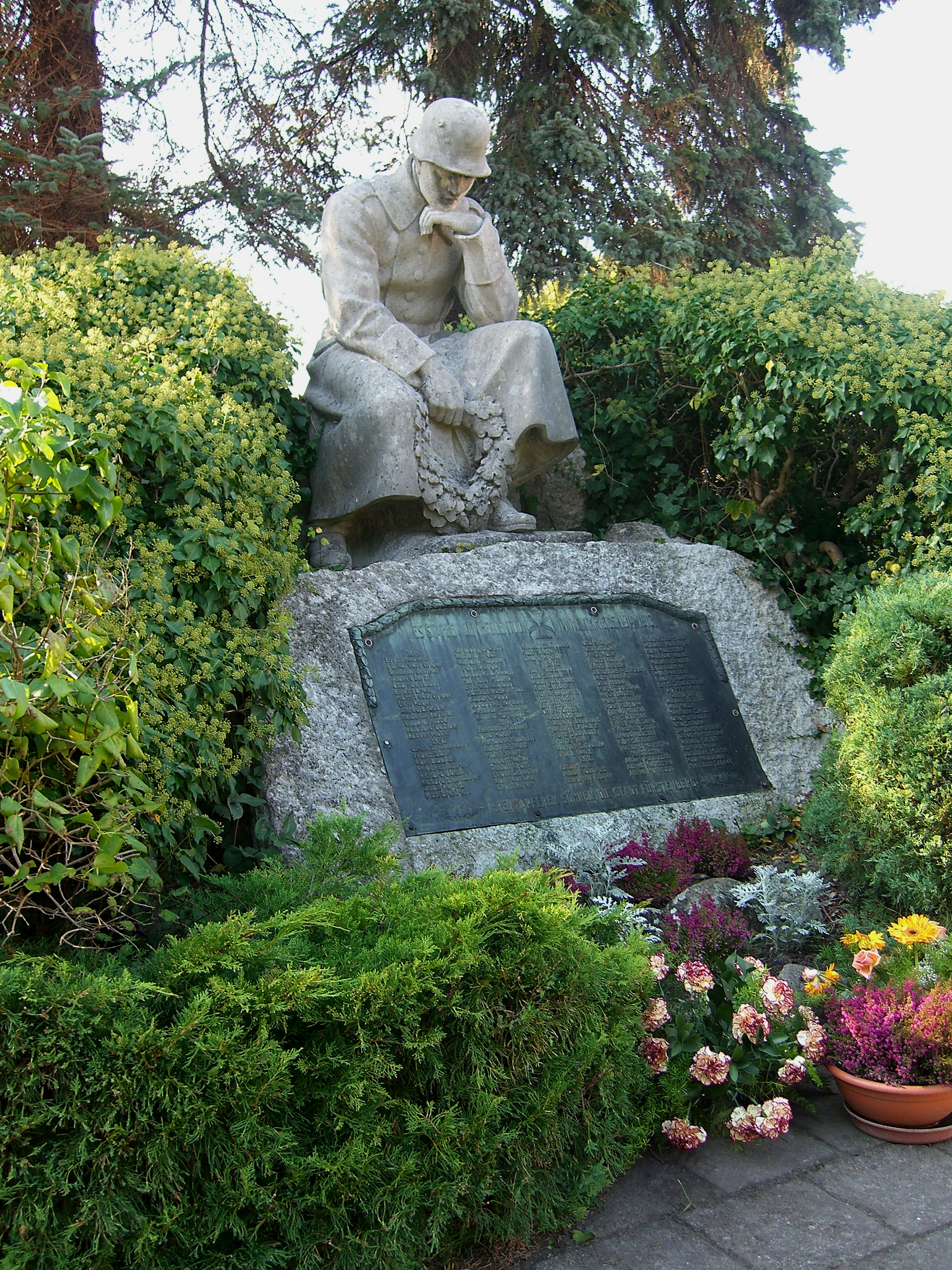
War memorial in Fürstenberg

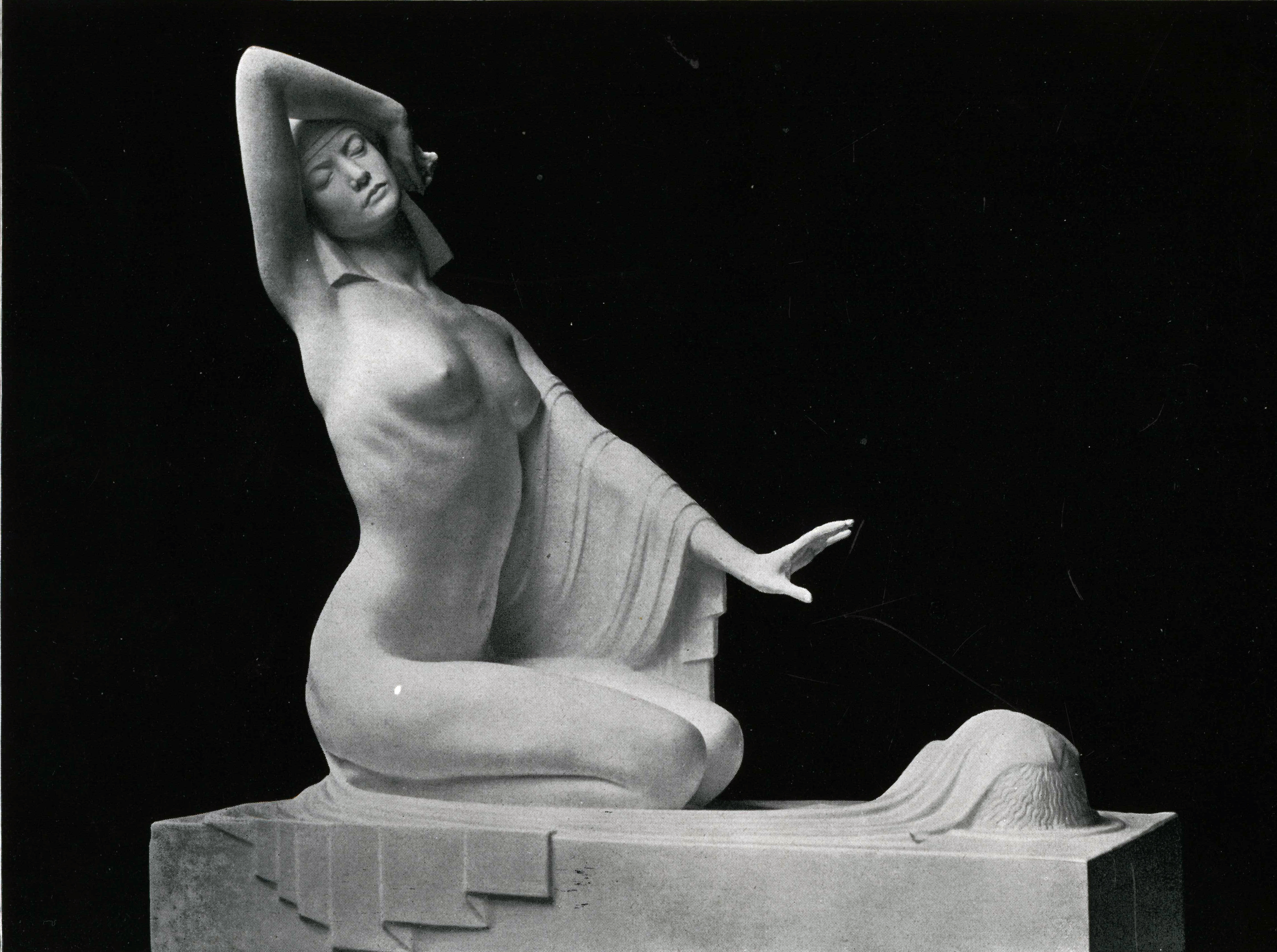
Salome

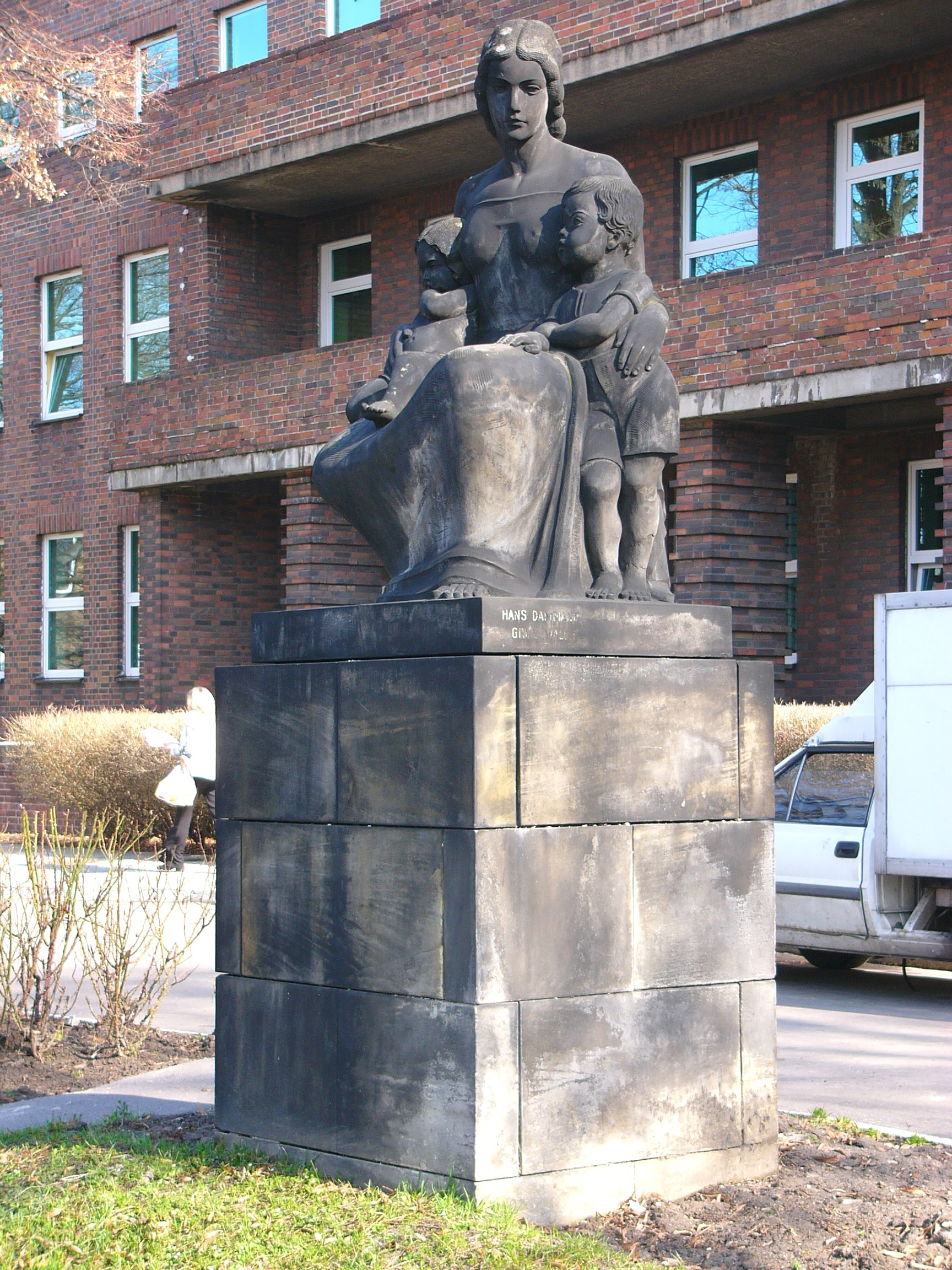
Mothers' Monument in Gleiwitz
