= Gregor von Bochmann the Younger =

German sculptor

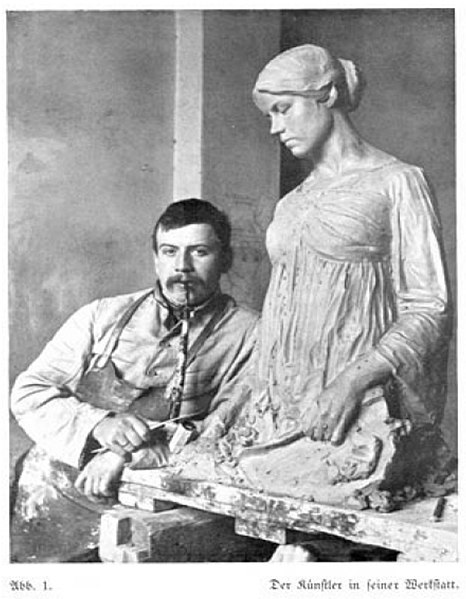
Gregor von Bochmann in his workshop

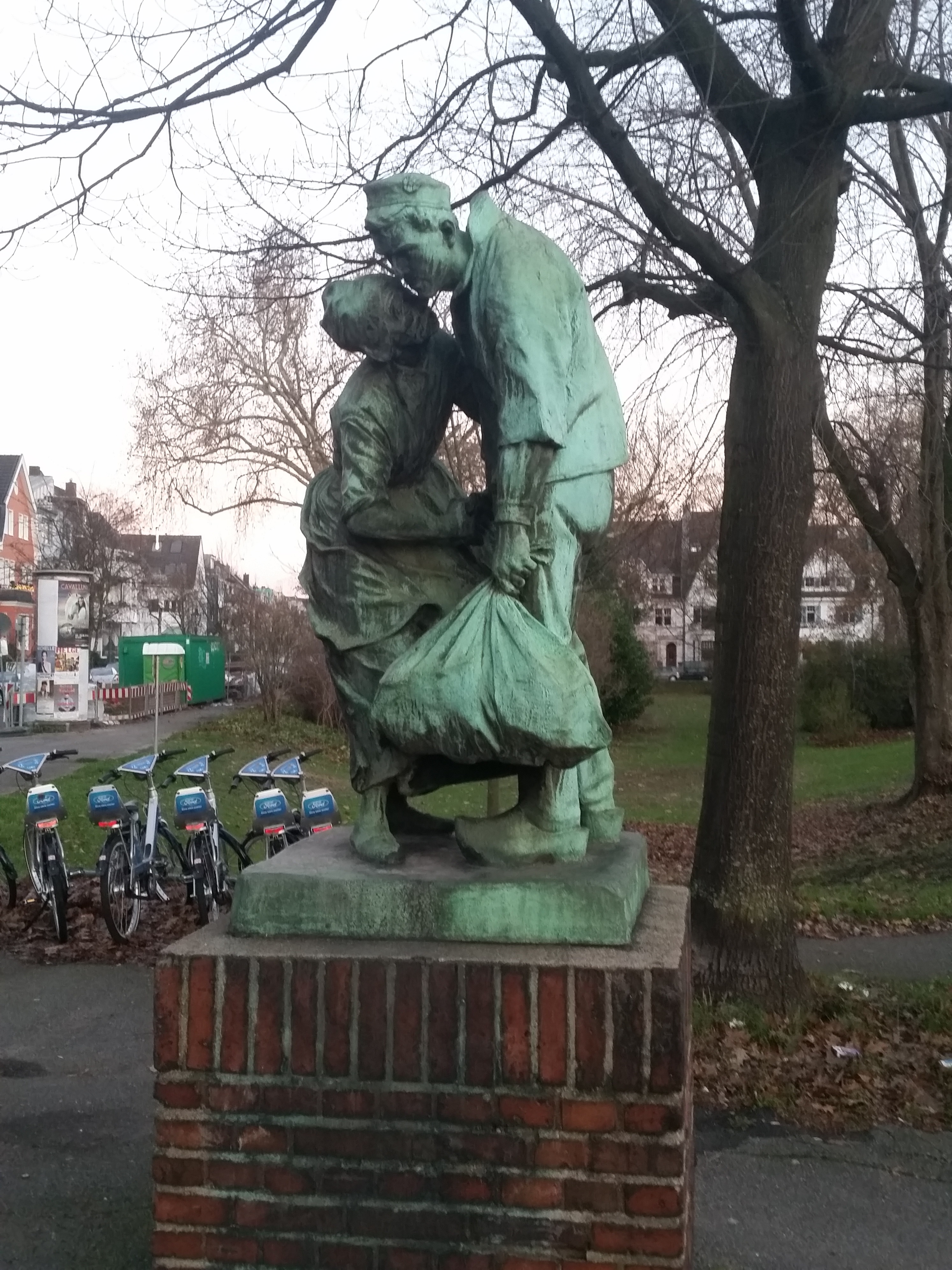
(A Sailor's) Farewell

Gregor von Bochmann (23 September 1878, Düsseldorf – 20 September 1914, near Laon) was a German sculptor. He is usually referred to as The Younger to distinguish him from his father.

== Life and work ==
He was born to the painter, Gregor von Bochmann, and his wife Emilie, daughter of the industrialist, Julius Poensgen. He studied at the Kunstakademie Düsseldorf with the sculptor, Karl Janssen. In 1905, he married Marianne Feddersen, daughter of the landscape painter, Hans Peter Feddersen. Around 1907, he moved into one of the studios belonging to August Bauer, on the Grafenberger Allee. He eventually established his own studio on the Kurfürstenstraße.

At the beginning of World War I, he became a volunteer officer in the 3rd Westphalian Landwehr regiment of the VII Army Corps. In September 1914, he was killed during the First Battle of the Aisne. Marianne also died before the end of the war, and their two children were raised by his parents.

His themes were originally inspired by his father's works, but he cane to prefer an approach based on the Frisian themes of his father-in-law. In 1904 his sculpture "Farewell", was awarded the large gold state medal in Vienna. He also exhibited in Dresden, Cologne and Munich. His familiar Neckereibrunnen (Teasing Fountain) at the Görres-Gymnasium was created in 1909. Both figures were originally naked, but the older boy was later clothed, due to complaints that the statue was indecent. That same year saw the creation of his "Linnenbauerdenkmal" (Linen Maker Monument) in Herford.

In 1917, a memorial exhibition was held at the Alte Kunsthalle. In 1932 "Farewell" was installed in Oberkassel.
