= Peter Breuer =

German sculptor

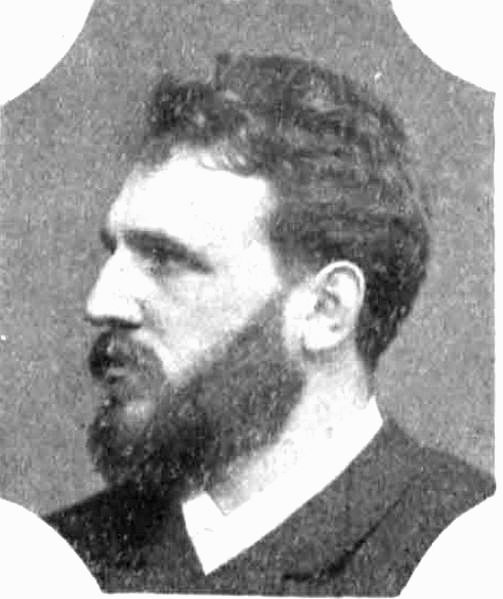
Peter Breuer (1899)

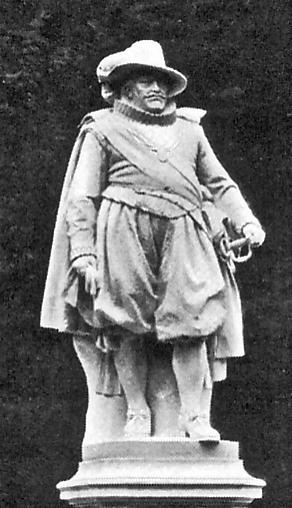
John Sigismund, from the Siegesallee (Group 23)

Peter Christian Breuer (19 May 1856, Cologne – 1 May 1930, Berlin) was a German sculptor.

He was a professor at the Prussian Academy of Arts (later, the Academy of Arts, Berlin) and was considered to be one of the pioneers of modern sculpture in Germany. Among his students were Hans Dammann, Fritz Röll, Leopold Fleischhacker, Felix Pfeifer and Rudolf Belling.

== Selected works ==
- 1894: Berlin, Marble group "Adam and Eve". Seriously damaged in World War II; restored by Rudolf Christian Baisch and Hermann Isenmann in 1954.
- 1901: Berlin, Figure Group 23 in the Siegesallee (Victory Avenue) project. The central figure was John Sigismund, Elector of Brandenburg. He was flanked by Fabian Graf von Dohna (1550-1621, diplomat/statesman) and Thomas von dem Knesebeck (1559-1625, Geheimrat and Landeshauptmann). These figures were damaged during World War II and are now on display at the Spandau Citadel.
- 1902: Bunzlau, Religious group "Let the Little Children Come to Me", commissioned by Kaiser Wilhelm II for the square in front of the orphanage; now in the Schlossplatz (Castle Plaza).
- 1903: Cologne, – Equestrian statue of Kaiser Friedrich III; melted down sometime between 1942 and 1945.
- 1907: Memel – Borussia Monument; designed to commemorate the 100th anniversary of the fall of Königsberg, when the Imperial Couple was able to hold out at the City Hall in Memel until the Peace of Tilsit was signed. The statue was toppled during the Klaipėda Revolt and restored by the Nazis in 1939. Towards the end of World War II, it was dismantled again, melted down, and replaced by a Soviet-related figure.
- 1909, Kleve – near the stables at the Schwanenburg; Equestrian statue of Friedrich Wilhelm, Elector of Brandenburg.
- 1912-14: Berlin-Steglitz – Otto Lilienthal Monument with figure of Icarus.
- 1925: Berlin, Griechischen Park, Venus und Amor.
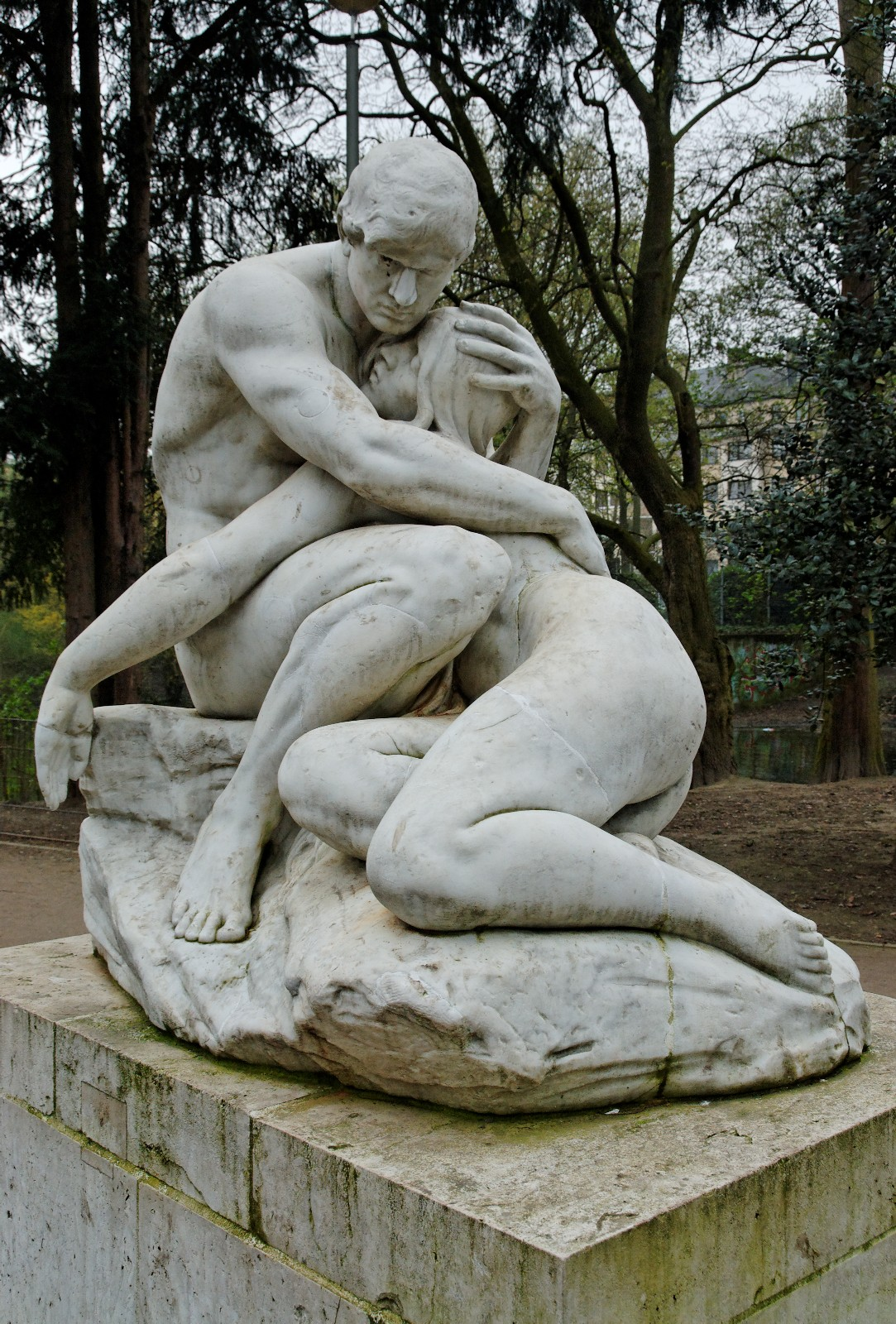
Adam and Eve

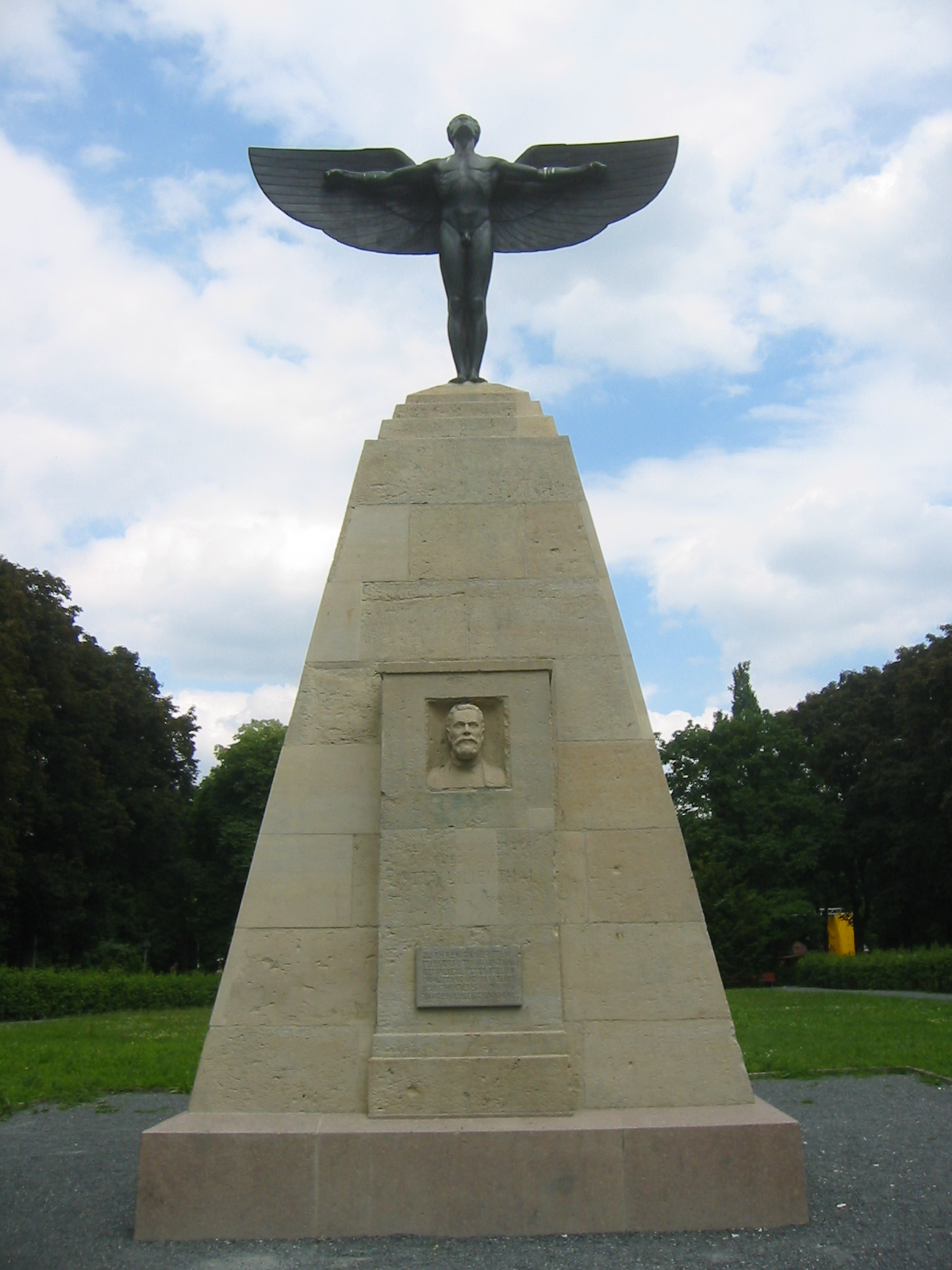
Otto Lilienthal Monument

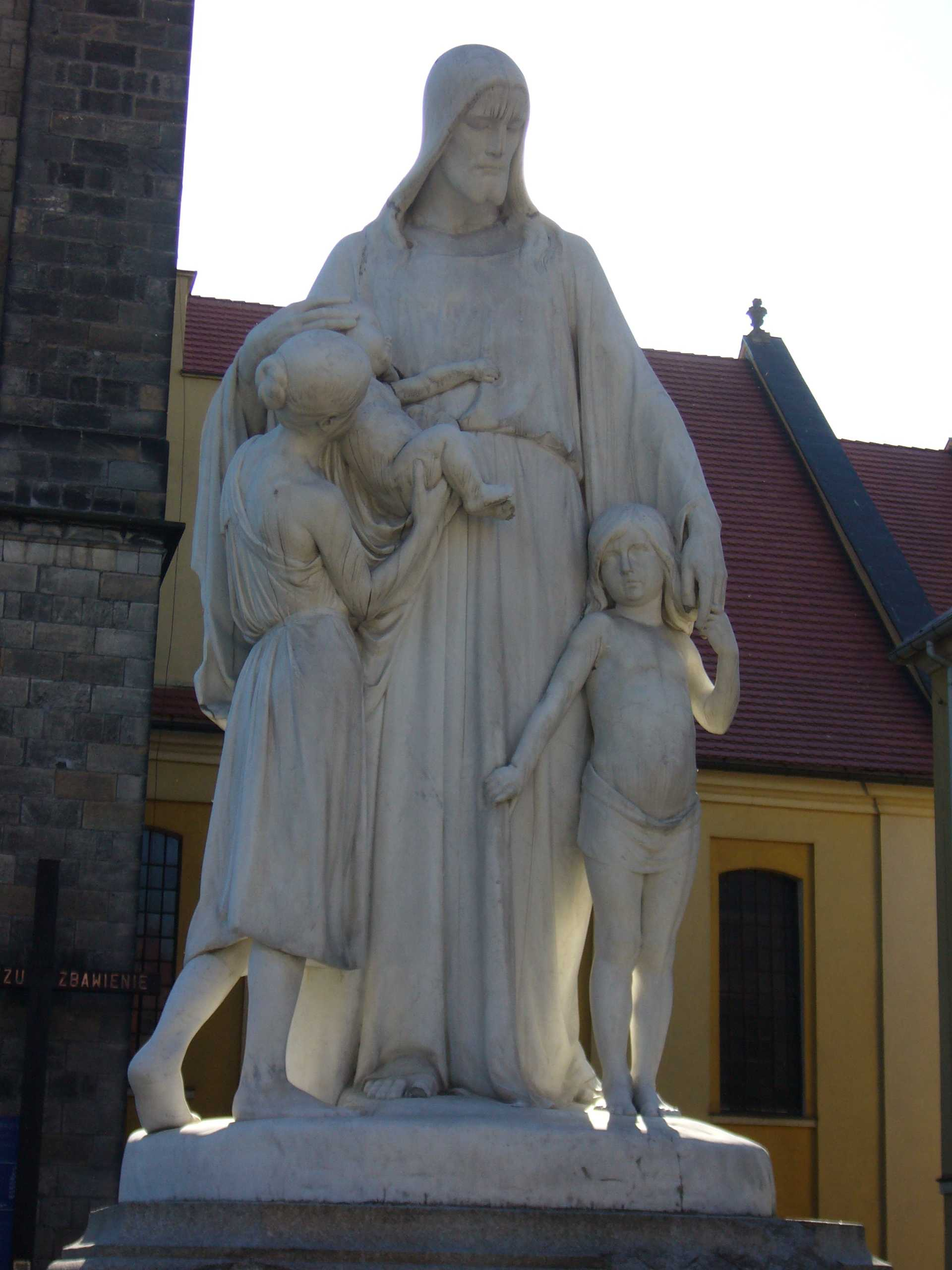
"Let the Little Children Come to Me..."

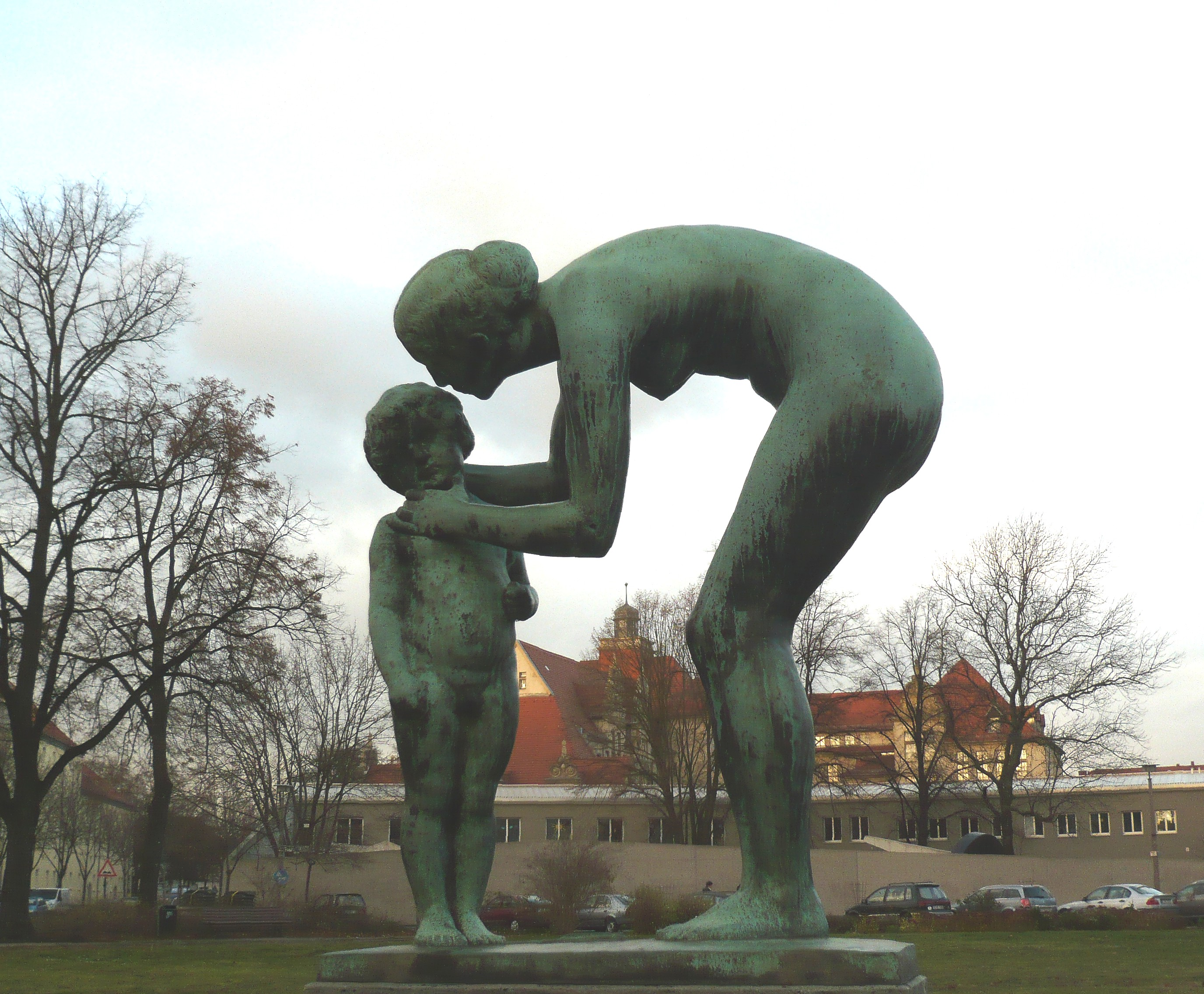
Venus and Amor

== See also ==
- Georges Morin (sculptor), student of Breuer
