= Nehatu, Pärnu County =

Village in Estonia

Coordinates: 58°34′07″N 23°39′51″E

Nehatu
- Village
- Interactive map of Nehatu
- Country: Estonia
- County: Pärnu County
- Parish: Lääneranna Parish
- Time zone: UTC+2 (EET)
  - Summer (DST): UTC+3 (EEST)

Nehatu (German: Nehhat) is a village in Lääneranna Parish, Pärnu County, in western Estonia.
