= Herman Dammann =

American politician

Herman Dammann (April 2, 1888 – March 15, 1968) was a farmer and politician.

== Biography ==
Dammann was born in Minnesota and lived in Plato, McLeod County, Minnesota. He was a farmer and cattle breeder. He served in the Minnesota House of Representatives from 1925 until 1942.
