= Robert Stock (businessman) =

German entrepreneur and telecommunications pioneer (1858-1912)

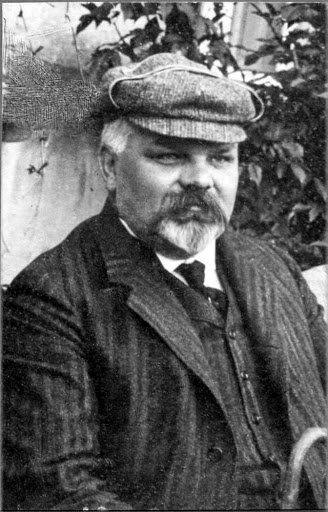
- Robert Stock
- Born: 4 April 1858; Hagenow
- Died: 13 July 1912 (aged 54); Landkreis Kolberg-Körlin
- Occupations: German entrepreneur and telecommunications pioneer

Carl Christian Robert Stock (4 April 1858, Hagenow - 13 July 1912, Landkreis Kolberg-Körlin) was a German entrepreneur and telecommunications pioneer.

== Biography ==
His father was a master locksmith, and Robert learned the trade in his workshop. When he became a journeyman, he spent three years travelling, as was customary, to expand his skills. From 1878 to 1880, he performed his military service, working as a gunsmith. He then returned to the family workshop.

In 1882, he moved to Berlin and found a job as a lathe operator at the machine tool factory owned by Ludwig Loewe. Later, he became a mechanic at the telegraph construction company operated by the Naglo brothers. He married in 1885, and changed jobs again the following year; moving to Mix & Genest, another telegraphy company. By 1887, he was producing spindles, under license from Mix & Genest, and was able to hire his own mechanic. He soon produced coils and bells under the name "Deutsche Telephonwerke R. Stock & Co.", which is still in business under the name "DeTeWe". By 1888, he had eighteen employees. In 1889, he took on a financial partner and soon had sixty-six employees. At that time, certain types of switches had to be imported from the United States. He decided to begin making them and, by 1893, had 230 employees. They were strictly disciplined, but paid very well.

He also maintained a close relationship with the Director of the Imperial Post Office, Heinrich von Stephan. Through this connection, he was able to obtain orders for new telegraph and telephone offices in Leipzig, Hanover and Stettin. In 1896, he set up a booth in a pavilion at the Great Industrial Exposition of Berlin, to introduce visitors to the potentials of telephony. Three years later, he converted DeTeWe into a "Gesellschaft mit beschränkter Haftung" (GmbH, roughly the equivalent of an LLC); becoming a member of the supervisory board. By 1900, he had left the company, retiring to his private estate, "Gut Sophienwalde" (named after his wife), in Kolberg.

He was however, not the sort of person to remain idle. It became obvious to him that the steam plows used by the local farmers were cumbersome and inefficient. So, in 1905, together with one of his former engineers, he devised a motor plow, with three plowshares. He was awarded a patent for it in 1909. By 1911 his new company, "Stock Motorpflug GmbH", was producing two plows a day. The company was in business, under various names and ownerships, until the factory was destroyed in 1943, during World War II.

He died unexpectedly, aged only fifty-four, from a heart condition. His grave features the statue of a blacksmith, created by the sculptor, Gerhard Janensch. Streets have been named after him in Hagenow, Schwerin and Ahrensfelde. A gymnasium in Hagenow was dedicated to him in 1999.

== Sources ==
- Dieter Leuthold: "Der Typus des innovativ-inventiven Unternehmers um die Jahrhundertwende: das Beispiel des Berliner Unternehmers Robert Stock", In: Hans-Heinrich Bass (Ed.): Facetten volkswirtschaftlicher Forschung. Festschrift für Karl Marten Barfuß. Lit Verlag, Münster 2004, ISBN 3-8258-7441-9, pp.39–52.
- Berlinische Monatsschrift. Edition Luisenstadt. Vol.11, November 1995, pp.30–38.
- Klaus Dreyer: Die Geschichte der Landtechnik @ Landtechnik Historisch
