= Gerhard Janensch =

German sculptor

Gerhard Adolf Janensch
- Born: April 24, 1860
- Died: February 2, 1933 (aged 72)
- Education: Prussian Academy of Arts
- Known for: Sculpture

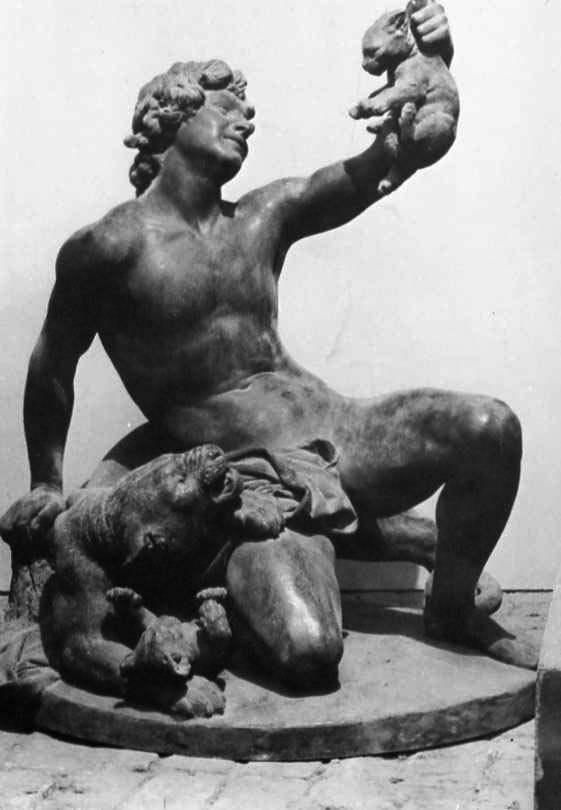
Bacchanalian with Panthers

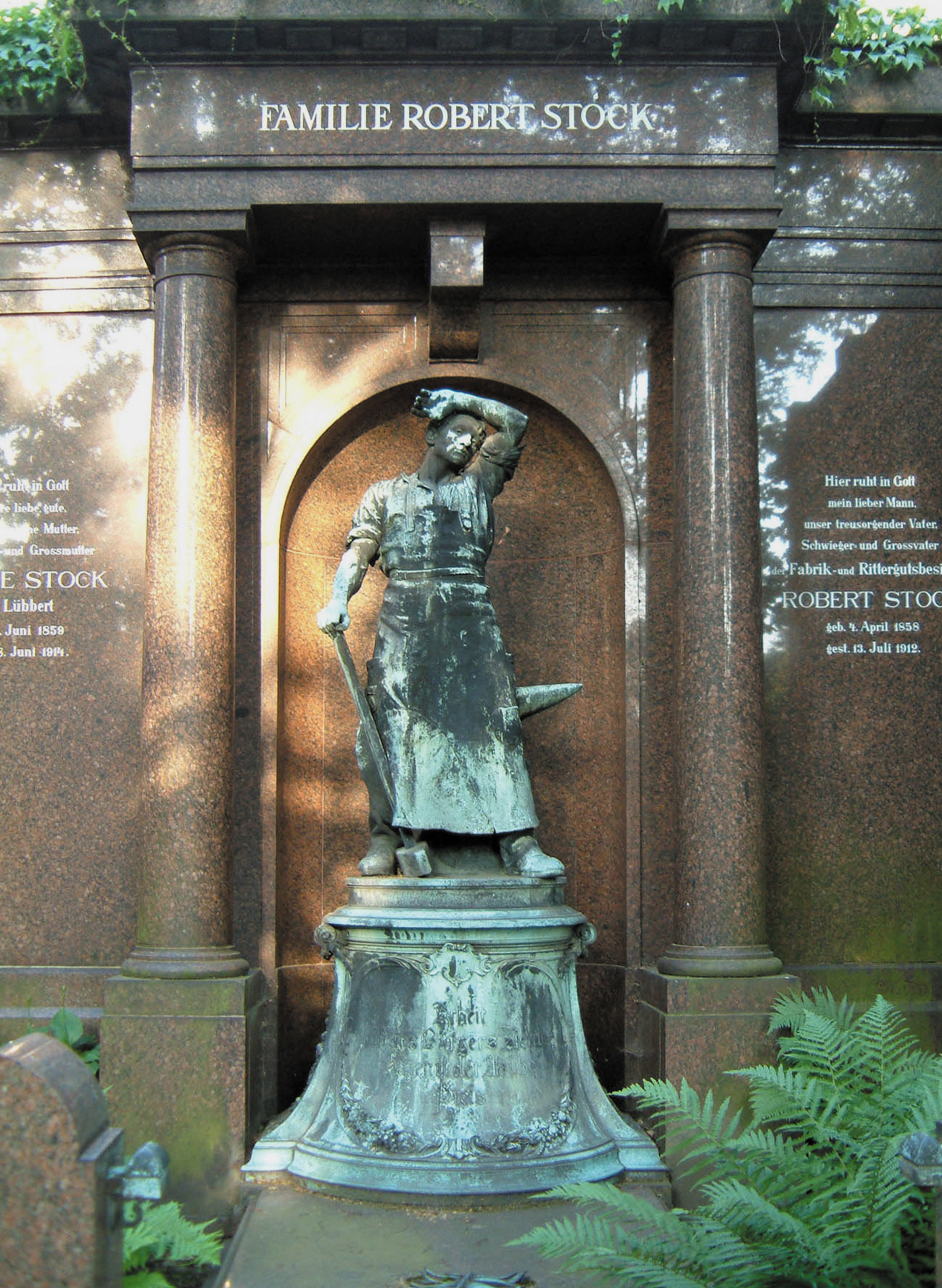
The Blacksmith on the tomb of Robert Stock

Gerhard Adolf Janensch (24 April 1860, Zamborst – 2 February 1933, Berlin) was a German sculptor and medailleur.

== Life ==
At the age of seventeen, he entered the Prussian Academy of Arts, where he studied under Fritz Schaper, Albert Wolff and Paul Thumann. In 1880, he started his own studio in Vienna, but returned to work with Schaper in 1883. The following year, he joined the German Artists' Association and received a stipendium to study in Rome for his work Bacchant mit Panthern. He finally became self-sufficient in 1886 and began teaching at the Academy, where he remained until 1924. In addition to sculpture, he taught workshops on carpentry, blacksmithing, locksmithing and pottery. In 1892, he succeeded Wolff as head of the modelling class and was named a full member of the Academy in 1897.

One of his most prominent patrons was the entrepreneur and telecommunications pioneer, Robert Stock. The figure of a blacksmith that Janensch made for display at the Great Berlin Art Exhibition in 1897 later became Stock's tomb sculpture. Other figures of industrial workers (foundrymen, glass-blowers, boilermakers etc.) were a featured display in the "Art and Technology" exhibition, held at the Museum Folkwang in 1928.

== Other selected major works ==
- The Johannes Bugenhagen Monument in Wittenberg (Bust, 1894).
- The statue of Asmus Jacob Carstens in the Altes Museum, Berlin.
- A figure of Carl Friedrich Gauss on the Potsdam Bridge in Berlin (melted during World War II)
- The Heinrich Schüchtermann Monument in Dortmund
- Der Große Kurfürst in der Jugend ("The Great Elector in Youth"), a monument for Prince (later Elector) Friedrich Wilhelm (shown with his dog), in Küstrin.

== See also ==
- Georges Morin (sculptor), student of Janensch
