= Hanila Parish =

Former municipality in Estonia

Hanila Parish Hanila vald
- Former municipality of Estonia
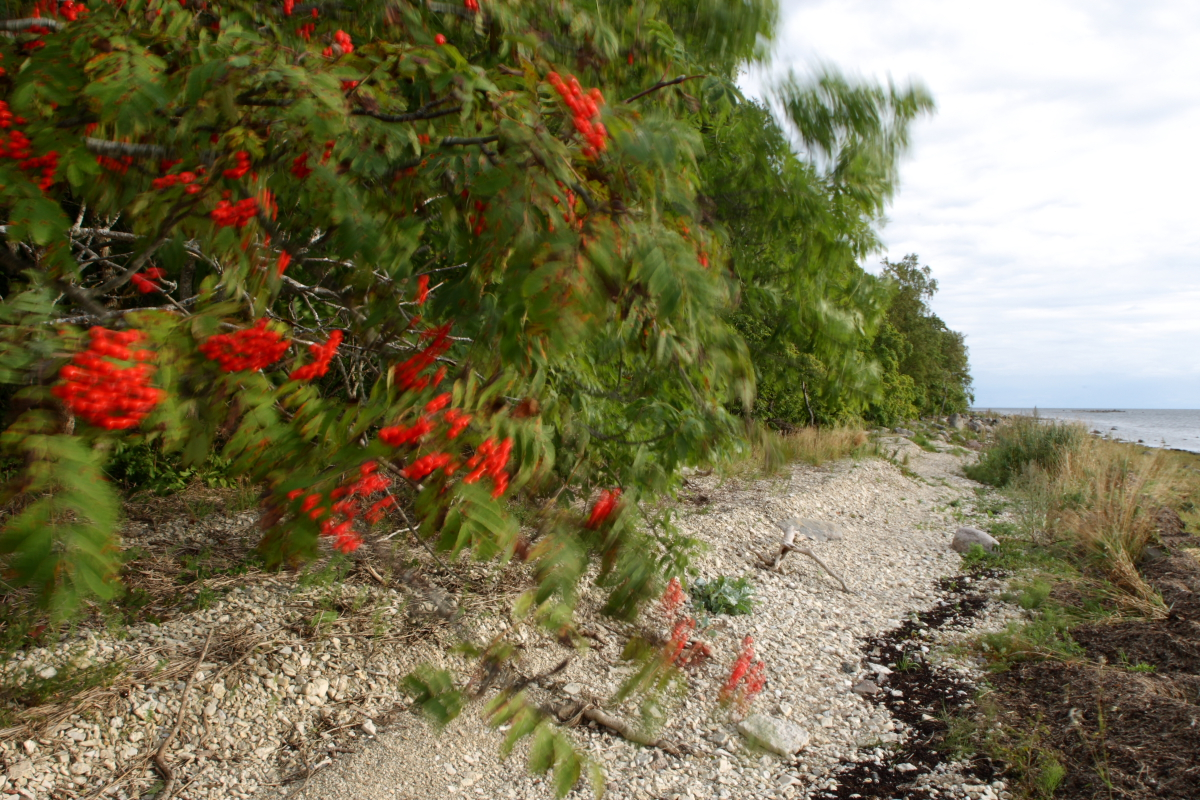
- Puhtulaid, Matsalu National Park

- Flag Coat of arms

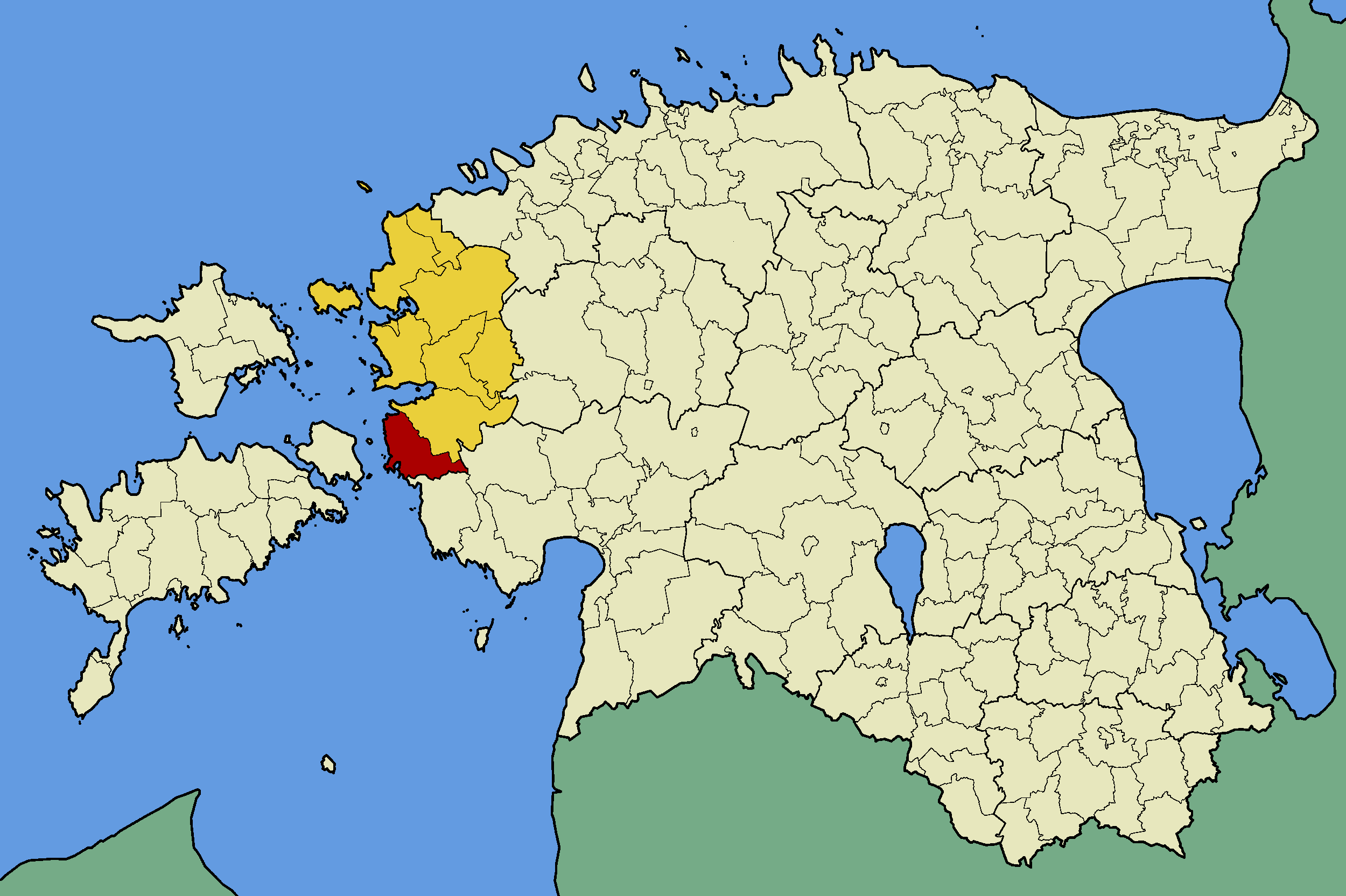
- Hanila Parish within Lääne County.
- Country: Estonia
- County: Lääne County
- Administrative centre: Kõmsi

Area
  - Total: 232 km^{2} (90 sq mi)

Population (2006)
  - Total: 1,679
  - Density: 7.24/km^{2} (18.7/sq mi)
- Website: www.hanila.ee

Hanila Parish (Estonian: Hanila vald) was a rural municipality of Estonia, in Lääne County. It had a population of 1,679 (2006) and an area of 232 km^{2} (90 sq mi). In 2017, Hanila Parish, Lihula Parish, Koonga Parish, and Varbla Parish were merged to form Lääneranna Parish.

== Local government ==
Current chairman of the council (est: volikogu esimees) was Mardo Leiumaa. The mayor (est: vallavanem) was Arno Peksar.

== Populated places ==
Hanila Parish had one small town and 28 villages.

=== Small town ===
Virtsu

=== Villages ===
- Äila
- Esivere
- Hanila
- Karuse
- Kaseküla
- Kause
- Kinksi
- Kiska
- Kõera
- Kokuta
- Kõmsi
- Kuke
- Linnuse
- Lõo
- Mäense
- Massu
- Mõisaküla
- Nehatu
- Nurmsi
- Pajumaa
- Pivarootsi
- Rame
- Rannaküla
- Ridase
- Salevere
- Ullaste
- Vatla
- Voose.

== See also ==
- Hanila museum
- Battle of Karuse
