= Vaiste Nature Reserve =

Protected area in Estonia

- Location within Estonia
- Location: Estonia
- Coordinates: 58°22′N 23°52′E
- Area: 161 ha (400 acres)
- Established: 2007

Vaiste Nature Reserve is a nature reserve which is located in Pärnu County, Estonia.

The area of the nature reserve is 161 ha.

The protected area was founded in 2007 to protect valuable habitat types and threatened species in Vaiste and Saare village (both in former Varbla Parish).
