= Varbla Parish =

Former municipality of Estonia

Coordinates: 58.432°N 23.761°E

Varbla Parish Varbla vald
- Former municipality of Estonia
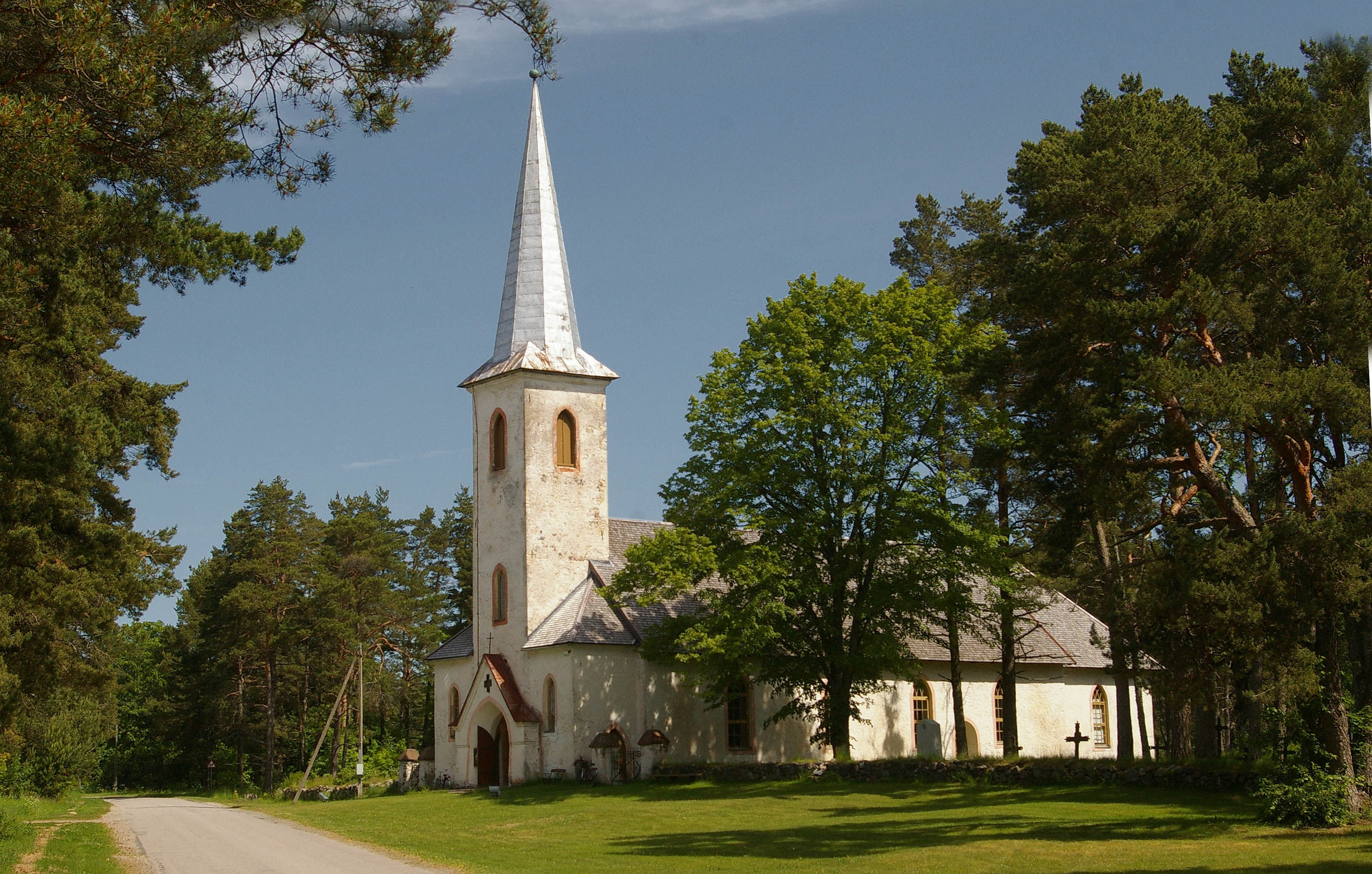
- Varbla church

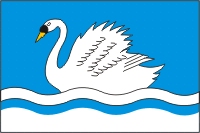
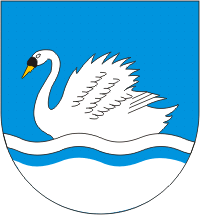
- Flag Coat of arms

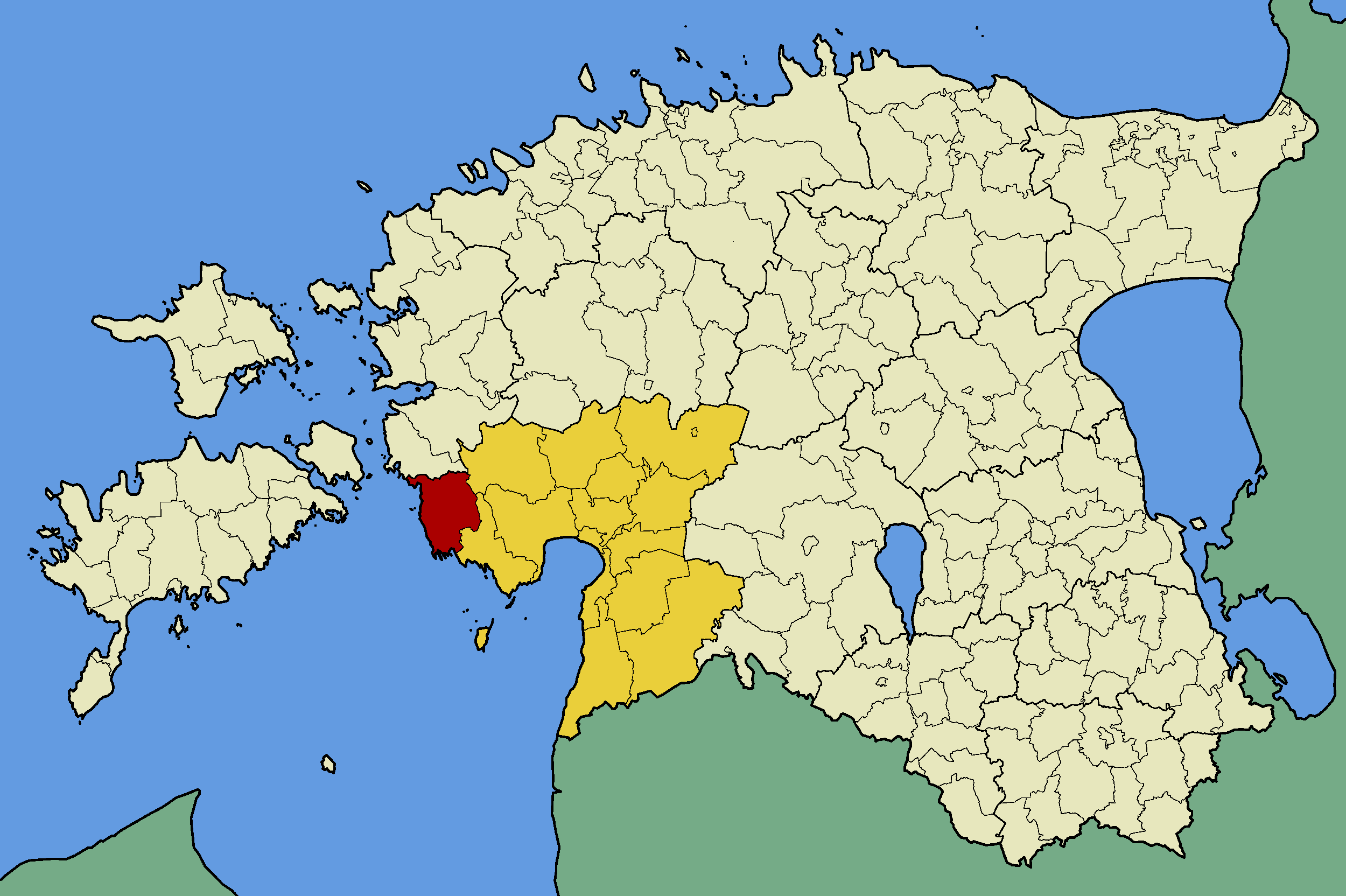
- Varbla Parish within Pärnu County.
- Country: Estonia
- County: Pärnu County
- Administrative centre: Varbla

Area
  - Total: 314 km^{2} (121 sq mi)

Population (01.01.2006)
  - Total: 1,013
  - Density: 3.23/km^{2} (8.36/sq mi)
- Website: www.varbla.ee

Varbla (German: Werpel) was an Estonian municipality located in Pärnu County. It had a population of 1013 on 1 January 2006 and an area of 314 km^{2} (121 sq mi). In 2017, Varbla Parish, Lihula Parish, Hanila Parish, and Koonga Parish were merged to form Lääneranna Parish.

== Settlements ==
=== Villages ===
- Allika
- Ännikse
- Aruküla
- Helmküla
- Haapsi
- Hõbesalu
- Kadaka
- Kanamardi
- Käru
- Kidise
- Kilgi
- Koeri
- Korju
- Kulli
- Maade
- Mäliküla
- Matsi
- Mereäärse
- Mõtsu
- Muriste
- Nõmme
- Õhu
- Paadrema
- Paatsalu
- Piha
- Rädi
- Raespa
- Raheste
- Rannaküla
- Rauksi
- Saare
- Saulepi
- Selja
- Sookalda
- Tamba
- Täpsi
- Tiilima
- Tõusi
- Vaiste
- Varbla
