= Piiukaarelaid =

Island in Estonia

Coordinates: 58°28′0″N 23°40′0″E

Piiukaarelaid (alternatively: Piiukaare laid and Piiulaid) is a small, uninhabited islet in the Baltic Sea belonging to the country of Estonia. Piiukaarelaid has an approximate area of 8.5 hectares and a circumference of 1.8 kilometers and is administered by the village of Mereäärse, Varbla Parish, Pärnu County. The islet is fully protected as part of the Varbla Islets Landscape reserve (Estonian: Varbla laidude maastikukaitseala), and is an important breeding site for 54 species of birds, including: the velvet scoter, the little tern, the red-backed shrike, the curlew, the common tern, the Arctic tern, the redshank, the northern shoveler, the gadwall, the black-tailed godwit, the Greylag goose the tufted duck, the mute swan, the common gull, the goosander, the common eider, the lapwing, and others.
