= Kuke =

Kuke may refer to several places in Estonia:

- Kuke, Lääne County, village in Lääne-Nigula Parish, Lääne County
- Kuke, Pärnu County, village in Lääneranna Parish, Pärnu County
- Kuke, Saare County, village in Saaremaa Parish, Saare County
