= Puhtu-Laelatu Nature Reserve =

Protected area in Estonia

- Puhtu-Laelatu looduskaitseala
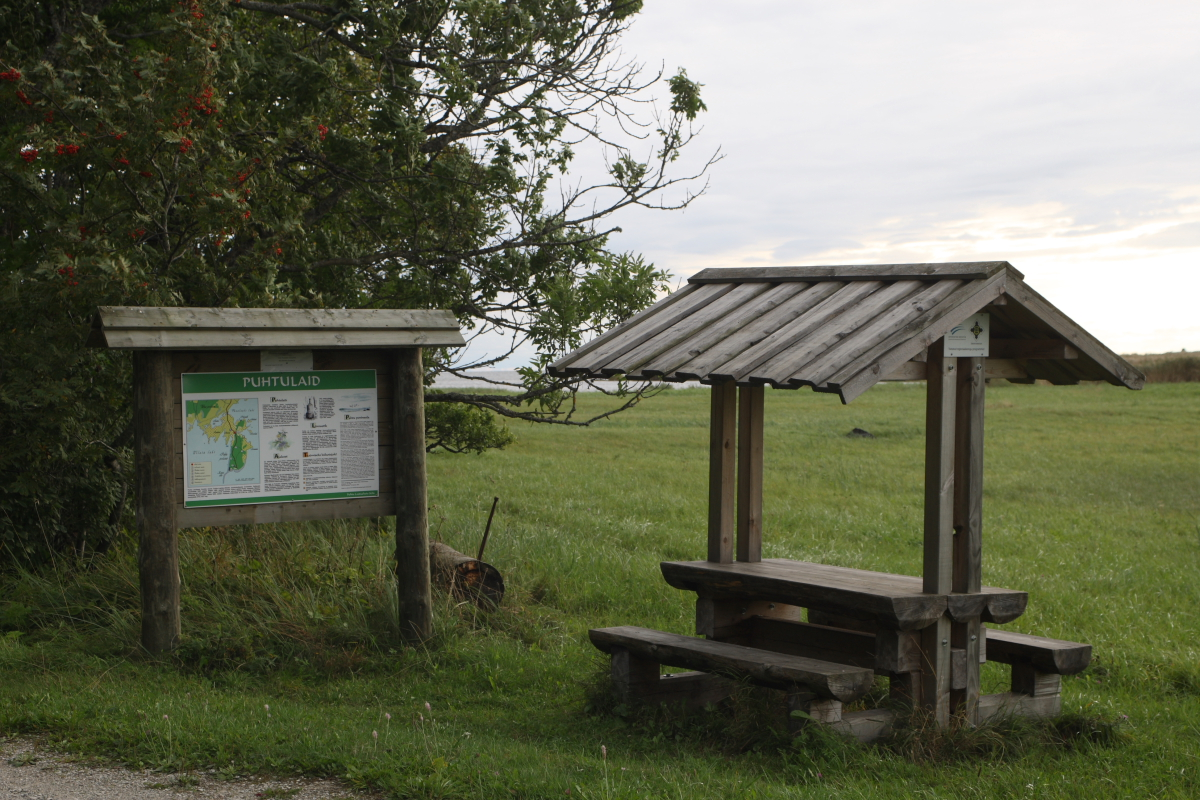

- Location within Estonia
- Location: Estonia
- Nearest city: Haapsalu
- Coordinates: 58°33′26″N 23°33′04″E
- Area: 2,700 ha (6,700 acres)

Ramsar Wetland
- Official name: Puhtu-Laelatu-Nehatu Wetland Complex
- Designated: 17 June 1997
- Reference no.: 911

Puhtu-Laelatu Nature Reserve is a nature reserve situated in western Estonia, in Lääne County. It is located in the territory of Pivarootsi, Rame and Hanila villages and in Virtsu small borough.

The nature reserve encompasses parts of Puhtu peninsula and nearby Laelatu wooded meadows. The nature reserve is a species-rich conservation area comprising mainly herb-rich forested areas, coastal meadows and alvars. It is the only known place in Estonia where the orchid Dactylorhiza × ruthei grows. Other rare species include Cypripedium calceolus and Angelica palustris.

== See also ==
- Puhtu Biological Station

== Gallery ==
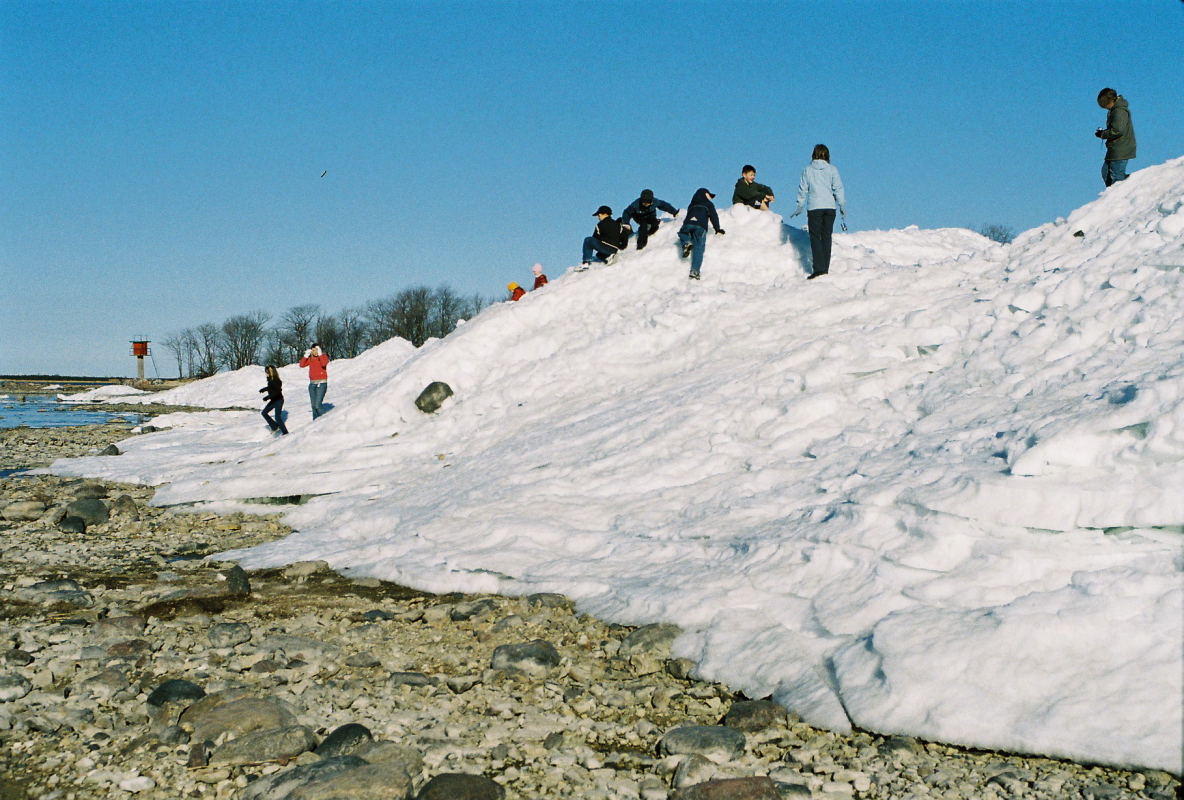
Mountains of ice in spring

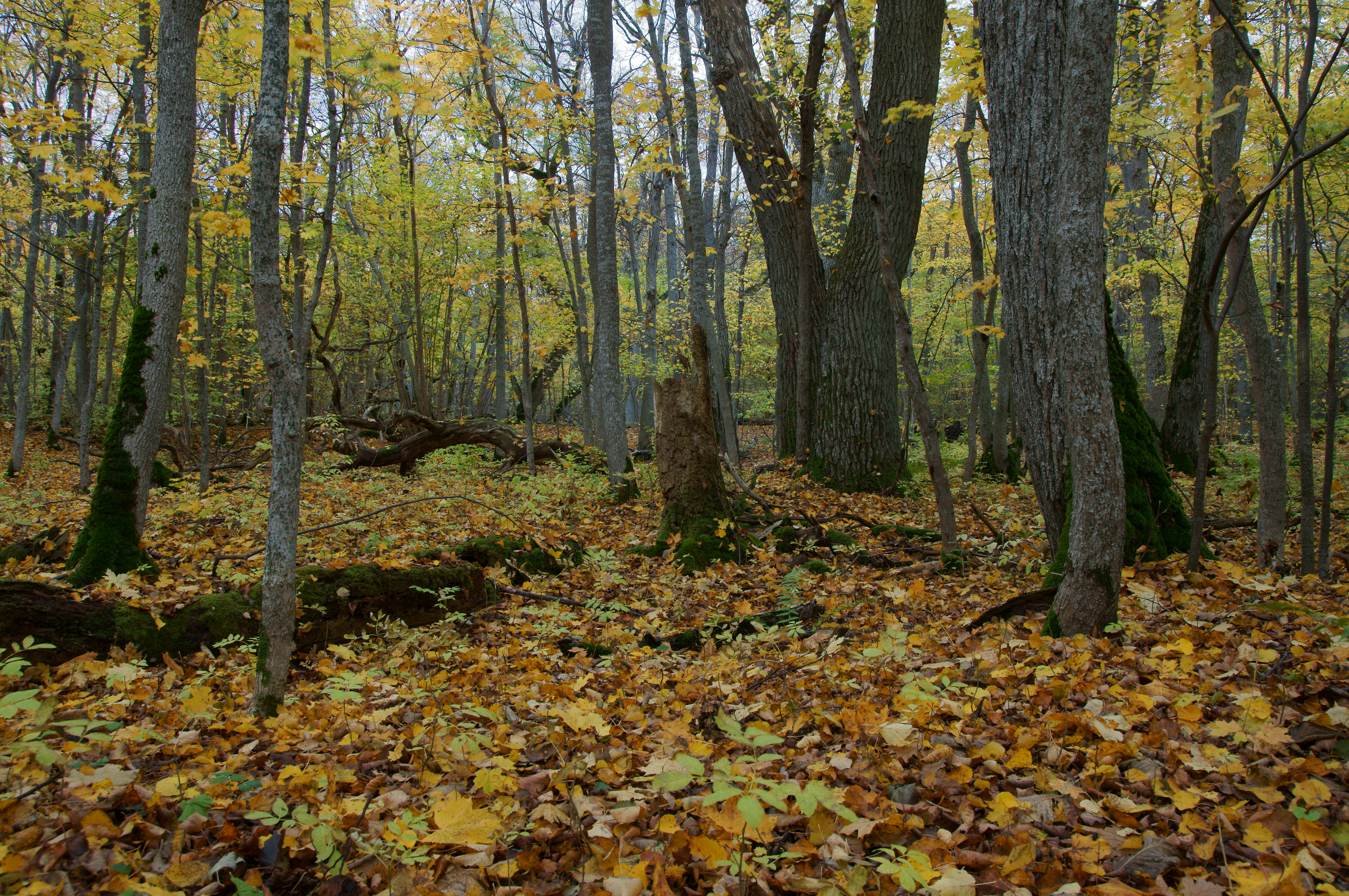
Autumn forest

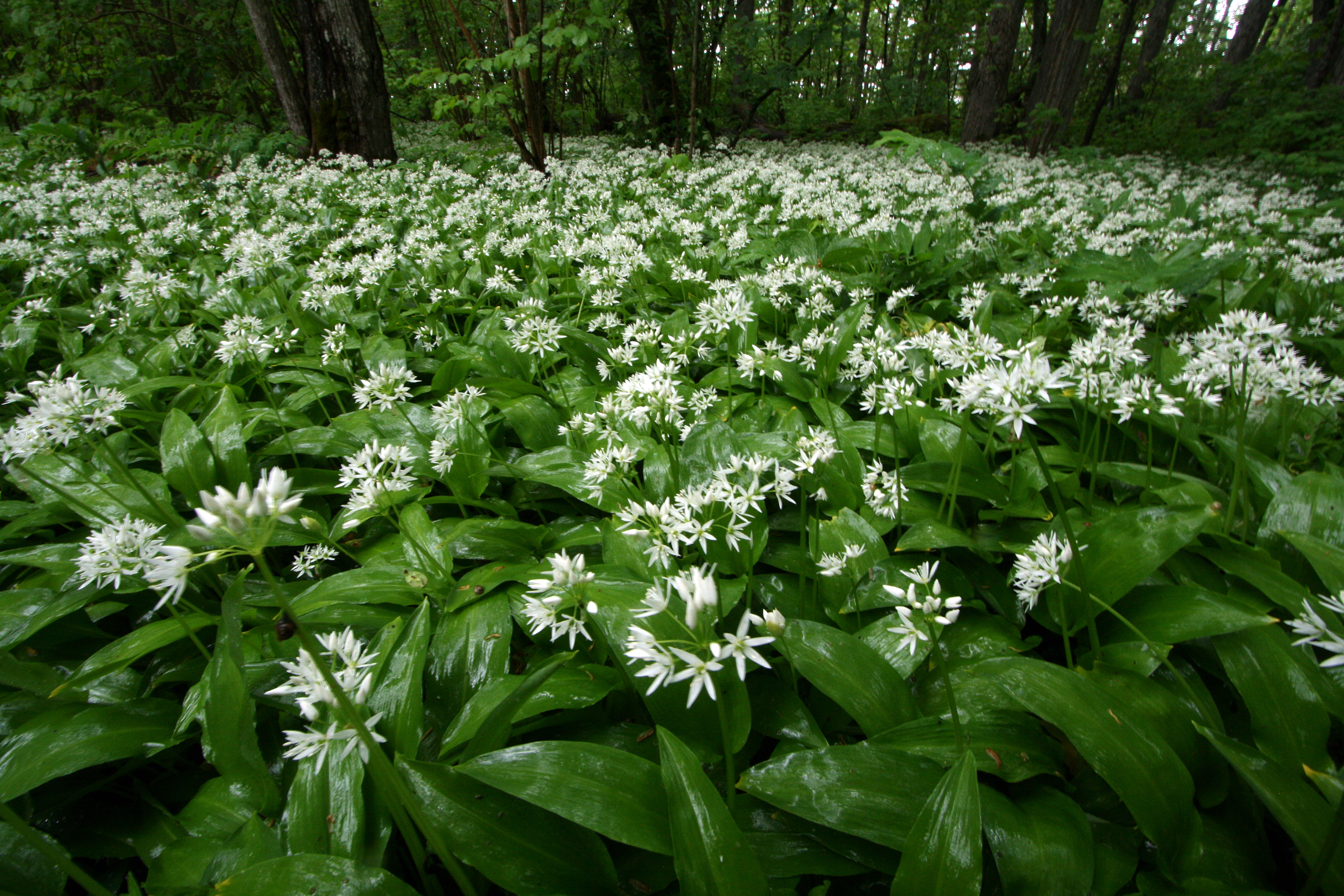
Allium ursinum

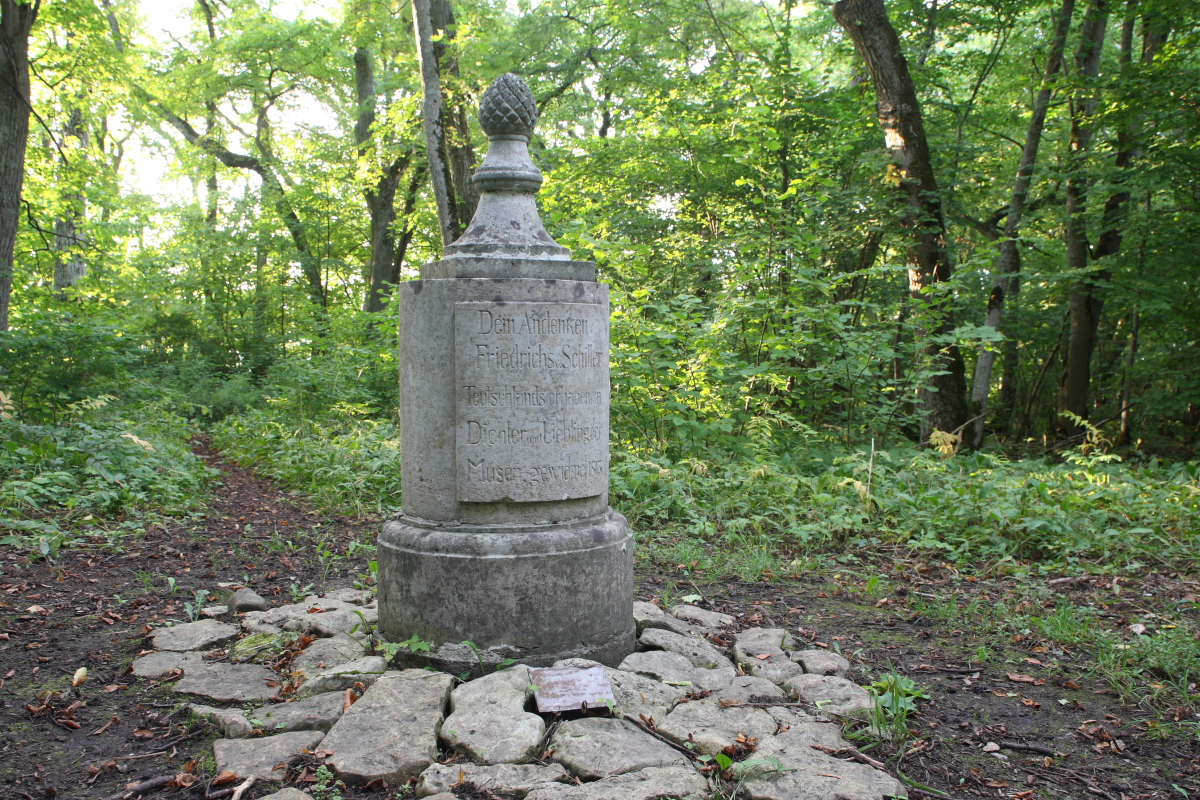
Memorial to Friedrich Schiller in Puhtu

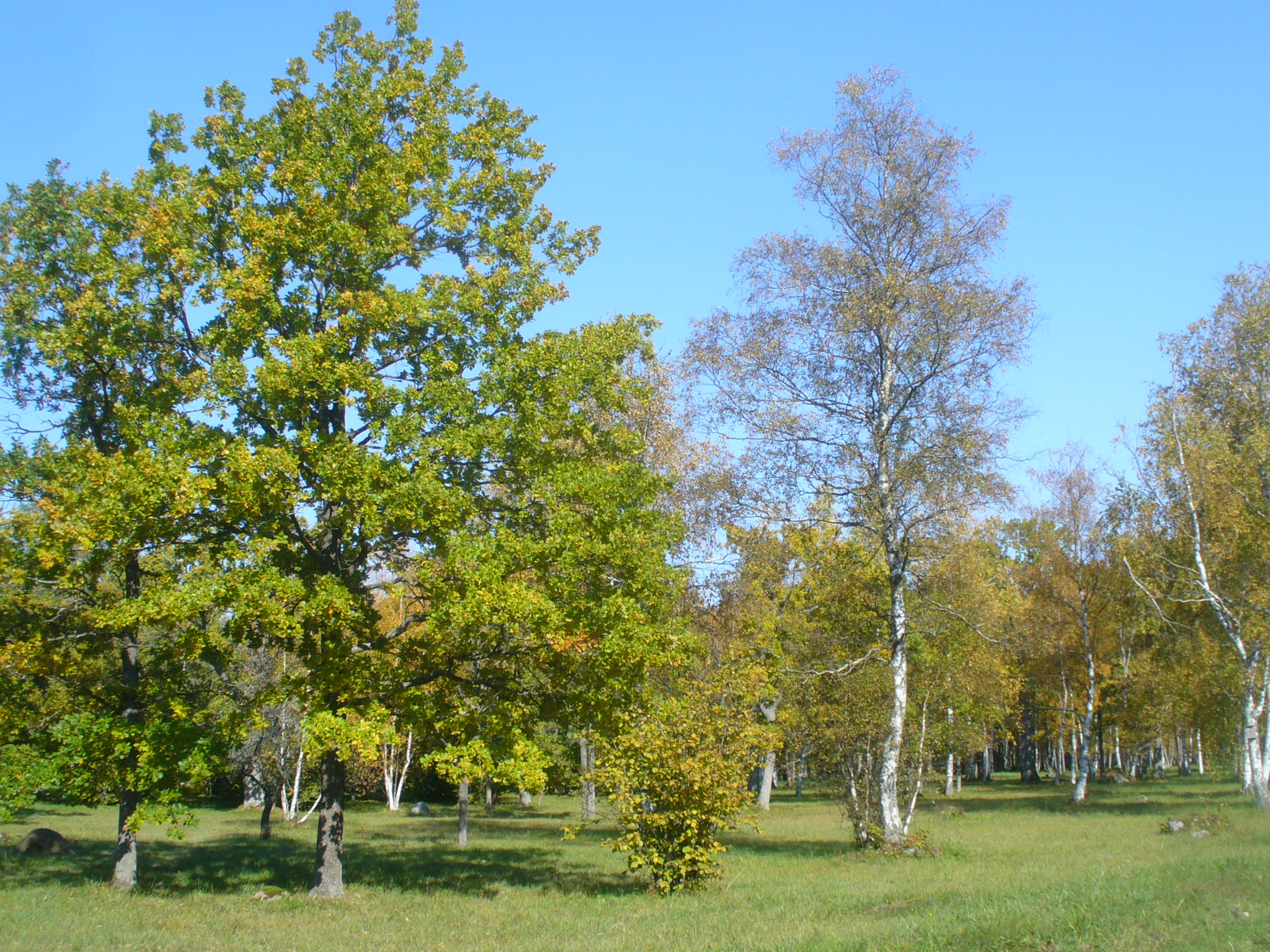
Laelatu wooded meadow on September
