= Puhtu Biological Station =

Biological station in Estonia

Puhtu Biological Station is a research station located in Pärnu county Lääneranna Parish, Estonia, at the coast of Baltic Sea. It is one of the oldest biology stations in Estonia.

The station is in the Puhtu peninsula, at the territory of Puhtu-Laelatu Nature Reserve, some kilometers from Laelatu Biological Station. It is an important bird area. The main building was built in 1920s and belonged to the biologist Jakob von Uexküll. In 1949, after World War II, it became an official research station. It is known for ornithology research, especially bird ecophysiology and ecology. Puhtu biology station belonged to the Estonian Institute of Zoology and Botany, and since 1997 to the Estonian University of Life Sciences (since the institute joined the university).

== Gallery ==
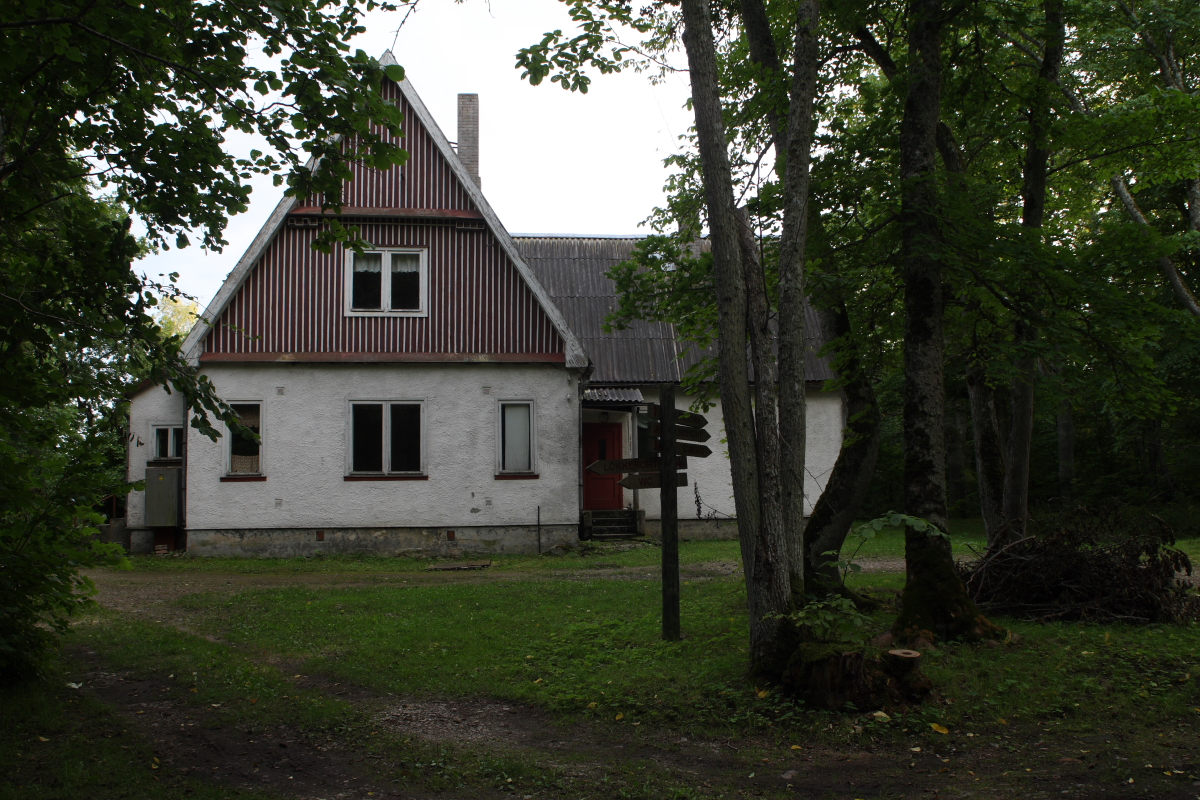
The main building of the biology station, the Baron's House.

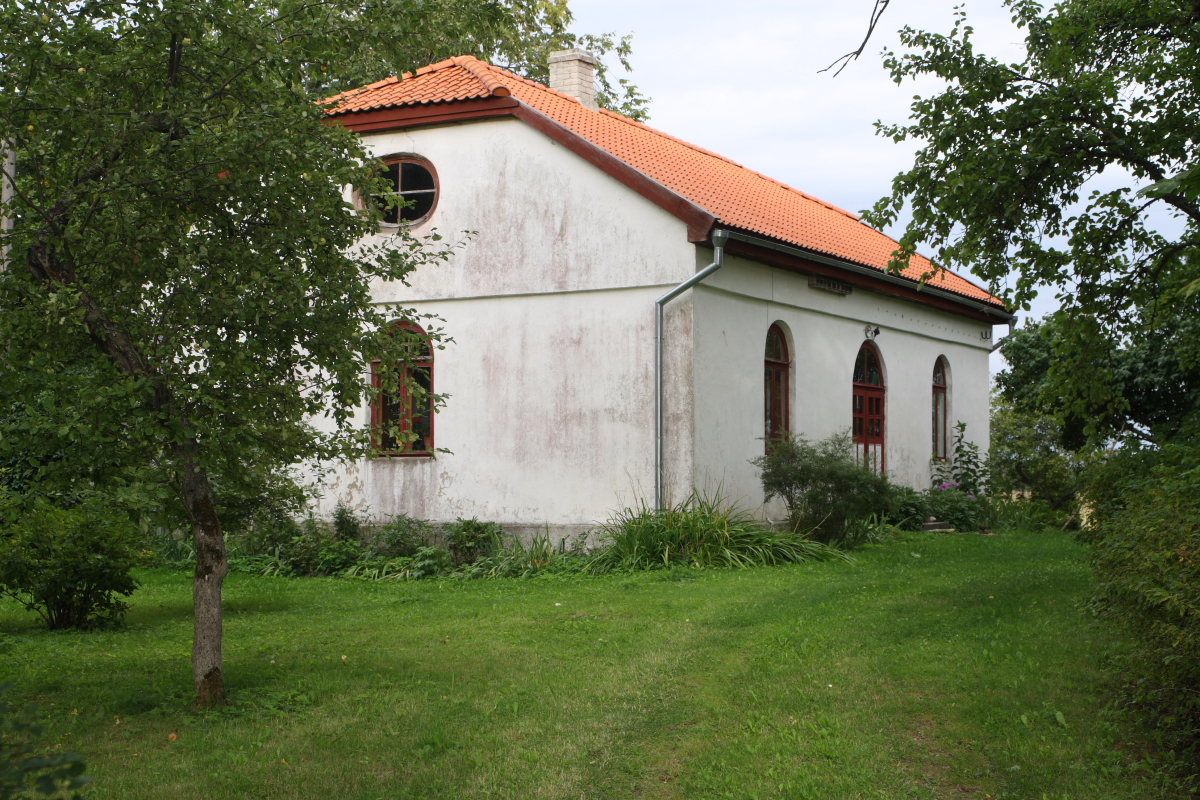
The guardian house, the Count's House.

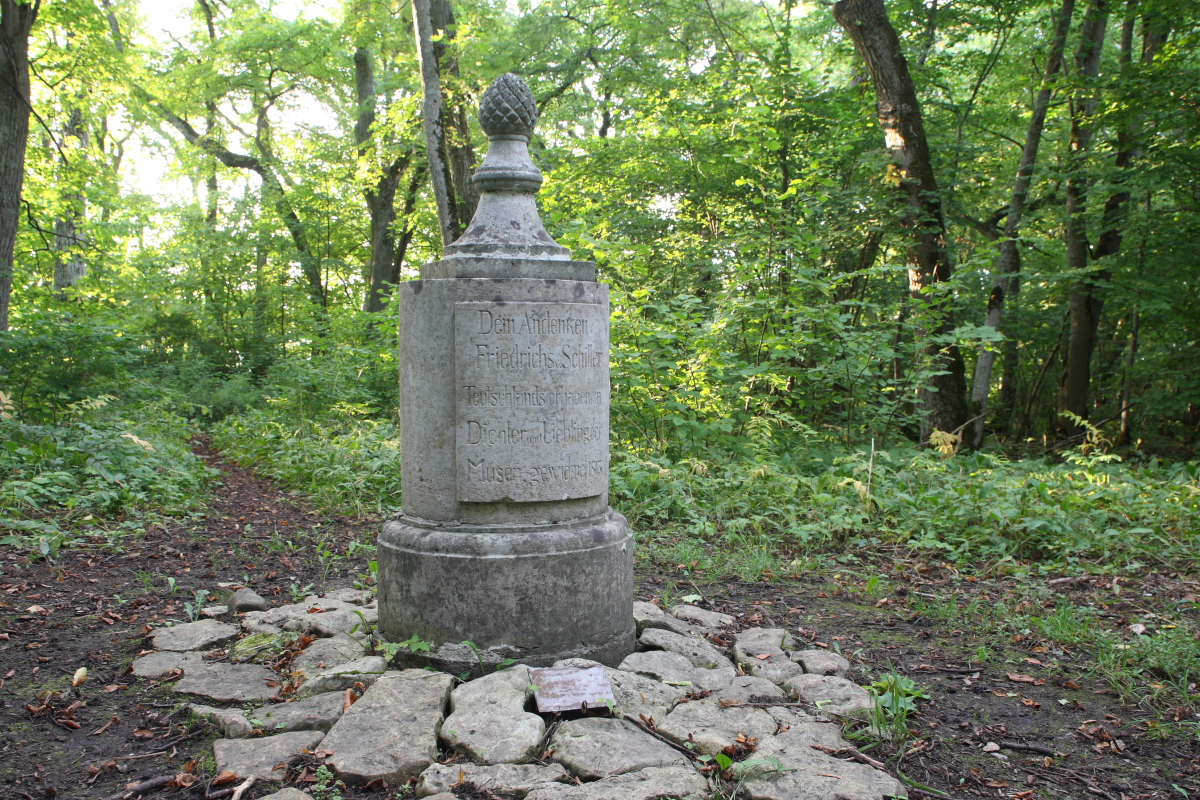
Memorial to German poet Friedrich Schiller from 1813.

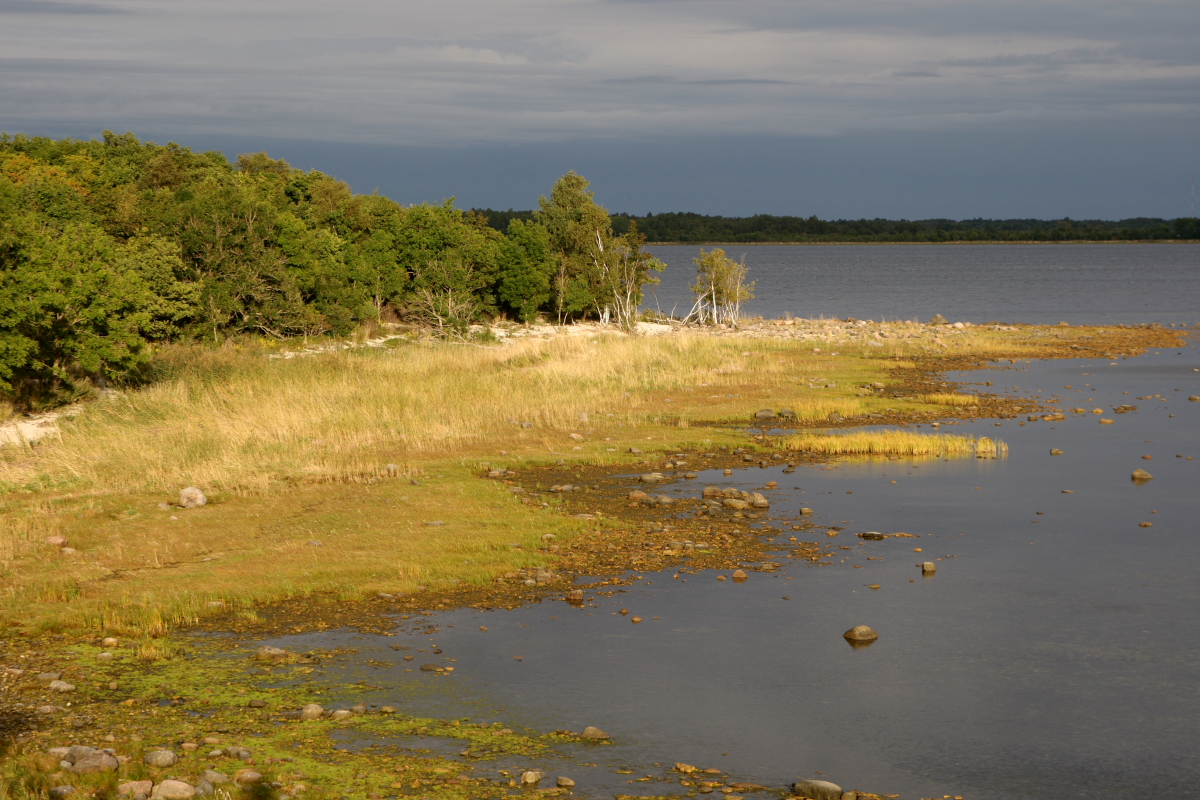
coast

== Sources ==
- Toomas Kukk (ed.) 2010. Puhtu ajalugu ja loodus. Estonia Maritima 8.
