= Mäense =

Village in Estonia

Coordinates: 58°40′N 23°38′E

- Village
- Interactive map of Mäense
- Country: Estonia
- County: Pärnu County
- Parish: Lääneranna Parish
- Time zone: UTC+2 (EET)
  - Summer (DST): UTC+3 (EEST)

Mäense is a village in Lääneranna Parish, Pärnu County, in western Estonia, covering 6.537 km^{2}. It is located along the Highway 190 which links the village to National Road 10, and is 1 kilometre away from Massu, the nearest village, and about 110 km in straight-line distance and 128 km in road distance away from Tallinn, the capital of Estonia. It had a population of 20 in the 2000 census and a population of 12 in the 2011 Census. The population is 50% male (6 people) and 50% female (6 people), and there are no children under the age of 18, with 25% over 65 (3 people). All inhabitants of the village identify as ethnic Estonians. The village is surrounded by farmland and woodland.

== Facilities ==
The village has a single bus stop at the southern end, which provides the inhabitants of the village twice-a-day service to Lihula, once at around 7am and once at around 4:30pm.
