= Varbla =

Village in Estonia

- village
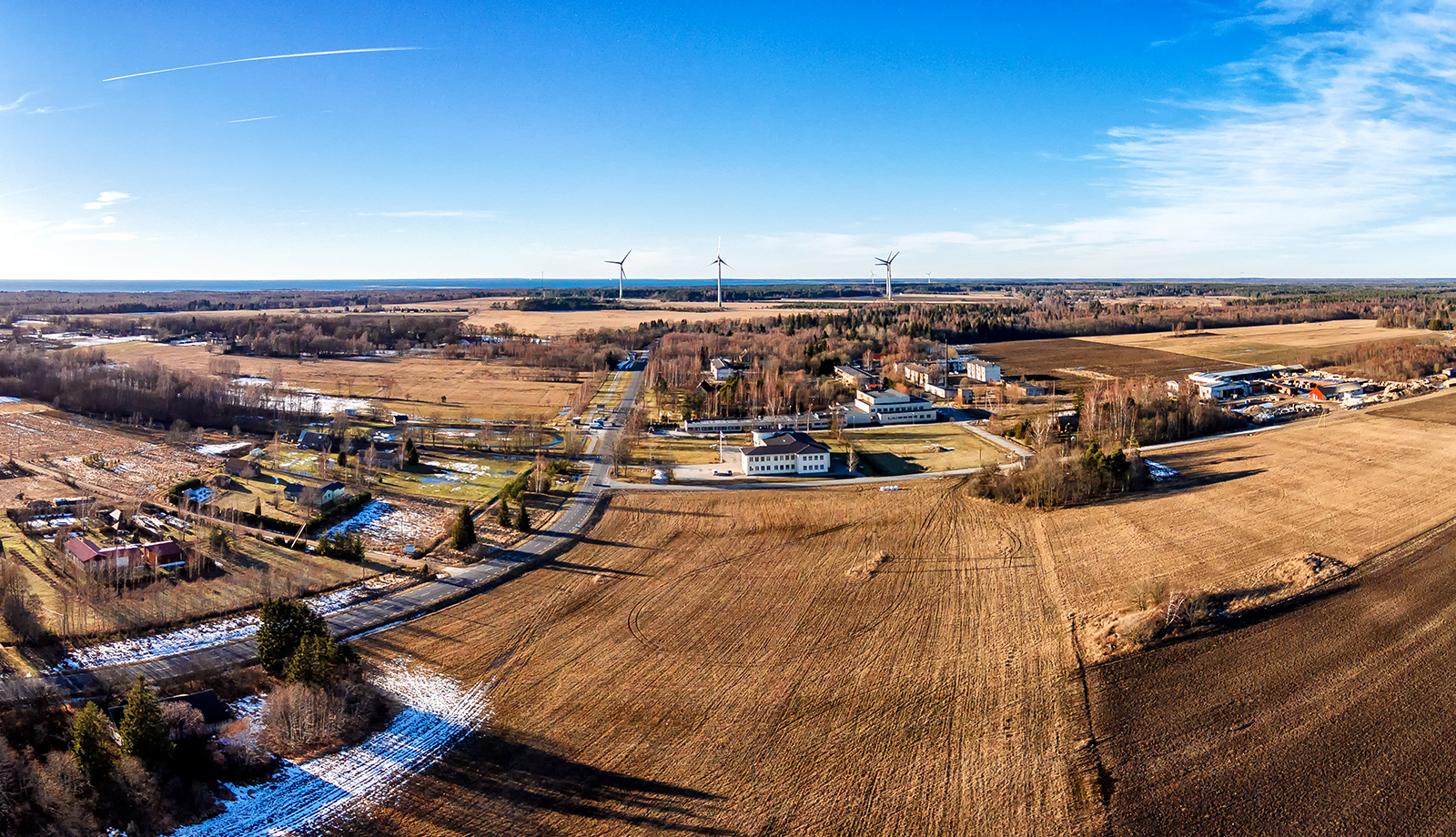

- Location in Estonia
- Coordinates: 58°25′57″N 23°44′48″E
- Country: Estonia
- County: Pärnu County
- Municipality: Lääneranna Parish

Population (01.01.2011)
  - Total: 133

Varbla (German: Werpel) is a village in Lääneranna Parish in Pärnu County, in southwestern Estonia. It was the administrative centre of Varbla Parish. Varbla has a population of 133 (as of 1 January 2011).

== Gallery ==
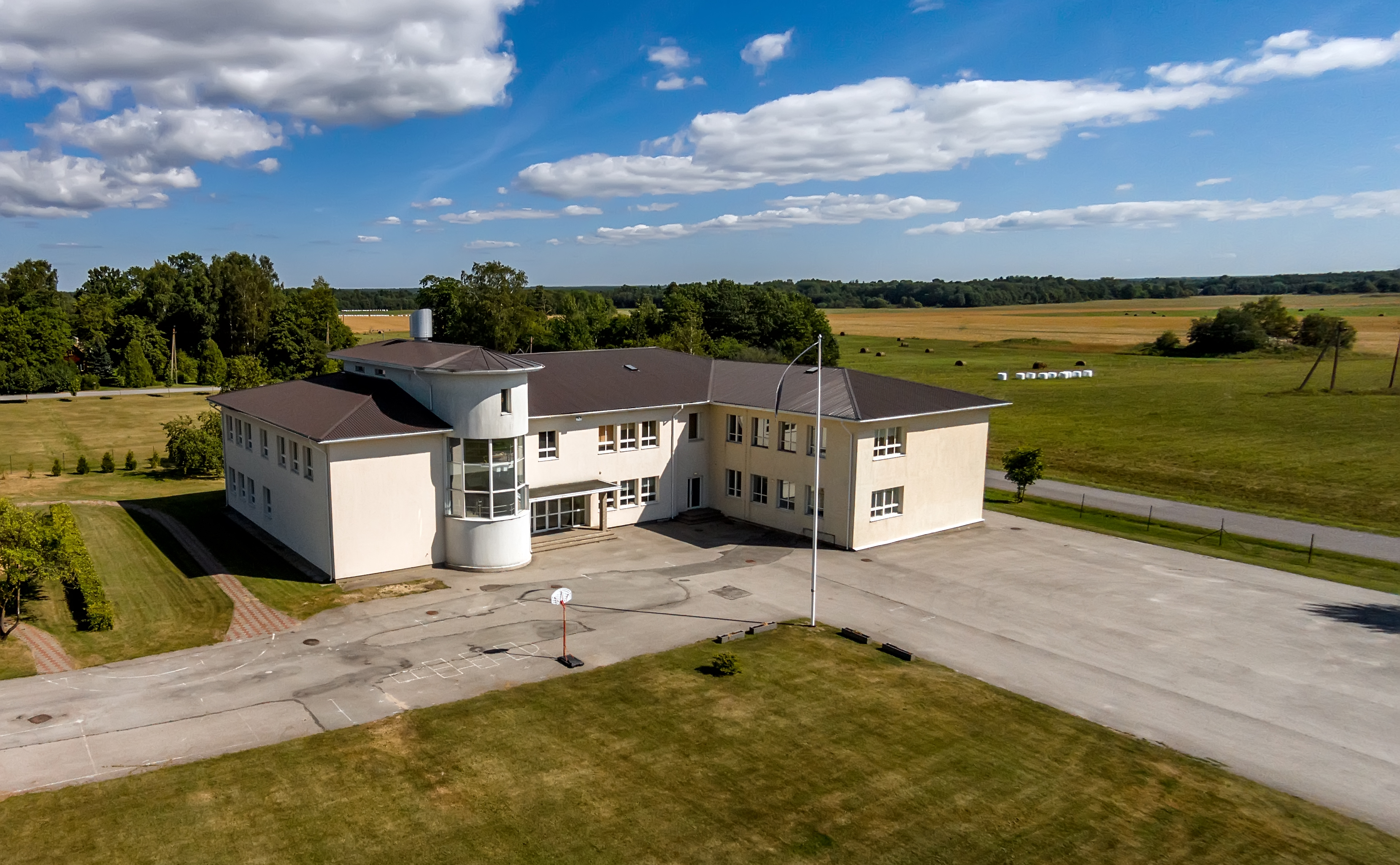
Varbla primary school

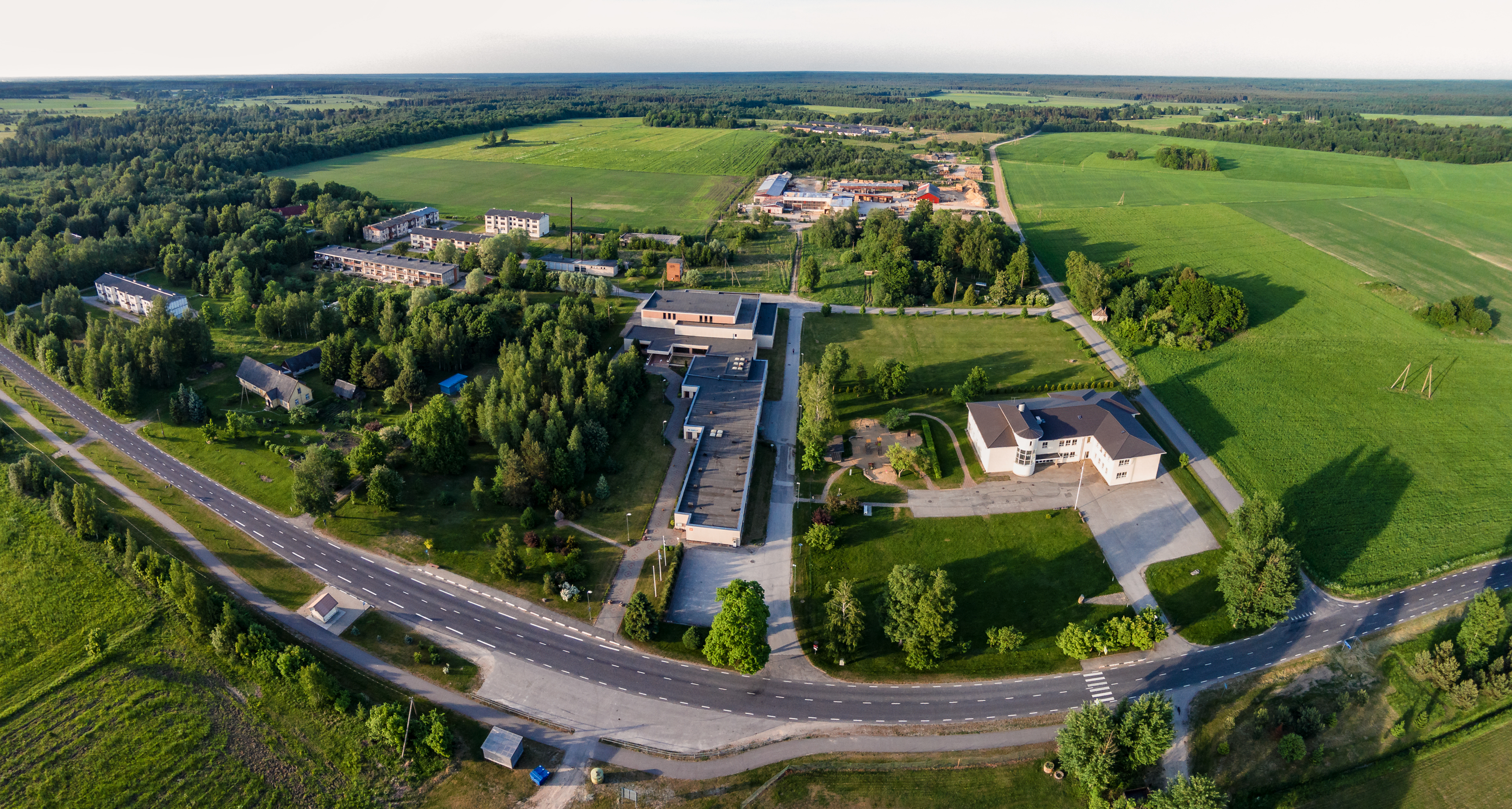
Aerial view of Varbla

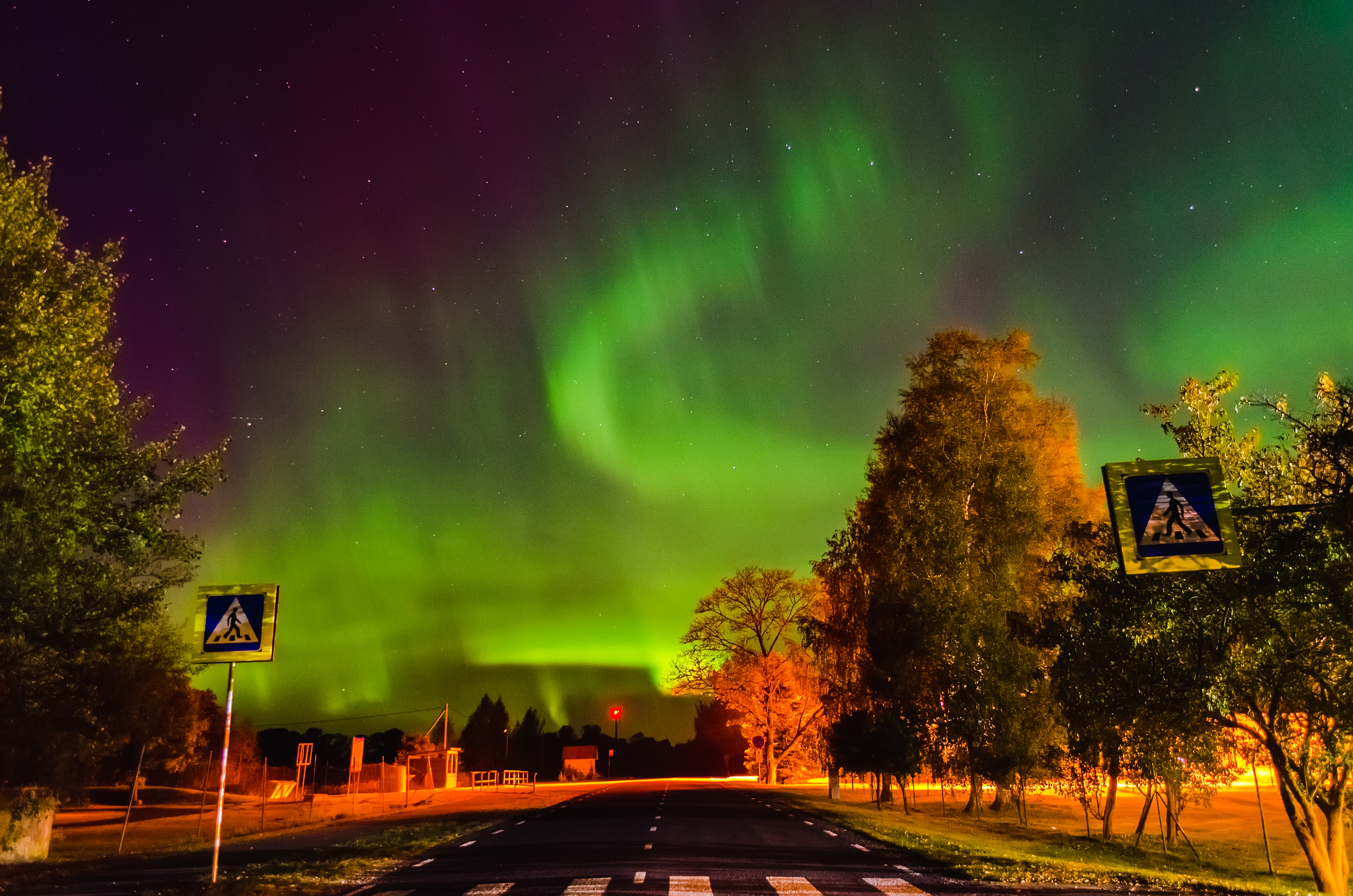
Aurora Borealis seen in Varbla
