= Mereäärse =

Village in Estonia

- village
- Location in Estonia
- Coordinates: 58°27′33″N 23°41′34″E
- Country: Estonia
- County: Pärnu County
- Municipality: Lääneranna Parish

Population (01.01.2011)
  - Total: 14

Mereäärse is a village in Lääneranna Parish, Pärnu County, in southwestern Estonia, on the coast of the Gulf of Riga. It has a population of 14 (as of 1 January 2011).

Several small islets near the coast also belong to Mereäärse village: Kitselaid, Pihelga laid, Piiukaarelaid, Põntsulaid, Pööriotsalaid, Raugilaid and Selglaid.
