= Ännikse =

Village in Estonia

- village
- Location in Estonia
- Coordinates: 58°28′59″N 23°49′02″E
- Country: Estonia
- County: Pärnu County
- Municipality: Lääneranna Parish

Population (01.01.2011)
  - Total: 10

Ännikse is a village in Lääneranna Parish, Pärnu County, in southwestern Estonia. It has a population of 10 (as of 1 January 2011).

Ännikse–Kilgi–Vaiste railway line for lumber transport operated from 1919 to 1950.
