= Puhtu =

Peninsula in Estonia

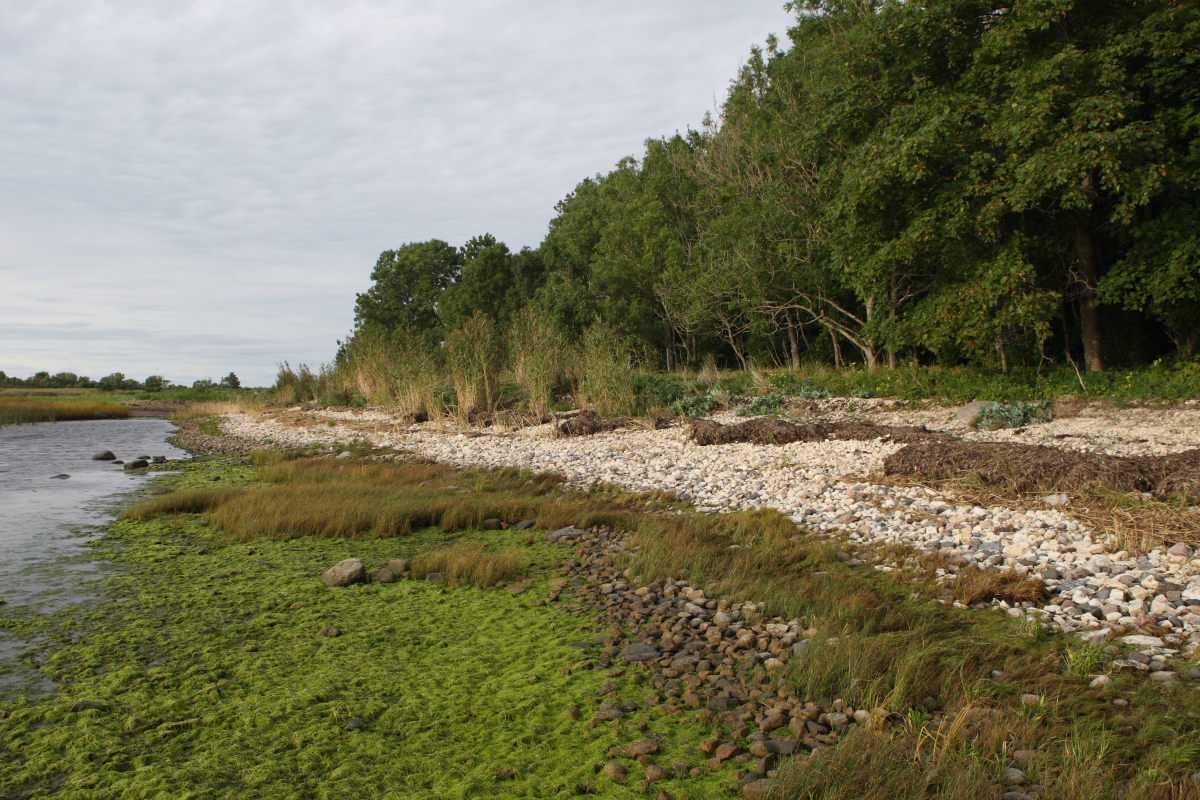
- Coast of Puhtu.
- Interactive map of Puhtu

Geography
- Coordinates: 58°34′N 23°33′E
- Archipelago: West Estonian archipelago
- Adjacent to: Gulf of Riga

Administration
- Estonia
- County: Lääne County
- Municipality: Lääneranna Parish
- Settlement: Virtsu small borough

Puhtu (also known as Puhtuaid) is a former islet and since the beginning of the 19th century a peninsula in western Estonia. Administratively it belongs to Virtsu small borough in Lääneranna Parish, Pärnu County.

Puhtu is covered by a speciose old broadleaf forest.

== History ==
Puhtulaid (Holm Puchten, Holm zum Pucht) was first mentioned in 1478 when it belonged to the von Uexküll family. The first buildings were erected in the 18th century by the owner of Vana-Virtsu Manor, Carl Thure von Helwig. He designed Puhtu as a private resort with three Chinese-style houses and alleys surrounded by hewn sculptures.

In 1813 Carl Thure von Helwig's widow Wilhelmine von Helwig ordered a memorial stone to a family friend, the German poet Friedrich Schiller (1759–1805). It is reputedly the earliest extant monument to Schiller in the world. During World War II the monument was heavily damaged, but it was restored by Paul Horma in 1958.

In 1857 a cattle manor building (now known as the Count's House) and a stable were built on Puhtu; both are extant today.

In the 19th century, the island was connected to the mainland by building a road with a bridge to Virtsu.

During World War I, Puhtu was used as a seaplane base by the Russians. The soldiers and officers lived in Puhtulaid's summerhouses. When they retreated, all the summerhouses were demolished and the von Helwig family graves were plundered.

Puhtu was acquired by the biologist Jakob von Uexküll, a professor at the University of Hamburg, in 1927. From 1929 to 1939 he spent some time nearly every summer in Puhtu. In the 1930s he built a new summerhouse on the southern end of the peninsula. In 1934 Jakob von Uexküll invited Count Alexander Keyserlingk, an amateur ornithologist, to be the guardian of Puhtu; he lived there until 1939.

In 1939 Puhtulaid and Adralaiud were placed under natural protection.

After World War II, Puhtu was given to Tartu State University and shortly after that to Estonian Academy of Sciences. The latter opened an ornithological station headed by Eerik Kumari on Puhtu.

In addition to the main building (the Baron's House, a summerhouse built by Jakob von Uexküll in the 1930s), the station consists of a laboratory and a birdwatching tower (built in the 1960s) and a guardian house (the Count's House, the cattle manor building from 1857, used by Alexander Keyserlingk).

Since 1995 Puhtu has belonged to Matsalu National Park, and since 1997 the station has operated as part of Estonian University of Life Sciences.

== See also ==
- Puhtu Biological Station
- Puhtu-Laelatu Nature Reserve

== Gallery ==
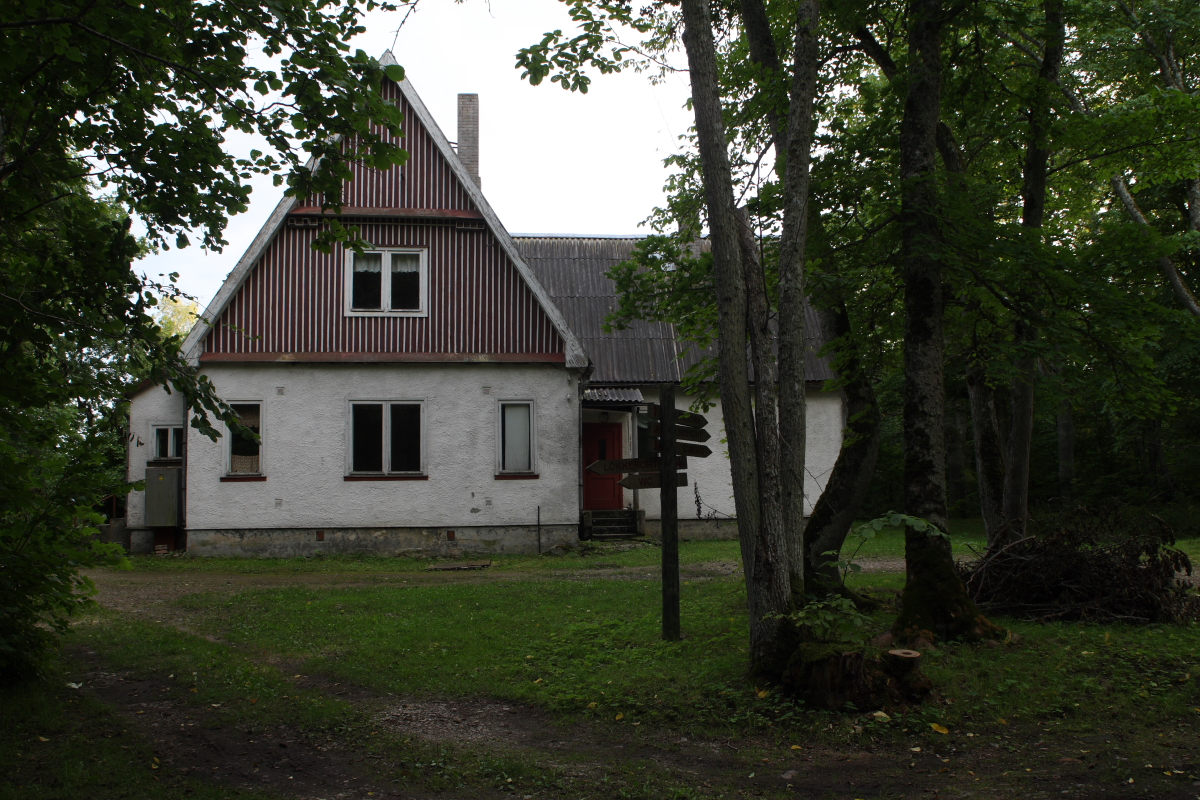
The main building of the biology station, the Baron's House.

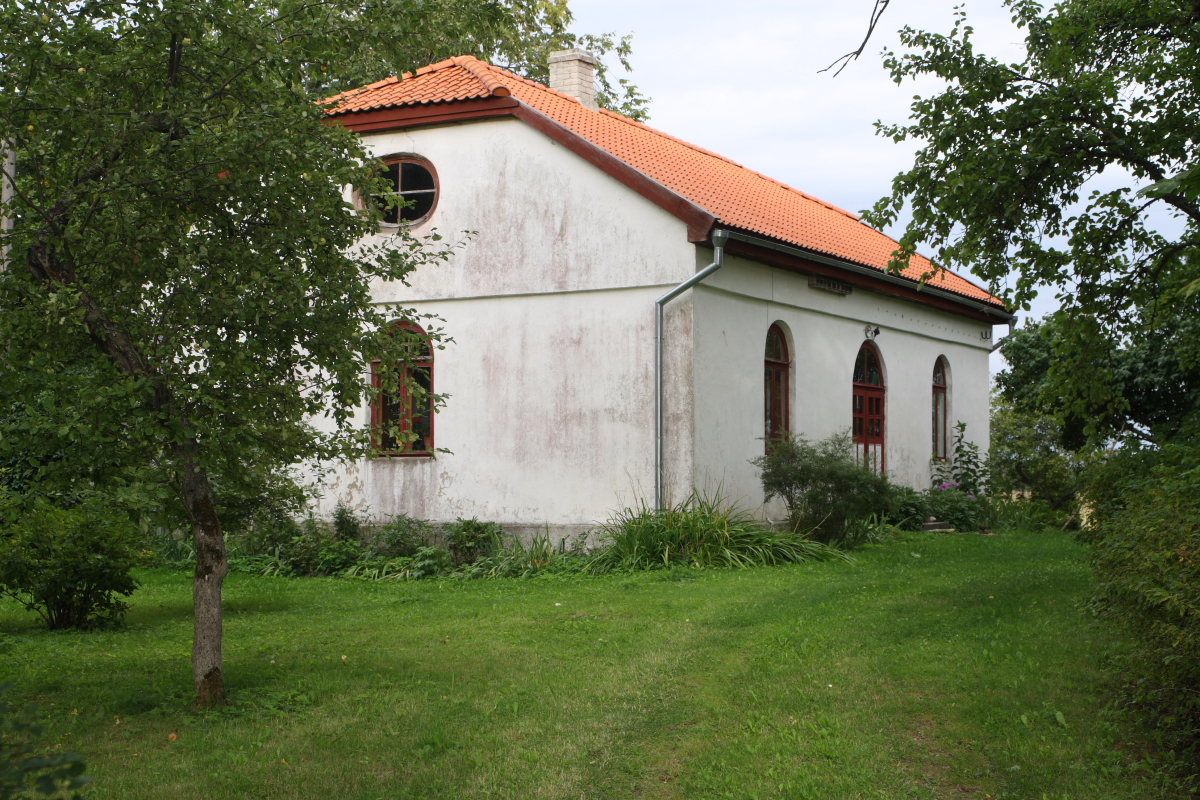
The guardian house, the Count's House.

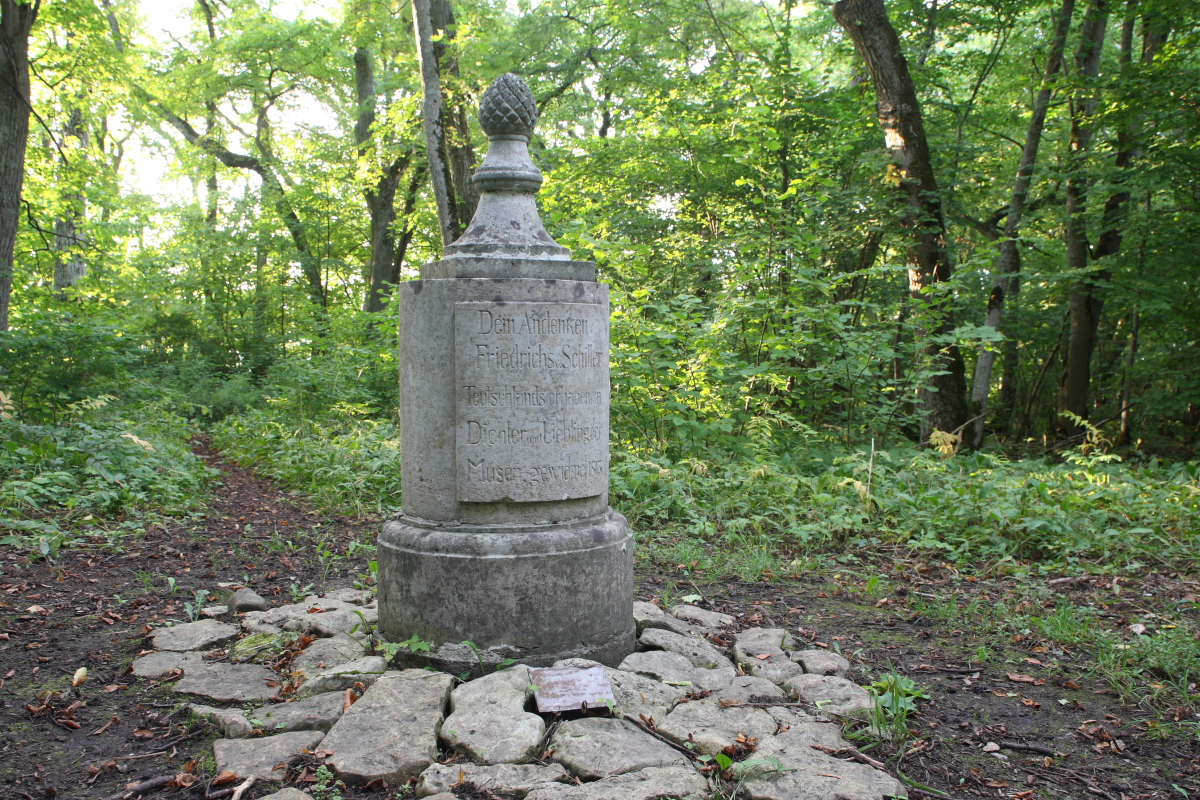
Memorial to German poet Friedrich Schiller from 1813.

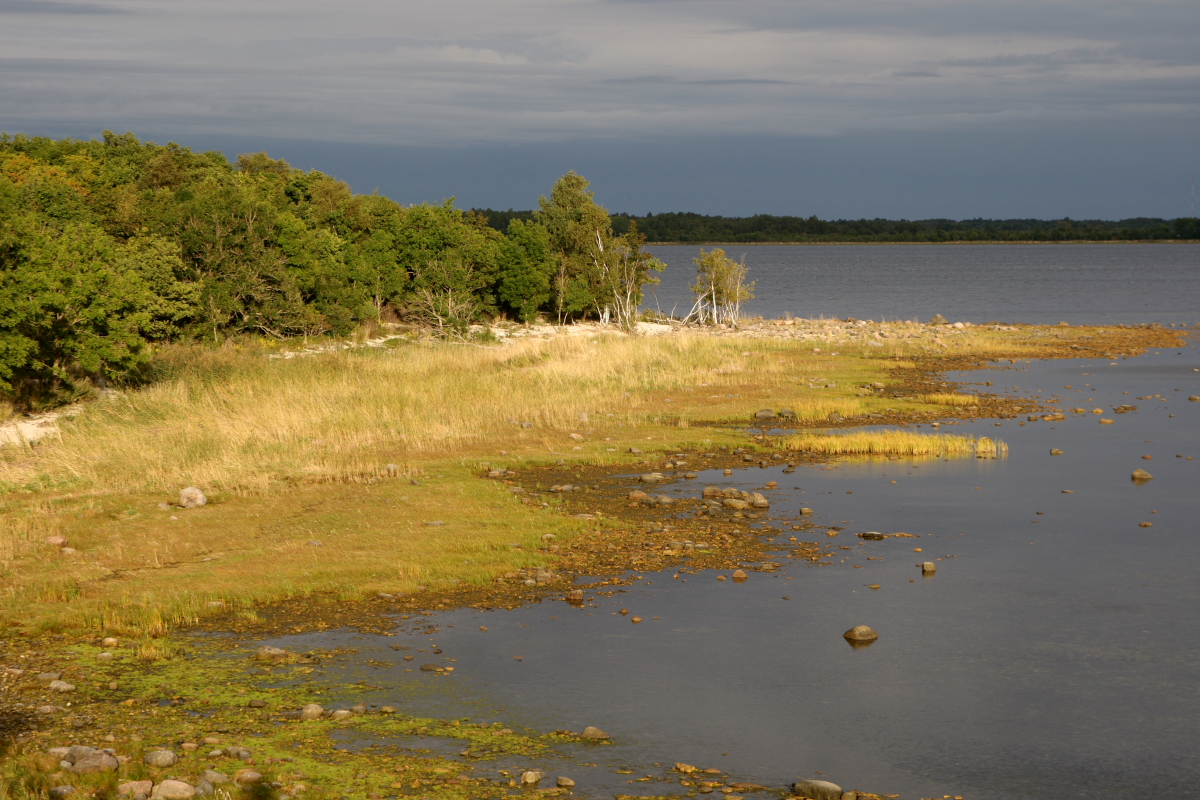
coast

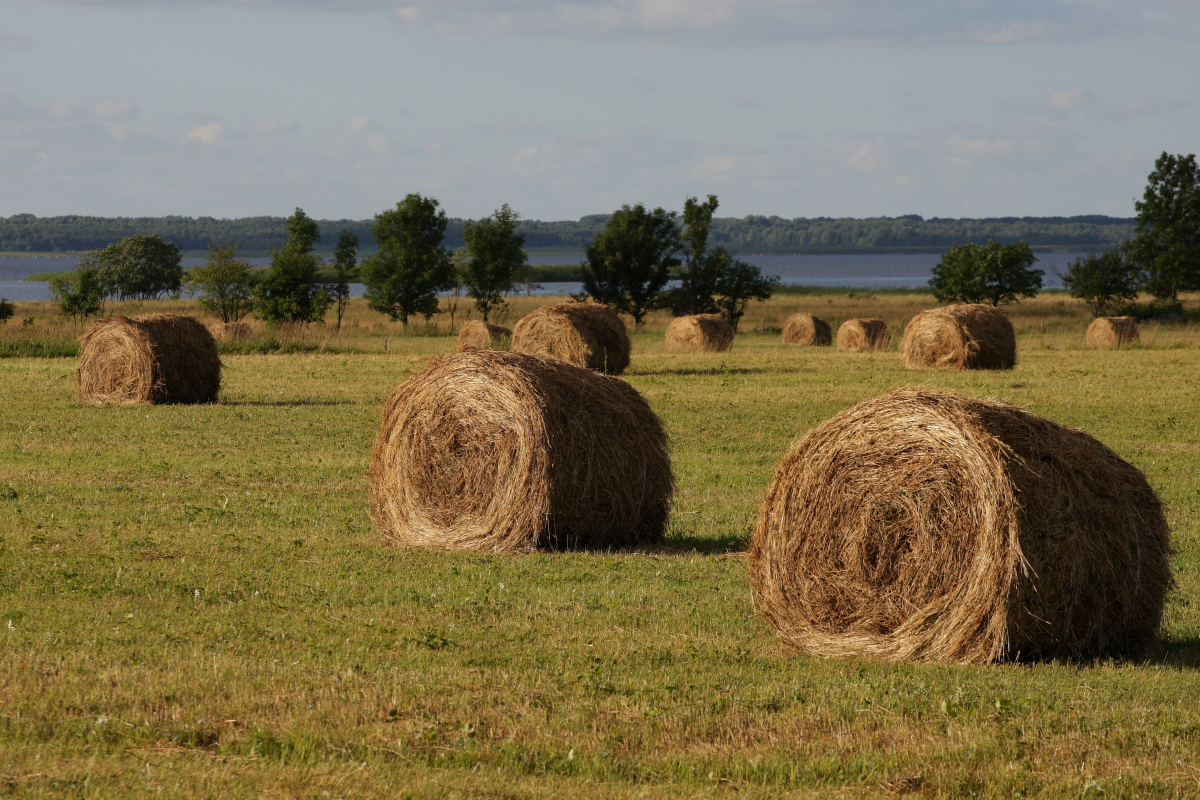
Hay bails

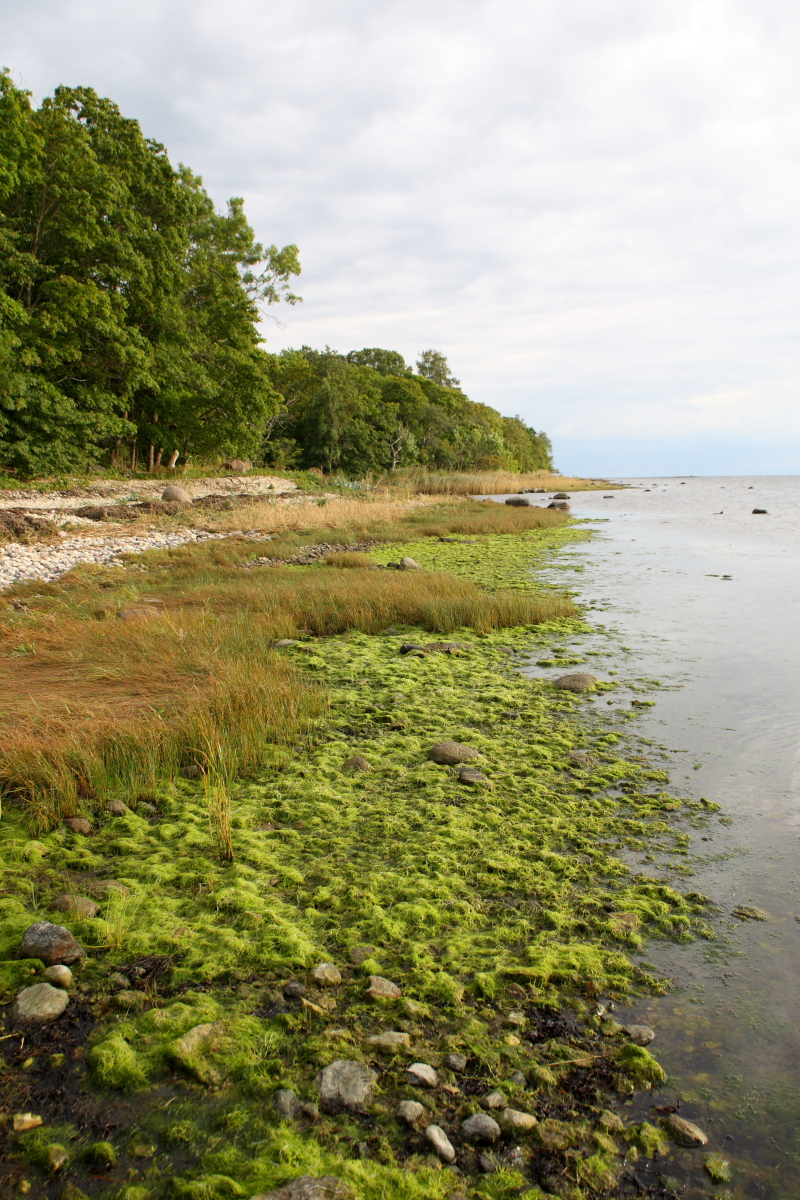

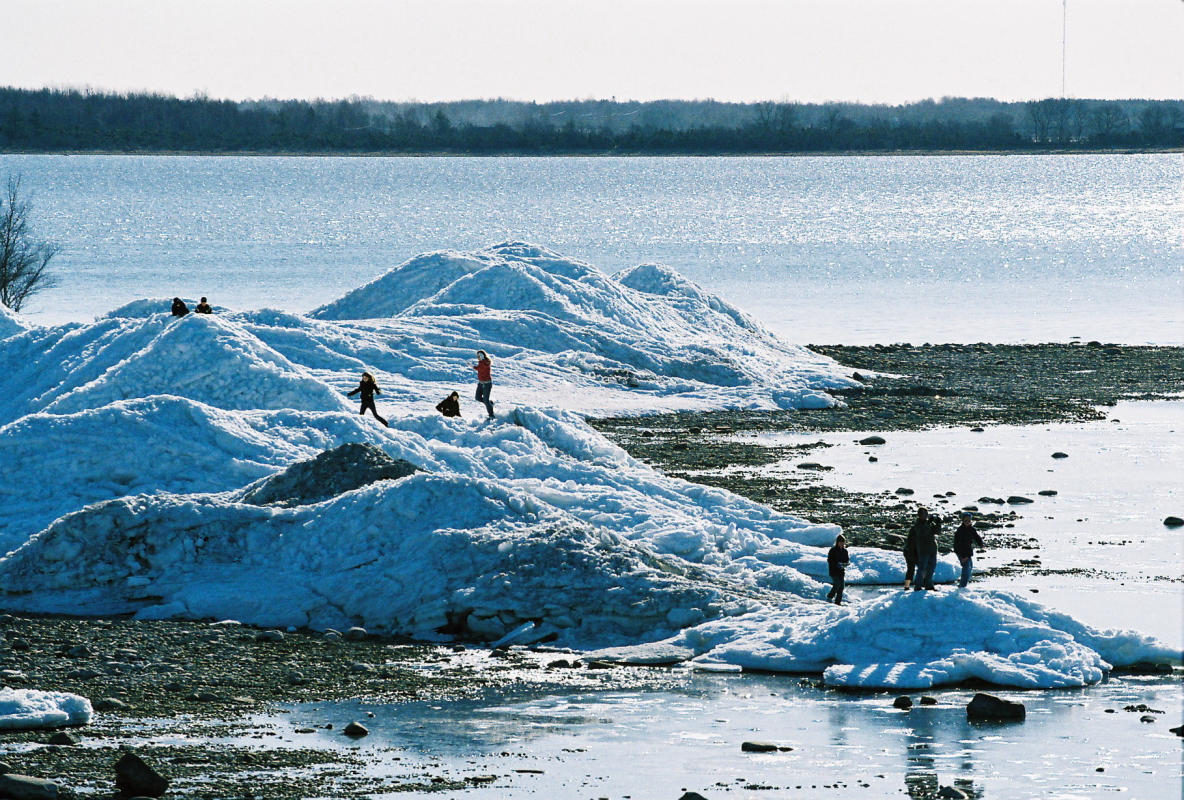
Hills of ice in April.

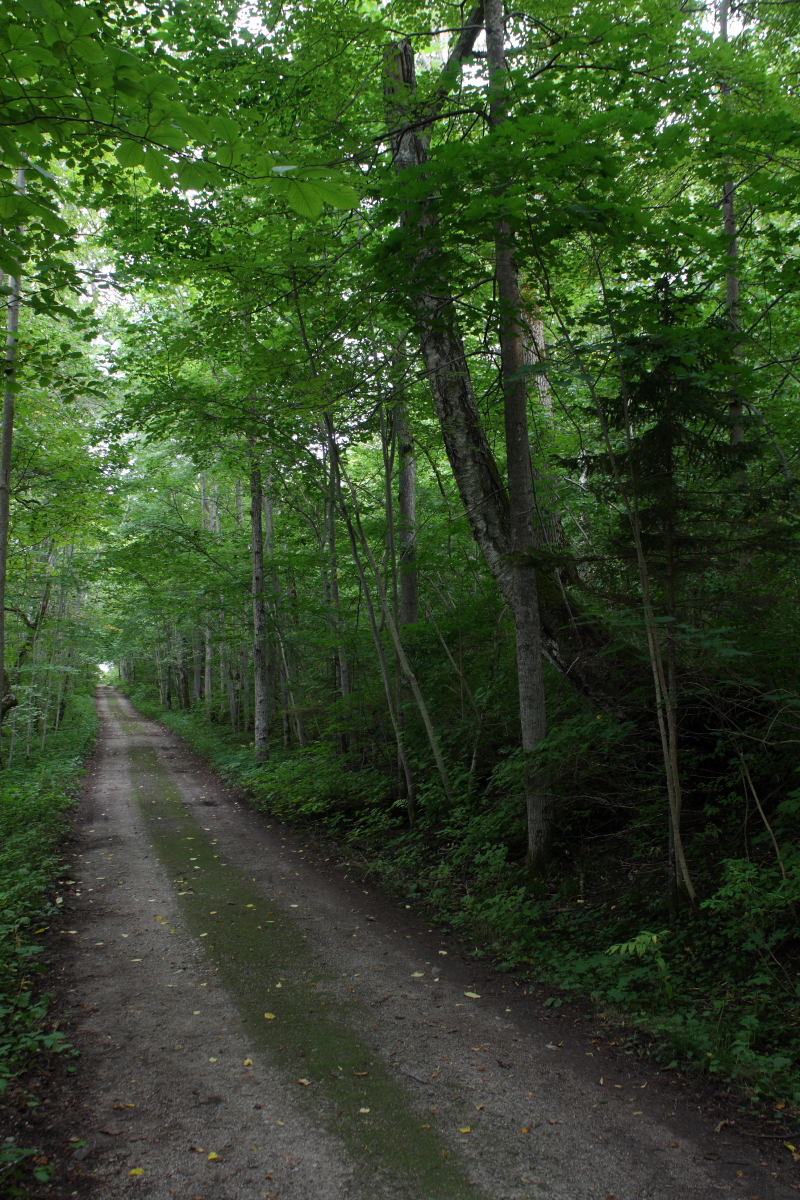
road
