= Vaiste =

Village in Estonia

- village
- Location in Estonia
- Coordinates: 58°21′13″N 23°51′20″E
- Country: Estonia
- County: Pärnu County
- Municipality: Lääneranna Parish

Population (01.01.2011)
  - Total: 33
- Website: www.saulepi.planet.ee

Vaiste (German: Waist) is a village in Lääneranna Parish, Pärnu County, in southwestern Estonia, on the coast of the Gulf of Riga. It has a population of 33 (as of 1 January 2011).

Vaiste (Waist) knight manor was established in 1661 by the owner of Vana-Varbla Manor Gustav Bauen. The latest 1-storey wooden main building was constructed in the 1880s when the owner was Roman von Nasackin. It was demolished in 1969–1970.

Ännikse–Kilgi–Vaiste railway line for lumber transport operated from 1919 to 1950.
