= Kõmsi =

Village in Estonia

Coordinates: 58°37′23″N 23°37′59″E

- Village
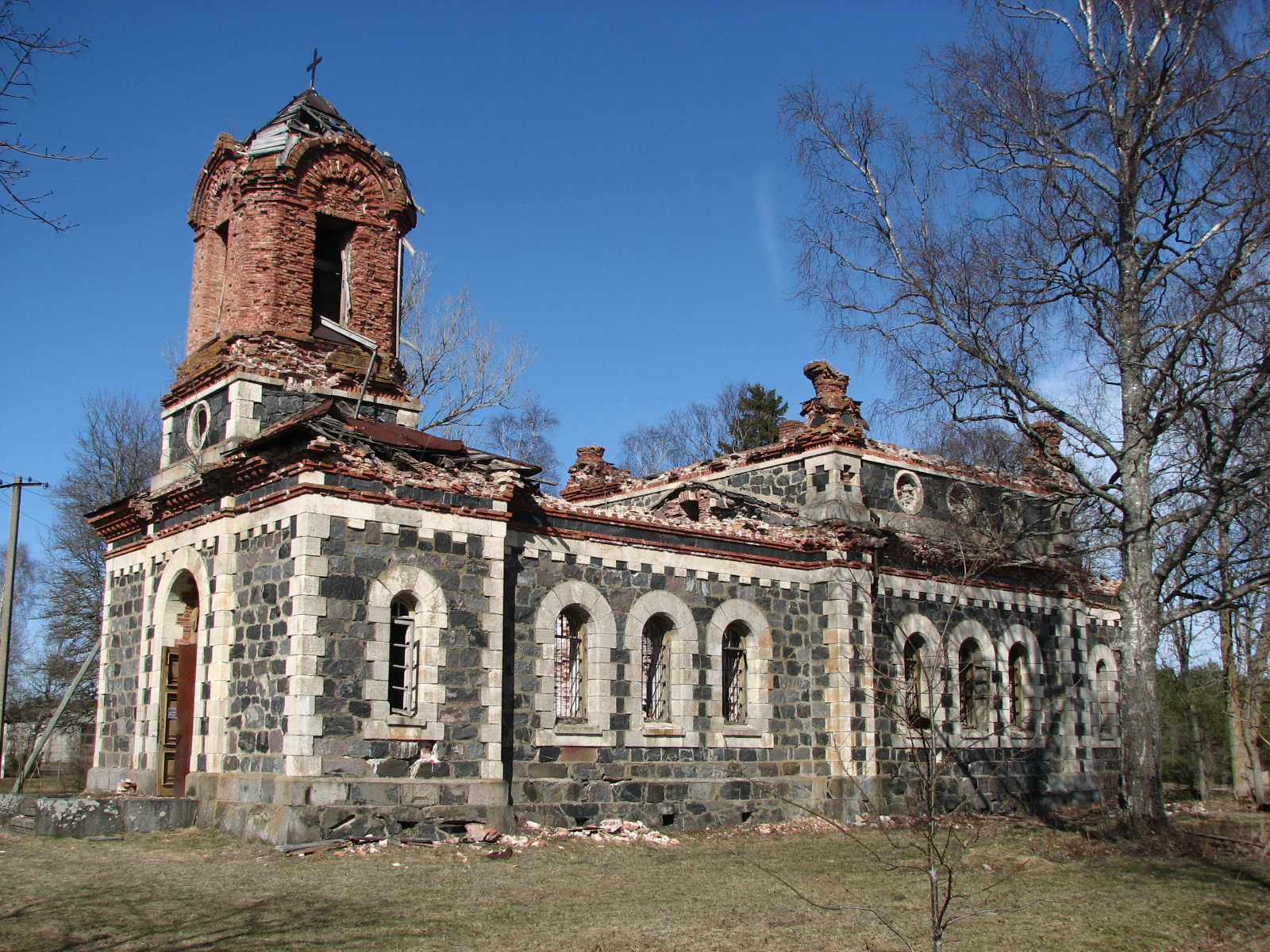
- Ruins of the Nativity of Christ Orthodox Church in Kõmsi.
- Interactive map of Kõmsi
- Country: Estonia
- County: Pärnu County
- Parish: Lääneranna Parish
- Time zone: UTC+2 (EET)
  - Summer (DST): UTC+3 (EEST)

Kõmsi is a village in Lääneranna Parish, Pärnu County, in western Estonia.

Archbishop of the Evangelical Lutheran Church of Estonia, Andres Põder (born 1949), was born in Kõmsi.
