= Massu, Lääneranna Parish =

Village in Estonia

Coordinates: 58°39′04″N 23°37′23″E

Massu
- Village
- Interactive map of Massu
- Country: Estonia
- County: Pärnu County
- Parish: Lääneranna Parish
- Time zone: UTC+2 (EET)
  - Summer (DST): UTC+3 (EEST)

Massu (German: Massau) is a village in Lääneranna Parish, Pärnu County, in western Estonia.
