= Kilgi, Pärnu County =

Village in Estonia

Kilgi
- village
- Location in Estonia
- Coordinates: 58°24′30″N 23°51′40″E
- Country: Estonia
- County: Pärnu County
- Municipality: Lääneranna Parish

Population (01.01.2011)
  - Total: 11

Kilgi is a village in Lääneranna Parish, Pärnu County, in southwestern Estonia. It has a population of 11 (as of 1 January 2011).

Ännikse–Kilgi–Vaiste railway line for lumber transport operated from 1919 to 1950.

Writer Karl Ristikivi (1912–1977) was born in Pärnamaa village which is now part of Kilgi village.
