= Foreign relations of Estonia =

The Republic of Estonia gained its independence from the Russian Empire on 24 February 1918 and established diplomatic relations with many countries via membership of the League of Nations. The forcible incorporation of Estonia into the Soviet Union in 1940 was not generally recognised by the international community and the Estonian diplomatic service continued to operate in some countries. Following the restoration of independence from the Soviet Union, Russia was one of the first nations to re-recognize Estonia's independence (the first country to do so was Iceland on 22 August 1991). Estonia's immediate priority after regaining its independence was the withdrawal of Russian (formerly Soviet) forces from Estonian territory. In August 1994, this was completed. However, relations with Moscow have remained strained primarily because Russia decided not to ratify the border treaty it had signed with Estonia in 1999.

== Trends following re-independence ==
Since regaining independence, Estonia has pursued a foreign policy of close cooperation with Western European nations.

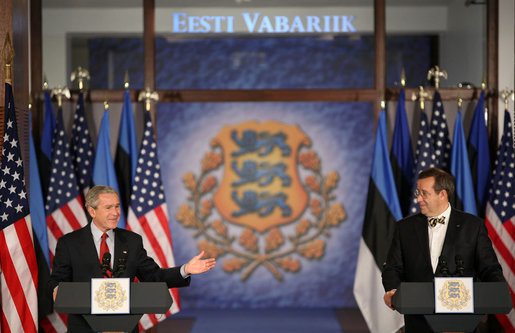
President Toomas Hendrik Ilves and President George W. Bush, in Estonia 2006.

The two most important policy objectives in this regard have been accession into NATO and the European Union, achieved in March and May 2004 respectively. Estonia's international realignment toward the West has been accompanied by a general deterioration in relations with Russia, most recently demonstrated by the controversy surrounding relocation of the Bronze Soldier WWII memorial in Tallinn. Estonia has become an increasingly strong supporter of deepening European integration. The decision to participate in the preparation of a financial transaction tax in 2012 reflects this shift in Estonia's EU policy.

An important element in Estonia's post-independence reorientation has been closer ties with the Nordic countries, especially Finland and Sweden. Indeed, Estonians consider themselves a Nordic people due to being Finnic people like the Finns rather than Balts, based on their historical ties with Denmark and particularly Finland and Sweden. In December 1999 Estonian foreign minister (and since 2006, president of Estonia) Toomas Hendrik Ilves delivered a speech titled "Estonia as a Nordic Country" to the Swedish Institute for International Affairs. In 2003, the foreign ministry also hosted an exhibit called "Estonia: Nordic with a Twist". And in 2005, Estonia joined the European Union's Nordic Battle Group. It has also shown continued interest in becoming a full member in the Nordic Council.

Whereas in 1992 Russia accounted for 92% of Estonia's international trade, today there is extensive economic interdependence between Estonia and its Nordic neighbors: three-quarters of foreign investment in Estonia originates in the Nordic countries (principally Finland and Sweden), to which Estonia sends 42% of its exports (as compared to 6.5% going to Russia, 8.8% to Latvia, and 4.7% to Lithuania). On the other hand, the Estonian political system, its flat rate of income tax, and its non-welfare-state model distinguish it from the other Nordic states, and indeed from many other European countries.

Estonia is a party to 181 international organizations, including the BIS, CBSS, CE, EAPC, EBRD, ECE, EU (member since 1 May 2004), FAO, IAEA, IBRD, ICAO, ICRM, IFC, IFRCS, IHO, ILO, IMF, International Maritime Organization, Interpol, IOC, IOM (observer), ISO (correspondent), ITU, ITUC, NATO, OPCW, OSCE, PFP, UN, UNCTAD, UNESCO, UNMIBH, UNMIK, UNTSO, UPU, WCO, WEU (associate partner), WHO, WIPO, WMO, WTO.

== International disputes ==
=== Territorial issues between Estonia and Russia ===
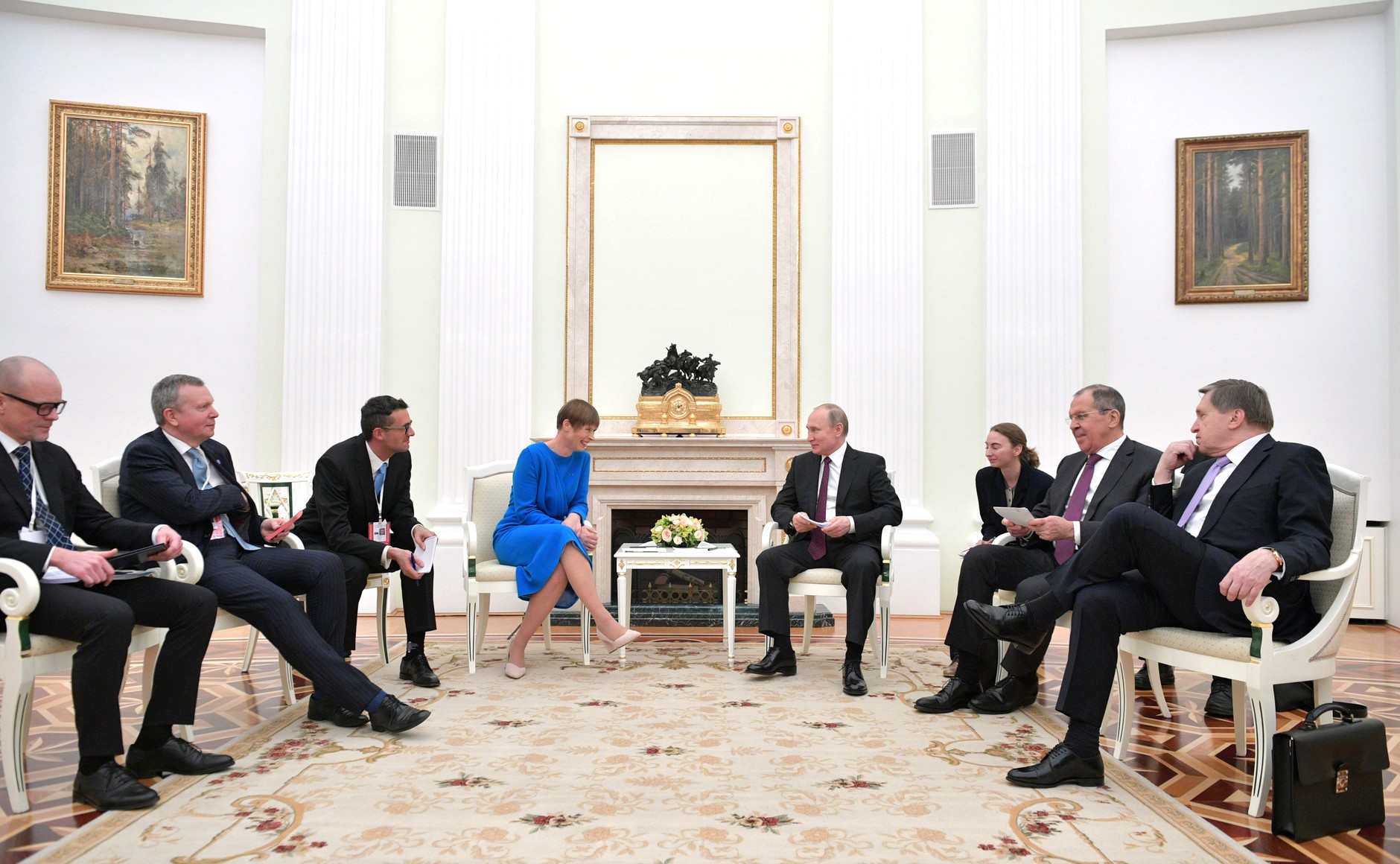
Estonian President Kersti Kaljulaid with Russian President Vladimir Putin in Moscow on 18 April 2019

After the dissolution of the Soviet Union Estonia had hoped for the return of more than 2,000 square kilometers of territory annexed to Russia after World War II in 1945. The annexed land had been within the borders Estonia approved by Russia in the 1920 Tartu Peace Treaty. However, the Boris Yeltsin government disavowed any responsibility for acts committed by the Soviet Union.

After signing the border treaty by the corresponding foreign minister in 2005, it was ratified by the Estonian government and president. The Russian side interpreted the preamble as giving Estonia a possibility for future territorial claim, and Vladimir Putin notified Estonia that Russia will not consider these. Negotiations were reopened in 2012 and the Treaty was signed in February 2014. Ratification is still pending.

== Diplomatic relations ==
List of countries which Estonia maintains diplomatic relations with:

#	Country	Date
1	Denmark	24 August 1991
2	Iceland	26 August 1991
3	Norway	27 August 1991
4	Germany	28 August 1991
5	Sweden	28 August 1991
6	Finland	29 August 1991
7	Luxembourg	29 August 1991
8	France	30 August 1991
9	Italy	31 August 1991
10	Hungary	2 September 1991
11	Poland	2 September 1991
12	Canada	4 September 1991
13	Liechtenstein	4 September 1991
14	Switzerland	4 September 1991
15	United States	4 September 1991
16	Belgium	5 September 1991
17	United Kingdom	5 September 1991
18	Latvia	6 September 1991
19	Czech Republic	9 September 1991
20	Bulgaria	10 September 1991
21	Ireland	10 September 1991
22	China	11 September 1991
23	Romania	13 September 1991
24	Mauritania	18 September 1991
25	Argentina	27 September 1991
26	Chile	27 September 1991
27	Cape Verde	1 October 1991
28	Portugal	1 October 1991
29	Greece	2 October 1991
—	Holy See	3 October 1991
30	Lithuania	5 October 1991
31	Spain	9 October 1991
32	Japan	10 October 1991
33	South Korea	17 October 1991
34	Netherlands	21 October 1991
35	Turkey	23 October 1991
36	Russia	24 October 1991
37	South Africa	4 November 1991
38	Cuba	12 November 1991
39	Mongolia	20 November 1991
40	Australia	21 November 1991
41	India	2 December 1991
42	Mexico	5 December 1991
43	Slovenia	11 December 1991
44	Brazil	16 December 1991
45	Philippines	19 December 1991
46	Albania	1 January 1992
47	Malta	1 January 1992
48	Egypt	2 January 1992
49	Ukraine	4 January 1992
50	New Zealand	6 January 1992
51	Austria	8 January 1992
52	Israel	9 January 1992
53	Cyprus	22 January 1992
54	Ghana	5 February 1992
55	Guinea	10 February 1992
56	Malaysia	11 February 1992
57	Vietnam	20 February 1992
58	Croatia	2 March 1992
59	Senegal	3 April 1992
60	Belarus	6 April 1992
61	Madagascar	13 April 1992
62	Azerbaijan	20 April 1992
63	Nepal	20 April 1992
64	Thailand	27 April 1992
65	Kazakhstan	27 May 1992
66	Georgia	17 June 1992
67	Morocco	22 June 1992
68	Tunisia	29 June 1992
69	Zimbabwe	29 June 1992
70	Paraguay	1 July 1992
71	Burundi	30 July 1992
72	Iran	18 August 1992
73	Armenia	23 August 1992
74	Oman	23 September 1992
75	Uruguay	30 September 1992
76	Ecuador	22 October 1992
77	Bangladesh	5 November 1992
78	Moldova	10 November 1992
79	Nigeria	10 November 1992
80	Mali	13 November 1992
81	Singapore	2 February 1993
82	Guatemala	3 February 1993
83	Bosnia and Herzegovina	8 February 1993
84	Slovakia	30 March 1993
85	Syria	19 May 1993
86	Antigua and Barbuda	4 June 1993
87	Indonesia	5 July 1993
88	Pakistan	20 September 1993
89	Costa Rica	4 October 1993
90	Jamaica	15 February 1994
91	Maldives	22 March 1994
92	Colombia	23 March 1994
93	Venezuela	11 July 1994
94	Turkmenistan	26 August 1994
95	Uzbekistan	10 October 1994
96	Kuwait	28 October 1994
97	Panama	13 January 1995
98	North Macedonia	10 March 1995
99	Laos	29 March 1995
100	Peru	27 July 1995
101	Sri Lanka	31 January 1996
102	Andorra	11 April 1996
103	Kyrgyzstan	12 April 1996
104	Tanzania	24 July 1996
105	Angola	10 March 1997
106	Algeria	19 March 1997
107	Qatar	14 April 1997
108	Zambia	15 May 1997
109	Belize	5 May 1999
110	Jordan	24 January 2001
111	Serbia	9 February 2001
112	El Salvador	12 February 2001
113	Gambia	30 May 2001
114	Lebanon	3 September 2001
115	Mauritius	24 October 2001
116	Kenya	31 October 2001
117	Dominican Republic	18 November 2002
118	Honduras	5 February 2003
119	Saudi Arabia	21 March 2003
120	Botswana	3 June 2003
121	San Marino	15 October 2003
122	Nicaragua	5 March 2004
123	Bolivia	10 March 2004
124	Bahrain	27 April 2004
125	Namibia	26 May 2004
126	Iraq	22 April 2005
127	Eritrea	31 May 2005
128	Djibouti	16 June 2005
129	Suriname	21 June 2005
130	Benin	27 June 2005
131	Afghanistan	1 July 2005
132	Ethiopia	23 August 2005
133	Cambodia	31 August 2005
134	Niger	12 October 2005
135	Bahamas	20 October 2005
136	Timor-Leste	21 December 2005
137	Tajikistan	23 February 2006
138	Rwanda	14 March 2006
139	Burkina Faso	28 March 2006
140	United Arab Emirates	28 March 2006
141	Republic of the Congo	26 April 2006
142	Brunei	1 May 2006
143	Grenada	12 May 2006
144	Montenegro	13 June 2006
145	Cameroon	27 July 2006
146	Uganda	19 September 2006
147	Federated States of Micronesia	22 September 2006
148	Saint Vincent and the Grenadines	13 October 2006
149	Seychelles	15 November 2006
150	Dominica	13 February 2007
151	Guyana	20 April 2007
152	Liberia	28 June 2007
153	Gabon	13 July 2007
154	Guinea-Bissau	8 December 2007
155	Equatorial Guinea	18 December 2007
156	Monaco	7 February 2008
—	Kosovo	24 April 2008
157	Barbados	15 May 2008
158	Fiji	14 July 2008
159	Libya	17 December 2008
160	Samoa	23 January 2009
161	São Tomé and Príncipe	20 May 2009
162	Saint Kitts and Nevis	23 September 2009
163	Saint Lucia	23 September 2009
164	Mozambique	25 September 2009
165	Haiti	31 March 2010
166	Comoros	30 November 2010
167	Sierra Leone	10 May 2011
168	Somalia	23 May 2011
169	Solomon Islands	25 May 2011
170	Tuvalu	25 May 2011
171	Malawi	19 July 2011
172	Nauru	21 March 2012
173	Trinidad and Tobago	2 April 2012
174	Ivory Coast	8 June 2012
175	Vanuatu	25 September 2012
176	Lesotho	26 September 2012
177	Myanmar	26 September 2012
178	Marshall Islands	12 July 2013
179	Palau	8 November 2013
180	Central African Republic	3 April 2014
181	Kiribati	4 September 2014
182	Togo	23 September 2014
183	Tonga	12 March 2015
184	Papua New Guinea	4 October 2016
185	South Sudan	18 September 2017
186	Sudan	25 January 2018
187	Democratic Republic of the Congo	3 July 2018
—	Cook Islands	25 August 2018
188	Chad	28 September 2018
189	Eswatini	21 November 2018
—	Sovereign Military Order of Malta	11 March 2020

== Bilateral relations ==
=== Multilateral ===
Organization	Formal Relations Began	Notes
European Union		See 2004 enlargement of the European Union Estonia joined the European Union as a full member on 1 May 2004.
NATO		Estonia joined NATO as a full member on 29 March 2004.

=== Africa ===
Country	Formal Relations Began	Notes
Egypt	1937	Egypt first recognized Estonia in 1937 and re-recognized Estonia on 6 September 1991.; Egypt is accredited to Estonia from its embassy in Helsinki, Finland.; Estonia has an embassy in Cairo.; Both countries are full members of the Union for the Mediterranean.; January 2005 – Estonian Minister of Foreign Affairs Kristiina Ojuland's visit to Egypt; November 2005 – Prime Minister of Estonia Andrus Ansip in Barcelona at the Euromed Summit met with Egyptian Prime Minister Ahmed Nazif.; December 2007 – Prime Minister of Estonia Andrus Ansip met with Egyptian Prime Minister Ahmed Nazif in the framework of the EU- African Union Summit in Lisbon.; Estonian Ministry of foreign Affairs about the relation with Egypt; Special Mission of the Republic of Estonia to the Arab Republic of Egypt
Ethiopia	23 August 2005	Estonia has an embassy office in Addis Ababa.; Ethiopia is accredited to Estonia from its embassy in Brussels, Belgium.
Lesotho	2012	Both countries established diplomatic relations in September 2012.: Estonia does not have an accreditation to Lesotho.; Lesotho does not have an accreditation to Estonia.
Morocco	22 June 1992	Estonia is accredited to Morocco from its embassy in Lisbon, Portugal.; Morocco is accredited to Estonia from its embassy in Helsinki, Finland.
South Africa		Estonia does not have an accredited to South Africa.; South Africa is accredited to Estonia from its embassy in Stockholm, Sweden.

=== Americas ===
Country	Formal Relations Began	Notes
Argentina	27 September 1991	Argentina is accredited to Estonia from its embassy in Helsinki, Finland.; Estonia does not have an accreditation to Argentina.
Belize	5 May 1999	Both countries established diplomatic relations on 5 May 1999.; Belize does not have an accreditation to Estonia.; Estonia does not have an accreditation to Belize.
Bolivia	8 September 1992	Bolivia is accredited to Estonia from its embassy in Stockholm, Sweden.; Estonia does not have an accreditation to Bolivia.
Brazil	September 1991	Brazil has an embassy in Tallinn.; Estonia is accredited to Brazil from its Ministry of Foreign Affairs in Tallinn.
Canada	1922	See Canada–Estonia relations: Canada has an embassy office in Tallinn.; Estonia has an embassy in Ottawa.
Chile	22 September 1921	See Chile–Estonia relations Chile first recognized Estonia on 22 September 1921. Chile re-recognised Estonia on 28 August 1991 and diplomatic relations between the two countries were established on 27 September 1991. An agreement on visa-free travel between Estonia and Chile came into force on 2 December 2000. The two countries also have in force a Memorandum on co-operation between the Ministries of Foreign Affairs. Agreements on cultural, tourism, and IT cooperation are being readied. Chile is among Estonia's most important foreign trade partners in South America. In 2006, Estonia and Chile issued the joint Antarctic themed stamp series, designed by Ülle Marks and Jüri Kass, bearing images of the Emperor penguin and the minke whale. The works of Chilean writers Isabel Allende, Pablo Neruda and José Donoso have been translated into Estonian.: Chile is accredited to Estonia from its embassy in Helsinki, Finland and maintains an honorary consulate in Tallinn.; Estonia is accredited to Chile from its Ministry of Foreign Affairs in Tallinn and maintains an honorary consulate in Santiago.
Colombia	22 September 1921	Colombia first recognised Estonia on 22 September 1921 and re-recognised the restored Republic of Estonia on 23 March 1994.; Colombia is accredited to Estonia from its embassy in Warsaw, Poland.; Estonia is accredited to Colombia from its Ministry of Foreign Affairs in Tallinn.; Colombia defines Estonia as a major ally and key player on Colombia's accession into the OECD and ratification of the Colombia-European Union Trade Agreement.
Costa Rica	4 October 1993	Costa Rica does not have an accreditation to Estonia; Estonia does not have an accreditation to Costa Rica.
Cuba	12 November 1991	Cuba is accredited to Estonia from its embassy in Helsinki, Finland.; Estonia does not have an accreditation to Cuba.
El Salvador		El Salvador is accredited to Estonia from its embassy in Stockholm, Sweden.; Estonia does not have an accreditation to El Salvador.
Guyana	19 April 1997	Both countries established diplomatic relations on 19 April 1997.: Estonia does not have an accreditation to Guyana.; Guyana does not have an accreditation to Estonia.
Mexico	28 January 1937	See Estonia–Mexico relations: Estonia and Mexico signed a friendship treaty on 28 January 1937.; Mexico was among those countries that never recognized Estonia's annexation by the Soviet Union. Mexico recognized the restored Republic of Estonia on 5 September 1991, while diplomatic relations were re-established on 5 December 1991.; Estonia is accredited to Mexico from its embassy in Washington, D.C., United States and maintains honorary consulates in Mexico City and in Tampico.; Mexico is accredited to Estonia from its embassy in Helsinki, Finland and maintains an honorary consulate in Tallinn.
Peru		Estonia is accredited to Peru from its Ministry of Foreign Affairs in Tallinn.; Peru is accredited to Estonia from its embassy in Helsinki, Finland and maintains an honorary consulate in Tallinn.
Saint Kitts and Nevis	2009	Both countries established diplomatic relations on 23 September 2009.: Estonia does not have an accreditation to Saint Kitts and Nevis.; Saint Kitts and Nevis does not have an accreditation to Estonia.
United States	22 July 1922	See Estonia–United States relations: Estonia has an embassy in Washington, D.C. and consulates-general in New York City and San Francisco.; United States has an embassy in Tallinn.
Uruguay		Estonia does not have an accreditation to Uruguay.; Uruguay is accredited to Estonia from its embassy in Helsinki, Finland and maintains an honorary consulate in Tallinn.
Venezuela		Estonia does not have an accreditation to Venezuela.; Venezuela is accredited to Estonia from its embassy in Oslo, Norway.

=== Asia ===
Country	Formal Relations Began	Notes
Afghanistan	1 July 2005	Afghanistan is accredited to Estonia from its embassy in Warsaw, Poland.; Estonia is accredited to Afghanistan from its Ministry of Foreign Affairs in Tallinn.
Armenia	23 August 1992	See Armenia–Estonia relations: Armenia is accredited to Estonia from its embassy in Warsaw, Poland and an honorary consulate in Tallinn.; Estonia is accredited to Armenia from its embassy in Tbilisi, Georgia and through an honorary consulate in Yerevan.; There are around 2,000 of Armenian descent living in Estonia.; Both countries are full members of the Council of Europe.; Estonia fully supports Armenia's European integration process.
Azerbaijan	20 April 1992	See Azerbaijan-Estonia relations: Estonia recognized the independence of Azerbaijan on February 20, 1992.; Diplomatic relations between Azerbaijan and Estonia have been established since April 20, 1992.; Azerbaijan has an embassy in Tallinn.; Estonia has an embassy office in Baku.; Both countries are full members of the Council of Europe.
Cambodia	31 August 2005	Cambodia is accredited to Estonia from its embassy in Moscow, Russia.; Estonia does not have an accreditation for Cambodia.
China	11 September 1991	See China–Estonia relations: China has an embassy in Tallinn.; Estonia has an embassy in Beijing.; In June 2020, Estonia openly opposed the Hong Kong national security law
Georgia	17 June 1992	Georgia recognized Estonia on 27 August 1991.; Estonia has an embassy in Tbilisi.; Georgia has an embassy in Tallinn.; Both countries are full members of the Council of Europe.; Estonia is an EU member and Georgia is an EU candidate.; Estonian Ministry of Foreign Affairs about relations with Georgia
India	22 September 1921	See Estonia–India relations: India first recognized Estonia on 22 September 1921 and re-recognized Estonia on 9 September 1991.; Estonia has an embassy in New Delhi.; India is accredited to Estonia from its embassy in Helsinki, Finland and maintains an honorary consulate in Tallinn.
Indonesia	5 July 1993	Estonia is accredited to Indonesia from its embassy in Singapore.; Indonesia is accredited to Estonia from its embassy in Helsinki, Finland.
Iran	22 September 1921	Iran recognized Estonia on 22 September 1921, Iran has never recognised the occupation of Estonia by the Soviet Union and re-recognized Estonia on 10 September 1991. Both countries re-established diplomatic relations on 18 August 1992.; Estonia is accredited to Iran from its embassy in Ankara, Turkey.; Iran is accredited to Estonia from its embassy in Helsinki, Finland.
Iraq	22 April 2005	Estonia is accredited to Iraq from its Ministry of Foreign Affairs in Tallinn.; Iraq is accredited to Estonia from its embassy in Helsinki, Finland.
Israel	9 January 1992	See Estonia–Israel relations: Israel recognized Estonia on 4 September 1991.; Estonia has an embassy in Tel Aviv.; Israel is accredited to Estonia from its embassy in Helsinki, Finland.
Japan	26 January 1921;10 October 1991	See Estonia–Japan relations: Estonia has an embassy in Tokyo.; Japan has an embassy in Tallinn.
Kazakhstan	27 May 1992	Estonia has an embassy in Astana.; Kazakhstan has an embassy in Tallinn.
Kuwait	28 October 1994	Estonia is accredited to Kuwait from its embassy in Abu Dhabi, UAE.; Kuwait is accredited to Estonia from its embassy in Berlin, Germany.
Kyrgyzstan	1996	Both countries established diplomatic relations in 1996.; Estonia is accredited to Kyrgyzstan from its embassy in Astana, Kazakhstan.; Kyrgyzstan is accredited to Estonia from its embassy in Minsk, Belarus.; Both countries are full members of the Organization for Security and Co-operation in Europe.
Malaysia	4 November 1993	Malaysia recognised the independence of Estonia on 11 September 1991 shortly after the dissolution of the Estonian Soviet Socialist Republic on 20 August 1991. Relations between the two countries have been established since 4 November 1993.; Estonia is accredited to Malaysia from its embassy in New Delhi, India and maintains an honorary consul in Kuala Lumpur.; Malaysia is accredited to Estonia from its embassy Helsinki, Finland.
Mongolia	20 October 1991	Estonia is accredited to Mongolia from its embassy in Beijing, China and maintains an honorary consulate in Ulaanbaatar.; Mongolia is accredited to Estonia from its embassy in Stockholm, Sweden.
North Korea	—N/a	Neither of the nations have established diplomatic relations.; Estonia only recognized Republic of Korea as the sole legitimate regime in the Korean Peninsula, excluding North Korea.
Oman	23 September 1992	Estonia is accredited to Oman from its embassy in Cairo, Egypt.; Oman is accredited to Estonia from its embassy in London, United Kingdom
Pakistan	20 September 1993	Estonia does not have an accreditation to Pakistan.; Pakistan is accredited to Estonia from its embassy in Warsaw, Poland.
Philippines	19 December 1991	Estonia is accredited to the Philippines from its embassy in Tokyo, Japan, and maintains an honorary consul in Manila.; The Philippines is accredited to Estonia from its embassy in Helsinki, Finland.
Saudi Arabia	21 March 2003	Estonia is accredited to Saudi Arabia from its embassy in Abu Dhabi, the United Arab Emirates.; Saudi Arabia is accredited to Estonia from its embassy in Helsinki, Finland.
South Korea	17 September 1991	See Estonia–South Korea relations The establishment of diplomatic relations between Estonia and the Republic of Korea began on 1991-09-17.: Estonia has an embassy in Seoul.; South Korea is accredited to Estonia from its embassy in Helsinki, Finland.; Estonia recognized South Korea as the sole legitimate regime in the Korean Peninsula.
Sri Lanka	31 January 1996	See Estonia–Sri Lanka relations: Sri Lanka recognized Estonia on 10 October 1991.; Estonia is accredited to Sri Lanka from its embassy in New Delhi, India.; Sri Lanka is accredited to Estonia from its embassy in Stockholm, Sweden.
Syria	19 May 1993	See Estonia–Syria relations: Syria recognized Estonia on 19 May 1993.; Syria has a non-resident ambassador in Minsk.
Taiwan		See Estonia–Taiwan relations: Despite the absence of official diplomatic relations, both countries maintain informal relations.; The Taipei Mission in the Republic of Latvia represents Taiwanese interests in Estonia.
Tajikistan	2006	Both countries established diplomatic relations in 2006.; Estonia is accredited to Tajikistan from its embassy in Astana, Kazakhstan.; Tajikistan is accredited to Estonia from its embassy in Minsk, Belarus.; Both countries are full members of the Organization for Security and Co-operation in Europe.
Thailand	22 October 1921	Thailand (then Siam) first recognized Estonia on 22 October 1921. Both countries re-established diplomatic relations on 27 April 1992.; Estonia is accredited to Thailand through its embassy in Beijing, China.; Thailand is accredited to Estonia through its embassy in Helsinki, Finland.
Turkey	23 October 1991	See Estonia–Turkey relations: Turkey recognized Estonia on 23 October 1991.; Estonia has an embassy in Ankara.; Turkey has an embassy in Tallinn.; Both countries are full members of the NATO.; Estonia is an EU member and Turkey is an EU candidate. Estonia supports Turkey's accession negotiations to the EU, although negotiations have now been suspended.
Turkmenistan	26 August 1994	Estonia is accredited to Turkmenistan from its embassy in Astana, Kazakhstan.; Turkmenistan is accredited to Estonia from its embassy in Minsk, Belarus.
United Arab Emirates	28 March 2006	Estonia has an embassy in Abu Dhabi.; UAE is accredited to Estonia from its embassy in Stockholm, Sweden.
Uzbekistan	10 October 1994	Estonia is accredited to Uzbekistan from its embassy in Astana, Kazakhstan.; Uzbekistan is accredited to Estonia from its embassy in Riga, Latvia.
Vietnam		Estonia is accredited to Vietnam from its embassy in Beijing, China.; Vietnam is accredited to Estonia from its embassy in Helsinki, Finland.

=== Europe ===
Country	Formal Relations Began	Notes
Albania	1 January 1992	See Albania–Estonia relations: Albania is accredited to Estonia from its embassy in Warsaw, Poland.; Estonia is accredited to Albania from its embassy in Athens, Greece.
Austria	26 June 1921	Austria recognised Estonia on 26 June 1921.; Both countries re-established diplomatic relations on 8 January 1992.; Austria has an embassy in Tallinn.; Estonia has an embassy in Vienna.; Both countries are full members of the European Union.
Belarus	6 April 1992	See Belarus-Estonia relations: Belarus has an embassy in Tallinn.; Estonia has an embassy in Minsk.
Belgium	26 January 1921	Belgium is accredited to Estonia from its embassy in Helsinki, Finland.; Estonia has an embassy in Brussels.; Both countries are full members of the European Union and NATO.
Bosnia and Herzegovina	8 February 1993	Bosnia is accredited to Estonia from its embassy in Stockholm, Sweden.; Estonia is accredited to Bosnia from its embassy in Budapest, Hungary.
Bulgaria	20 May 1921	See Bulgaria–Estonia relations: Bulgaria recognised Estonia on 20 May 1921 and re-recognised Estonia on 26 August 1991.; Bulgaria is accredited to Estonia from its embassy in Helsinki, Finland and maintains an honorary consulate in Tallinn.; Estonia is accredited to Bulgaria from its embassy in Bucharest, Romania and has an honorary consulate in Sofia.; Both countries are full members of the European Union and NATO.
Croatia	2 March 1992	See Croatia–Estonia relations: Croatia is accredited to Estonia from its embassy in Helsinki, Finland.; Estonia is accredited to Croatia from its embassy in Prague, Czech Republic.; Both countries are full members of the European Union and NATO.; In 2000 the two countries mutually ended the visa regimes for citizens travelling between the two states. In September 2008, the Estonian prime minister Andrus Ansip made a state visit to Croatia in which he supported the country on its way toward NATO and EU membership.
Cyprus	22 January 1992	Cyprus is accredited to Estonia from its embassy in Helsinki, Finland.; Estonia is accredited to Cyprus from its embassy in Athens, Greece.; Both countries are full members of the European Union.
Czech Republic	9 September 1991	Czech Republic has an embassy in Tallinn.; Estonia has an embassy in Prague.; Both countries are full members of the European Union and NATO.
Denmark	1921	See Denmark–Estonia relations: Denmark has an embassy in Tallinn.; Estonia has an embassy in Copenhagen.; Both countries are full members of the European Union and NATO.
Finland	20 June 1920	See Estonia–Finland relations: Finland first recognised Estonia on 20 June 1920.; Finland has an embassy in Tallinn and an honorary consulate in Tartu.; Estonia has an embassy in Helsinki and six honorary consulates in Kotka, Mariehamn, Oulu, Tampere, Turku and Vaasa.; Both countries are full members of the Council of the Baltic Sea States and of the European Union and of NATO.; Estonia and Finland have a joint embassy in Canberra.; Estonia fully supported Finland's application to join NATO, which resulted in membership on 4 April 2023.
France	26 January 1921	See Estonia–France relations: France recognised Estonia on 26 January 1921. France never recognised the Soviet occupation of Estonia. France re-stated its recognition on 25 August 1991.; Estonia has an embassy in Paris and 4 honorary consulates (in Lille, Lyon, Nancy and Toulouse).; France has its French Institute of Estonia in Tallinn.; Both countries are full members of the European Union and NATO.
Germany	28 August 1991	See Estonia–Germany relations: Estonia has an embassy in Berlin.; Germany has an embassy in Tallinn.; Both countries are full members of the European Union and NATO.
Greece	19 May 1922	See Estonia–Greece relations: Greece recognised Estonia on 19 May 1922. Greece never recognised the Soviet annexation of Estonia.; Estonia has an embassy in Athens.; Greece has an embassy in Tallinn.; Both countries are full members of NATO and the European Union.; Estonian Ministry of Foreign Affairs about relations with Greece; Greek Foreign Affairs Ministry about relations with Estonia
Holy See	10 October 1921	Estonia is accredited to the Holy See from its Ministry of Foreign Affairs in Tallinn.; Holy See is accredited to Estonia from its Apostolic Nunciature in Vilnius, Lithuania.; In September 1993, Pope John Paul II visited Estonia.; Estonian Ministry of Foreign Affairs about the bilateral relations with the Vatican
Hungary	24 February 1921	See Estonia–Hungary relations: Hungary recognised Estonia on 24 February 1921.; Estonia has an embassy in Budapest.; Hungary has an embassy in Tallinn.; Both countries are full members of NATO and of the European Union.; Estonia Ministry of Foreign affairs about relations with Hungary
Iceland	30 January 1922	See Estonia–Iceland relations: Iceland was the first country to re-recognized Estonia's independence on 22 August 1991.; Estonia is accredited to Iceland through its embassy in Oslo, Norway and maintains an honorary consulate in Reykjavík.; Iceland is accredited to Estonia from its embassy in Helsinki, Finland.; Both countries are full members of NATO, of the Council of Europe and of the Council of the Baltic Sea States.; Estonia and Iceland have a joint embassy in Beijing, China.
Ireland	27 August 1991	Ireland recognised Estonia on 27 August 1991.; Estonia has an embassy in Dublin.; Ireland has an embassy in Tallinn.; Both countries are full members of the European Union.
Italy	26 January 1921	See Estonia–Italy relations: Italy recognised Estonia on 26 January 1921. Italy re-recognised Estonia on 27 August 1991.; Estonia has an embassy in Rome.; Italy has an embassy in Tallinn.; Both countries are full members of NATO and of the European Union.
Kosovo	24 April 2008	See Estonia–Kosovo relations: Estonia recognized Kosovo on 21 February 2008.; Estonia is accredited to Kosovo from its embassy in Vienna, Austria.; Kosovo is accredited to Estonia from its embassy in Stockholm, Sweden.
Latvia	3 December 1918	See Estonia–Latvia relations: Estonia has an embassy in Riga.; Latvia has an embassy in Tallinn.; The two states share 343 km of common borders.; They enjoy close relations sharing a common history of relations in the USSR and being neighbours.
Lithuania	1919	See Estonia–Lithuania relations: Estonia has an embassy in Vilnius.; Lithuania has an embassy in Tallinn.; Until 31 July 2016 the Estonian ambassador to Lithuania was Toomas Kukk.; Both countries are situated in the Baltic region and are the full members of NATO and EU.
Luxembourg	22 February 1923	Luxembourg recognized Estonia on 22 February 1923 and re-recognised Estonia on 27 August 1991. Both countries re-established diplomatic relations on 29 August 1991.; Estonia is accredited to Luxembourg from its embassy in Brussels, Belgium and maintains an honorary consulate in Luxembourg City.; Trade agreement between Estonia and Belgium and Luxembourg (1935); Agreement on Road Transport between Estonia, Latvia, Lithuania, Belgium, Luxembourg and the Netherlands (came into force 1 December 1994); Agreement Between Estonia and the Belgo-Luxembourg Economic Union on the Reciprocal Promotion and Protection of Investments (came into force 23 September 1999); Agreement Between Estonia and the States of Benelux on Readmission of Persons (came into force 1 February 2005); Agreement on the Avoidance of Double Taxation and the Prevention of Income and Capital Tax evasion (signed 23 May 2006)
Malta	1 January 1992	Malta recognized Estonia on 26 August 1991.; Estonia is accredited to Malta from its embassy in Rome, Italy.; Malta is accredited to Estonia from its Ministry of Foreign Affairs in Valletta.; Malta has an honorary consulate in Tallinn.; Both countries are full members of the European Union.
Moldova		See Estonia–Moldova relations: Moldova recognized Estonia on 28 August 1991 and Estonia recognized Moldova on 20 February 1992.; Estonia haș an embassy office in Chișinău.; Moldova has an embassy in Tallinn.; Both countries are full members of the Council of Europe.; Estonia is an EU member and Moldova is an EU candidate.
Montenegro	13 June 2006	Estonia is accredited to Montenegro from its embassy in Budapest, Hungary.; Montenegro is accredited to Estonia from its embassy in Warsaw, Poland.; Both countries are full members of NATO.; Estonia is an EU member and Montenegro is an EU candidate.
Netherlands	5 March 1921	The Netherlands recognized Estonia on 5 March 1921. After the end of Soviet occupation the Netherlands re-recognised Estonia on 2 September 1991.; Estonia has an embassy in The Hague.; Netherlands has an embassy in Tallinn.; Both countries are full members of NATO and of the European Union.
North Macedonia	2 March 1995	Both countries established diplomatic relations on 2 March 1995.: Estonia is accredited to North Macedonia from its embassy in Budapest, Hungary.; North Macedonia has an embassy in Tallinn.; Both countries are full members of NATO.; Estonia is an EU member and North Macedonia is an EU candidate.
Norway	5 February 1921	Norway recognized Estonia on 5 February 1921. Norway never recognized the annexation of the Baltic States by the Soviet Union.; Estonia has an embassy in Oslo and three honorary consulates (in Trondheim, Tromsø and Stavanger).; Norway has an embassy in Tallinn.; Both countries are full members of the Council of the Baltic Sea States, the Council of Europe and of NATO.
Poland	31 December 1920	See Estonia–Poland relations: Poland recognized Estonia's independence on 31 December 1920 and re-recognized it on 26 August 1991.; Estonia has an embassy in Warsaw and three honorary consulates (in Szczecin, Poznań and Kraków).; Poland has an embassy in Tallinn.; Both countries are full members of the Council of the Baltic Sea States, of NATO and of the European Union.
Portugal	6 February 1921	Portugal recognized Estonia de facto in 1918 and de jure on 6 February 1921. Portugal never recognized the occupation of Estonia by the Soviet Union. Portugal re-recognized Estonia on 27 August 1991.; Estonia has an embassy in Lisbon.; Portugal is accredited to Estonia from its embassy in Helsinki, Finland.; Both countries are full members of NATO and of the European Union.
Romania	26 February 1921	Romania recognized Estonia's independence on 26 February 1921.; Estonia has an embassy in Bucharest.; Romania has an embassy in Tallinn.; Both countries are full members of NATO and of the European Union.
Russia	2 February 1920	See Estonia–Russia relations Russia recognized Estonia via the Tartu Peace Treaty on 2 February 1920. Russian-Estonian relations were re-established in January 1991, when leaders of the two countries, Boris Yeltsin of Russia and Arnold Rüütel of Estonia, met in Tallinn and signed a treaty on the relations of the two countries after the anticipated independence of Estonia from the Soviet Union. The treaty envisaged the right to freely choose their citizenship for all permanent residents of Estonia at the time. Russia re-recognized the Republic of Estonia on 24 August 1991 after the failed Soviet coup attempt, as one of the first countries to do so. The Soviet Union recognised the independence of Estonia on 6 September 1991. Estonia's ties with Boris Yeltsin's government weakened after the Russian president's initial show of solidarity with the Baltic states in January 1991. Issues surrounding the withdrawal of Russian troops from the Baltic countries and Estonia's denial of automatic citizenship to persons who settled in Estonia in 1940–1991 and their offspring ranked high on the list of points of contention.: Estonia has an embassy in Moscow and consulates-general in Pskov and Saint Petersburg.; Russia has an embassy in Tallinn and consulates-general in Narva and Tartu.
Serbia	9 February 2001	Estonia is accredited to Serbia from its embassy in Budapest, Hungary.; Serbia is accredited to Estonia from its embassy in Helsinki, Finland.; Estonia is an EU member and Serbia is an EU candidate.
Slovakia	30 March 1993	See Estonia–Slovakia relations: Estonia recognised Slovakia on 15 January 1993.; Estonia is accredited to Slovakia through its embassy in Vienna, Austria.; Slovakia is accredited to Estonia from its embassy in Helsinki, Finland.; Both countries are full members of NATO and of the European Union.
Slovenia		Estonia is accredited to Slovenia from its embassy in Prague, Czech Republic.; Slovenia is accredited to Estonia from its embassy in Riga, Latvia.; Both countries are full members of NATO and of the European Union.
Spain	25 March 1921	See Estonia–Spain relations: Spain recognized Estonia in 1921. Spain renewed its recognition of Estonia on 27 August 1991.; Estonia has an embassy in Madrid.; Spain has an embassy in Tallinn.; Both countries are full members of NATO and of the European Union.
Sweden		See Estonia–Sweden relations: Estonia was under Swedish rule between 1561 and 1721.; Sweden recognized Estonia on 4 February 1921. Sweden resumed diplomatic relations with Estonia on 28 August 1991.; Estonia has an embassy in Stockholm and five honorary consulates (in Eskilstuna, Gothenburg, Karlskrona, Malmö and Visby).; Sweden has an embassy in Tallinn and two honorary consulates (in Narva and Tartu).; Both countries are full members of the European Union and NATO.; Estonia fully supported Sweden's application to join NATO, which resulted in membership on 7 March 2024.
Switzerland	4 September 1991	Estonia is accredited to Switzerland from its embassy in Vienna, Austria.; Switzerland is accredited to Estonia from its embassy in Riga, Latvia.
Ukraine	4 January 1992	See Estonia–Ukraine relations: Ukraine recognised Estonia on 26 August 1991.; Estonia has an embassy in Kyiv.; Ukraine has an embassy in Tallinn.; Estonia is an EU member and Ukraine is an EU candidate.; The contractual and legal framework of relations between Ukraine and Estonia covers a wide range of branches of bilateral cooperation, including political, trade and economic, scientific and technical, humanitarian, law enforcement and other spheres. This base is ramified and efficient enough and includes 53 bilateral documents, among which are 3 interstate agreements, 15 intergovernmental and 35 interdepartmental. Ukraine and Estonia bring together common aspirations in the political, economic, social and other spheres. Recognizing Ukraine as its foreign policy priority, Estonia is one of the most consistent supporters of Ukraine's European choice, supported the signing of the Agreement on the Association of Ukraine with the EU. Intensive bilateral contacts between state and non-governmental institutions are developing, and interaction within the framework of international organizations is active. At the state level, the important role played by Ukraine in ensuring stability and security in Europe is constantly stressed. Estonia supports political and socio-economic reforms in Ukraine, provides substantial humanitarian, financial and advisory and technical assistance.
United Kingdom	5 February 1921	See Estonia–United Kingdom relations Estonia re-established diplomatic relations with the United Kingdom on 5 September 1991.: Estonia maintains an embassy in London.; The United Kingdom is accredited to Estonia through its embassy in Tallinn.; Both countries share common membership of the Council of Europe, European Court of Human Rights, the International Criminal Court, Joint Expeditionary Force, NATO, OECD, OSCE, and the World Trade Organization. Bilaterally the two countries have a Defence Cooperation Agreement, and a Double Taxation Agreement.

=== Oceania ===
Country	Formal Relations Began	Notes
Australia	22 September 1921	See Australia–Estonia relations: Australia first recognised Estonia on 22 September 1921.; Both countries re-established diplomatic relations on 21 November 1991.; Australia is accredited to Estonia through a part-time (pop-up) embassy in Tallinn since 2018.; Estonia has an embassy in Canberra.; Australia is host to one of the largest communities of Estonians abroad, with 8,232 people identifying as Estonian in the 2006 Australian Census.
New Zealand	6 January 1992	See Estonia–New Zealand relations: Estonia is accredited to New Zealand from its embassy in Canberra, Australia.; New Zealand is accredited to Estonia from its embassy in Warsaw, Poland.
Samoa	2009	Both countries established diplomatic relations on 23 January 2009.: Estonia does not have an accreditation to Samoa.; Samoa does not have an accreditation to Estonia.
Tonga	13 March 2015	Both countries established diplomatic relations on 13 March 2015.; Estonia does not have an accreditation to Tonga.; Tonga does not have an accreditation to Estonia.

== See also ==
- List of diplomatic missions in Estonia
- List of diplomatic missions of Estonia
- List of ambassadors to Estonia
- List of envoys of Estonia
- Visa requirements for Estonian citizens
