= Celia Kuningas-Saagpakk =

Estonian diplomat

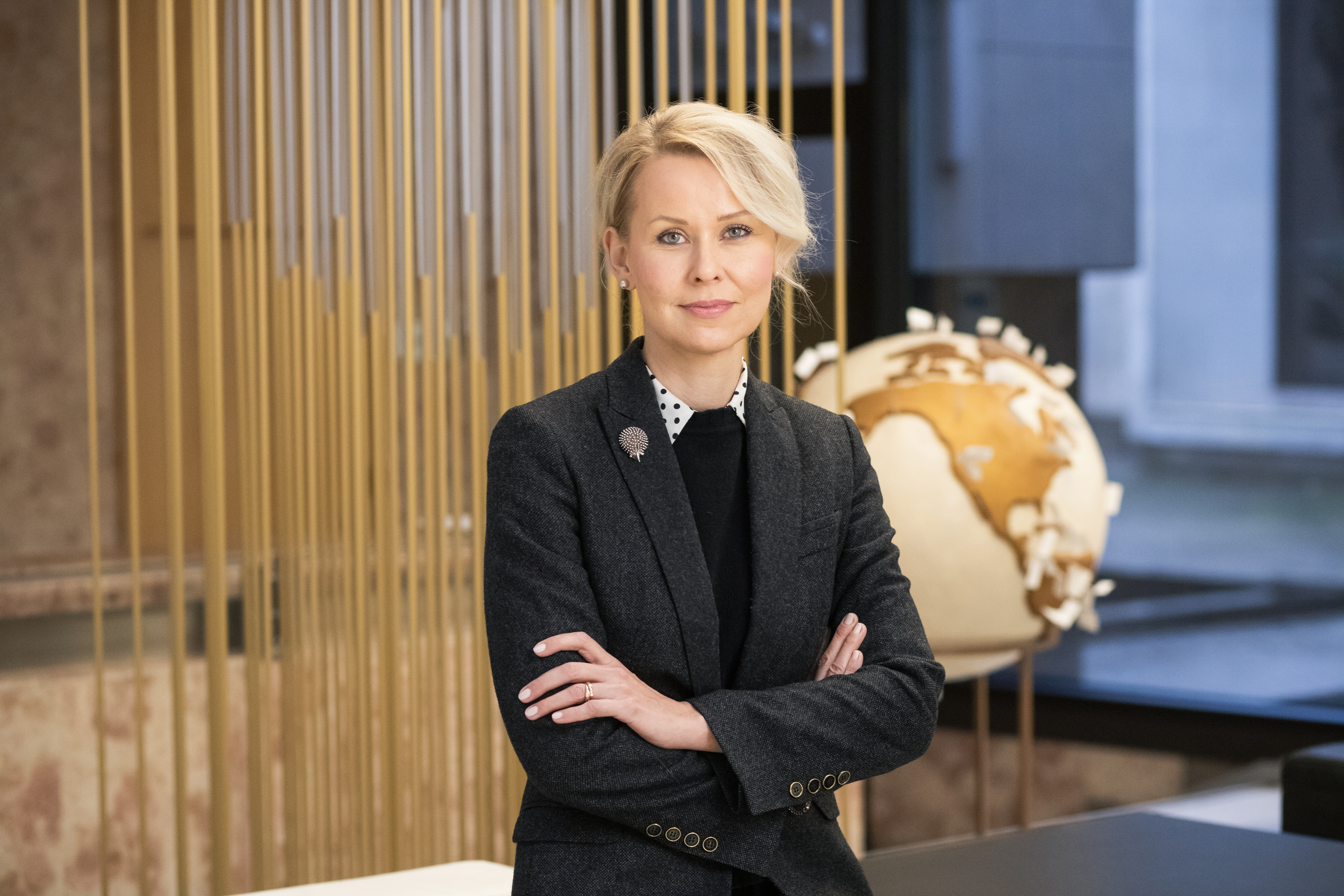

Estonian ambassador to the Holy See
- Incumbent
- Assumed office 4 December 2020

Estonian ambassador to Italy, Malta, and San Marino
- In office 2014–2021

Personal details
- Born: Celia Kuningas; 1975 (age 50–51)

Celia Kuningas-Saagpakk (née Kuningas, born in 1975) is an Estonian female diplomat. Between 2014 and 2020, she served as the Estonian ambassador to Italy, Malta, and San Marino. On 4 December 2020, she was sworn in as Estonian ambassador to the Holy See.
