= Estonia–Syria relations =

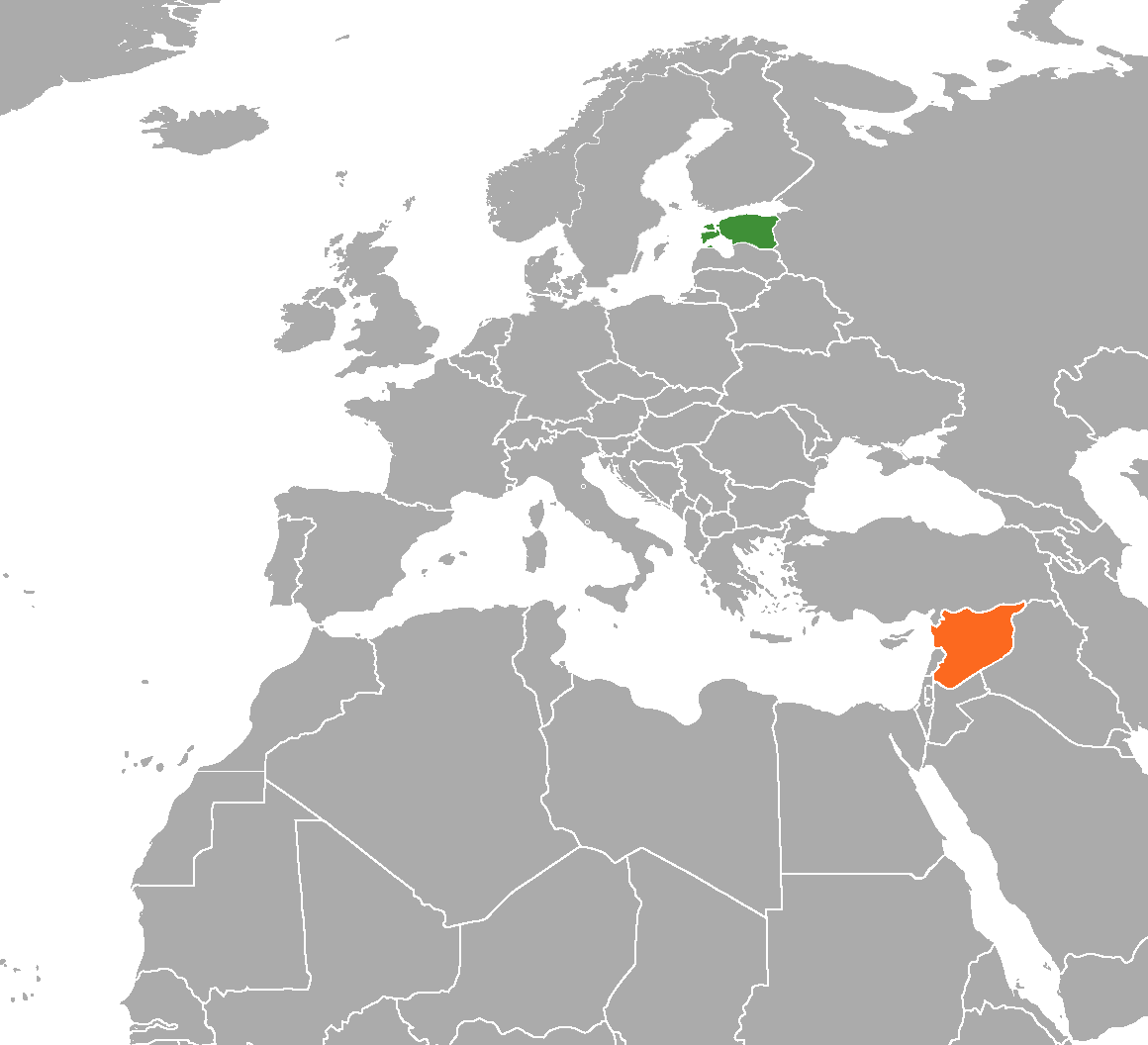
- Estonia: Syria

Estonia–Syria relations are the bilateral relations between Estonia and Syria. Both countries established diplomatic relations on 1993. Neither country has a resident ambassador. Syria has a non resident ambassador in Minsk.

== History ==
The history of the bilateral relations between both countries originated when Estonia re-declared independence from the Soviet Union. (Note: Declared independence in 1918 and re-integrated with the Soviets in 1945.) The two countries established diplomatic relations on 19 May 1993.

=== Syrian civil war ===
Beginning in 2016, more than 200 refugees from Syria displaced by the Syrian civil war were granted asylum by Estonia. While the refugees and their descendants were there, they developed strong ties with Estonian locals.

==== Estonian Aid to Syria ====
On 30 March 2021, Estonian foreign minister Eva-Maria Liimets announced that Estonia would be allocating €1.3 Million to the humanitarian crisis in the Syrian civil war. Additionally, they gave 100,000 euros of aid to alleviate the humanitarian situation.

=== Post-Assad relations ===
In December 2024, there were 72 Syrian citizens in Estonia with valid international protection status. Estonian Foreign Minister Margus Tsahkna said that Estonia does not plan to extend temporary protection for Syrian war refugees. In 2025, Estonia protected remaining refugees who have not yet returned to Syria. They would be protected until they return to Syria.

== See also ==
- Foreign relations of Estonia
- Foreign relations of Syria
