= Bulgaria–Estonia relations =

Bilateral relations of Bulgaria and Estonia

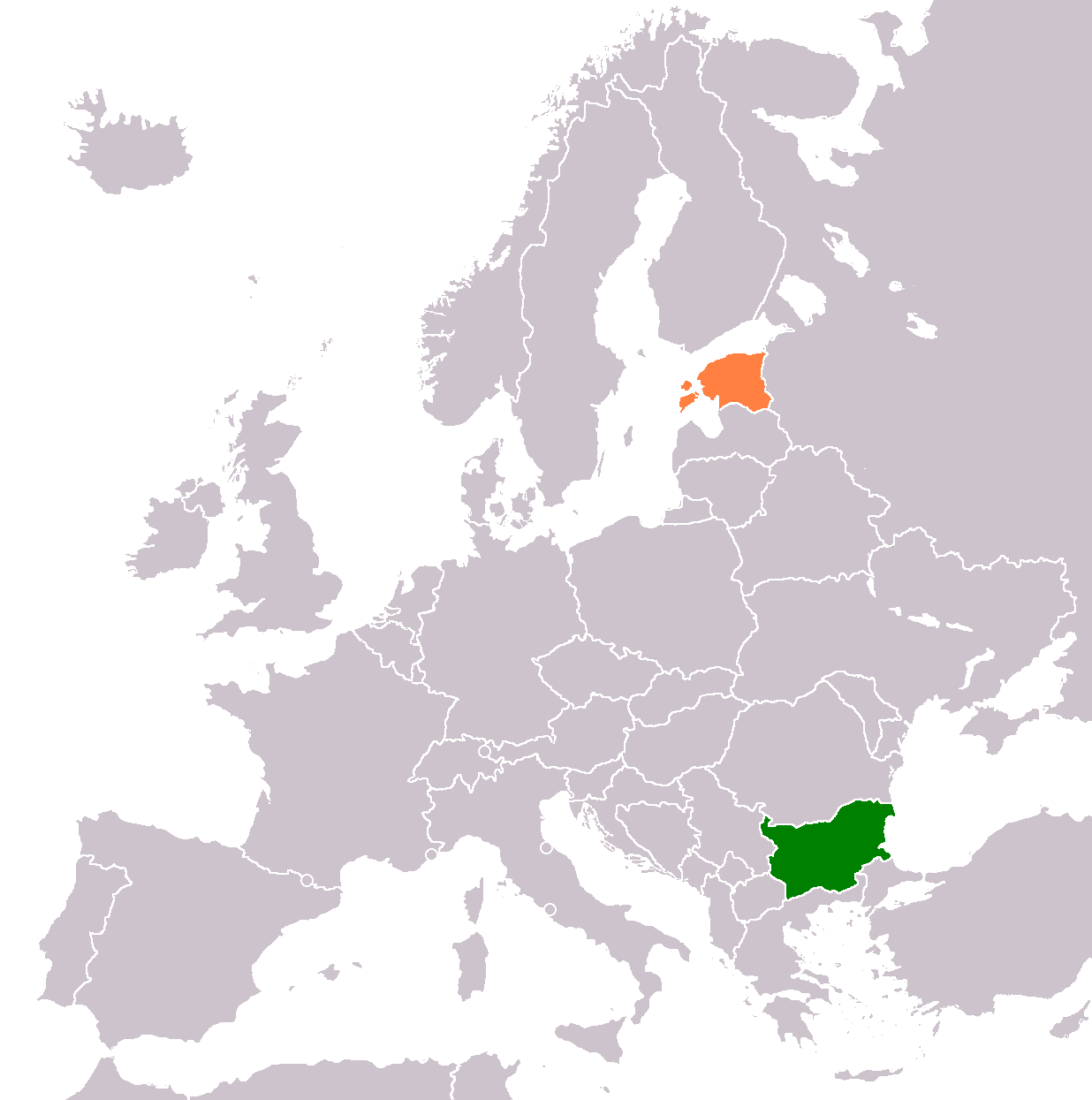

- Bulgaria: Estonia

Bulgaria–Estonia relations are the bilateral relations between Bulgaria and Estonia. Bulgaria recognised Estonia on May 20, 1922 and re-recognised Estonia on August 26, 1991. Both countries restored diplomatic relations on September 10, 1991. Both countries are members of the Council of Europe, the European Union and NATO.

Both countries became members of NATO in 2004.

== Diplomatic missions ==
Bulgaria is represented in Estonia through an honorary consulate in Tallinn. Estonia has an embassy and an honorary consulate in Sofia.

== See also ==
- Foreign relations of Bulgaria
- Foreign relations of Estonia
