= Croatia–Estonia relations =

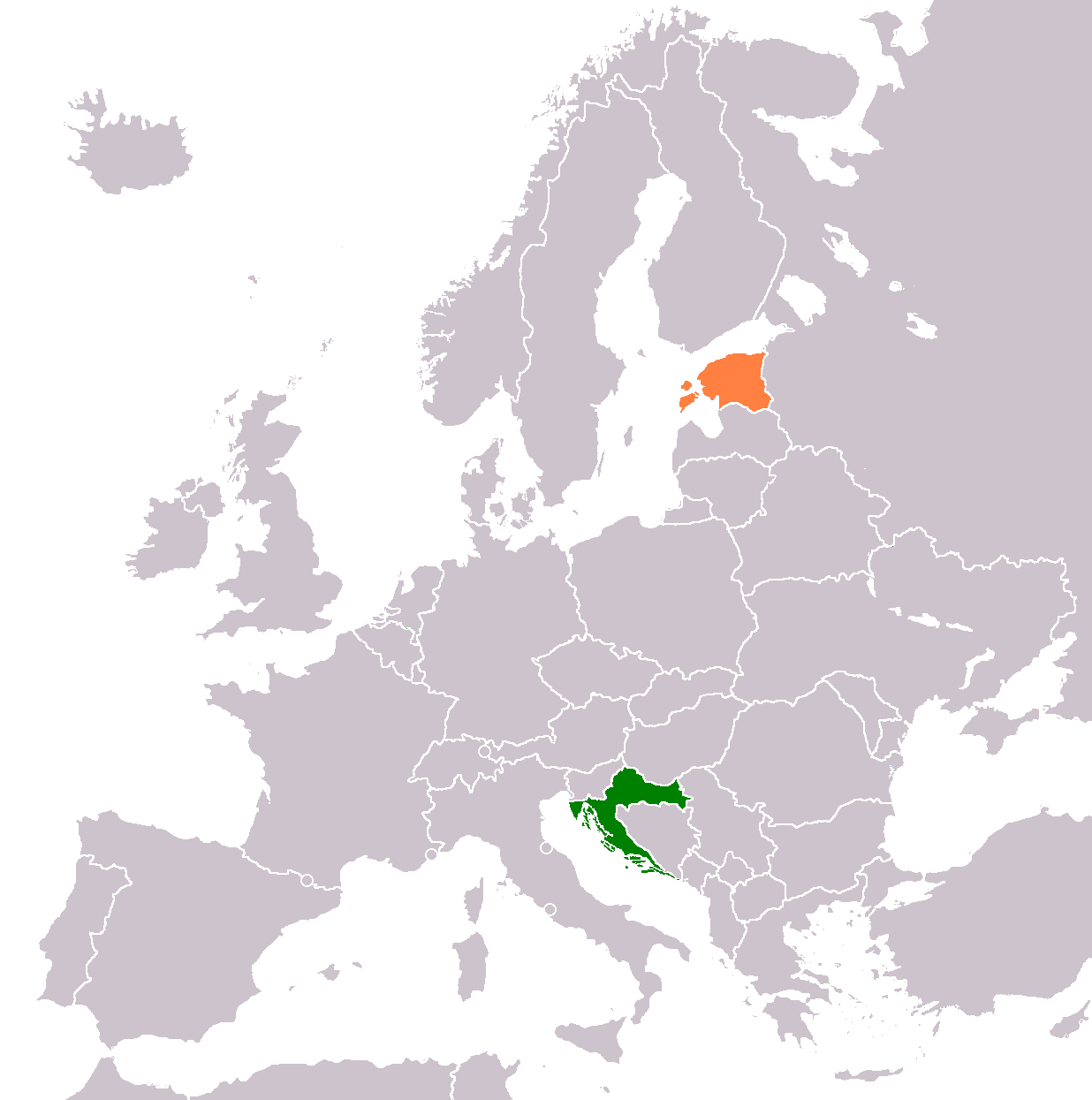

- Croatia: Estonia

Croatia–Estonia relations are the bilateral relations between the nations of Estonia and Croatia. Both countries are members of the Council of Europe, European Union, NATO and the Eurozone.

== History ==
Estonia recognized Croatia on 31 December 1991. Diplomatic relations between the two countries began on 2 March 1992.

Estonia, a member of the European Union since 1 May 2004, supported Croatia's accession to the organization on 1 July 2013, drawing on its own experience. Estonia joined NATO on 29 March 2004, and Croatia on 1 July 2009. As of 2023, both countries are members of the Eurozone and the Schengen area.

In 2015, Croatian exports to Estonia amounted to 1.7 million euros, while Estonian exports to Croatia amounted to 1.4 million euros.

On 14 March 2022, Minister of Foreign and European Affairs Gordan Grlić Radman paid an official visit to Estonia, where he held talks for the first time with his Estonian counterpart Eva-Maria Liimets. They highlighted the potential for bilateral cooperation, particularly in the economy, defence, IT and tourism.

== Visits ==
In 2000 the two countries mutually ended the visa regimes for citizens travelling between the two states. In September 2008, Estonian prime minister Andrus Ansip conducted a state visit to Croatia in which he supported the country on its passage toward NATO and EU membership.

On January 12, 2023, Estonian President Alar Karis met in Tallinn with Croatian Prime Minister Andrej Plenković, discussing bilateral relations and the continued need to support Ukraine in Russia's aggressive war and the possibility of assisting Ukraine.

On the same day, Estonian Prime Minister Kaja Kallas, at a joint press conference with Croatian Prime Minister Andrej Plenković in Tallinn, testified that Estonia and Croatia are like-minded on many issues, including Ukraine and defense and security issues.

== Diplomatic missions ==
- Croatia is accredited to Estonia from its embassy in Helsinki, Finland.
- Estonia is accredited to Croatia from its embassy in Prague, Czech Republic.

== See also ==
- Foreign relations of Croatia
- Foreign relations of Estonia
- NATO-EU relations
