= Estonia–Japan relations =

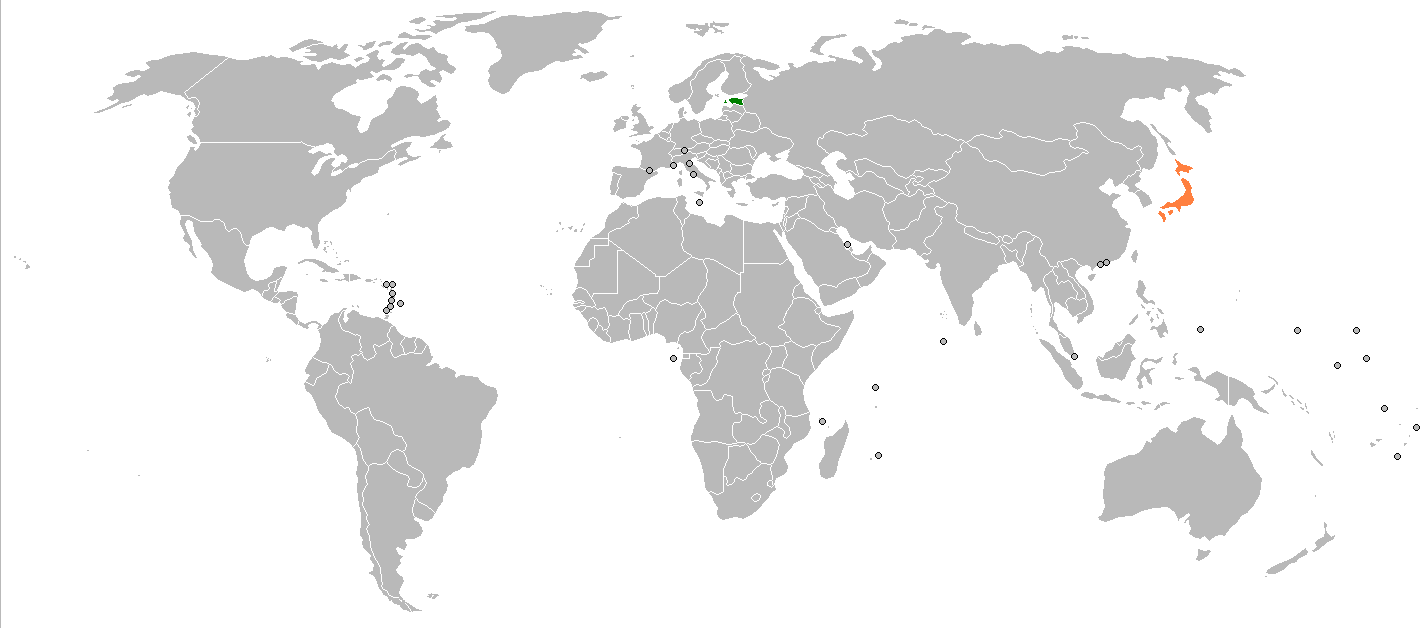
- Estonia: Japan

Estonia–Japan relations are the bilateral relations between Estonia and Japan. Both nations are members of the Organisation for Economic Co-operation and Development. Estonia has an embassy in Tokyo. Japan has an embassy in Tallinn.

== History ==
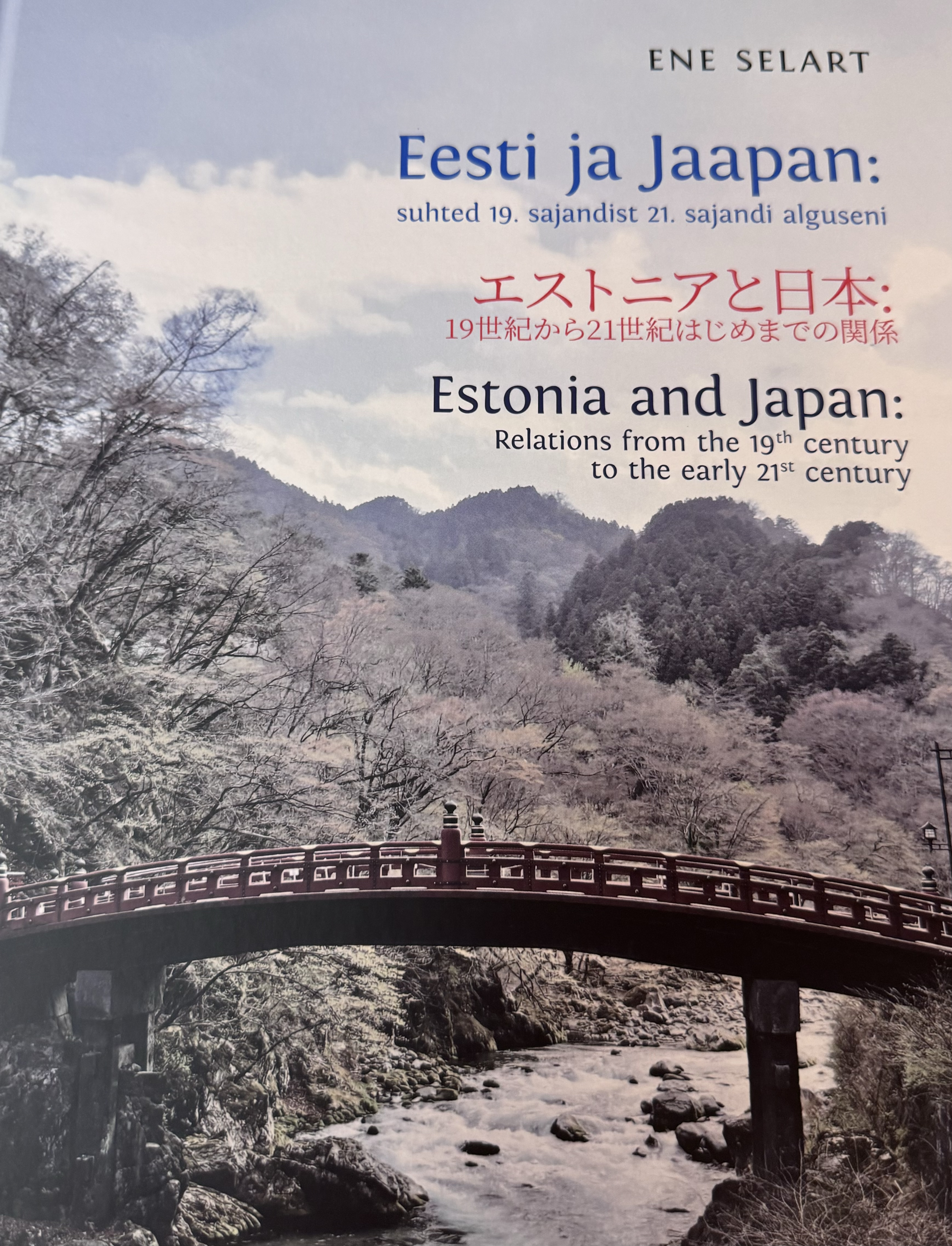
Presentation of a book introducing Estonian-Japanese relations at the Ministry of Foreign Affairs

=== Interwar period ===
Japan recognized the Republic of Estonia on 6 March 1919 de facto and on 26 January 1921 the Entente Supreme Council (including Japan) recognized the Republic of Estonia de iure. On 8 March 1921, Japan also recognized the Republic of Estonia de jure by a separate act. In 1921, a temporary chargé d'affaires was appointed to Riga, who also covered Estonia. In 1937, the Japanese ambassador residing in Riga, Shin Sakuma, was also accredited to Tallinn.

=== Modern relations ===
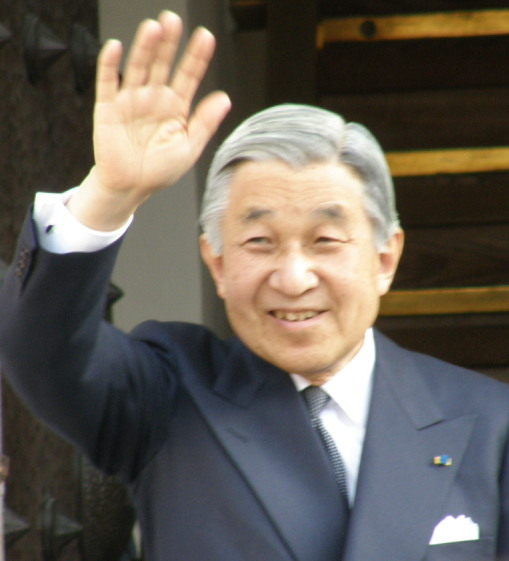
Japanese Emperor Akihito in Tallinn 2007

After the restoration of the Republic of Estonia on 20 August 1991, the Ambassador with special powers sent from Japan delivered an official message from the Japanese government in Tallinn on 6 September 1991 regarding the recognition of the Republic of Estonia. Japan de facto re-recognized Estonia on 6 September 1991, and a month later diplomatic relations were re-established between these countries on 10 October 1991. In January 1993 the Embassy of Japan was established in Tallinn and in September 1996 the Embassy of Estonia was established in Tokyo.

The Estonian-Japanese Association has been operating in Tallinn since 1992.

On May 24–25, 2007, the official visit of Japanese Emperor Akihito and Empress Michiko to Estonia took place.

In January 2010, Ambassador Hoshi Hideaki was appointed as the first permanent ambassador in Estonia.

== High level visits ==
=== High-level visits from Estonia to Japan ===
In October 2004, President Arnold Ruutel travelled to Japan.

In February 2010, Prime Minister Andrus Ansip travelled to Japan.

In April 2016, Prime Minister Taavi Roivas travelled to Japan.

In June 2019, Prime Minister Jüri Ratas travelled to Japan.

In October 2019, Estonian President Kersti Kaljulaid travelled to Tokyo to attend the enthronement of Japanese Emperor Naruhito.

=== High-level visits from Japan to Estonia ===
In May 2007, the Emperor and Empress of Japan, Akihito and Michiko, made an official visit to Estonia.

On 12 January 2018, Japanese Prime Minister Shinzo Abe met with President Kersti Kaljulaid and Prime Minister Jüri Ratas.

== Economic relations ==
Since regaining independence from the Soviet Union, Japan has provided Estonia with economic assistance to promote market economy and democratization. By 2008, the total amount provided was 228 million yen in grant aid and 129 million yen in technical cooperation.. However, Estonia's economy has continued to grow steadily, with its nominal GDP per capita hovering between the high $10,000 and $20,000 range. On December 9, 2010, it became the first of the Baltic states to join the Organization for Economic Cooperation and Development (OECD). Due to these economic conditions, Estonia is often considered a developed country, and Japan ended its economic assistance to Estonia in 2009.

In terms of trade, Estonia's exports to Japan totaled 79.8 million euros, with major items including lumber and log houses, machinery, metals, and optical and precision instruments. Imports to Japan, meanwhile, totaled 46.5 million euros, with major items including machinery, automobiles and parts, and leather goods.

Estonia has launched an "e-residency" system, which opens up some of its convenient administrative services, such as online corporate registration and tax payments, to foreigners.

The system is attracting foreign investment and business expansion. As a result, Japanese companies such as Marubeni have expanded into Estonia. Fujitsu has also set up a service base in Estonia, and the country is attracting attention as a startup hub.

== Cultural relations ==
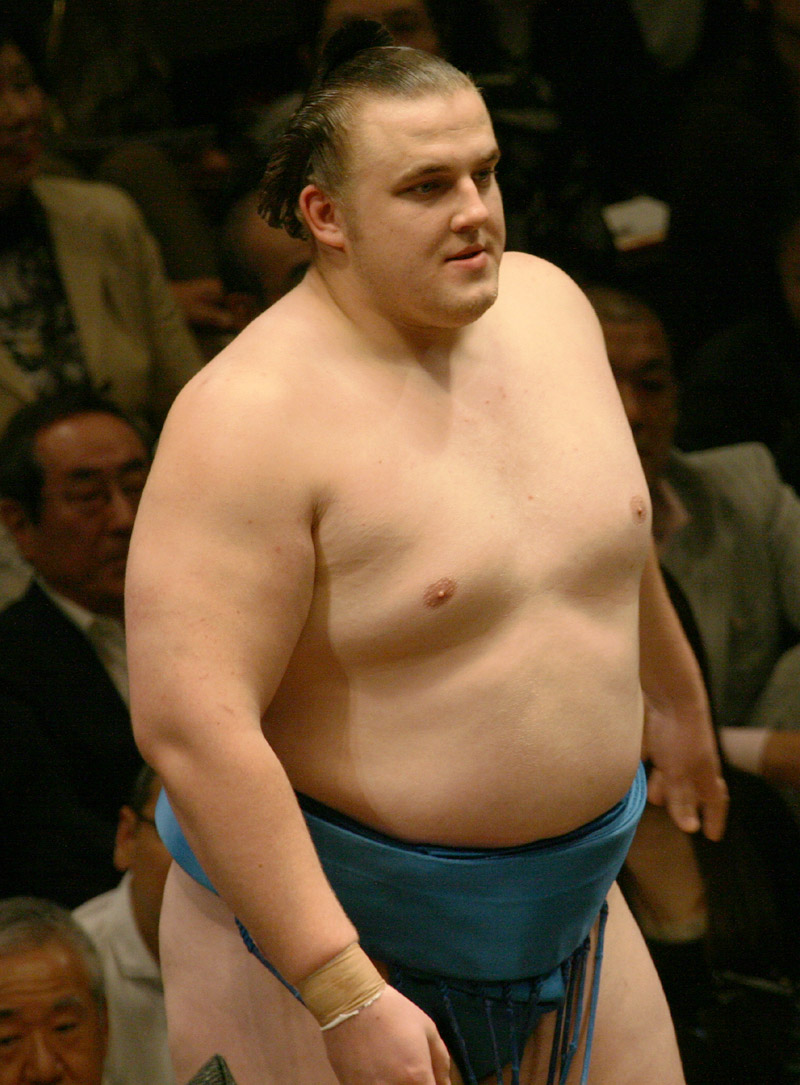
Baruto Kaito in 2008.

Kaido Höövelson, also known as Baruto, is the first Estonian to become a professional sumo wrestler in Japan. Due to a persistent knee injury, he had to give up his sumo career on September 11 2013.

Japanese violinist Mari Adachi performed at the Pärnu music festival weather.

The Estonian Saku and the Japanese Saku have been twin cities since 1 May 2007.

== Resident diplomatic missions ==
- Estonia has an embassy in Tokyo.
- Japan has an embassy in Tallinn.

== See also ==
- Foreign relations of Estonia
- Foreign relations of Japan
