= Estonia–Germany relations =

Bilateral relations of Estonia and Germany

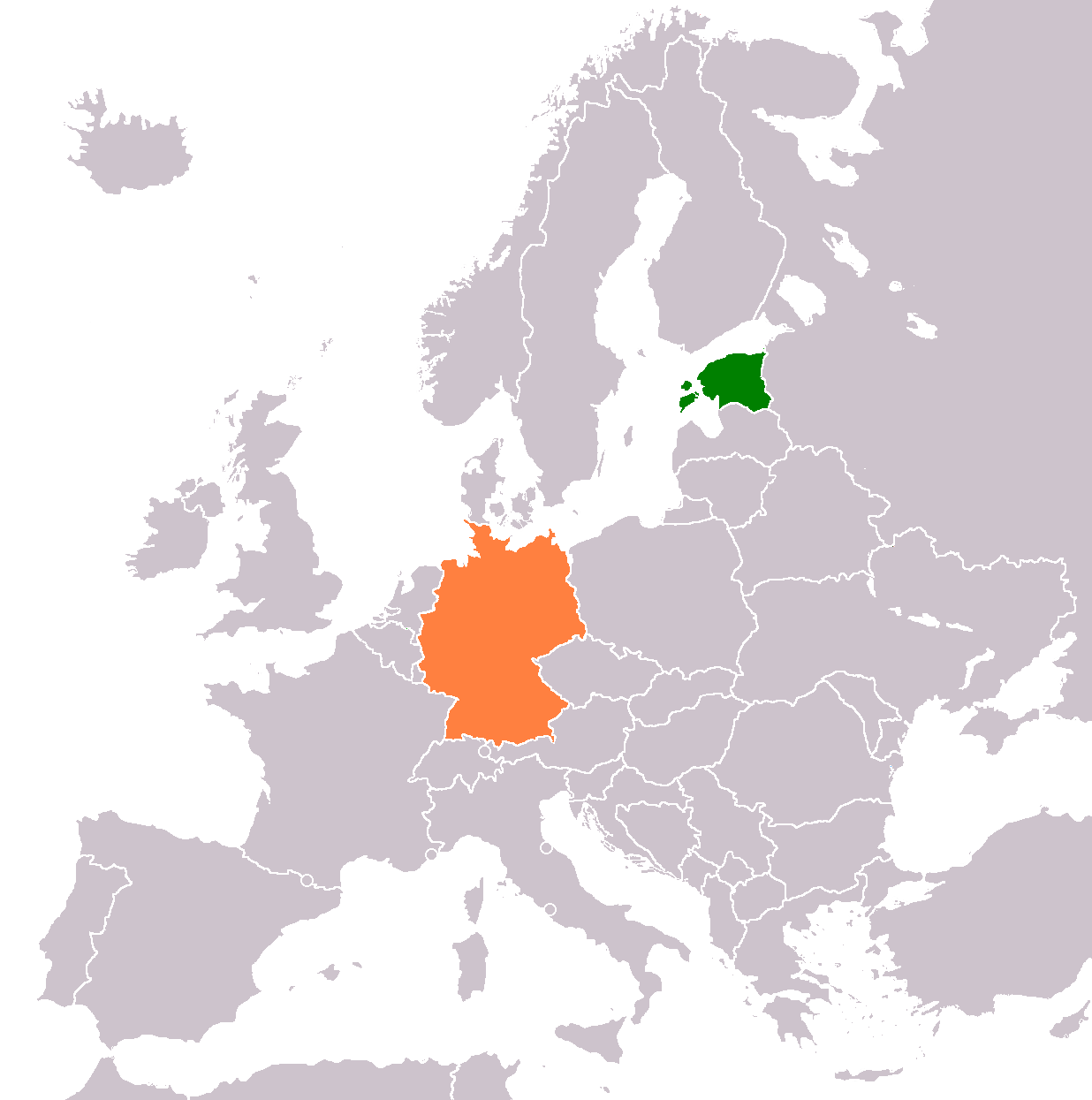

- Estonia: Germany

Estonia–Germany relations (Estonian: Eesti-Saksamaa suhted; German: Estnisch-deutsche Beziehungen) are foreign relations between Estonia and Germany. Estonia has an embassy in Berlin. Germany has an embassy in Tallinn. Both countries are full members of the European Union, NATO, OECD, OSCE, Council of Europe, Council of the Baltic Sea States, HELCOM and WTO.

== History ==
Since Estonia became part of the State of the Teutonic Order in the Middle Ages, Baltic Germans have played a significant role in Estonian society.

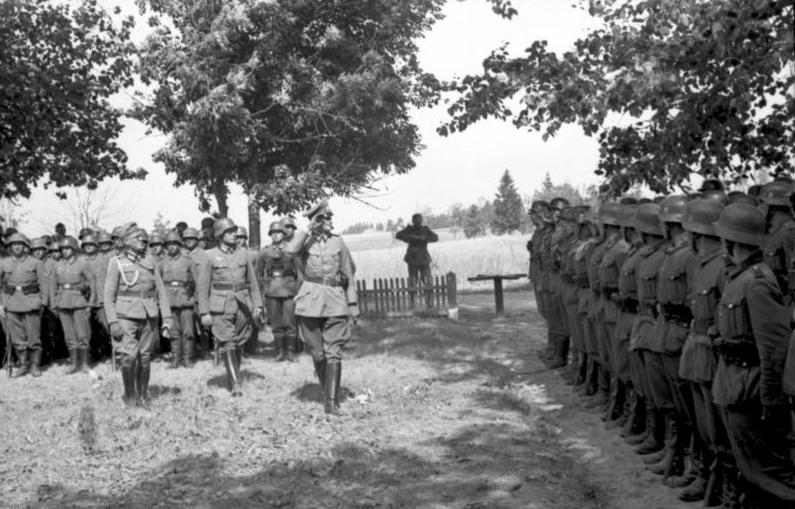
German troops occupying Estonia, August 1941

Between 1802 and 1893, the University of Tartu was a German-language institution; over 50 percent of the professors were "Reichsdeutsche" and another 40 percent were Baltic Germans.

During the final stages of World War I, Estonia was occupied by Germany, shortly after the Estonian Declaration of Independence of 24 February 1918. Germany first recognised Estonia's independence on 9 July 1921.

In 1939, the German Reich concluded a non-aggression pact with Estonia. However, under the Molotov–Ribbentrop Pact signed with the Soviet Union that same year, Estonia was assigned to the Soviet sphere of influence. This agreement facilitated the Soviet invasion and annexation of Estonia in June 1940, following a Soviet ultimatum. During this period, Baltic Germans were forcibly resettled to the Warthegau, and the new Soviet authorities persecuted, murdered, or deported large segments of the Estonian elite.

Following the German invasion of the Soviet Union on 22 June 1941, Estonia was under German occupation from August 1941 until October 1944. As German troops retreated, the country was re-occupied by the Soviet Union and incorporated as the Estonian SSR. In 1991, Estonia finally regained its independence from the disintegrating Soviet state alongside the other Baltic states through demonstrations such as the Baltic Way.

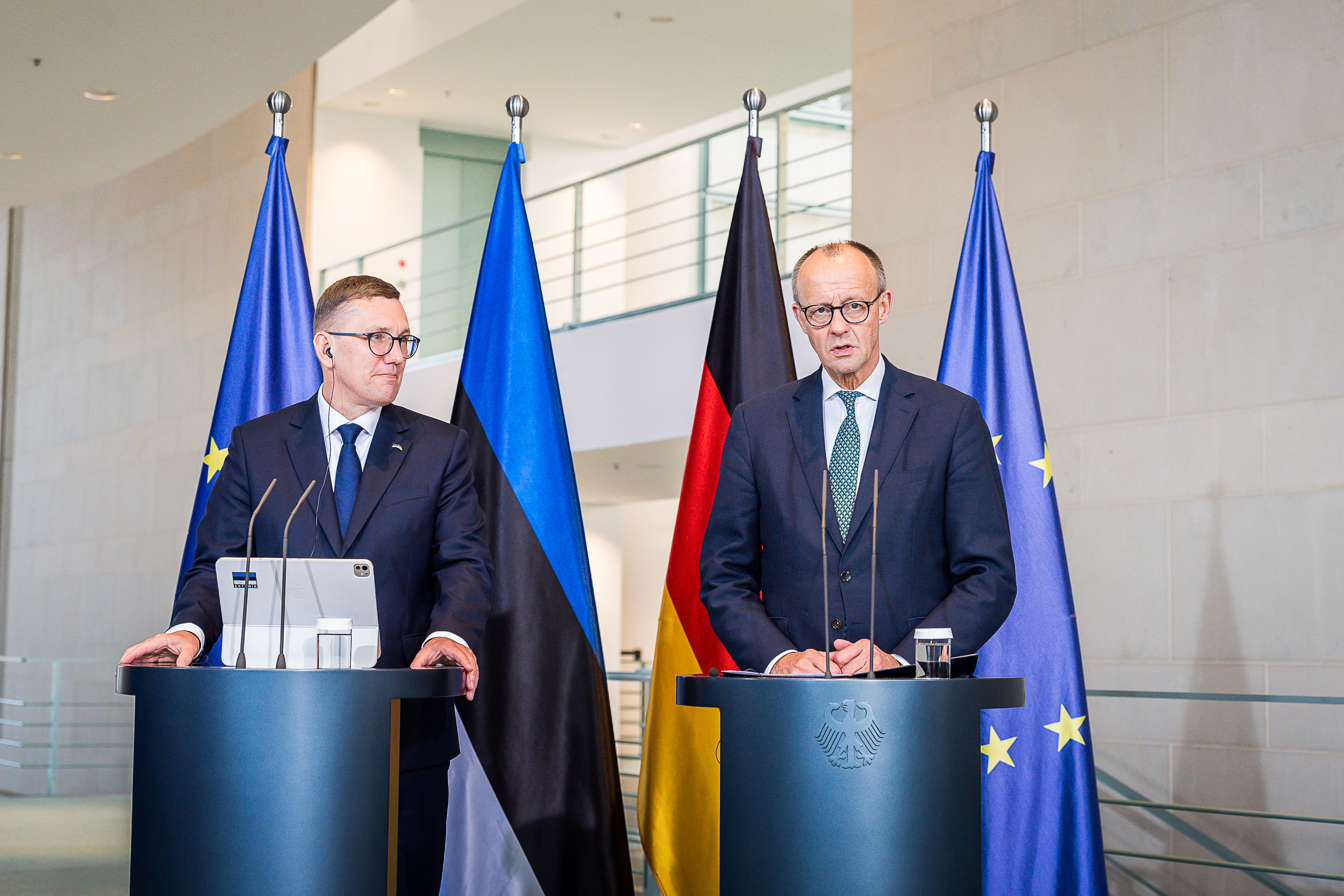
German Chancellor Friedrich Merz and Estonian Prime Minister Kristen Michal, 2025

On 28 August 1991, eight days after the Estonian declaration of independence, Germany and Estonia re-established diplomatic relations. Since then, the country has become integrated into European structures, and relations with its EU partner Germany remain friendly.

== Military cooperation ==
The German Air Force takes part in the NATO Baltic Air Policing mission to guard the airspace over the Baltic states including Estonia.

== International organizations ==
Germany is one of the founding members of the EU, while Estonia joined in 2004. Germany joined NATO in 1955, while Estonia joined in 2004.

== Resident diplomatic missions ==
- Estonia has an embassy in Berlin.
- Germany has an embassy in Tallinn.
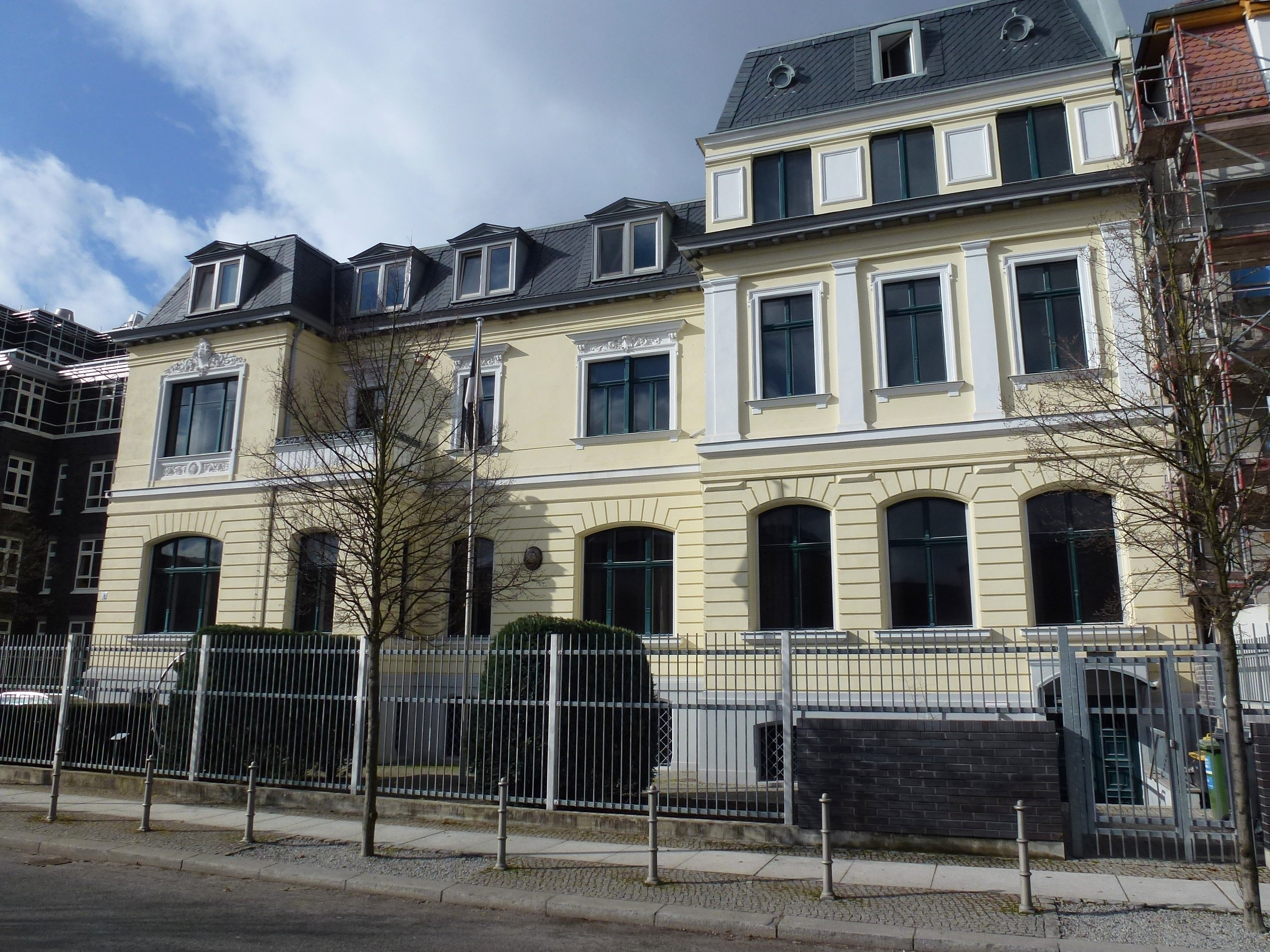
Embassy of Estonia in Berlin

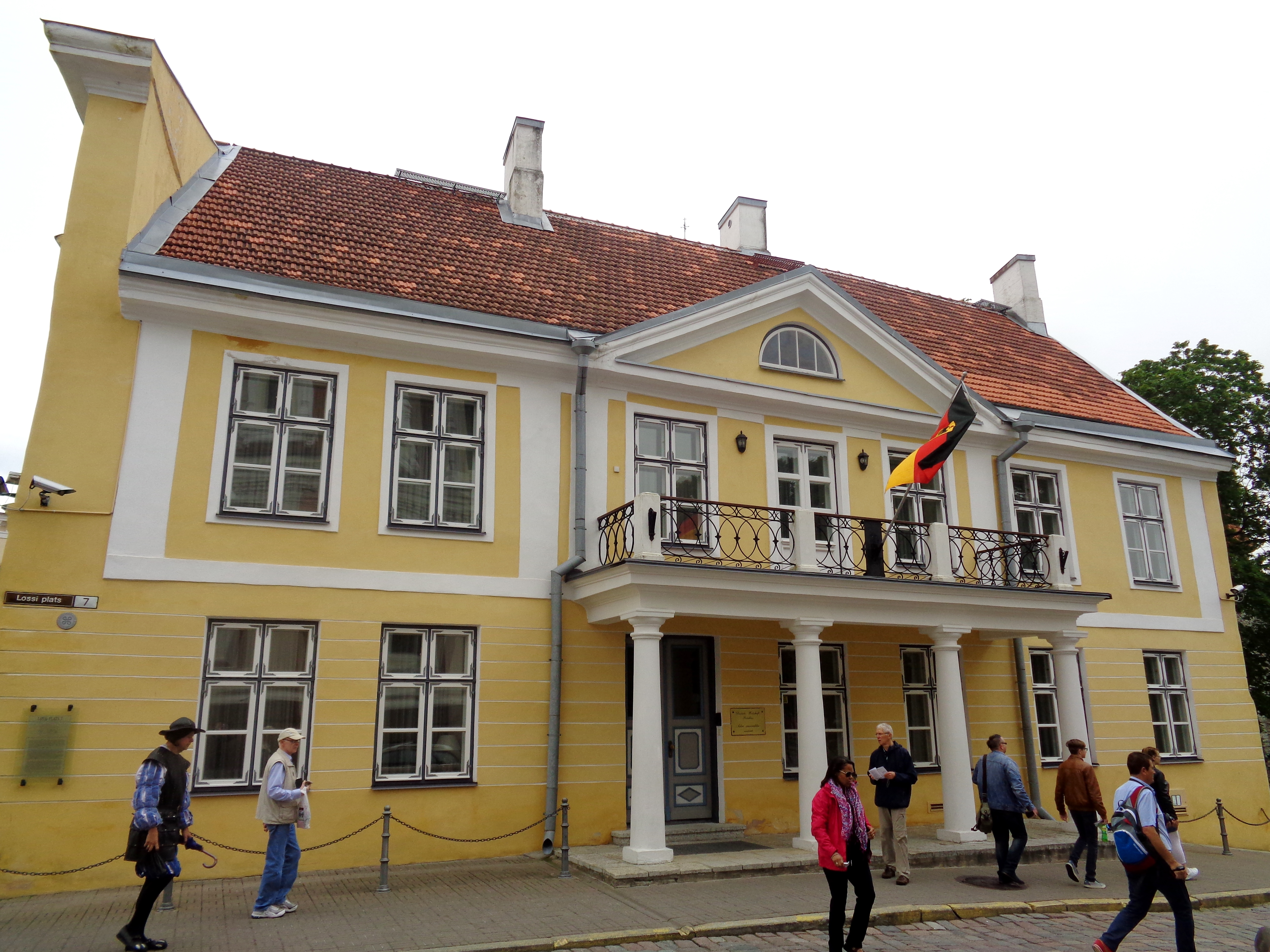
Embassy of Germany in Tallinn

== See also ==
- Foreign relations of Estonia
- Foreign relations of Germany
- Baltic Germans
- Baltic knighthoods
- List of Baltic Germans
- Deutsch-Baltische Gesellschaft
