= Estonia–France relations =

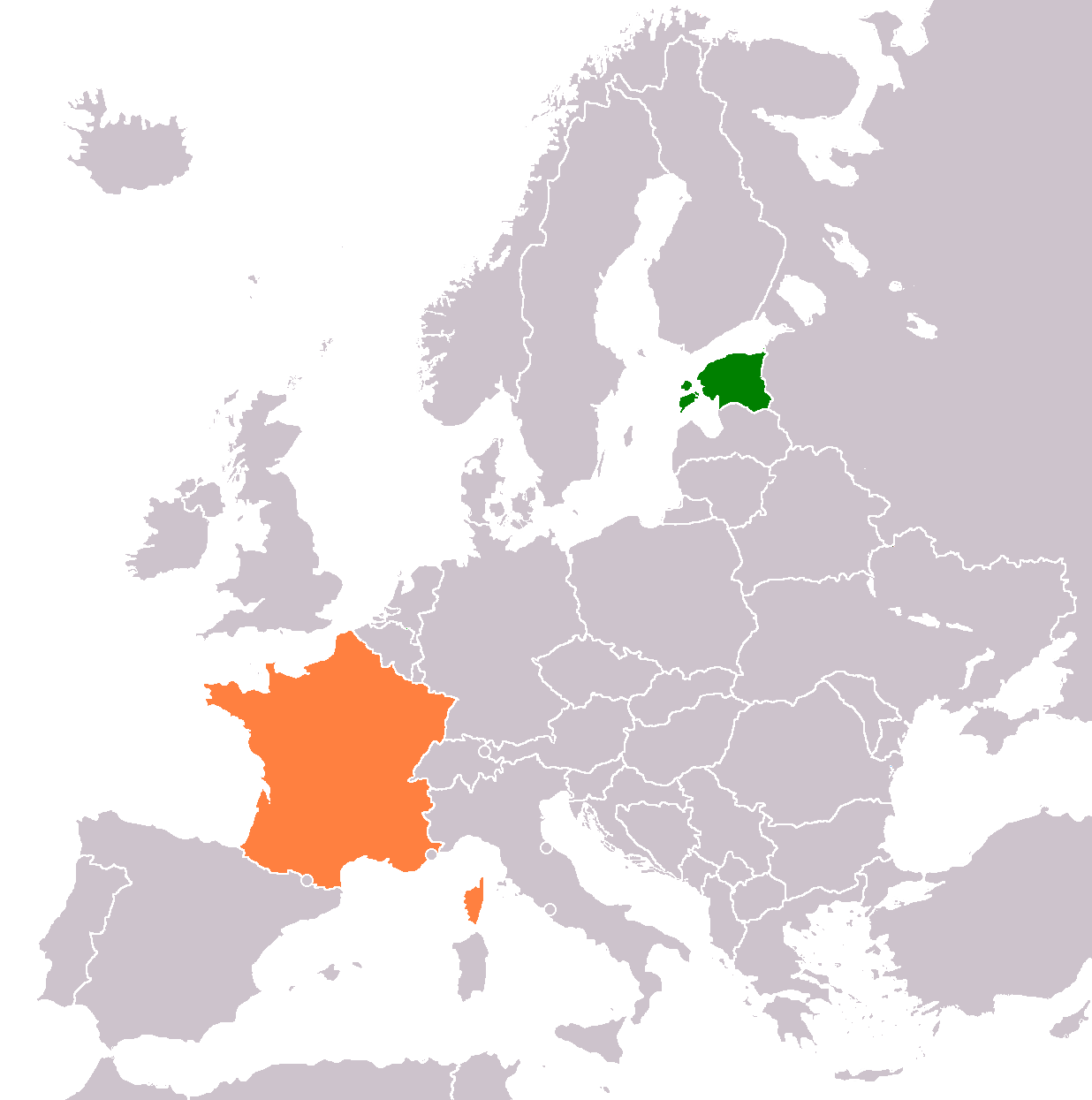
- Estonia: France

Estonia–France relations are the bilateral relations between Estonia and France. Both countries are full members of the Council of Europe, European Union, NATO and the Eurozone.

== History ==
France recognised Estonia on 26 January 1921. France never recognised the Soviet occupation of Estonia. France re-stated its recognition on 25 August 1991 and both established diplomatic relations on 30 August 1991. Political contacts include visits and meetings at the level of presidents, prime ministers, ministers and members of parliament.

Since 2010, Estonia is an observer on the Francophonie and French is the third most widely spoken language in Estonia, after English and Estonian itself. French is taught in schools throughout the country and there is a French high school, the "Lycee français de Tallinn".

In 2011, a bilateral military cooperation agreement was concluded. The French Air Force participated in the Baltic Air Policing mission to patrol Estonian airspace. French forces participate in the NATO Forward Presence mission, which aims to enhance the security of NATO's eastern flank. Cooperation also covers cybersecurity and the defense industry.

According to the French Foreign Ministry, "France and Estonia maintain close ties and regular political dialogue." Since 2014, French citizens have been able to travel and work in the Organization of Excellence for Combating Cyberterrorism and Defense. In 2016, a bilateral technical agreement was signed in the field of cyber defense. In 2017, in the United Kingdom, French weapons were purchased by Estonia.

In 2024, the value of Estonian exports to France reached EUR 373 million (making France Estonia's 13th largest export partner), while French exports to Estonia amounted to EUR 428 million.

== High level visits ==
=== High-level visits from Estonia to France ===
- President Toomas Hendrik Ilves was received at the Élysée Palace by the French president in January 2013.
- President Kersti Kaljulaid in December 2016.
- On 24 November 2021, Estonian Prime Minister Kaja Kallas met with President Emmanuel Macron at the Élysée Palace in Paris and spoke at the umbrella organization of French businesses MEDEF (Mouvement des Entreprises de France). In addition, Kallas participated in meetings with companies interested in Estonia.
- On 16 February 2022, Prime Minister Kallas met with French President Emmanuel Macron at the Élysée Palace in Paris. At the working dinner, the security situation in the Sahel region was discussed with the leaders of the European and African countries and regional organizations that support the region the most.
- On 9–11 March 2022, Prime Minister Kallas met with European Parliament President of the European Parliament Roberta Metsola in Strasbourg. Together with other MEPs, they discussed Russia's large-scale aggression against Ukraine, the security situation in Europe and the European Union's support for Ukraine. On the second day of the visit, Kallas participated in an informal meeting of European Union heads of state and government in Versailles, where Russia's military aggression against Ukraine, security issues, increasing defense capabilities and the possibilities of the green and digital revolutions to create a new growth model were discussed.
- On 18 October 2023, Prime Minister Kallas met with French President Emmanuel Macron at the Élysée Palace in Paris. Support for Ukraine and issues related to Russia were discussed. Kallas also participated in a business seminar held at the Paris Embassy, which focused on energy and green technologies. The Prime Minister delivered the closing speech at a conference dedicated to the 70th anniversary of the well-known French news magazine L’Express.
- On 10 November 2023, Prime Minister Kallas met with President Emmanuel Macron and President of Montenegro Jakov Milatović in Paris. A roundtable discussion on internet security took place.
- On 28–29 November 2023, Prime Minister Kallas met with President of France Emmanuel Macron, President of the European Council Charles Michel, Acting Prime Minister of the Netherlands Mark Rutte, Prime Minister of Luxembourg Luc Frieden, Prime Minister of Portugal António Costa at the Élysée Palace in Paris. The future of the European Union and its enlargement and its strategic agenda were discussed.
- On 26 February 2024, Prime Minister Kallas met with French President Emmanuel Macron at the Élysée Palace in Paris, where she spoke with the heads of government and state about continued support for Ukraine.
- On 3 May 2024, Prime Minister Kallas met with French President Emmanuel Macron and French Prime Minister Gabriel Attal at the Élysée Palace in Paris, where they discussed issues related to supporting Ukraine and ensuring European security, and talked about preparations for the upcoming NATO Washington Summit. Kaja Kallas participated in an event organized by the Robert Schuman Foundation at Sciences Po University.
- On 5–7 December 2024, Estonian Prime Minister Kristen Michal met with French President Emmanuel Macron in Paris, where the focus was on supporting Ukraine and improving the European Union's defense and competitiveness.
- On 27 March 2025, Prime Minister Kristen Michal attended a meeting of the "Coalition of the willing" in Paris hosted by President Macron.

=== High-level visits from France to Estonia ===
- In May 1992, President François Mitterrand was, the first Western leader to visit Estonia after the restoration of diplomatic relations.
- President Jacques Chirac made an official visit there in 2001.
- On 28–29 September 2017, President Emmanuel Macron travelled to Tallinn, Tapa Army Base and attended the EU Digital Summit and held a bilateral meeting with German Chancellor Angela Merkel. He then visited troops together with British Prime Minister Theresa May and Estonian Prime Minister Jüri Ratas at Tapa Army Base.

== Resident diplomatic missions ==
- Estonia has an embassy in Paris.
- France has an embassy in Tallinn.
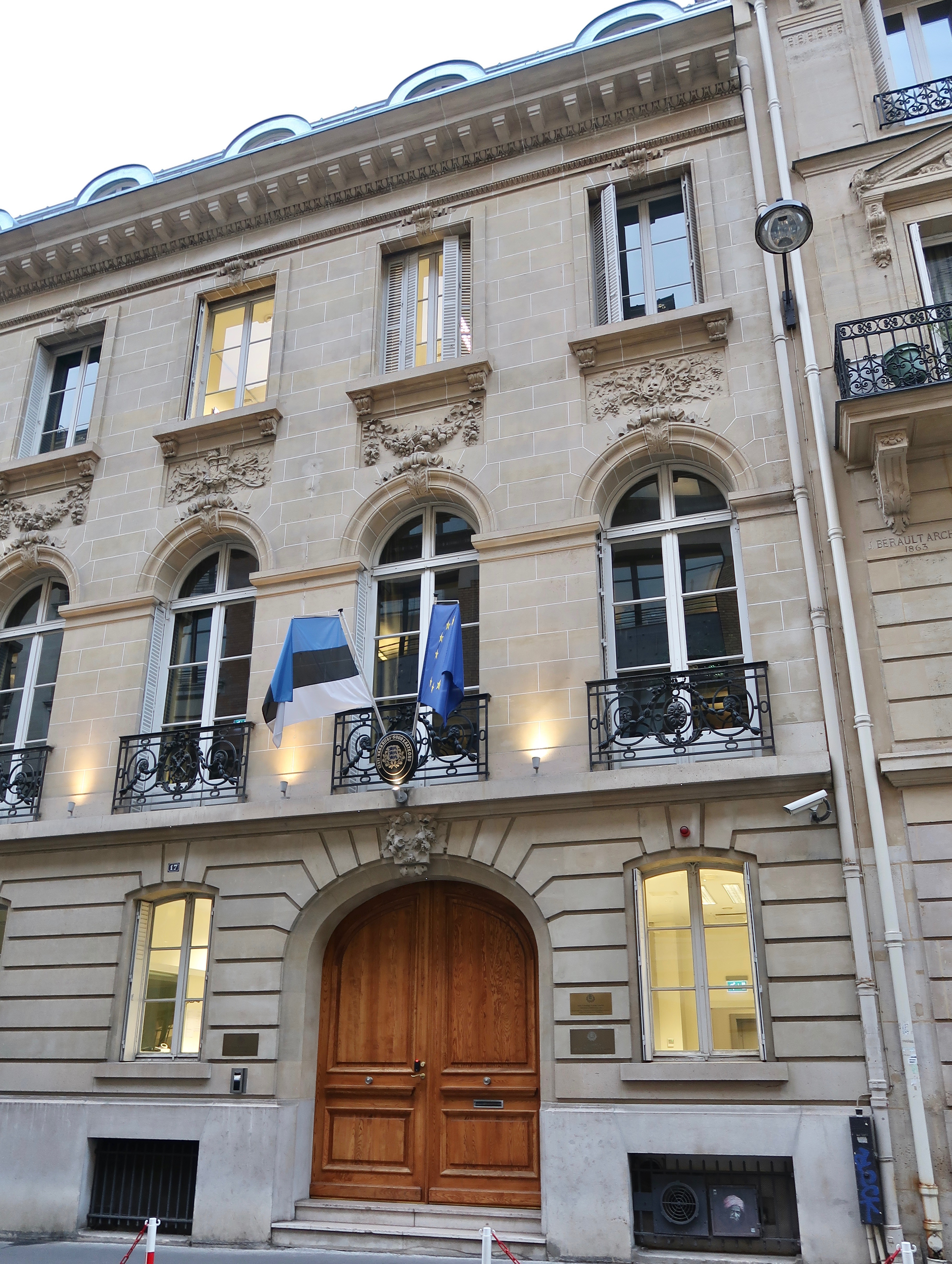
Embassy of Estonia in Paris

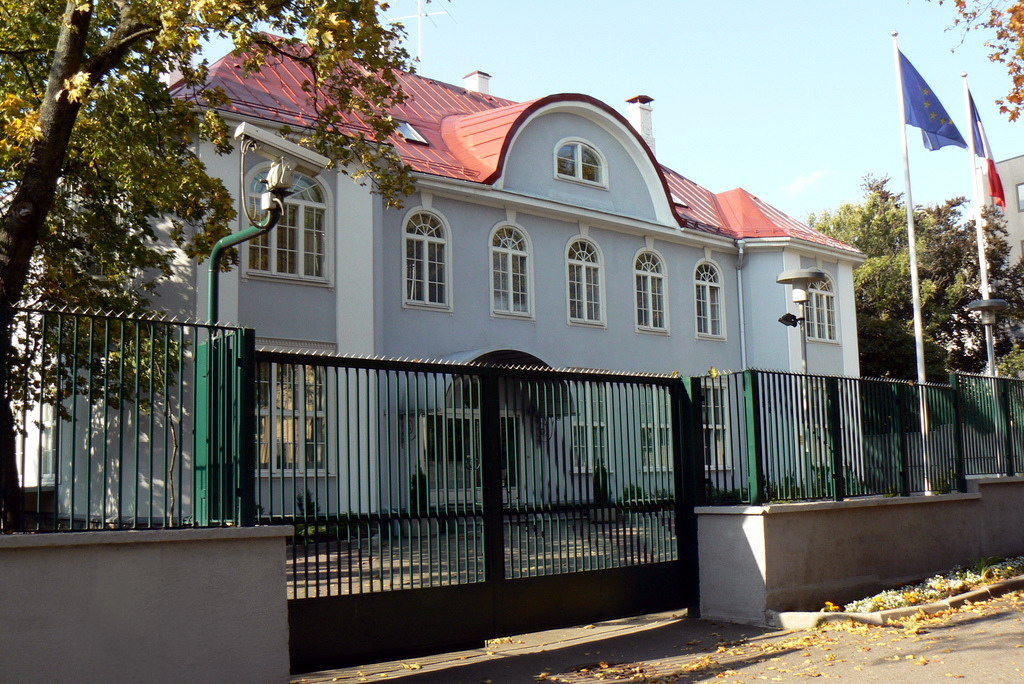
Embassy of France in Tallinn

== See also ==
- Foreign relations of Estonia
- Foreign relations of France
- NATO-EU relations
