= Estonia–Greece relations =

Bilateral relations of Estonia and Greece

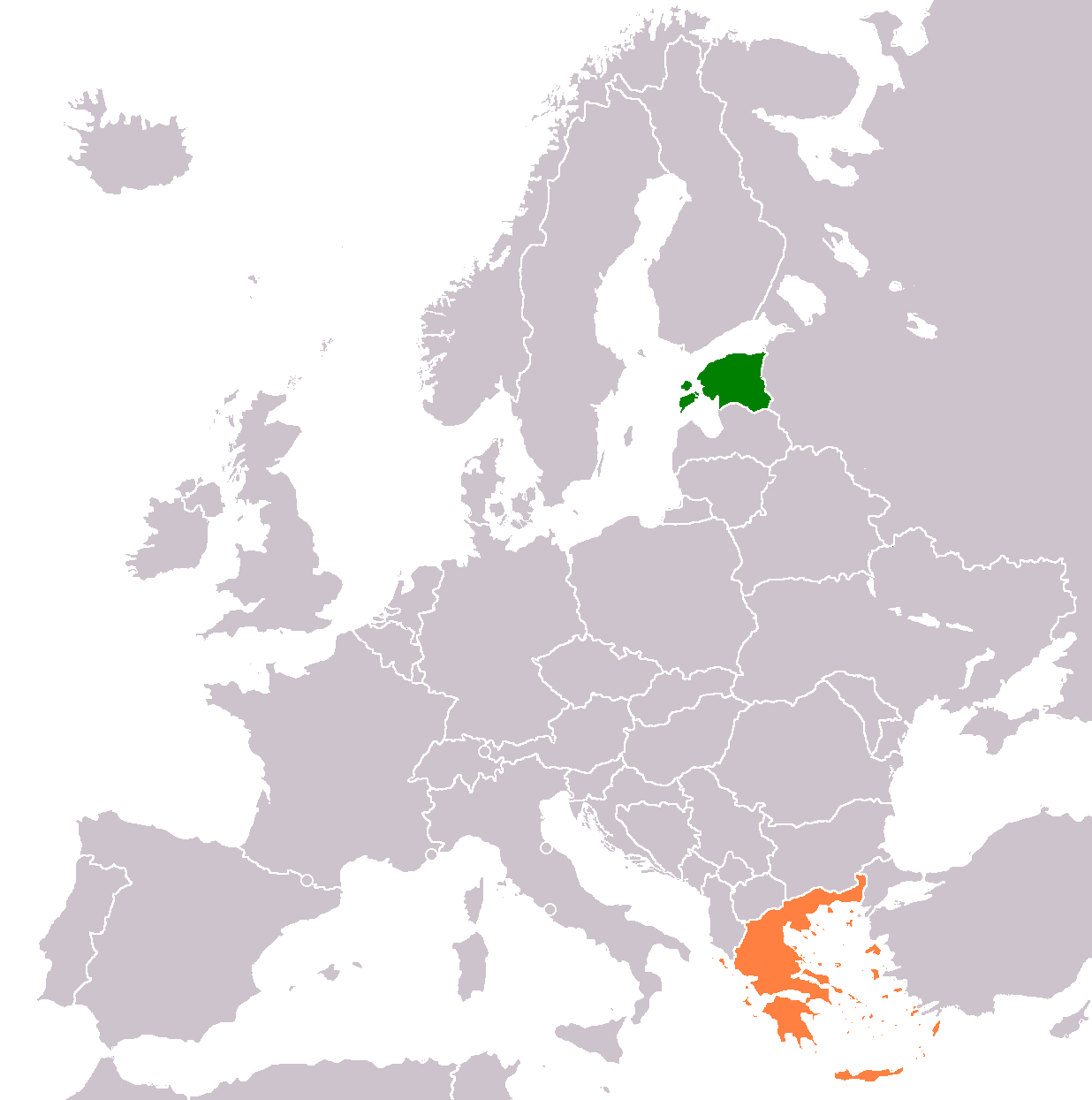
- Estonia: Greece

The Hellenic Republic recognised the Republic of Estonia on May 19, 1922. Greece never recognised the Soviet annexation of Estonia. Both countries re-established diplomatic relations on October 2, 1991. In April 1997, Estonia has established an embassy in Athens. The Greek embassy in Tallinn opened in January 2005. Both countries are full members of the Council of Europe, the European Union and NATO.

The current Ambassador of Estonia to Greece is Karin Rannu since 2022. The current Ambassador of Greece to Estonia is Georges Papadopoulos since 2022.

== High level visits ==
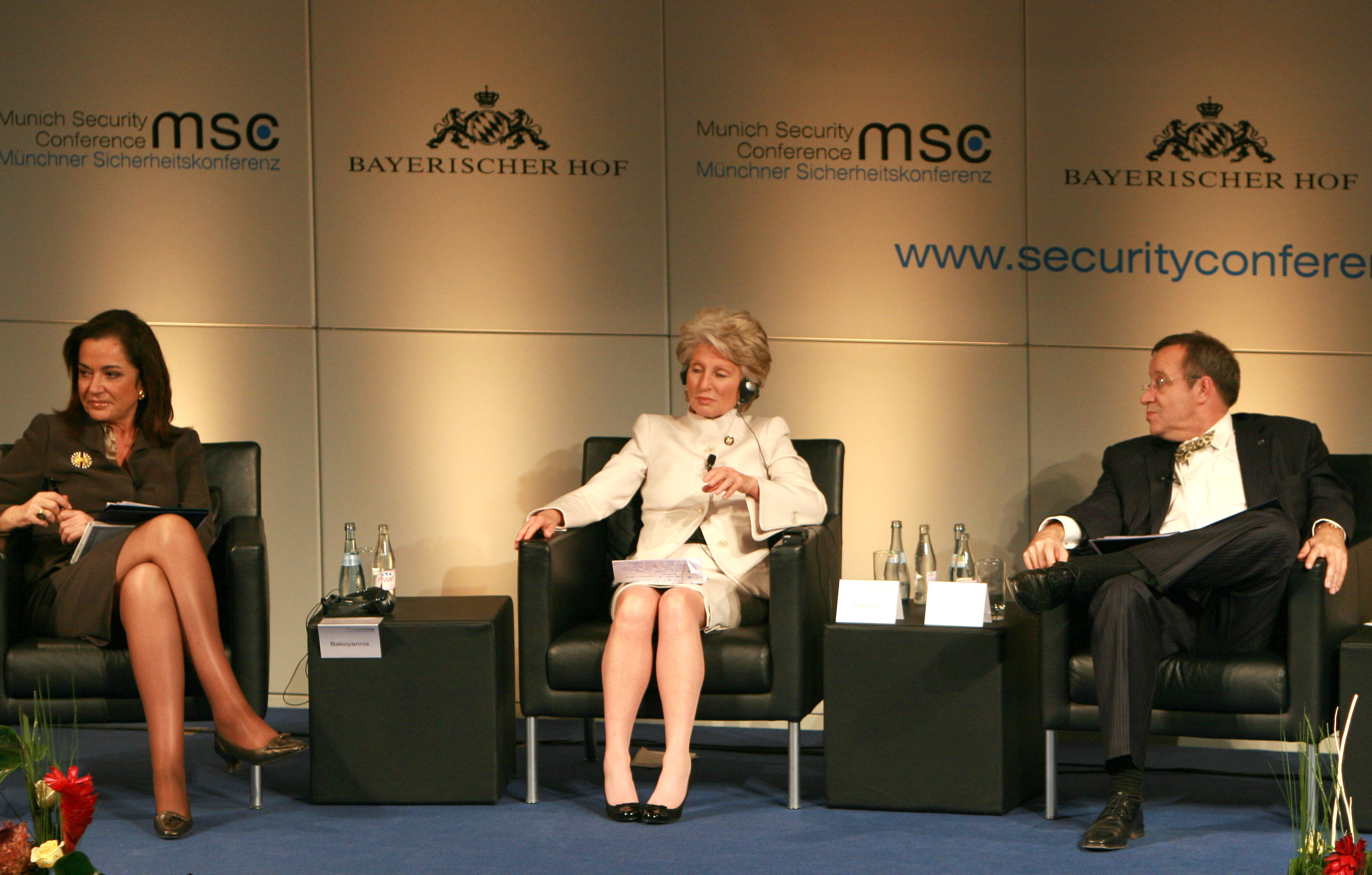
From left to right: Greek Minister of Foreign Affairs Dora Bakoyannis, US Congresswoman Jane Harman and President of Estonia Toomas Hendrik Ilves during the 45th Munich Security Conference in 2009

To Greece

- April 1997, Estonian Minister of Foreign Affairs Toomas Hendrik Ilves
- May 1999, President of Estonia Lennart Meri
- June 2004, Estonian Minister of Foreign Affairs Kristiina Ojuland
- June 2004, President of Estonia Arnold Rüütel and Estonian Minister of Culture Urmas Paet in relation with the 2004 Olympic Games
- May 2008, Estonian Minister of Foreign Affairs Urmas Paet

To Estonia

- October 2000, President of Greece Konstantinos Stephanopoulos
- May 2003, Prime Minister of Greece Costas Simitis (during the EU Presidency)

== List of bilateral agreements ==
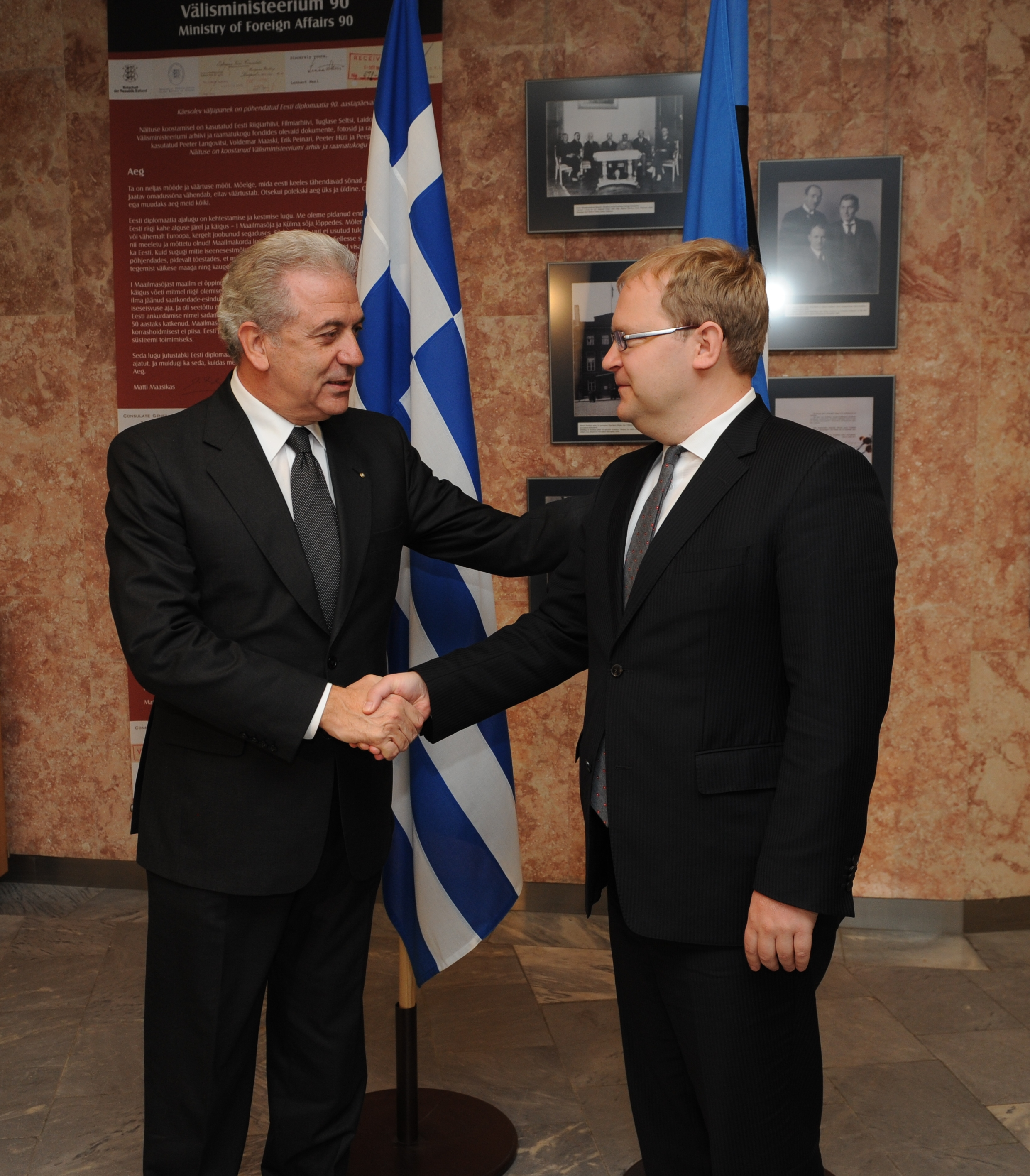
Estonian Foreign Minister Urmas Paet meeting with Greek Foreign Minister Dimitris Avramopoulos in February 2013

- Agreement on Cultural, Educational, and Scientific Cooperation (1999).
- Agreement on the Promotion and Mutual Protection of Investments (1997).
- Maritime Transport Agreement (1997).
- International passenger and goods transport agreement (1999).
- Memorandum of bilateral Economic cooperation (1999).
- Cooperation agreement in respect of Tourism (1999).

== Resident diplomatic missions ==
- Estonia has an embassy in Athens.
- Greece has an embassy in Tallinn.

== See also ==
- Foreign relations of Estonia
- Foreign relations of Greece
