= Estonia–Spain relations =

Bilateral relations of Estonia and Spain

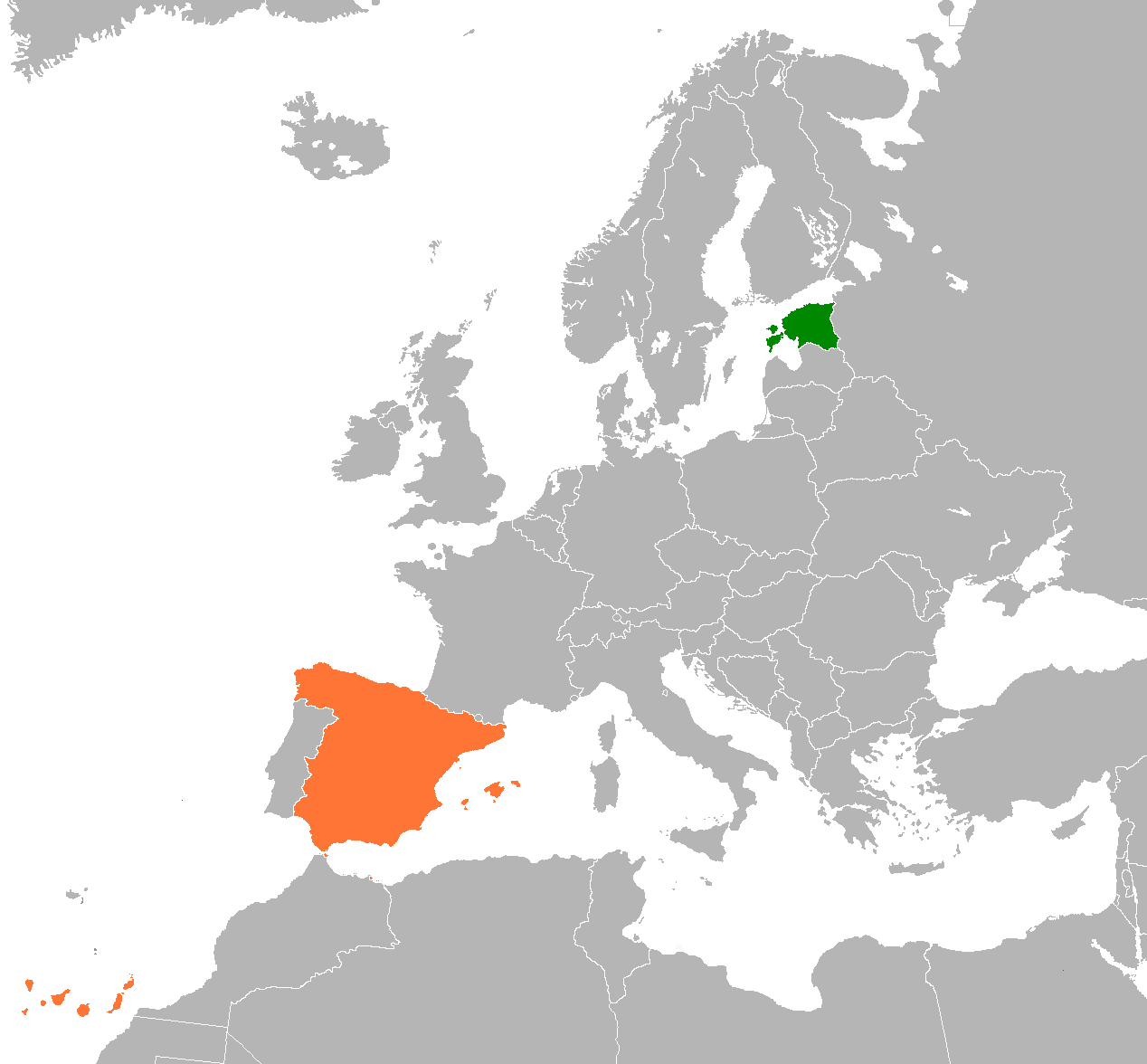
- Estonia: Spain

Estonia–Spain relations are the bilateral relations between these two countries. Estonia has an embassy in Madrid. Spain has an embassy in Tallinn. Both nations are members of the Council of Europe, European Union, NATO and the United Nations.

== History ==
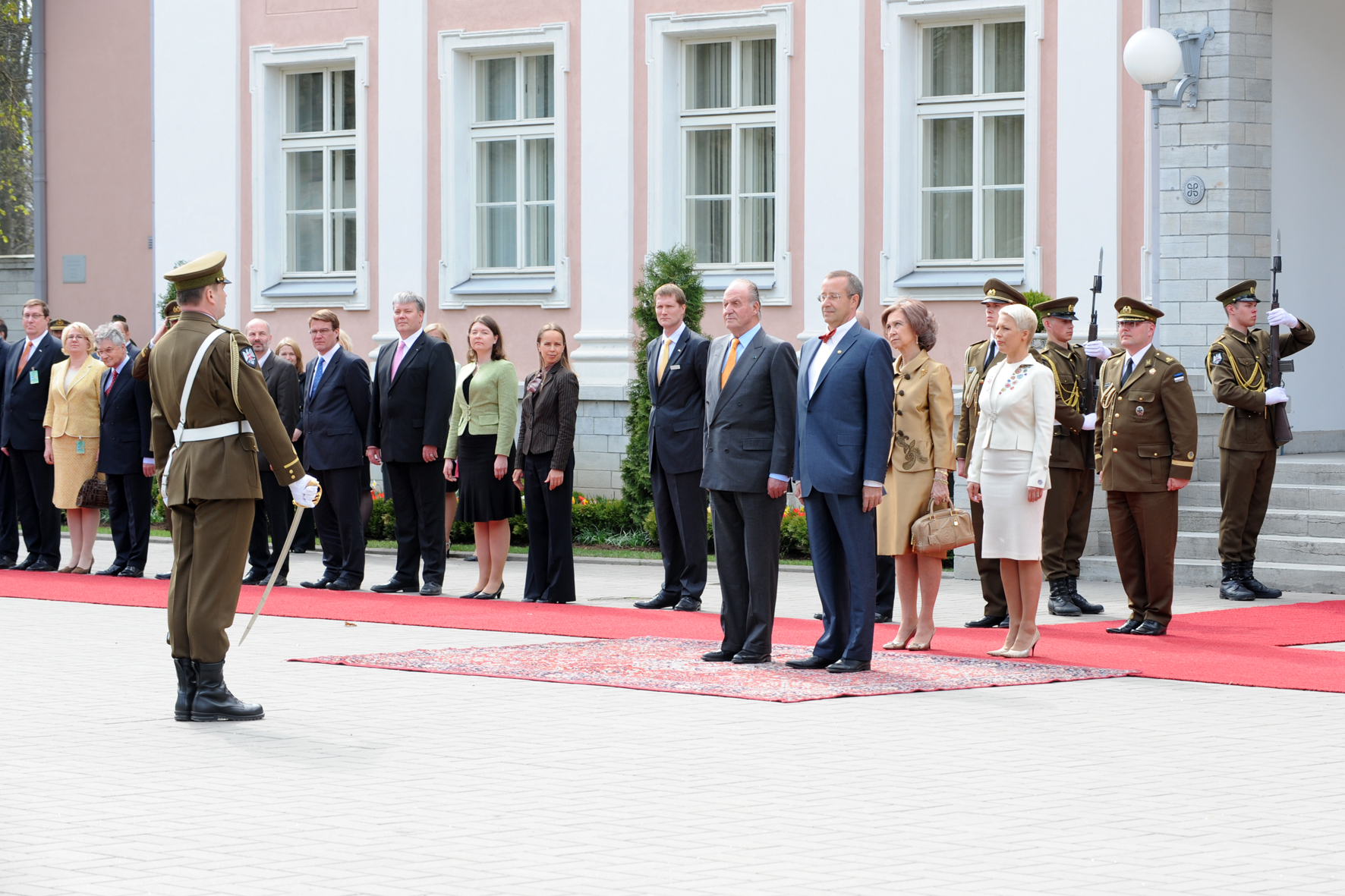
Meeting of King of Spain Juan Carlos I and President of Estonia Toomas Hendrik Ilves in Tallinn in 2009

International relations between Spain and Estonia began in 1921, when Spain recognized the independence of the Republic of Estonia.

Despite Spanish neutrality in World War II, some Spanish nationals were among the prisoners of a subcamp of the Vaivara concentration camp, operated by the Germans in Aseri in occupied Estonia.

On 24 August 1991, Spain once again recognized Estonia's independence from Soviet Union. Both countries established diplomatic relations on 10 September of the same year. On 3 December 1992 Spain established an Honorary Consular Office in Tallinn under the Spanish embassy of Helsinki, it was not until 2004 when it opened its own embassy in the capital Estonia. The first ambassador of Spain in Estonia was Miguel Bauzá y More, who held the position until 11 January 2008 when he was replaced by Eduardo Ibáñez López-Dóriga. For its part Estonia opened an embassy in Madrid in 1997, between 2000 and 2007 the ambassador was Andres Tomasberg, since 2007 the position is held by Andres Rundu. Currently, the relations between the two countries are framed within the scope of the European Union.

== Economic relations ==
Exchanges between Estonia and Spain have maintained an upward pace with a positive balance in favor of Spain which, in 2007, sold products to Estonia for a total of 120 million euros while importing for a total of 54 million . The main imports from Estonia are composed of fuel and mineral oils, wood, charcoal, manufacturing sy steel and iron from smelting waste. While Spain's main exports are made up of automobiles, tractor is, ceramic products and edible fruits.

On the other hand, the investments between both countries have reached a more even level, since although in 2006 Estonia only invested 6,100 euros in Spain the following year it did so for a value of 1,984,420 euros. In contrast, Spain in 2006 invested 1,022,170 euros while in 2007, it was reduced to 283,230.

At the end of 2008, the Estonian Hispanic Chamber of Commerce was established with headquarters in Tallinn.

== Diaspora ==
In 2007, the number of Spaniards residing in Estonia stood at 54 people, while the number of non-resident Spaniards was 55.

In 2021, the number of Spaniards residing in Estonia grew to 767 people

== Tourism ==
The number of Spanish tourists traveling to Estonia has been increasing every year, in 2006 were 15,150 who spent the night at least one night in the country. However, most tourists visiting Estonia do so through cruise ships or from Helsinki on a round trip on the same day, so it is estimated that the number of Spanish visitors is much higher.

Estonia is present at the tourism fairs in Barcelona, EIBTM (since 2004) and Madrid, FITUR (since 2005). In addition, the airline Estonian Air has since 2006 a regular line between Tallinn and Barcelona.

== Cultural relations ==
Since 1996, Spanish studies can be taken at Tartu University. The University of Tallinn introduced this possibility in 2001 and since 2003 this university has an examination center of the Instituto Cervantes.

== Agreements ==
Estonia and Spain have signed the following agreements: in 1997 the Agreement on international road transport; in 1998 the Agreement for the Protection of Investments; in 1999 the Protocol of cooperation between the Ministries of Defense; in 2000 the Agreement on the reciprocal abolition of visas, the Agreement for the readmission of persons and the Agreement for the extradition of criminals; in 2005 the Agreement to avoid double taxation; and in 2007 the Agreement for the protection of classified information and the Agreement for cooperation in culture and education.

== Resident diplomatic missions ==
- Estonia has an embassy in Madrid.
- Spain has an embassy in Tallinn.
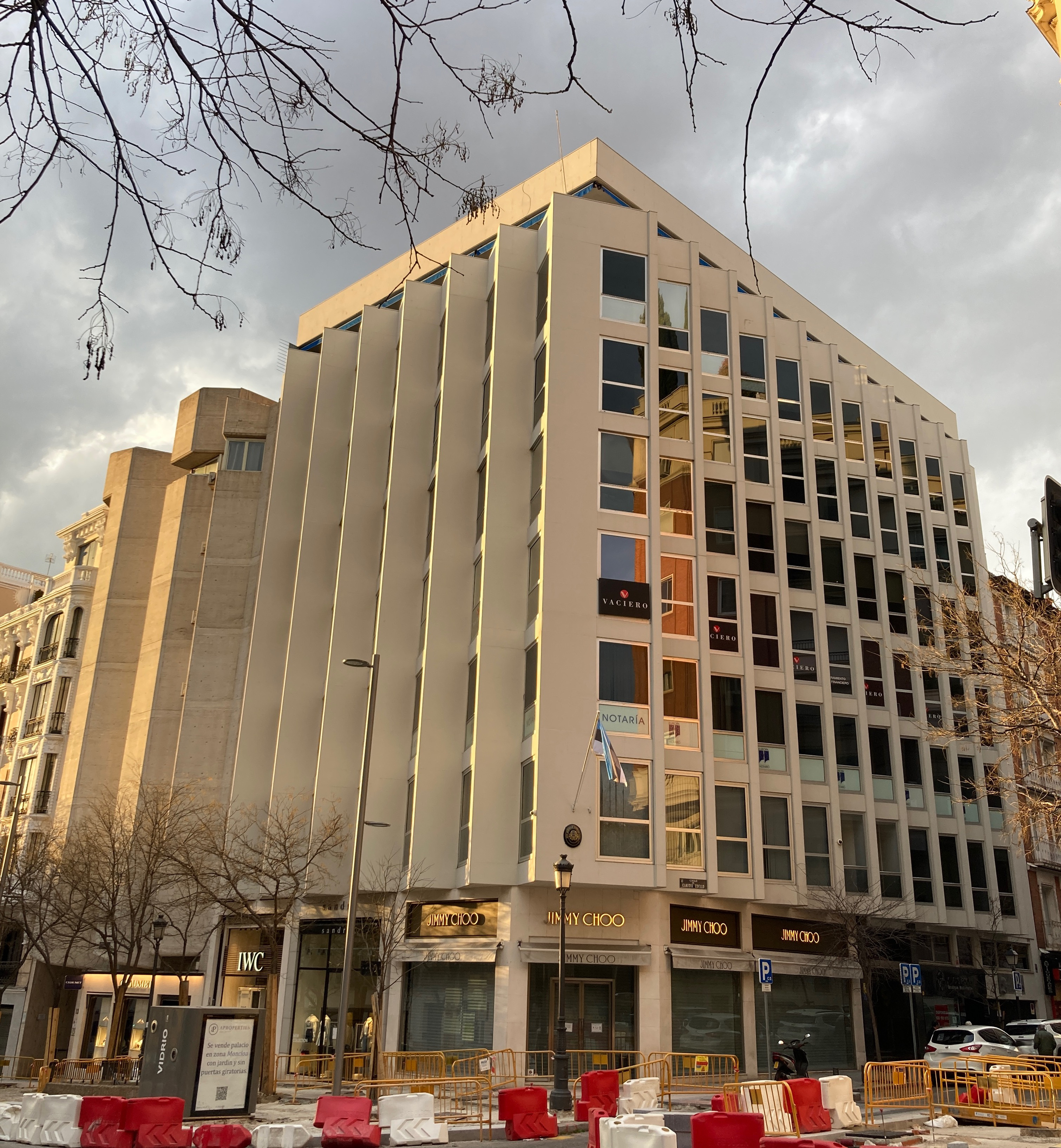
Embassy of Estonia in Madrid

Embassy of Spain in Tallinn

== See also ==
- Foreign relations of Estonia
- Foreign relations of Spain
