= French Institute of Estonia =

French cultural center in Tallinn

Coordinates: 59°26′11″N 24°44′43″E

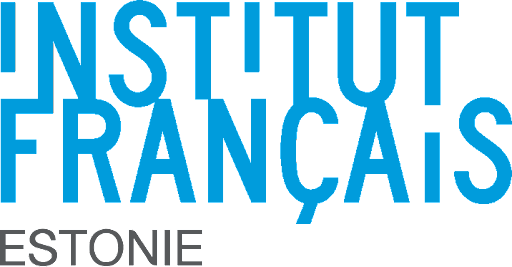
- Location: Kuninga 4 Tallinn
- Website: Official website

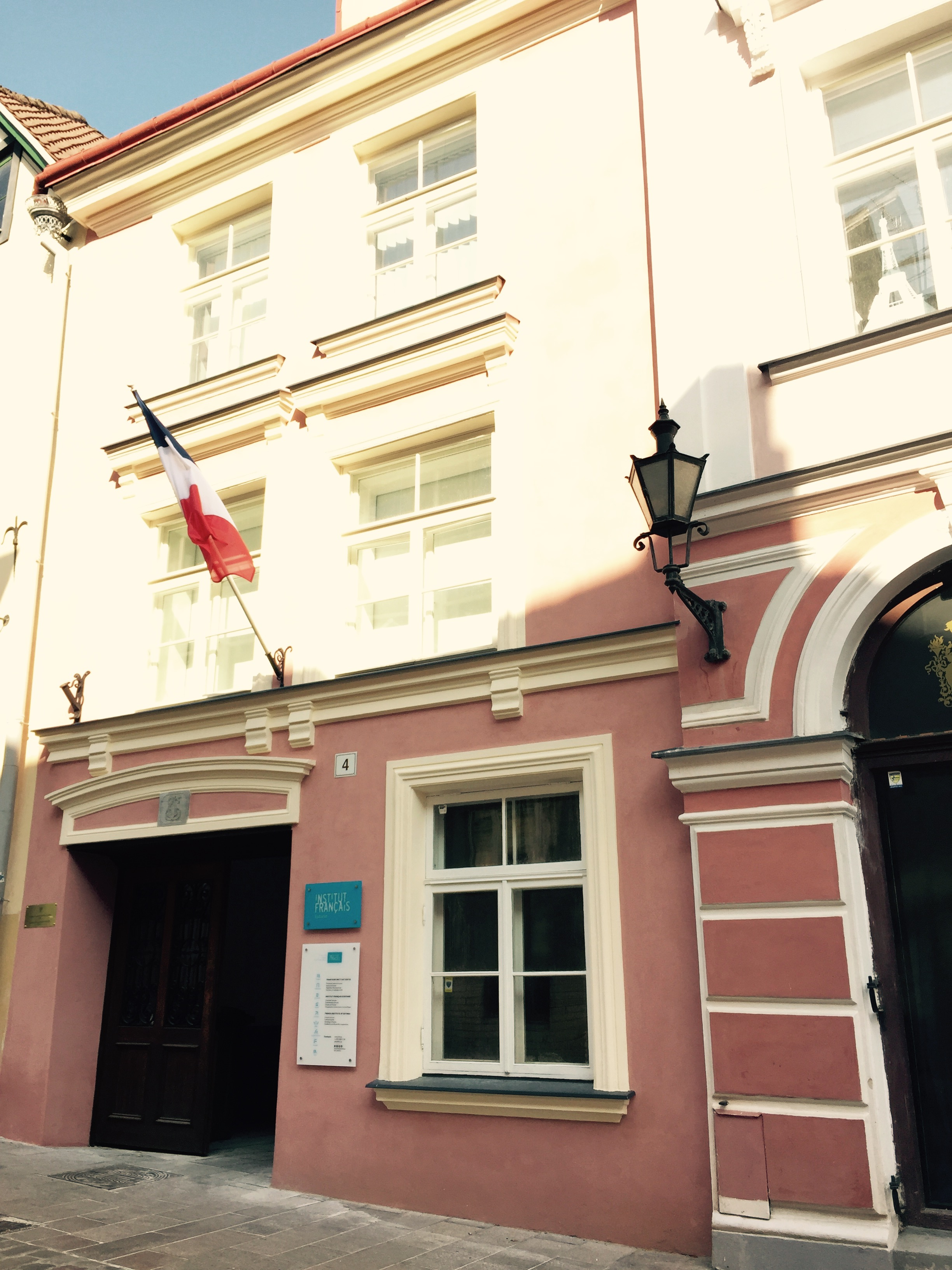
The French Institute of Estonia

The French Institute of Estonia (Estonian: Prantsuse Instituut Eestis, French: l'Institut français d'Estonie, IFE) was founded in 1992 in Tallinn to promote cultural, scientific, academic, and language cooperation between France and Estonia.

== Overview ==
IFE is part of the French cultural network. Since its creation, the Institute has been located at Kuninga, 4, in Tallinn. The Institute was inaugurated on 14 May 1992 by Roland Dumas, French Minister of State and Foreign Affairs, in the presence of Jaan Minitski, Estonian Minister of Foreign Affairs, Märt Kubo, Minister of Culture, and Rein Loik, Minister of National Education of the Republic of Estonia.

== Activities ==
=== Cultural cooperation ===
IFE sets up cultural and artistic cooperations, particularly in the fields of contemporary music, theatre, cinema, design, architecture, and urban planning .

IFE organizes the Night of Ideas annually (Nuit des idées in French) under the patronage of the French Institute and the French Ministry of Europe and Foreign Affairs. It also supports a wide variety of events in Estonia, like the venue of French artists to Estonia. Tt has supported Jazzkaar, Viljandi Folk Festival, guitar, piano, and clavecin festivals.

IFE has supported the Documentary Film Festival in Pärnu et Matsalu, DocPoint in Tallinn, Wilcom in Viljandi, PÖFF in Tallinn, HÖFF in Haapsalu or the Tartu World Film Festival are supported yearly.

IFE also works with the Estonian national broadcaster, (ETV), in order to promote French cinema in Estonia.

=== Promotion of French and francophone literature ===
An online media library at IFE has been available to the public since 2014: Culturethèque. This digital portal provides access to many resources in French throughout Estonia.

IFE works closely with translators and publishing houses wishing to translate and publish French literature. Translators can submit an application for a grant from the Centre national du livre that will allow them to stay in France to carry out a translation project.

=== French language ===
IFE offers French language courses for all levels of the Common European Framework of Reference for Languages (CEFR), from A1 to C2. The Institute is an accredited official examination centre where it is possible to pass and obtain a French language certification such as DELF-DALF. The teaching of French at IFE is certified by the Estonian Ministry of Education.

IFE has relations with all Estonian schools that teach French. For Tallinn, this includes:

- The Vanalinna Hariduskolleegium (VHK)
- The European School of Tallinn
- The Gustav Adolf School

=== Academic and scientific cooperation ===
IFE helps Estonian students and researchers when they are conducting research in France.

A space is dedicated to Campus France, in the premises of the IFE; it is an information centre for higher education and French courses in France. A performance is held weekly.

=== Digital and innovation cooperation ===
The creation of a digital innovation cooperation in 2016 has made it possible to implement a strategy to promote French expertise in the field of digital and bring together decision-makers and civil society of the two countries. The previous attaché in charge of innovation and technology have been Geoffroy Berson, Sebastien Leroux, Nathan Marcel-Millet and Danaë Di Salvo.

The innovation cooperation's strategy has 3 objectives:

- Raise awareness among the Estonian public of French expertise on promising digital issues in both countries (holding public events, publishing online content, activity on social networks)
- Facilitate cooperation between French and Estonian decision-makers (organisation of delegation visits, events with local institutions)
- Bring civil societies closer together and facilitate their cooperation

== Directors of IFE and cultural advisor ==
The following have been directors of the IFE:

- 1991–1995: Béatrice Boillot
- 1995–1999: Catherine Suard
- 1999–2003: Geneviéve Ichard
- 2003–2007: Jean-Louis Pelletan
- 2007–2011: Denis Duclos
- 2011–2015: Bernard Paqueteau
- 2015–2019: Anne Chounet-Cambas
- 2019–2023: Eric Bultel
- 2023–: Emmanuel Rimbert

== See also ==
- French Embassy in Estonia
- Lycée français de Tallinn
