= List of envoys of Estonia =

This is a list of envoys of Estonia, that is, diplomats representing Estonia; until 1991, Estonian diplomats had the rank of Envoy Extraordinary and Minister Plenipotentiary.

Friedrich Akel (1871–1941)

- 1922–1923 to Finland
- 1928–1933 to Sweden, Norway and Denmark
- 1934–1936 to Germany and Netherlands

Ado Birk (1883–1942)

- 1922–1926 to the Soviet Union

Aleksander Hellat (1881–1943)

- 1921–1922 to Latvia and Poland
- 1922 to Romania, Hungary and Greece
- 1923–1931 to Finland
- 1925–1927 to Hungary

Oskar Kallas (1868–1946)

- 1920–1922 to Finland
- 1922–1934 to United Kingdom and Netherlands

Heinrich Laretei (1892–1973)

- 1926–1928 to the Soviet Union
- 1928–1931 to Lithuania
- 1936–1940 to Sweden, Denmark and Norway

Jaan Lattik (1878–1967)

- 1939–1940 to Lithuania

Juhan Leppik (1894–1965)

- 1924–1927 to Poland and Romania
- 1931–1936 to Lithuania
- 1936–1940 to Italy
- 1937–1940 to Hungary
- 1937–1938 to Austria

Johannes Markus (1884–1969)

- 1935–1939 to Poland, Romania and Czechoslovakia
- 1939–1940 to Turkey, Hungary and Romania

Karl Menning (1874–1941)

- 1923–1933 to Germany
- 1925–1933 to Austria
- 1931–1933 to Hungary
- 1933–1937 to Latvia

Rudolf Möllerson (1892–1940)

- 1937–1939 to Finland
- 1939–1940 to Germany
- 1940 to Netherlands

Ants Piip (1884–1942)

- 1923–1925 to the United States

Karl Robert Pusta (1883–1963)

- 1921–1932 to France
- 1921–1923 to Italy
- 1923–1932 to Belgium
- 1928–1932 to Spain
- 1932–1934 to Poland, Romania and Czechoslovakia
- 1935 to Sweden, Norway and Denmark

August Rei (1886–1963)

- 1938–1940 to Soviet union

Hans Rebane (1882–1961)

- 1931–1937 to Finland
- 1937–1940 to Latvia

August Torma (1895–1971)

- 1931–1934 to Italy
- 1931–1939 to the League of Nations
- 1934–1971 to the United Kingdom

Julius Seljamaa (1883–1936)

- 1922–1928 to Latvia
- 1925–1926 to Lithuania
- 1928–1933 to the Soviet Union

Karl Selter (1898–1958)

- 1939–1940 to the League of Nations and Vatican
- 1940 to Switzerland

Otto Strandman (1875–1941)

- 1927–1929 to Poland, Romania and Czechoslovakia
- 1933–1939 to France, Belgium, Spain and Vatican

Karl Tofer (1885–1942)

- 1927–1931 to Italy
- 1927–1930 to Hungary
- 1930–1932 to Poland, Romania and Czechoslovakia
- 1933–1936 to the Soviet Union
- 1936–1939 to Germany and Netherlands

August Traksmaa (1893–1942)

- 1936–1937 to the Soviet Union

Tõnis Vares (1859–1925)

- 1921–1922 to the Soviet Russia

Eduard Virgo (1878–1938)

- 1928–1931 to Latvia

Aleksander Warma (1890–1970)

- 1938–1939 to Lithuania
- 1939–1944 to Finland

Oskar Öpik (1895–1974)

- 1936–1938 to Lithuania
- 1940 to France
