= 2001 Estonian presidential election =

← 1996	27 August - 21 September 2001	2006 →
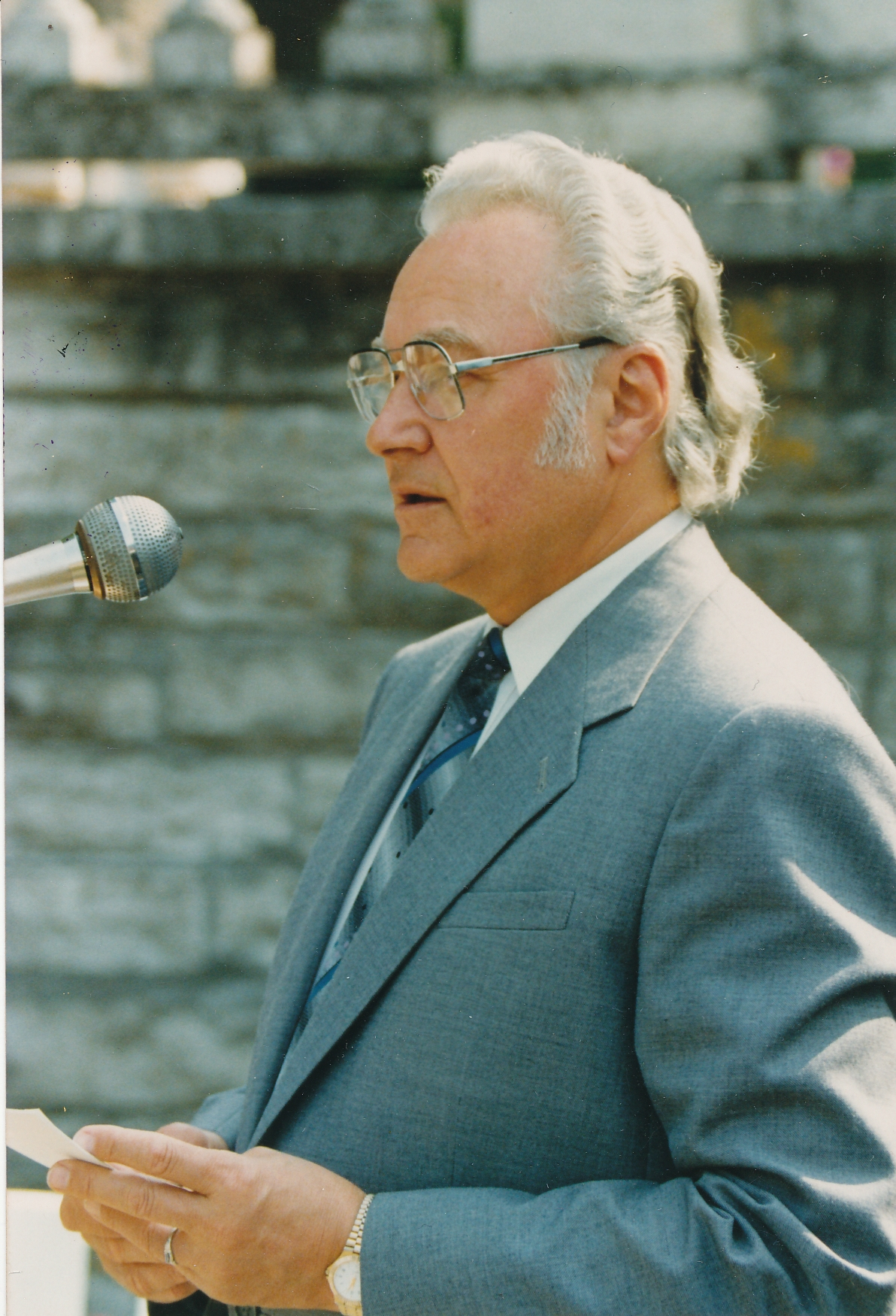

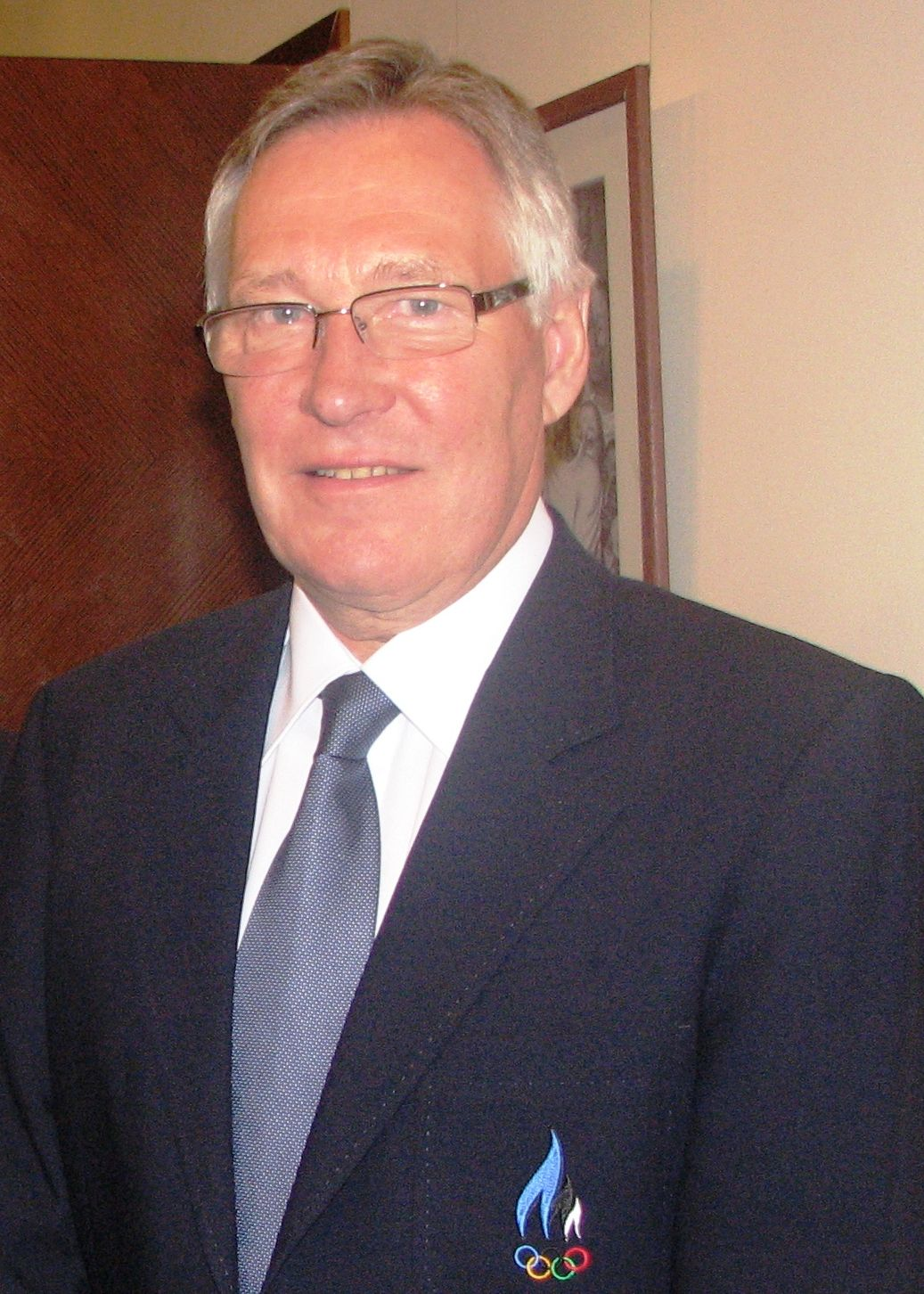

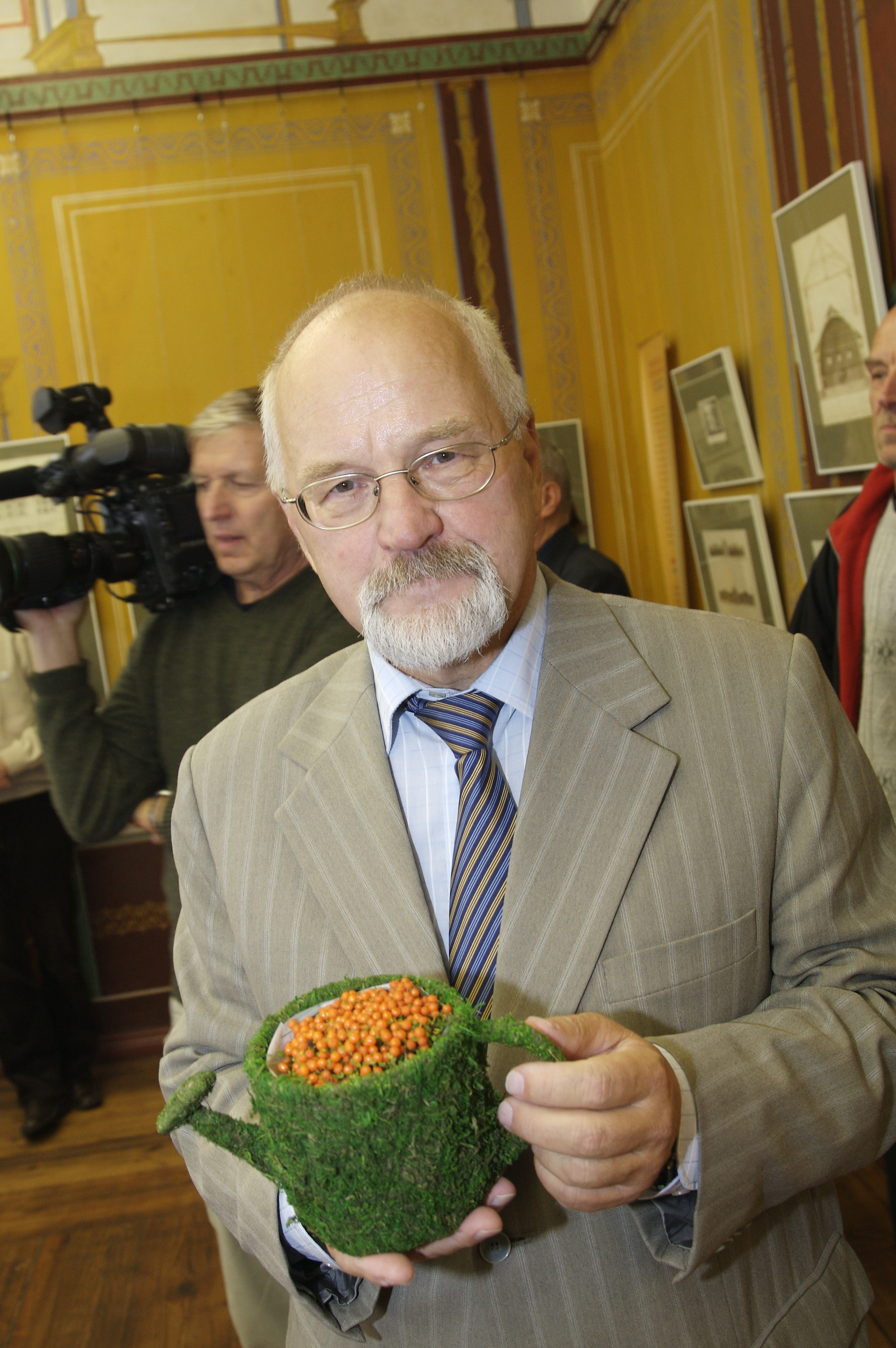

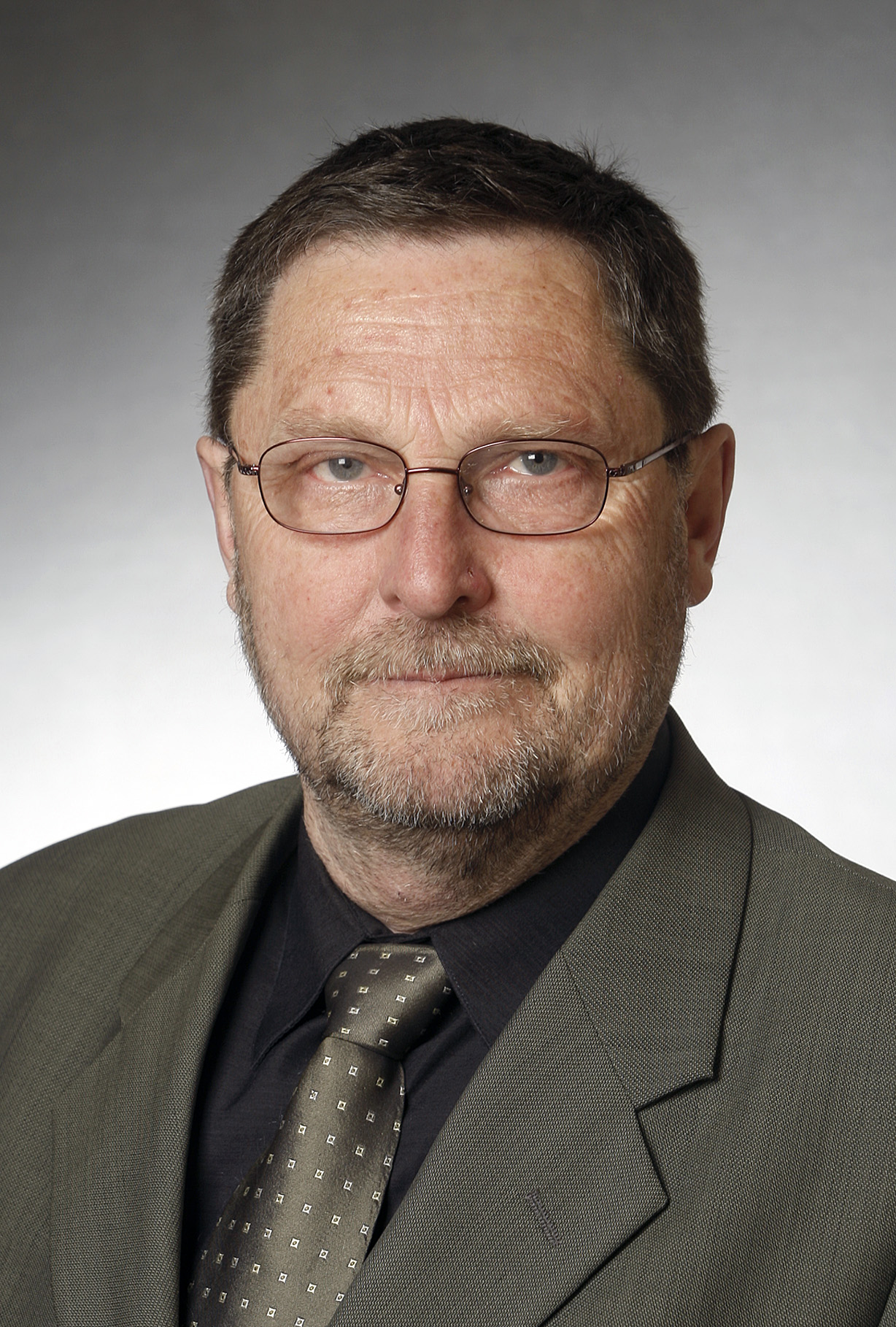

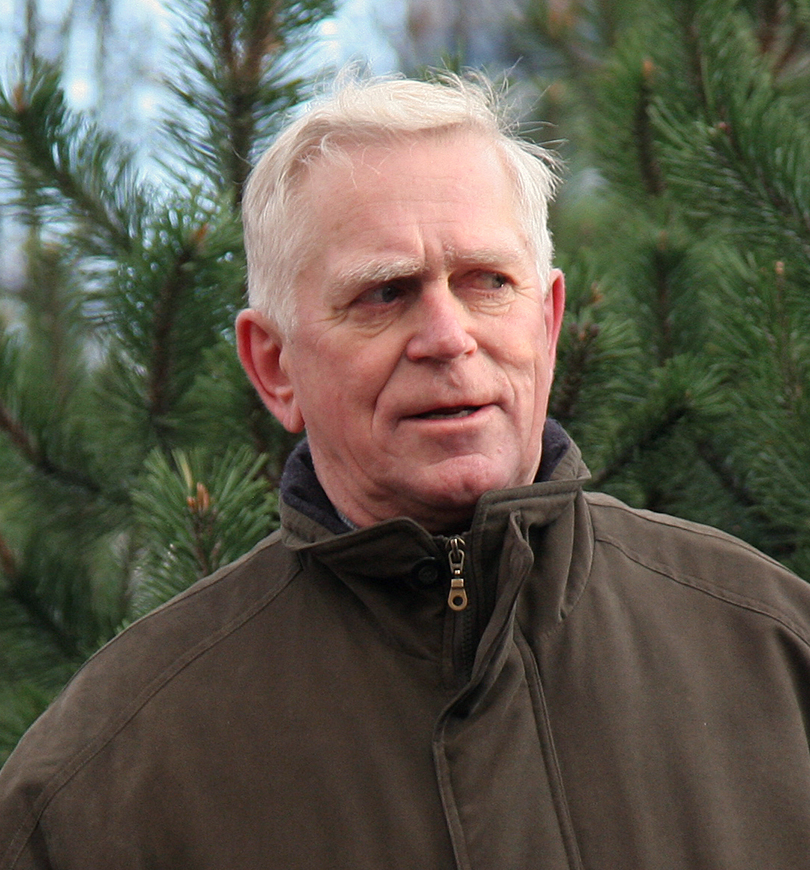
Nominee	Arnold Rüütel	Toomas Savi	Peeter Tulviste
Party	People's Union	Reform	Pro Patria
First round	0	0	0
Second round	0	0	35
Third round	0	0	33
First electoral round	114	90	89
Second electoral round	186	155	0
Nominee	Peeter Kreitzberg	Andres Tarand
Party	Centre	Moderates
First round	40	38
Second round	36	0
Third round	33	0
First electoral round	72	0
Second electoral round	0	0
President before election
Lennart Meri
Pro Patria
Elected President
Arnold Rüütel
People's Union

Estonia's 2001 presidential election took place from August 27 to September 21, 2001. After three rounds of voting in the Riigikogu and two rounds of voting in the electoral college, Arnold Rüütel was elected president.

== Voting in the Riigikogu ==
The first round in the Riigikogu took place at the extraordinary session on 27 August at 12.00. All members of the Riigikogu received ballots and 91 people took part. The number of blank ballots was 13. Peeter Kreitzberg received 40 votes and Andres Tarand 38 votes. As no two-thirds majority of the members of the Riigikogu voted in favor of any candidate, a second ballot was held on 28 August. New candidates were nominated before the second round.

In the second round, 99 members of the Riigikogu received ballots. 91 people took part. There was 1 invalid and 19 blank ballots. Peeter Kreitzberg received 36 votes and Peeter Tulviste received 35 votes.

As no candidate achieved the required two-thirds majority, a third round was held on the same day. 99 members of the Riigikogu received ballots, 90 members of the Riigikogu took part in the voting and there were 24 blank ballots. Peeter Kreitzberg received 33 votes and Peeter Tulviste received 33 votes.

=== Election results at the parliament ===
Candidate	First round	Second round	Third round
Peeter Tulviste	-	35	33
Peeter Kreitzberg	40	36	33
Andres Tarand	38	-	-
Invalid/blank votes	13	20	24
Abstentions	10	10	11
Total	101	101	101

== Voting in the Electoral College ==
The Electoral College consisted of 101 members of the Riigikogu and 266 representatives of local governments. The candidates who received the most votes in the previous round were Peeter Kreitzberg and Peeter Tulviste. New candidates can be nominated by any 21 members of the electoral college

The first round of voting took place on 21 September. The votes were as follows: Peeter Kreitzberg got 72, Arnold Rüütel got 114, Toomas Savi got 90 and Peeter Tulviste got 89 votes. As no candidate was voted in favor by a majority of the electoral college, a second round was held on 21 September with the participation of the two most successful candidates.

366 members of the electoral college took part in the voting. There were 2 invalid ballots and 23 blank ballots. Arnold Rüütel received 186 votes and Toomas Savi 155. As Arnold Rüütel received more than half of the votes of the members of the electoral college, he was elected President of Estonia.

=== Election results at the parliament ===
Candidate	First round	Second round
Arnold Rüütel	114	186
Toomas Savi	90	155
Peeter Tulviste	89	-
Peeter Kreitzberg	72	-
Invalid/blank votes	-	25
Abstentions	2	1
Total	367	367
