= Arnold Rüütel =

President of Estonia from 2001 to 2006

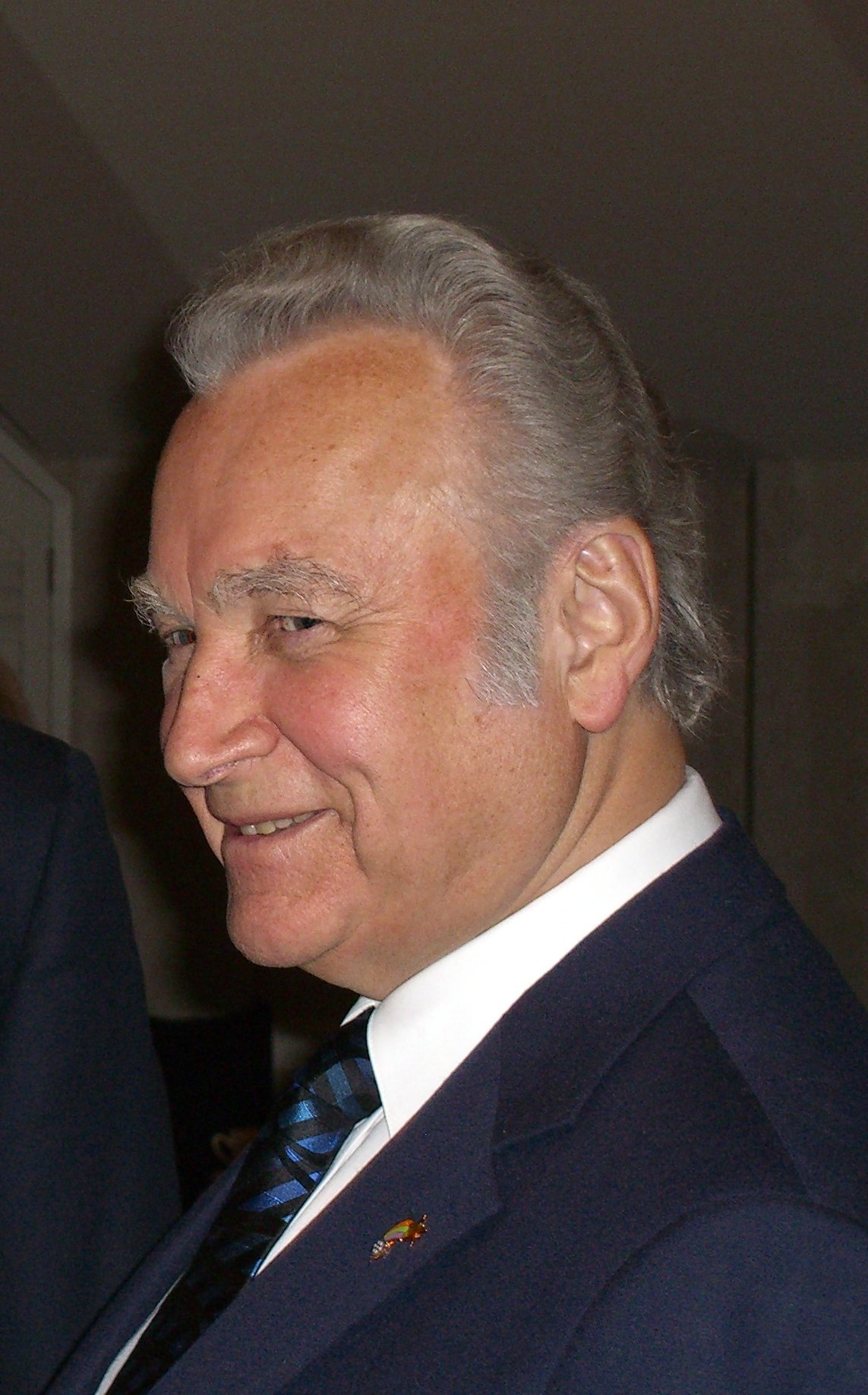
- Rüütel in 2006

3rd President of Estonia
- In office 8 October 2001 – 9 October 2006
- Prime Minister: Mart Laar; Siim Kallas; Juhan Parts; Andrus Ansip
- Preceded by: Lennart Meri
- Succeeded by: Toomas Hendrik Ilves

Chairman of the Supreme Council of Estonia
- In office 29 March 1990 – 5 October 1992; Estonian SSR: 29 March 1990 – 8 May 1990
- Prime Minister: Edgar Savisaar; Tiit Vähi
- Preceded by: Enn-Arno Sillari
- Succeeded by: Lennart Meri (as head of state); Ülo Nugis (as parliamentary speaker)

Chairman of the Presidium of the Supreme Soviet of the Estonian Soviet Socialist Republic
- In office 8 April 1983 – 29 March 1990
- Prime Minister: Valter Klauson; Bruno Saul; Indrek Toome
- First Secretary: Karl Vaino; Vaino Väljas
- Preceded by: Johannes Käbin
- Succeeded by: Himself (Chairman of the Supreme Council)

Personal details
- Born: 10 May 1928 Pahavalla, Saaremaa, Estonia
- Died: 31 December 2024 (aged 96) Tallinn, Estonia
- Party: Communist Party (until 1991); People's Union (1994–2001, 2007–2012); Independent (2001–2007); Conservative People's Party (2012–2024)
- Spouse: Ingrid Rüütel
- Children: 2
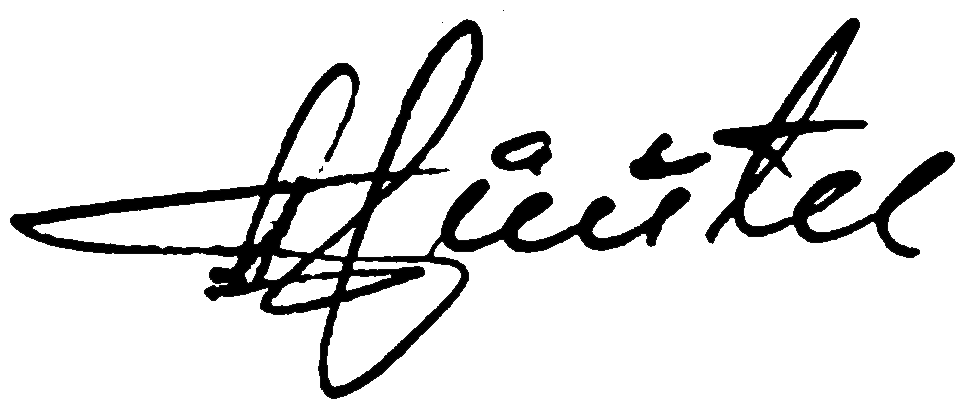
- Signature

Arnold Rüütel (Estonian pronunciation: [ˈɑrːnolʲtʲ ˈryːtːːelʲ], 10 May 1928 – 31 December 2024) was an Estonian politician. He was the third President of Estonia from 8 October 2001 to 9 October 2006. Rüütel was the second president of the country after the end of the 1944–1991 Soviet occupation, and the restoration of the independent Republic of Estonia on 20 August 1991.

== Biography ==
Rüütel was born in the village of Pahavalla in Laimjala Parish, Saaremaa, Estonia on 10 May 1928. His parents were Feodor Rüütel (1900−1965) and Juulia Rüütel (1905−1990). He graduated from the Agricultural College in Jäneda in 1949.

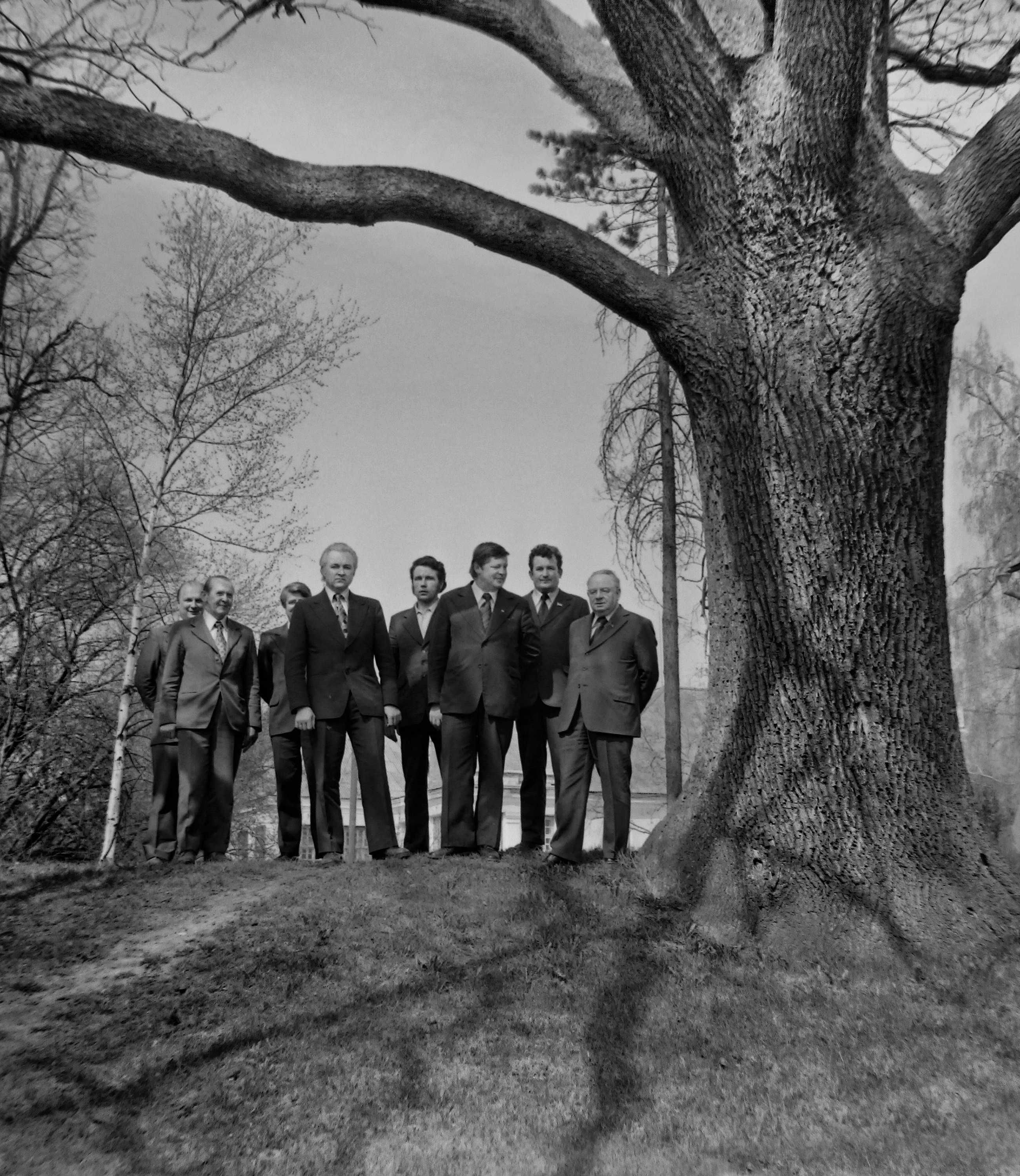
Rüütel with First Secretary Johannes Käbin and other party members at Vana-Antsla Manor Complex and Park in 1978.

He worked as a senior agronomist in Saaremaa (1949−1950) and then as a teacher at the Tartu School of Agricultural Mechanization (1955−1957). In between those two jobs, he served his term in the Soviet Army. In 1957, he was appointed the director of the experimental farm of the Research Institute of Veterinary Medicine and Animal Husbandry, and in 1963 he was appointed director of the Tartu Reference State Farm, remaining in this position until 1969. He graduated from the Estonian Academy of Agriculture in 1964. From 1969 to 1977, Rüütel was rector of the Estonian Academy of Agriculture. He served as the last chairman of the Presidium of the Supreme Soviet of the Estonian SSR (thus he was also one of the 15 deputy chairmen of the Supreme Soviet of the Soviet Union) from 8 April 1983 to 29 March 1990.

On 29 March 1990, he was elected Chairman of the Supreme Council (head of parliament), after the first free elections in the then Soviet-occupied Estonia. He served in that position when Estonia restored full independence on 20 August 1991, and continued in office until 6 October 1992. In the independent Estonia, Rüütel was also a member of the Constitutional Assembly from 1991 to 1992, which drafted the new Constitution of the Republic of Estonia. He stood as a candidate in the first presidential election in 1992. In the first round, Rüütel received the best result, 43% of popular vote, but still short of required 50% majority. The second round was held in the parliament (Riigikogu), and there Rüütel lost in the presidential elections to Lennart Meri.

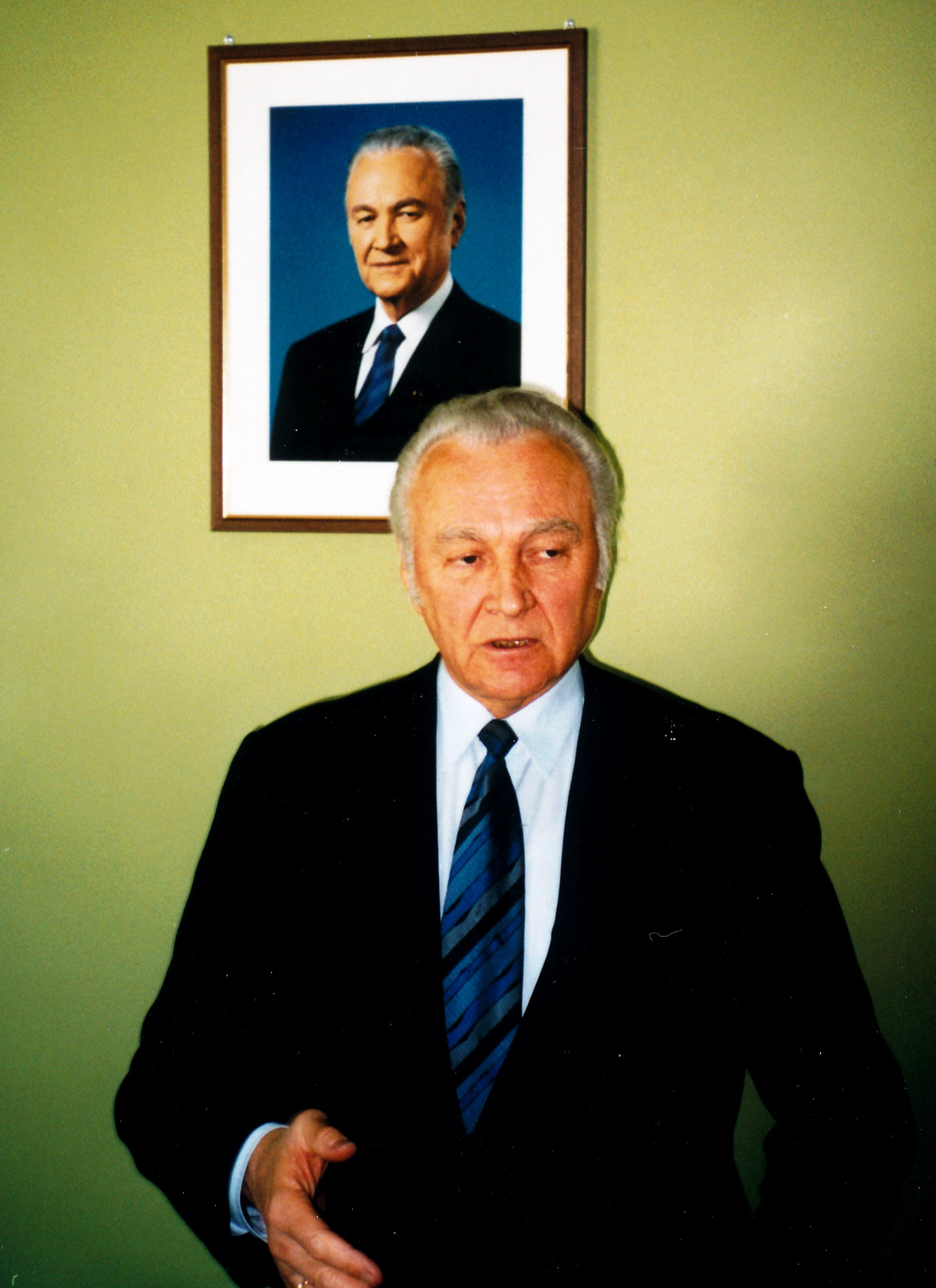
Rüütel at a border guards outpost.

In 1991, Rüütel took his Doctorate in agriculture. He served as Chairman of the People's Union of Estonia from 1994 to 2000, and was elected as a member of parliament (Riigikogu), in 1995, where he acted as vice-chairman until 1997. He ran for president in the 1996 election (this time an indirect election with no popular vote) and lost to Meri once again.

== Presidency ==
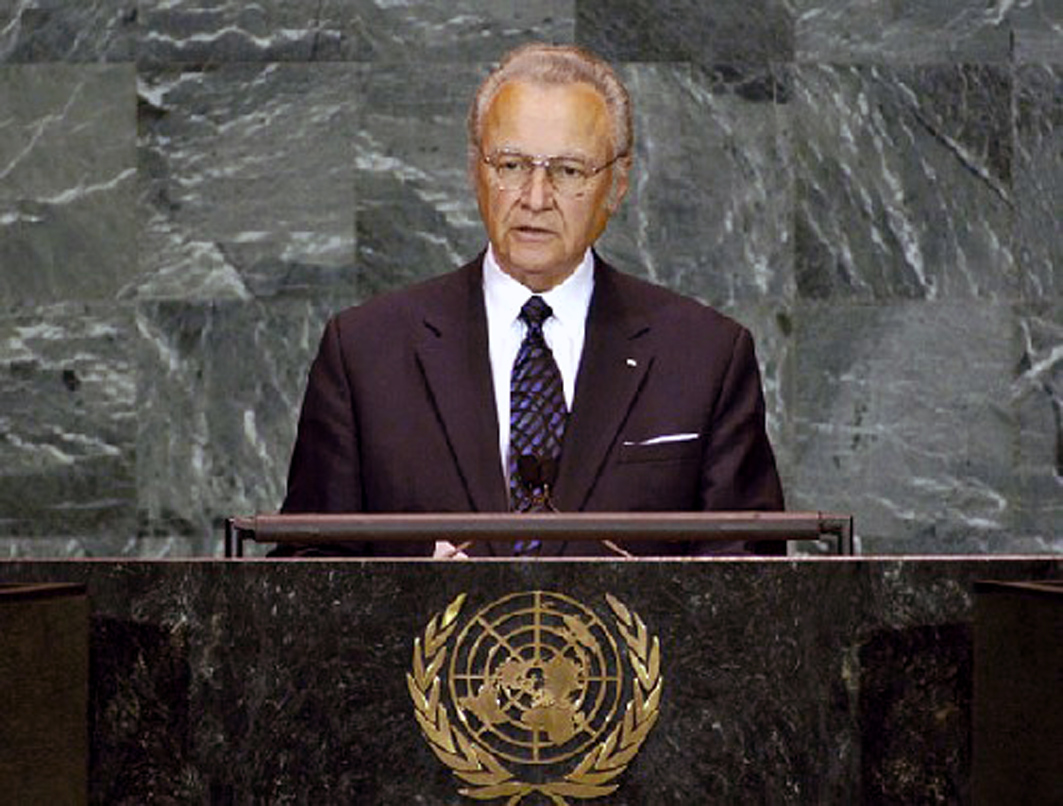
Rüütel at the United Nations.

Rüütel was elected president by an electoral college on 21 September 2001, defeating Toomas Savi in the final round by votes of 186 to 155. Rüütel was inaugurated as President of the Republic on 8 October 2001. Rüütel announced in his election manifesto that his principal aims would be to reduce the negative effects that Estonia's speedy economic changes had had on a large number of people, and to seek greater solidarity within the society.

List of diplomatic visits by Arnold Rüütel
City and Country	Dates	Notes
Warsaw, Poland	6 November 2001	Working visit.
Helsinki, Finland	20–21 November 2001	Official visit.
Vilnius, Lithuania	15 January 2002	Official visit.
Moscow, Russia	21 January 2005	Working visit.

The end of Rüütel's term was overshadowed by several controversies. At the Independence Day military parade on 24 February 2005, Rüütel repeatedly congratulated soldiers on "Victory day" (Estonian Victory Day is on 23 June), which caused speculation about the then 76-year-old president's mental health. In January 2006, Estonian Television reported that Rüütel's underage granddaughters had organized a party in the presidential palace and drunk alcohol. Later that year, the newspaper Eesti Ekspress published archived documents suggesting that Rüütel as a top functionary of the Estonian SSR was involved in the persecution of scientist Johannes Hint (later sentenced to jail in a show trial) by the KGB. Rüütel himself commented that he had tried to defend Hint.

As Rüütel's term was due to end in October 2006, he announced on 7 June 2006 that he would be a candidate for re-election, thus ending speculation as to his candidacy. In late August, the parliament failed to elect a President. The election of Ene Ergma and Toomas Hendrik Ilves by the parliament was blocked by Rüütel's supporters, who did not take out ballots. The electoral college met to vote for a president on 23 September. The latest opinion polls (September 2006) had suggested that Rüütel's popular support was around 31 per cent (Ilves' support was 51%); Rüütel was more popular amongst the elderly and the Russian-speaking minority. In the electoral college, Rüütel received 162 votes against 174 for Ilves. Rüütel's presidency therefore expired at the end of his term, and Ilves took office on 9 October 2006.

== Later activities ==
Rüütel voiced support for Mart Helme of the Conservative People's Party of Estonia in the 2016 Estonian presidential election. Since leaving office, he has continued to meet with his former counterparts, including Kazakh president Nursultan Nazarbayev and Moldovan president Petru Lucinschi.

On 26 June 2024, Rüütel left the Conservative People's Party of Estonia, with which he had been involved in its various forms for 30 years.

== Personal life and death ==
Rüütel was married to Ingrid Rüütel and had two daughters.

In his later years, Rüütel resided in Kadriorg. He died on 31 December 2024, at the age of 96. The government accorded him a state funeral on 11 January 2025. He was buried in Metsakalmistu.

== Awards ==
- Soviet Union: Order of the Badge of Honour (1965)
- Soviet Union: Order of Lenin (1971)
- Soviet Union: Order of Friendship of Peoples (1981)
- Soviet Union: Order of the Red Banner of Labour (1988)
- Estonia: Collar of the Order of the Cross of Terra Mariana (2001)
- Estonia: Collar of the Order of the National Coat of Arms (2008)
- Estonia: Order of the Tallinn Coat of Arms (2009)
- Finland: Grand Cross of the Order of the White Rose with collar (2001)
- Norway: Grand Cross of the Order of St. Olav (2002)
- Poland: Great Cross of the Order of the White Eagle
- Portugal: Grand Collar of the Order of Prince Henry (2003)
- Luxembourg: Great Cross of the Order of Adolphe of Nassau (2003)
- Iceland: Knight Grand Cross of the Order of the Falcon (2004)
- Slovakia: Grand Cross (or 1st Class) of the Order of the White Double Cross (2005)
- Portugal: Grand Collar of the Order of Saint James of the Sword (2006)
- Italy: Knight Grand Cross with Grand Cordon of the Order of Merit of the Italian Republic
- Latvia: Commander Grand Cross with Chain of the Order of the Three Stars
- Lithuania: Grand Cross with Golden Chain of the Order of Vytautas the Great (30 September 2004)
- Philippines: Gusi Peace Prize for Statesmanship (27 November 2013)

== Gallery ==
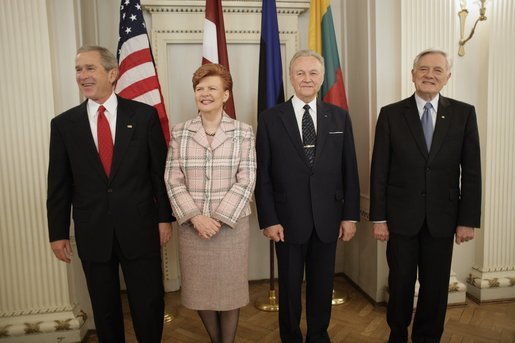
George W. Bush, Vaira Vīķe-Freiberga, Arnold Rüütel, and Valdas Adamkus in Riga, 7 May 2005.

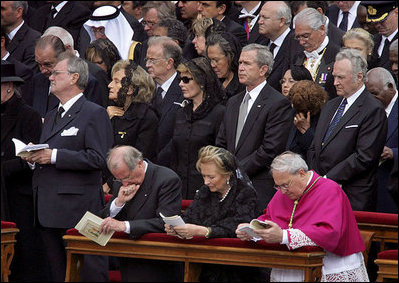
Rüütel with Albert II and Queen Paola of Belgium, Prince Henrik of Denmark, Bernadette Chirac, President Jorge Sampaio of Portugal, President George W. Bush and First Lady Laura Bush of the United States, and President Gloria Macapagal Arroyo of the Philippines at the funeral of John Paul II.

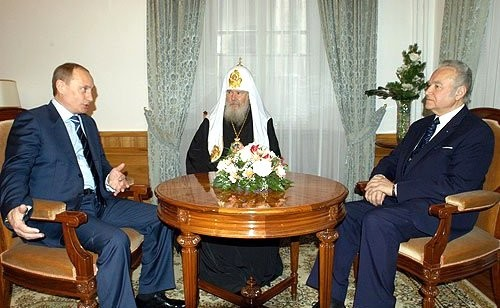
Arnold Rüütel with Vladimir Putin and Patriarch Alexy II in January 2005.

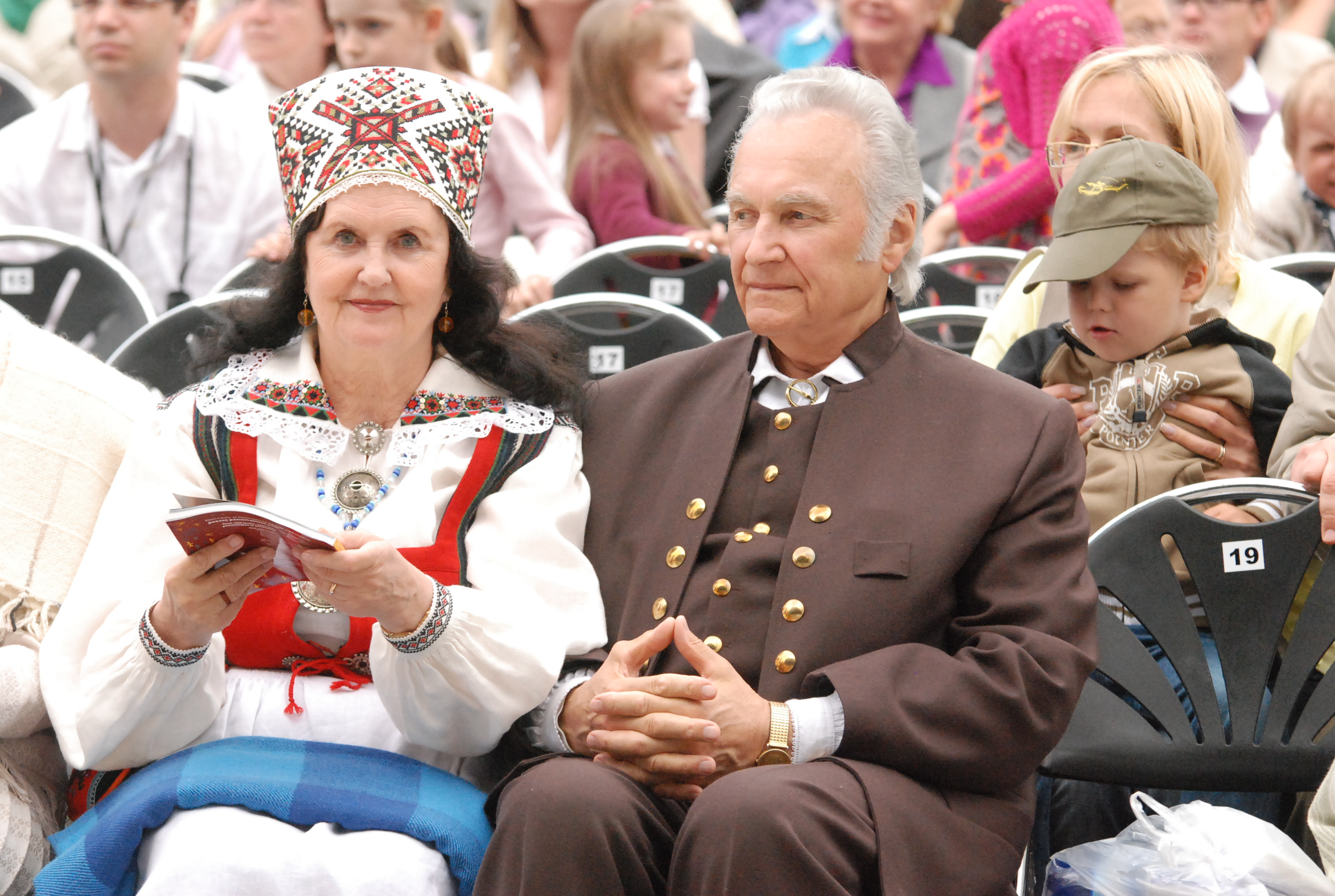
Arnold Rüütel and his wife Ingrid Rüütel at the XXV Estonian Song Festival (Laulupidu) in 2009.

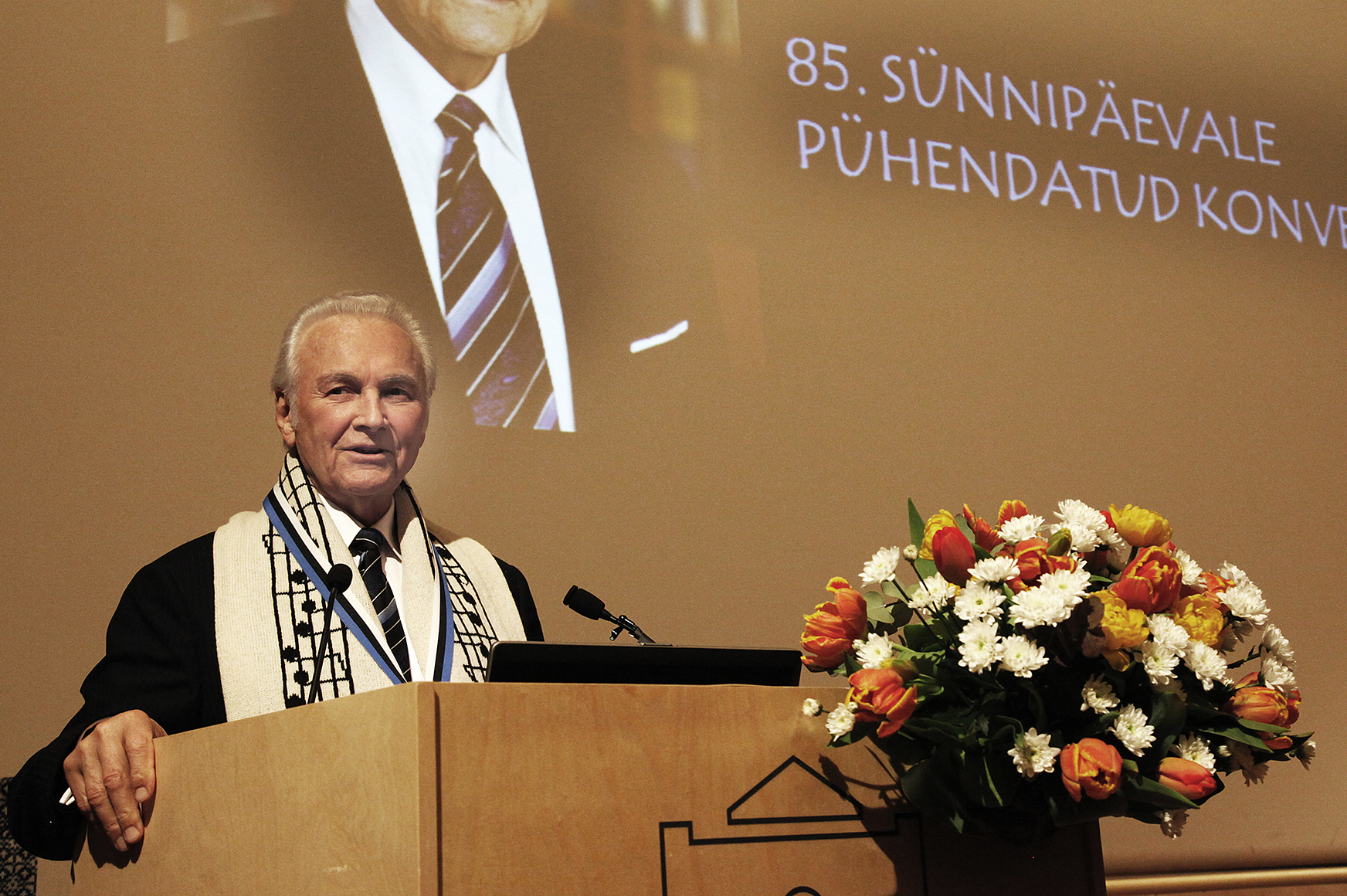
Conference dedicated to Arnold Rüütel in 2013

Political offices
Preceded by Johannes Käbin	Chairman of the Presidium of the Supreme Council of Estonian SSR; 1983–1990	Succeeded by Office abolished
Preceded by Lennart Meri	President of Estonia; 2001–2006	Succeeded by Toomas Hendrik Ilves
