= President of Estonia =

Head of state

President of the Republic of Estonia
- Presidential Standard

- Incumbent; Ülle Madise since 12 October 2026
- Style: Madam President (informal); Her Excellency (diplomatic)
- Type: Head of state
- Residence: Presidential Palace, Tallinn
- Appointer: Riigikogu / Electoral College (alternately until a candidate reaches the required majority)
- Term length: Five years, renewable once consecutively
- Constituting instrument: Constitution of Estonia (1992)
- Inaugural holder: Konstantin Päts
- Formation: 24 April 1938; 88 years ago
- Abolished: 1940–1991
- Deputy: Speaker of the Riigikogu
- Salary: €10,240 monthly
- Website: president.ee

The president of the Republic of Estonia (Estonian: Eesti Vabariigi President) is the head of state of the Republic of Estonia. The current president is Ülle Madise, elected by Parliament on 2 September 2026, replacing Alar Karis.

Estonia is one of the few parliamentary republics in which the president is a ceremonial figurehead without even nominal executive powers. The president is obliged to suspend their membership in any political party for the term in office. Upon assuming office, the authority and duties of the president in all other elected or appointed offices terminate automatically. These measures should theoretically help the president to function in a more independent and impartial manner. The president holds office for five years. They may be elected any number of times, but not more than twice consecutively.

In Estonia, the president is elected by the Riigikogu; a candidate must win a two-thirds supermajority to be elected. If no candidate achieves two-thirds support in the Riigikogu after three rounds of balloting, a special electoral body is convened comprising all members of the Riigikogu and elected representatives of all municipalities (at least one representative per each municipality, but not more than 10 representatives depending on the number of citizens with voting rights residing in the municipality). This body chooses between the two candidates with the largest percentage of votes.

While this election process has been criticised, the idea of direct elections does not have enough support in parliament, with only the Estonian Centre Party and Conservative People's Party defending it.

== History ==
The authors of the first Estonian constitution, with memories of the Russian emperors' abuses of power, tried to avoid concentrating too much power in one person's hands by all means possible. This eventually led to a creation of an ultra-parliamentary system. The power of the Parliament (Riigikogu) was practically unlimited. Until 1934, the nominal head of state was the State Elder, (riigivanem), who also served as de jure chairman of the cabinet—officially known as "the Government." However, he could not play a balancing role in the event of conflict between the Parliament and the Government. The State Elder and the Government were completely dependent on the Parliament and could be sacked by it at any time. The functions that are usually vested on a president in parliamentary systems were divided among the speaker of the Riigikogu, the State Elder and the Government.

Estonia's constitution was amended in 1933, instituting a strongly presidential system. The head of state, according to the new constitution, was also called the State Elder, but this time was vested with sweeping executive powers. However, it never came into effect as a result of Konstantin Päts's self-coup in 1934. In 1938, another constitution was enacted, and the head of state's title was changed to "President of the Republic." He was given very broad executive power, though he was somewhat less powerful than the State Elder of the 1933 constitution. Konstantin Päts became the first person to bear this title. His term was to last for six years.

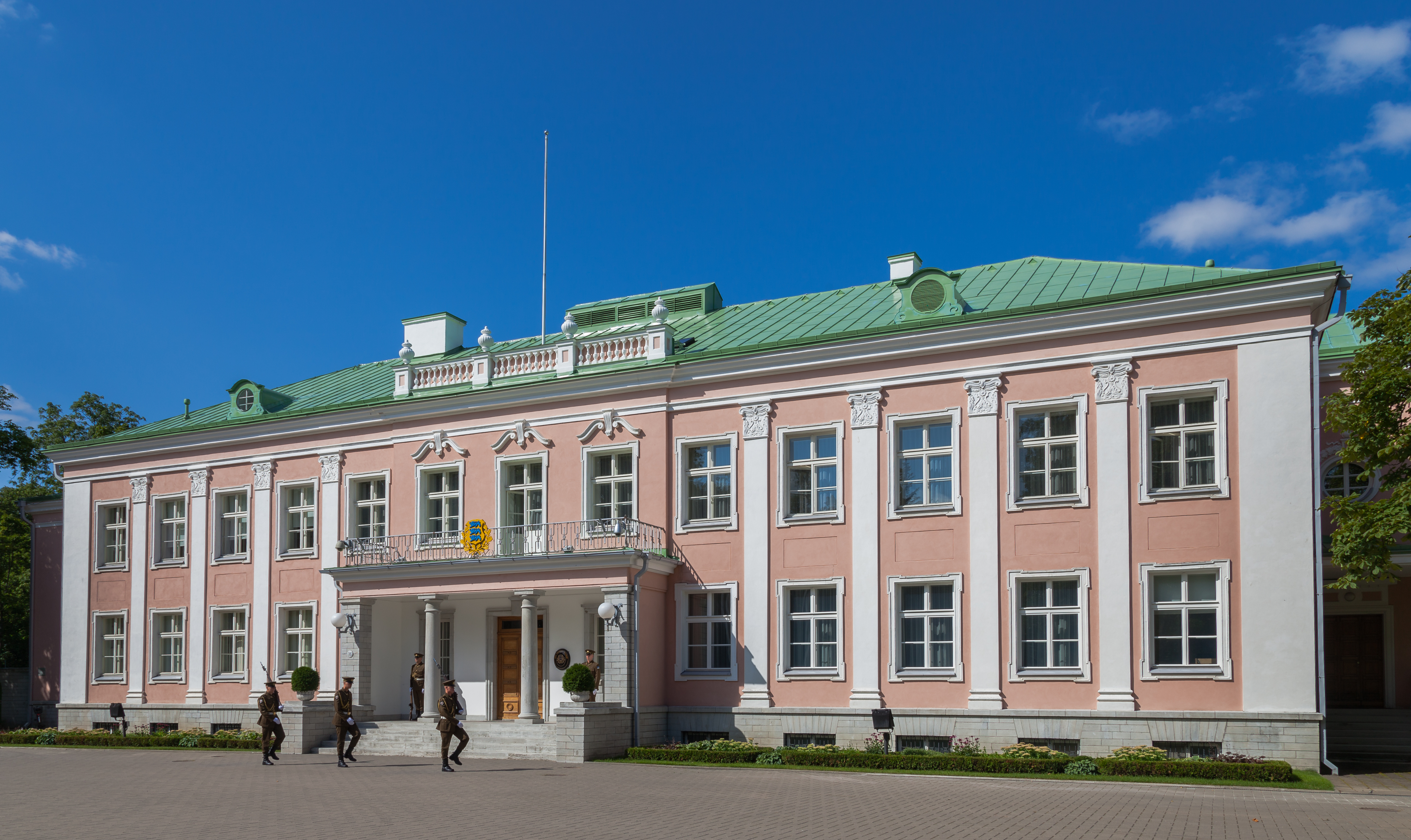
Estonia's Presidential Palace in Kadriorg Park

Within days after the Soviet military occupation of Estonia in June 1940, Päts was forced to appoint a Communist-dominated puppet government headed by Johannes Vares, following the arrival of demonstrators accompanied by Red Army troops with armored vehicles to the Presidential palace. The Vares government had actually been chosen by Soviet official Andrei Zhdanov. Following the sham elections in July, president Päts was dismissed from office. Later in July Päts, along with his son, daughter-in-law and two grandsons, was deported to Ufa in Russia.

According to the 1938 constitution, in case the president was ever incapacitated, or was otherwise unable to carry out his functions, his duties were to be assumed by the prime minister under the title "Prime Minister in duties of the President." Following this provision, Vares nominally took over the functions of the president for a few weeks during the Soviet occupation until Estonia was annexed and formally incorporated into the Soviet Union in August 1940. However, during times of war or incapacitation lasting longer than six months, the constitution provides for the election of an acting president by the Electoral Council. In a secret meeting on 20 April 1944, the Electoral Council determined that the appointment of Vares as prime minister in 1940 had been unlawful according to the 1938 constitution. The council elected Jüri Uluots as acting president on 21 April. Uluots appointed Otto Tief as prime minister. Tief was subsequently arrested by the re-occupying Soviet forces in September 1944.

In September 1944, Uluots and the surviving members of the Tief government escaped to Sweden. The day before Uluots died in January 1945, a successor, August Rei, was named to assume the position of acting president. Following Rei's death in 1963, the role passed to Aleksander Warma, then to Tõnis Kint in 1971, then to Heinrich Mark in 1990. In October 1992, Mark handed over his credentials to the newly elected president of the restored republic, Lennart Meri.

After Estonia regained independence, a new constitution was adopted in 1992 that was based on a mixture of the 1920 and 1938 documents. During the drafting of the new constitution, it was initially planned to use the older, more traditional title, State Elder, for the head of state. However, the more modern term "president" was eventually chosen after public consultations. Since the adoption of the 1992 constitution, seven presidential elections have taken place (in 1992, 1996, 2001, 2006, 2011, 2016, 2021). Lennart Meri was elected in 1992 (this election, unlike later ones, had a public round) and re-elected in 1996, defeating Arnold Rüütel both times. Rüütel himself became the next president in 2001. In 2006, Toomas Hendrik Ilves won the election in the electoral assembly, and he was reelected by the parliament in 2011. In 2016, Kersti Kaljulaid was elected president only after the parliament, and then the electoral assembly too, had failed to elect one, and the election had passed back to the parliament. Alar Karis was elected president by the parliament in 2021.

== Constitutional role ==
The president of the Republic of Estonia:

- acts as the highest representative of state in international affairs (this includes signing international treaties which have been preliminarily approved by the Government). In exceptional circumstances the president may represent Estonia in the European Council if the Prime Minister of Estonia is absent;
- appoints and recalls, upon proposal of the Government, the diplomatic representatives of the Republic of Estonia to foreign states and international organizations; receives the credentials of foreign diplomatic agents accredited to Estonia;
- declares regular elections of the Riigikogu (the parliament of Estonia) and, pursuant to respective provisions of the Constitution, its extraordinary elections. Extraordinary elections can be declared by the president at four occasions: if the Riigikogu turns out to be unable to pass the annual State Budget Act, if the Riigikogu fails to obtain the nation's approval on a referendum, if the Riigikogu fails to elect the Prime Minister after it receives the opportunity (at those three occasions announcing extraordinary elections is obligatory and the president simply acts as the "highest notary" of the state) or if the Riigikogu passes a censure motion against the Government, and the Government, in its turn, requests the president to consider announcing extraordinary elections (in this case the president may however decline if they find organizing extraordinary elections unnecessary or unreasonable for whatever reason);
- convenes the new membership of the Riigikogu and opens its first session;
- proposes to the chairperson of the Riigikogu to convene an extraordinary session of the Riigikogu (in case of necessity);
- promulgates laws and signs the instruments of ratification. The president may refuse to promulgate a bill into law within 14 days after its receipt (it is mostly done only if the president finds it contrary to the Constitution of Estonia). In this case the president returns the bill to the Riigikogu with a motivation of his (or her) decision. When that happens, the Riigikogu may reconsider and amend the bill according to remarks of the president, drop the matter, or pass the bill without any changes for a second time. When Riigikogu takes the third option, the president may not simply refuse to sign the bill into law anymore, but is obliged to promulgate it or, if they still believe it to be unconstitutional, to ask Riigikohus (the Supreme Court) to rule on its constitutionality. If Riigikohus finds no violation of constitution, the president must sign the bill into law.
- may initiate amendment of the Constitution. Until now this right has been used at two occasions only. President Lennart Meri proposed to introduce direct elections of the president and to found a Constitutional Court on the last day of his stay in office. This proposal did not find support within Parliament. President Toomas-Hendrik Ilves proposed to remove mentioning the institution of the commander and the Commander-in-Chief of the Defence Forces from the Constitution, so that they could be appointed by the Government, and not by Riigikogu. The respective amendment was finally approved by Riigikogu on 13 April 2011 and entered into force on 22 July 2011;
- nominates a candidate for the post of prime minister, after appropriate consultations with the parliamentary factions. This person is normally the leader of the parliamentary coalition or the largest party in the Riigikogu. The candidate then goes through an approval vote in the parliament. If the candidate nominated by the president fails to obtain parliamentary approval or finds himself to be incapable of forming the Government, the president may nominate another candidate. If the second candidate also fails to obtain the approval of the Parliament or if the president refuses to nominate a second candidate, the right to nominate the prime minister is transferred to Riigikogu;
- on the proposal of the prime-minister, formally appoints to office and dismisses members of the Government. The prime-minister's proposal is binding for the president. The president may not outright refuse to appoint or dismiss a minister with the prime minister's respective proposal. The president's role is this virtually limited to a formal signing of the respective documents;
- nominates the chairperson of the Supreme Court, the chairperson of the board of the Bank of Estonia, the auditor general and the Chancellor of Justice. The president may, theoretically, nominate any candidate at their discretion. However, the traditions of a parliamentary republic suppose that the president organizes respective consultations with the parliamentary fractions and proposes only such a candidate that will be able to secure the support of Riigikogu, for all of those officers must pass through an approval vote in the parliament before they can assume their office;
- upon proposal of the board of the Bank of Estonia, appoints to office the president of the Bank of Estonia. The president may refuse to accept the proposal and demand for another candidate (theoretically for an unlimited number of times). This option was previously exercised by President Lennart Meri.
- upon proposal of the Supreme Court, appoints judges (judges appointed by the president may be taken to legal responsibility only with the president's consent);
- confers state decorations, military and diplomatic ranks;
- is the Supreme Commander of the National Defence Forces of Estonia. In reality, this function is usually considered ceremonial; The Defence Forces are nominally commanded by the government's Ministry of Defence.
- makes proposals to the Riigikogu to declare martial law, to order mobilization and demobilization and to declare a state of emergency;
- declares martial law in case of attack on Estonia and orders mobilization;
- acts as the head of the State Defence Council, which is an advising body consisting of the president, the prime minister, the speaker of Riigikogu, the chairperson of the Riigikogu commissions for state defence and foreign affairs, minister of foreign affairs, minister of defence, finance minister, minister of internal affairs, minister of justice and commander of defence forces of Estonia;
- by way of clemency, releases or grants commutation to convicted offenders;
- initiates the bringing of criminal charges against the Chancellor of Justice.

Unlike their counterparts in other parliamentary republics, the president is not even the nominal chief executive. Rather, the Constitution explicitly vests executive power in the Government.

== List of presidents ==
No.	Portrait	Name	Took office	Left office	Party	Birth and death
1		Konstantin Päts	24 April 1938	23 July 1940	Non-party coalition	b. 23 February 1874, Tahkuranna d. 18 January 1956, Burashevo, Kalinin Oblast, USSR
1		Konstantin Päts	1938 – I round – elected by the Electoral Assembly (parliament and municipal appointees) with 219 of 238 votes (92.0%).			
2		Lennart Meri	6 October 1992	8 October 2001	Pro Patria National Coalition	b. 29 March 1929, Tallinn d. 14 March 2006, Tallinn
2		Lennart Meri	1992 – II round – elected by the parliament with 59 of 101 votes (58.4%). 1996 – V round – elected by the Electoral Assembly (parliament and municipal appointees) with 196 of 372 votes (52.7%).			
3		Arnold Rüütel	8 October 2001	9 October 2006	People's Union of Estonia	b. 10 May 1928, Laimjala Parish, Saare County d. 31 December 2024
3		Arnold Rüütel	2001 – V round – elected by the Electoral Assembly (parliament and municipal appointees) with 186 of 366 votes (50.8%).			
4		Toomas Hendrik Ilves	9 October 2006	10 October 2016	Social Democratic Party	b. 26 December 1953 Stockholm, Sweden
4		Toomas Hendrik Ilves	2006 – IV round – elected by the Electoral Assembly (parliament and municipal appointees) with 174 of 345 votes (50.4%). 2011 – I round – elected by the parliament with 73 of 101 votes (72.3%).			
5		Kersti Kaljulaid	10 October 2016	11 October 2021	Independent	b. 30 December 1969, Tartu
5		Kersti Kaljulaid	2016 – VI round – elected by the parliament with 81 of 101 votes (80.2%).			
6		Alar Karis	11 October 2021	12 October 2026	Independent	b. 26 March 1958, Tartu
6		Alar Karis	2021 – II round – elected by the parliament with 72 of 101 votes (71.3%).			
7		Ülle Madise	12 October 2026	-	Independent	b. 11 December 1974, Tartu
7		Ülle Madise	2026 – I round – elected by the parliament with 71 of 101 votes (70.3%).			

== See also ==
- Spouse of the president of Estonia
- Prime Minister of Estonia
- State Elder of Estonia
- Riigihoidja
- List of chairmen of the Presidium of the Supreme Soviet of the Estonian Soviet Socialist Republic ("head of state" during the Soviet era)
