= Ülo Nugis =

Estonian politician and economist

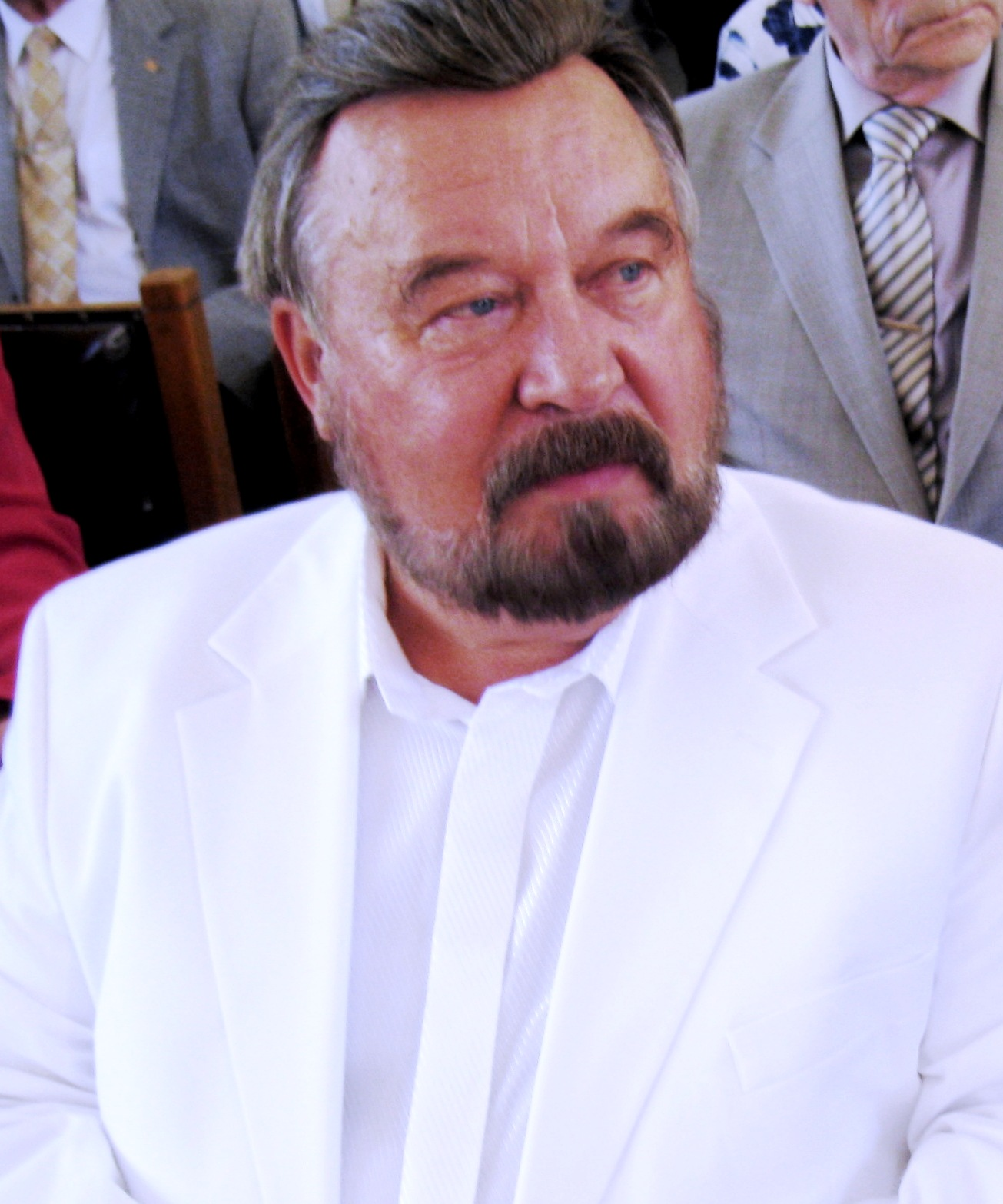
- Nugis in 2009

Speaker of Riigikogu
- In office 21 October 1992 – 21 March 1995
- Preceded by: Otto Pukk (Riigivolikogu); Mihkel Pung (Riiginõukogu)
- Succeeded by: Toomas Savi

Personal details
- Born: 28 April 1944 Tallinn, Estonia
- Died: 18 November 2011 (aged 67) Tallinn, Estonia
- Spouse: Vaike Nugis
- Children: 1

Ülo Nugis (28 April 1944 – 18 November 2011) was an Estonian politician and economist. As Speaker of the Supreme Council of Estonia on 20 August 1991, he presided over the Supreme Council's historic session when it voted for the restoration of Estonia's national independence from the Soviet Union.

== Early life ==
Ülo Nugis was born on 28 April 1944 in Tallinn. He studied at Tallinn Technical Secondary School for Building and Mechanics from 1958 to 1962, at Tallinn Polytechnic Institute from 1962 to 1965, and finally at Belarusian State Polytechnic Institute from 1965 to 1967 graduating in mechanical engineering.

== Career ==
Nugis worked as a teacher at Tallinn Technical Secondary School for Building and Mechanics from 1967 to 1968, and at various positions in the Pioneer and Tegur factories from 1968 to 1974. In 1974, Nugis became director of the building materials factory Ehitusdetail, and in 1980 director of a ski factory, Dünamo. In 1986, he became director of the Estoplast factory. Under his leadership, central Soviet Union control of Estoplast was transferred to local Estonian control in 1988. Together with other Estonian-minded industrial leaders, Nugis formed the Union of Work Collectives (Estonian: Eesti Töökollektiivide Liit) where he became the leader. Nugis was elected deputy of the Tallinn-Lenin national-territorial electoral district No. 449 of the Estonian SSR to the Congress of People's Deputies of the Soviet Union in March 1989.

In 1990, Nugis was elected to the Estonian Supreme Council at the first mostly free elections, becoming Speaker. That same year, he left the Communist Party and founded the Republican Coalition Party. On 20 August 1991, he presided over the Supreme Council's historic session where it voted to restore Estonia's national independence, with the gavel strike by Nugis confirming the result. In October, Nugis became the first Estonian politician to publicly state that the country should try to join NATO as soon as possible, even as Soviet troops were still present in the Baltic nation.

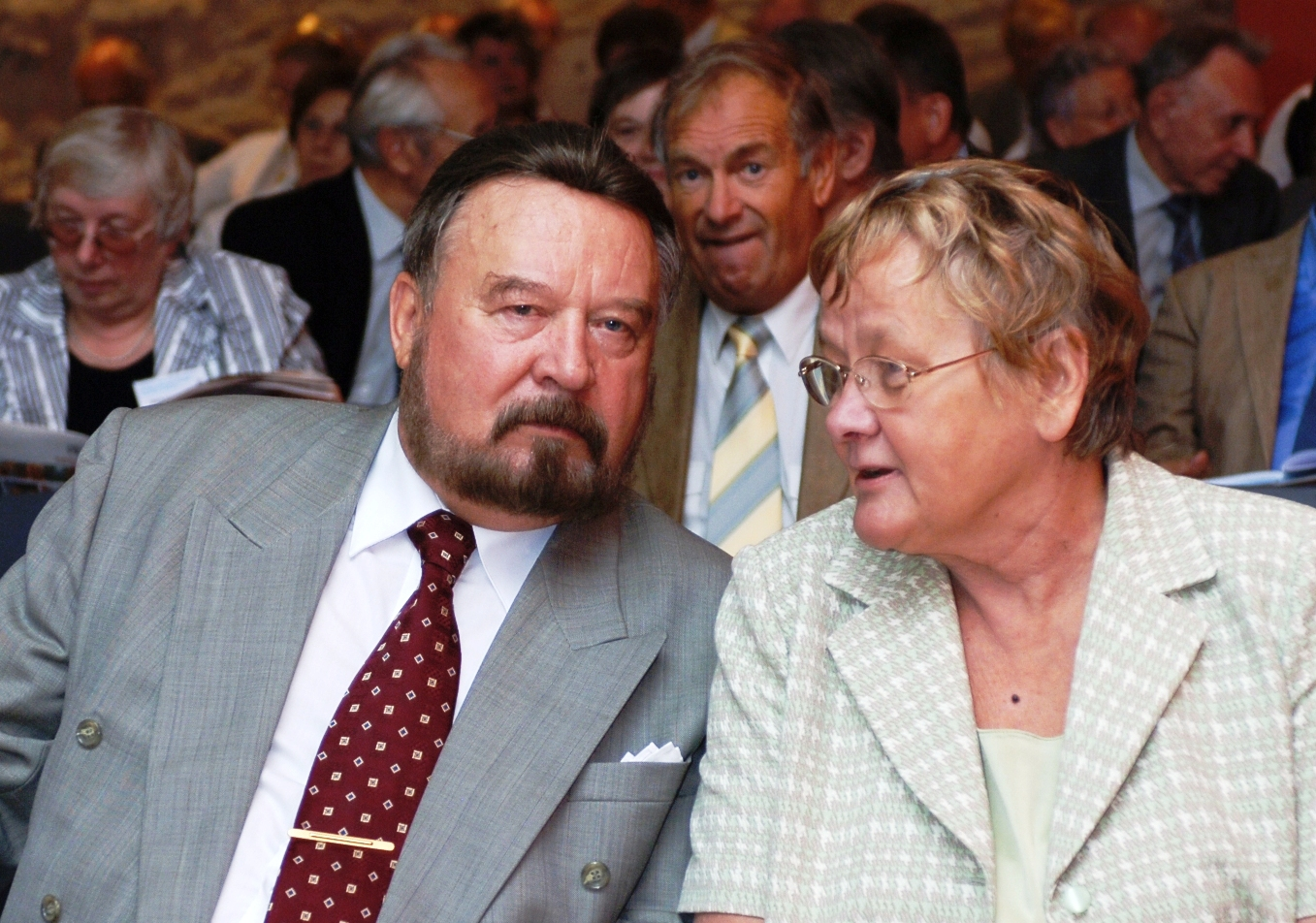
Nugis and Ene Ergma

In 1992 he became the speaker of the newly elected Riigikogu. Over the years he was in multiple different parties, including the Pro Patria National Coalition Party, People's Party of Republicans and Conservatives, and the Estonian Coalition Party. After splitting from the latter, he created the New Estonia party, which he led from 2001 to 2003 before merging it into the People's Union of Estonia. At the same year Nugis retired from politics.

Nugis was a member of the 20 August Club which is an organization that is composed of the former members of the Supreme Council who had voted for the restoration of Estonian independence.

== Personal life ==
Nugis and his wife, Vaike, had a son, Uno.

== Death ==
Nugis died on 18 November 2011. The funeral at Charles' Church in Tallinn was attended by Estonian presidents Toomas Hendrik Ilves and Arnold Rüütel, among others. The coffin was covered with the Estonian flag that had flown over Pikk Hermann on 20 August that year. Nugis was buried at Metsakalmistu cemetery.

== Awards ==
Nugis was awarded Order of the National Coat of Arms 4th class in 2001 and 2nd class in 2004, and memorial medal “10 years of restoration of the Defence Forces” in 2001.

Political offices
In abeyance during Soviet era Title last held by Otto Pukk & Mihkel Pung as Speaker (Riigivolikogu) & Speaker (Riiginõukogu)	Speaker of the Riigikogu; 1992–1995	Succeeded by Toomas Savi
