= Jaak Aaviksoo =

Estonian politician and physicist

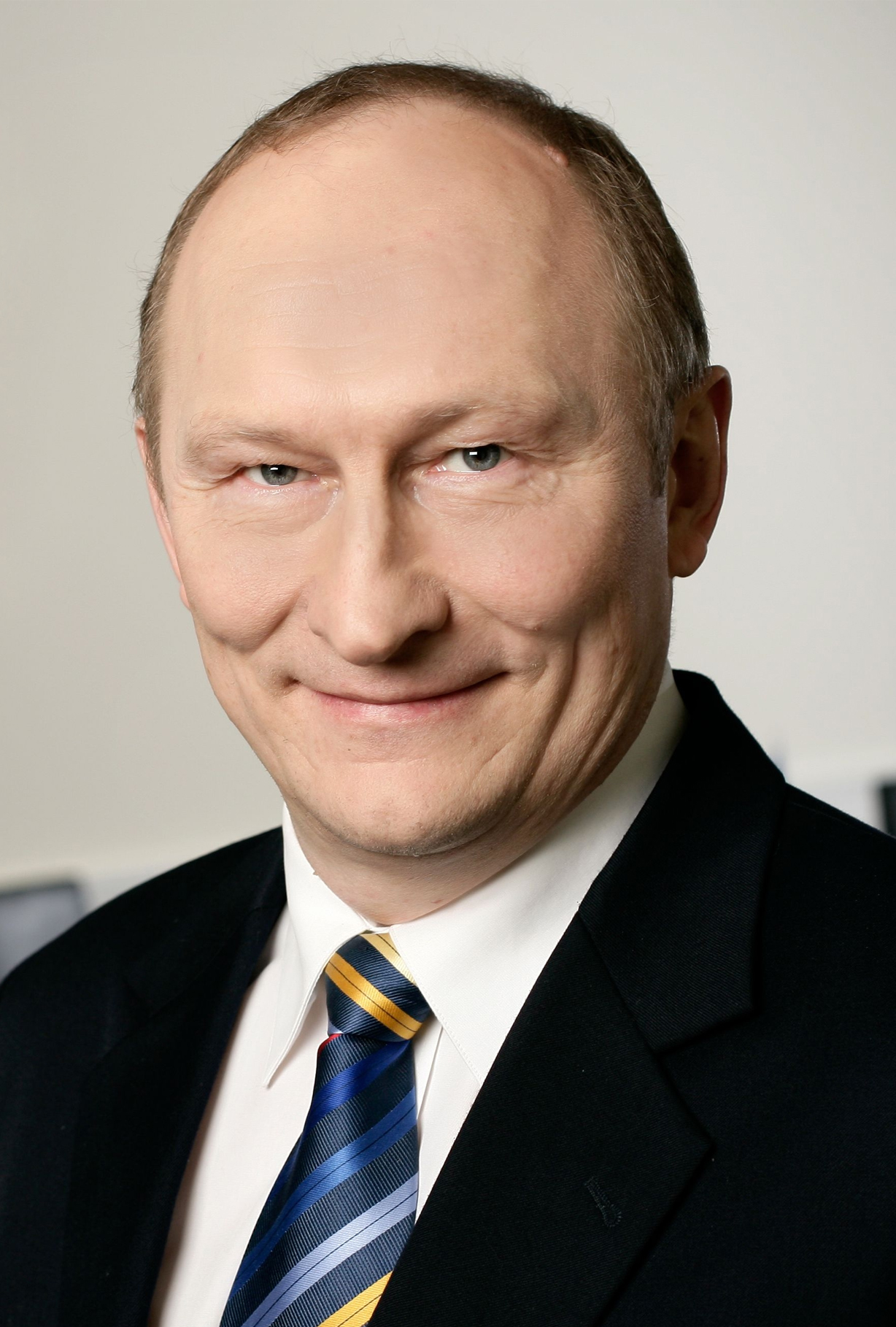

Minister of Culture and Education
- In office 1995–1996
- Prime Minister: Tiit Vähi
- Preceded by: Peeter Kreitzberg
- Succeeded by: Rein Loik (as Minister of Education); Jaak Allik (as Minister of Culture)

Minister of Defence
- In office 2007–2011
- Prime Minister: Andrus Ansip
- Preceded by: Jürgen Ligi
- Succeeded by: Mart Laar

Minister of Education and Research
- In office 6 April 2011 – 26 March 2014
- Prime Minister: Andrus Ansip
- Preceded by: Tõnis Lukas
- Succeeded by: Jevgeni Ossinovski

Personal details
- Born: 11 January 1954 (age 72) Tartu, then part of Estonian SSR, Soviet Union
- Party: Union of Pro Patria and Res Publica
- Spouse: Tiina Kaalep
- Education: University of Tartu
- Occupation: Rector of Tallinn University of Technology (TalTech)
- Profession: Physicist

Jaak Aaviksoo (born 11 January 1954) is an Estonian politician and physicist, a former rector of the University of Tartu and Tallinn University of Technology (TalTech).

Aaviksoo has been the Estonian Minister of Defence and Minister of Education and Research, he was a member of the liberal conservative party Union of Pro Patria and Res Publica.

Jaak Aaviksoo is the first rector in Estonia who is also an academician.

== Education and career in science ==
Aaviksoo was born in Tartu. After graduating from Tartu Secondary School No. 2 (present-day Miina Härma Gymnasium) in 1971, he entered the Tartu State University physics department in the chemistry-physics faculty and graduated cum laude in the field of theoretical physics in 1976. From 1976 to 1992 he was first junior, then senior and then leading scientist at the Physics Institute of the Estonian Academy of Sciences (named Academy of Sciences of the Estonian SSR until 1988). There he also became a PhD in physics (Thesis: "On Resonant Secondary Emission in Sodium Nitrite and Anthracene") in 1981. Aaviksoo was the first president of the Estonian Physical Society, founded in 1989. In 1992 he returned to University of Tartu, this time as a professor of optics and spectroscopy. In 1995 he was the acting director of the Tartu University institute of experimental physics and technology and from 1992 to 1995 also the first vice-rector of University of Tartu. He became a member of the Estonian Academy of Sciences and thus an academician in 1994. From 1981 to 1994 Aaviksoo worked in many foreign institutes as a guest professor, namely the Novosibirsk Institute of Thermal Physics, the Max Planck Institute for Solid State Research in Stuttgart, Osaka University and University of Paris VII: Denis Diderot.

== Politician and rector of University of Tartu and TalTech ==
From November 1995 to January 1996 Jaak Aaviksoo was Minister of Culture and Education and from then to November 1997 he was the Estonian Minister of Education in the governments of Tiit Vähi.

In 1998 he became the rector of University of Tartu. He was re-elected for another five-year term as a rector in 2003.

In 2006 Jaak Aaviksoo announced that he would be leaving the post of rector of University of Tartu to run for a seat in the Estonian parliament Riigikogu in the 2007 elections as a member of the liberal conservative Union of Pro Patria and Res Publica. Before joining the party and leaving his post as rector, Aaviksoo was considered as a candidate for the presidential elections in 2006, which were won by Toomas Hendrik Ilves. After already having joined Union of Pro Patria and Res Publica, Aaviksoo sought to become the party's leader for the 2007 parliamentary elections and candidate for Prime Minister of Estonia, but lost a closely contested duel within the party to internationally renowned two-time former Prime Minister Mart Laar.

In the elections he gained 4241 votes in his district and was elected to Riigikogu. He then became the Minister of Defence in Andrus Ansip's second government. Having assumed office on 5 April 2007, his first primary goals as Minister of Defence were restructuring the power management of the Estonian Defense Forces and dealing with the situation of the Bronze Soldier of Tallinn, a Soviet war monument, which was moved to a cemetery, causing much controversy and ethnic tension between a large part of the Estonian population and local Russians. He also saw the Estonian youth's weak desire to defend their country as a serious problem.

In 2011 he was re-elected to parliament and he became the Minister of Education and Research in Andrus Ansip's third government. As the Minister he strongly supported school reform and separating primary schools from gymnasiums.

In March 2015 he gained 1405 votes at the parliament elections and became a member in Riigikogu. In the summer of 2015 he ran for the position of the rector of Tallinn University of Technology.

Since September 2015 Jaak Aaviksoo has been the rector of Tallinn University of Technology (TalTech).

== Personal life ==
Aaviksoo is married to Tiina Kaalep. He is a father of three, a grandfather of seven and a great-grandfather of one.

He speaks fluent English, German, Russian and French on an average level.

== Works ==
Aaviksoo has published over 100 scientific articles and over 80 other publications from 1976 to 2002. His more important publications from the past decade are:

- J. Aaviksoo, C. Gourdon, R. Grousson, P. Lavallard, "Photoluminescence quantum yield in GaAs/AlAs superlattices", Solid State Electronics (vol. 40, no 1–8, p. 687, 1996)
- J. Aaviksoo, C. Gourdon, P. Lavallard, "Power nonlinearities in the luminescence spectrum of GaAs/AlAs superlattices", Solid State Communications (vol. 99, no 6, p. 387, 1996)
- S. O. Kognovitskii, V. V. Travnikov, J. Aaviksoo, I. Reimand, "Light Scattering by electrons in the absorption region of GaAs" – Phys. Solid State (vol. 39, no. 6, p. 907, 1997)
- I. Reimand, J. Aaviksoo, "Exciton interaction with hot electrons in GaAs", Technical digest of X International Conference on Ultrafast Phenomena in Spectroscopy, (Tartu, 1997, p. 82)
- J. Aaviksoo, "Estonian physicist: Active and productive", Science (vol. 275, no 5299, p. 463)
- J. Aaviksoo. Priorities for Higher Education in Central and Eastern European Countries. – Higher Education Management (vol. 9, no. 2, p. 19, 1997).
- I. Reimand, J. Aaviksoo, "Exciton interaction with hot electrons in GaAs", Phys. Rev. B 61, 2000, no 24, p 16653–16658
- J.Aaviksoo, J.Kuhl, K.Ploog, Observation of optical precursors at pulse propagation in GaAs. – Phys. Rev. A, 44, 25353–25356, 1991.
- I.Reimand, J.Aaviksoo, Surface polarization dynamics revealed by time-resolved resonant reflection of light. – Opt. Commun., 86(2) 142–146, 1991.
- J.Aaviksoo, I.Reimand, V.V.Rossin, V.V.Travnikov, Quenching of exciton luminescence by hot electrons in GaAs. – Fiz. Tverd. Tela, 33(8) 2408–2412, 1991. (in Russian).
- J.Aaviksoo, I.Reimand, V.V.Rossin, V.V.Travnikov, Kinetics of free exciton luminescence in GaAs. – Phys. Rev. B, 45(3) 1473–1476, 1992.
- T.Reinot, J.Aaviksoo, Propagation of polariton luminescence pulses in anthracene. – J. Lumin., 50(2) 259–264, 1991.
- J.Aaviksoo, T.Reinot, Ballistic propagation of luminescence pulses in anthracene crystal flakes. – J. Mol. Cryst. Liquid Cryst., 217, 147–151, 1992.
- J.Aaviksoo, I.Reimand, V.Rossin, V.Travnikov, Kinetics of exciton formation and relaxation in GaAs. – J. Lumin., 53, 423–426, 1992.
- J.Aaviksoo Estonian physicist: Active and Productive. – Science, 275, 463, 1997.

== Honors ==
- Member of the Academy of Sciences of Estonia (1994)
- Order of the National Coat of Arms, class IV, of the Republic of Estonia (2000)
- Grand Cross of the Order of Merit of the Federal Republic of Germany (2000)
- Medal of the University of Tokyo (2000)
- The Medal of the City of Tartu (2002)
- Honorary Doctor of the University of Turku (2003)
- Member of Academia Europaea (2004)
- Order of the White Star, class II, of the Republic of Estonia (2006)
- Order of the White Rose of Finland (2006)
- Cross of Merit of the Estonian Evangelical Lutheran Church, III class (2007)
- Order of Merit of France (2007)
- Order of the Three Stars of the Republic of Latvia (2009)
- Estonian Defence League White Cross, I class (2011)
- Honorary Doctor of the University of Lapland (2012)
- University of Tartu Grand Medal (2025)

Political offices
Preceded by Peeter Kreitzberg	Minister of Culture and Education; 1995–1996	Succeeded by Jaak Allik as Minister of Culture
Preceded by Peeter Kreitzberg	Minister of Culture and Education; 1995–1996	Succeeded by Jaak Aaviksoo as Minister of Education
Preceded by Jaak Aaviksoo	Minister of Education; 1996	Succeeded by Rein Loik
Preceded by Peeter Tulviste	Rector of University of Tartu; 1998–2006	Succeeded by Tõnu Lehtsaar (acting)
Preceded by Jürgen Ligi	Minister of Defence; 2007–2011	Succeeded by Mart Laar
Preceded by Tõnis Lukas	Minister of Education and Research; 2011–2014	Succeeded by Jevgeni Ossinovski
Preceded by Andres Keevallik	Rector of Tallinn University of Technology; 2015–2020	Succeeded by Tiit Land
