= Peeter Kreitzberg =

Estonian politician (1948–2011)

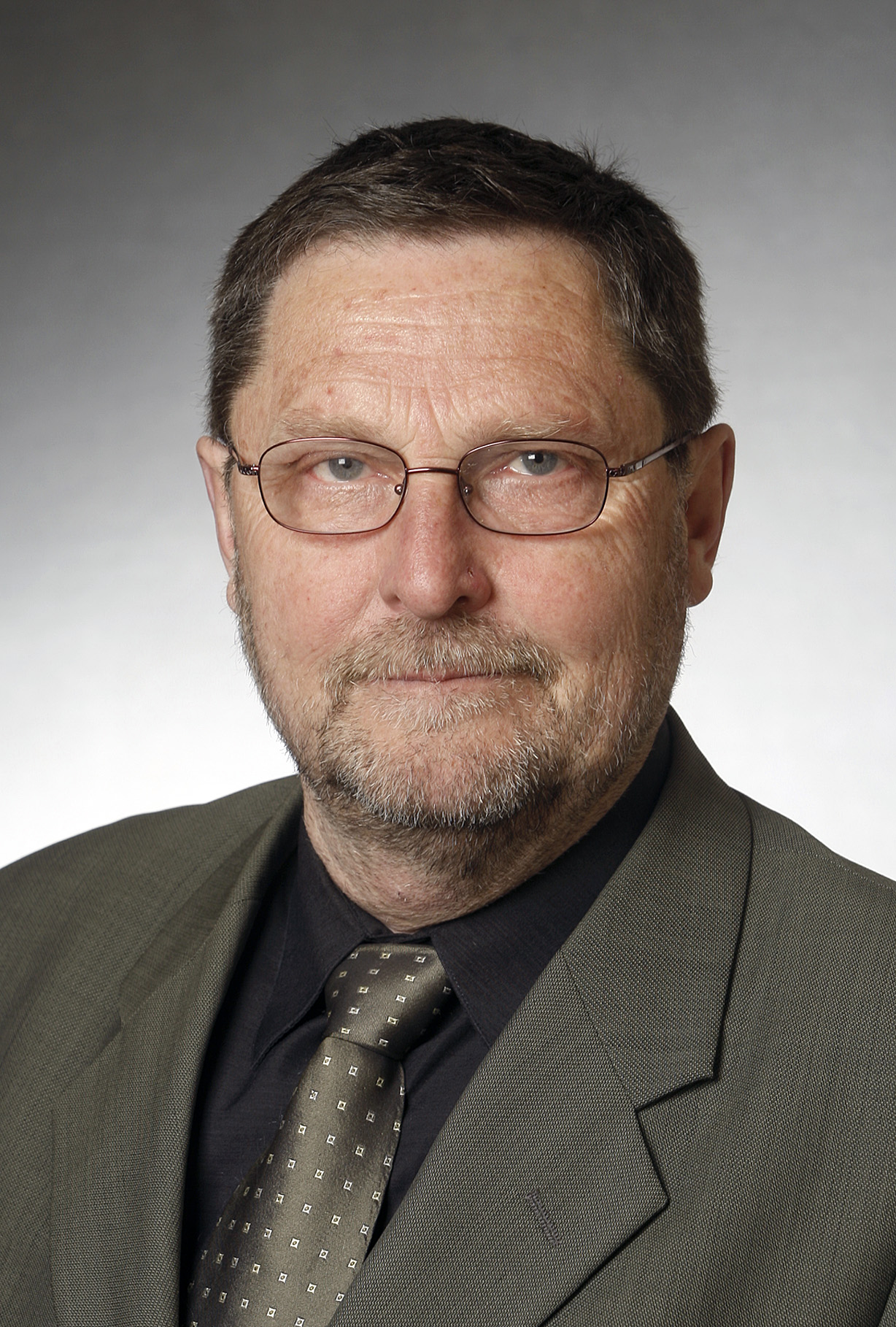
- Peeter Kreitzberg in 2011.

Minister of Culture and Education
- In office April 1995 – November 1995
- Prime Minister: Tiit Vähi
- Preceded by: Peeter Olesk
- Succeeded by: Jaak Allik (culture); Jaak Aaviksoo (education)

Personal details
- Born: 14 December 1948 Pärnu, then part of Estonian SSR, Soviet Union
- Died: 3 November 2011 (aged 62) Beijing, China
- Party: Social Democratic Party

Peeter Kreitzberg (14 December 1948 – 3 November 2011) was an Estonian politician, member of parliament and a member of the Social Democratic Party. Kreitzberg served as the Estonian Minister of Culture and Education from April to November 1995. He also taught at Tallinn University from 1997 to 2011.

Kreitzberg next served as the deputy mayor of Tallinn, the Estonian capital, from 1996 to 1999. He was elected to the Riigikogu, the nation's unicameral parliament, in 1999. He remained a member of parliament until his death in 2011. Kreitzberg served as the deputy chairman of the Riigikogu for two different tenures, from 2001 to 2003 and again from 2003 to 2005. He was also a candidate for President of Estonia in 2001.

Peeter Kreitzberg departed Estonia in October 2011 for an official visit to China, which was scheduled to last from 28 October to 4 November. He was accompanied by three other parliamentarians in the delegation — Kalev Kallo, Maret Maripuu and Sven Sester. Kreitzberg died in his Chinese hotel during the official visit on 3 November 2011, at the age of 62.

Preceded by Peeter Olesk	Estonian Minister of Culture and Education; 1995	Succeeded by Jaak Allik (Minister of Culture); Jaak Aaviksoo (Minister of Education)
