= Enn Tõugu =

Estonian computer scientist and mathematician (1935–2020)

Interview with Enn Tõugu in 2019

Enn Tõugu (20 May 1935 in Tallinn – 30 March 2020) was an Estonian computer scientist and mathematician. He dealt with system programming, declarative languages and topics related to artificial intelligence.

In 1960s, he focused on the design and construction of the original STEM mini computer (:et).

He was a candidate in 1996 Estonian presidential election.

== Awards ==
- 1987 State Prize of the USSR
- 1995 the Medal of the Estonian Academy of Sciences
- 2001 Order of the White Star, III class
