= 2006 Estonian presidential election =

← 2001	28 August - 23 September 2006	2011 →
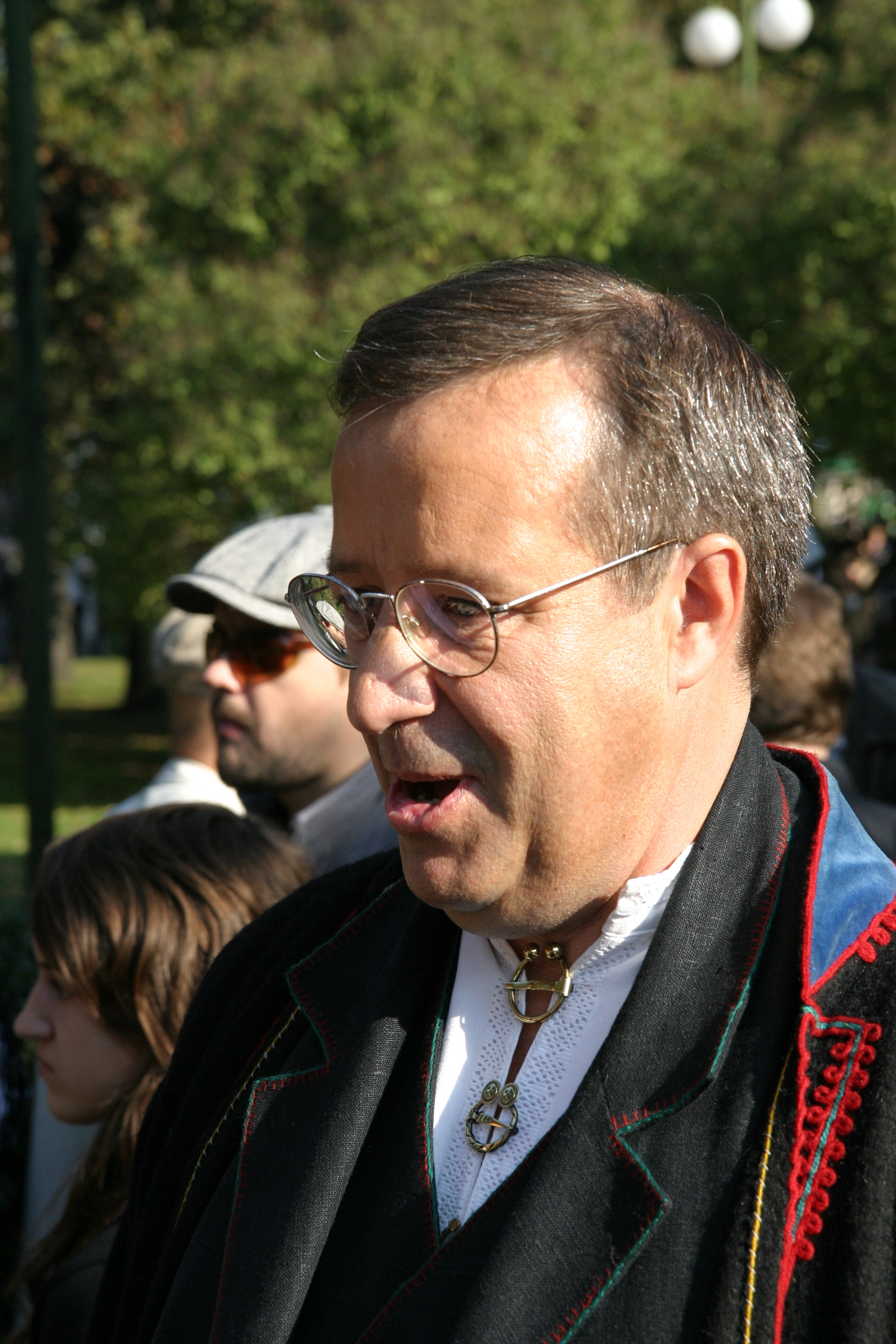

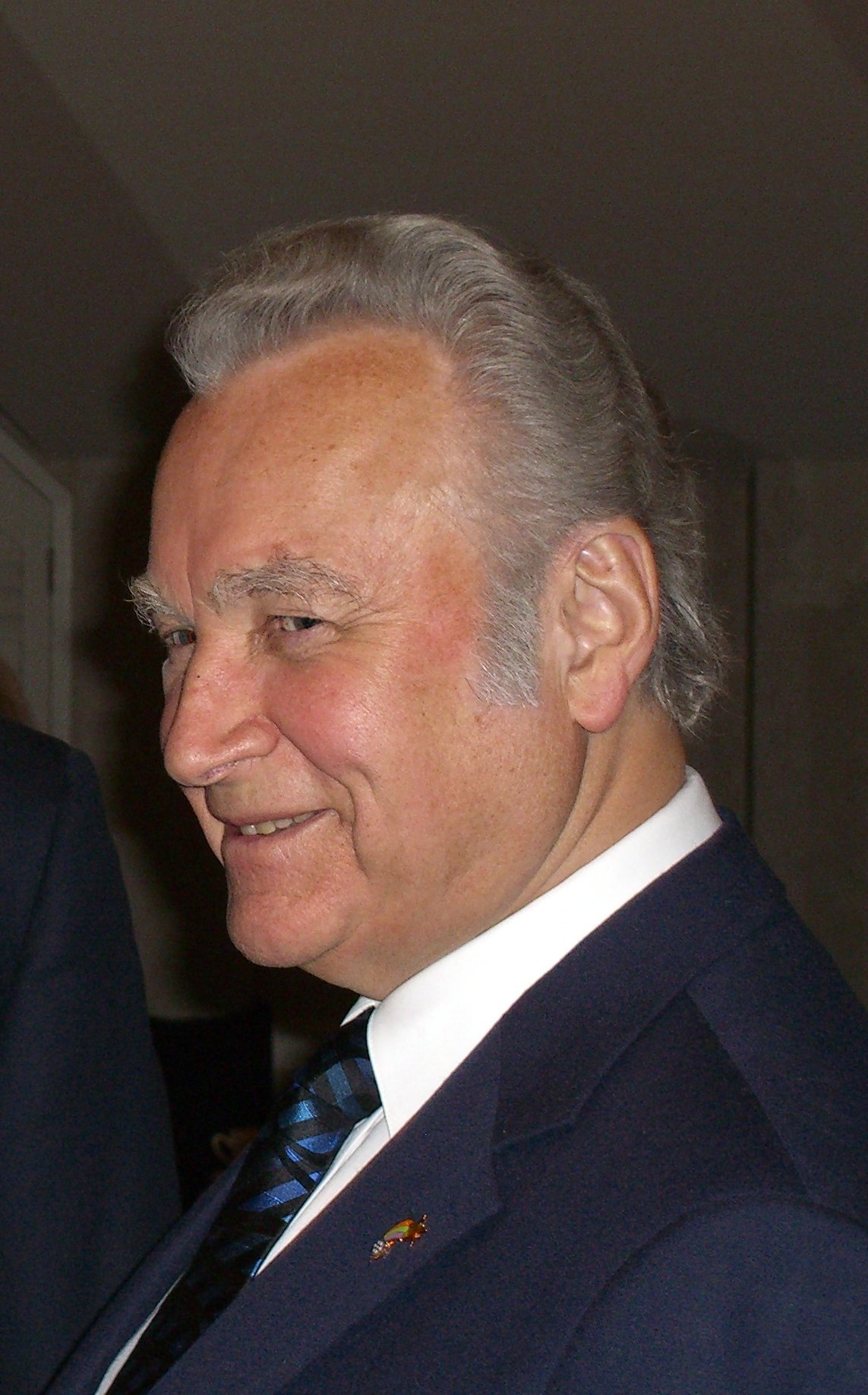

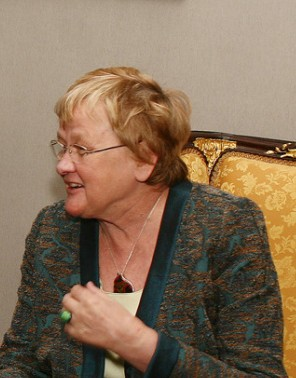
Nominee	Toomas Hendrik Ilves	Arnold Rüütel	Ene Ergma
Party	Social Democratic Party	Independent	IRL
First round	0	0	65
Second round	64	0	0
Third round	64	0	0
First electoral round	174	162	0
Nominators	Reform, Social Democratic, IRL	People's Union, Centre	IRL
President before election
Arnold Rüütel
People's Union
Elected President
Toomas Hendrik Ilves
Social Democratic

Estonian presidential elections, 2006 took place over four rounds, which were held on 28 and 29 August, and 23 September 2006. The first three rounds of the presidential election were held within the Riigikogu, which is Estonia's Parliament, as specified under electoral law. The two top candidates, Ene Ergma and Toomas Hendrik Ilves, were not elected because they did not obtain the required two-thirds of the votes in the Riigikogu.

As the Riigikogu was unable to make a decision within the first three rounds, it was required under Estonian electoral law to convene an electoral college to decide the presidency. It was convened on 23 September, and Toomas Hendrik Ilves emerged as the winner over the other candidate and incumbent president, Arnold Rüütel, after obtaining a majority of the votes in the electoral college.

== Electoral system ==
The President of the Republic of Estonia is indirectly elected, and serves primarily to represent the country as the symbolic Head of State of the executive branch. The president is elected for a five-year term and cannot stand for more than two consecutive terms. Any Estonian citizen by birth over the age of forty can be nominated as a candidate, but must be supported by a minimum of one fifth of the Riigikogu, equivalent to 21 members.

The President of the Republic Election Act, which was passed on April 10, 1996, governs the election process. There are up to five rounds of elections. In the first round, members of the Riigikogu vote for the new president; a candidate receiving a two-thirds majority of votes is elected. If no candidate receives the required majority, a second round of voting is held the next day. If no candidate receives the required majority during the second round, a third round of voting is held on the same day in which the two candidates who earned the most votes in the second round compete for a two-thirds majority.

If neither candidate receives the required majority during the third round, the President of the Riigikogu convenes an electoral college composed of the members of the Riigikogu as well as representatives from local government councils to choose the new president. Each local government council elects their own representatives, and the number of representatives from each community depends on population. In the 2006 election, the electoral college contained 347 people: 101 Riigikogu members and 247 local representatives. In the fourth round, candidates who participated in the third round of voting, or newly nominated candidates with the support of at least 21 members of the electoral college are entered on the ballot. The electoral college votes, and the candidate receiving a majority of votes is elected. If no candidate receives a majority, a fifth round of voting is held on the same day. The two candidates who received the most votes during the fourth round are entered into the fifth round, and the candidate receiving a majority of votes is elected.

== Main candidates ==
Candidates
Ene Ergma; Chairman of Pro Patria and Res Publica Union	Toomas Hendrik Ilves; Former Minister of Foreign Affairs and Chairman of Social Democratic Party	Arnold Rüütel; President of Estonia and Chairman of People's Union of Estonia

=== Other candidates ===
Laine Jänes

(Reform Party of Estonia)

Liina Tõnisson

(Independent)

Peeter Tulviste

(Pro Patria Union)

Jaan Männik

(Pro Patria Union)

Toomas Varek

(Centre Party of Estonia)

Aadu Must

(Centre Party of Estonia)

Paul-Eerik Rummo

(Reform Party)

Enn Eesmaa

(Centre Party of Estonia)

Jaak Aaviksoo

(Res Publica)

Jaak Manitski

(Pro Patria Union)

== The electoral campaign ==
In March 2006 five of the six political parties in the Riigikogu appointed twelve potential candidates for the Parliament's election of the President of the Republic. On 11 May Laine Jänes, Liina Tõnisson, Peeter Tulviste, Jaan Männik, and Toomas Varek were eliminated from the race. On 28 June Aadu Must, Paul-Eerik Rummo, and Enn Eesmaa were eliminated. Finally, Jaak Aaviksoo was eliminated on 19 July, leaving two main candidates: Toomas Hendrik Ilves, who is a member of the Social Democrat Party, a former Ambassador of the United States, and a Minister of Foreign Affairs, and Ene Ergma, a former Minister and Deputy Parliamentary Speaker. Neither Ilves nor Ergma got the necessary two-thirds of the vote to become the president during the parliamentary rounds of voting on August 28 and 29.

On 18 May the present president of Estonia Arnold Rüütel declared that he would be a candidate for re-election if the vote was decided by the electoral college, which occurs when the Parliament fails to elect a president with a two-thirds majority. Though, according to analysts, Rüütel had high chances in the electoral college and was supported by the People's Union and the Centre Party, he was constantly criticized for not having participated in the Riigikogu round and not taking part in debates. Rüütel held a poor command of the English language and was often criticised for his passive role in foreign affairs. He was mostly supported by the Russian-speaking population, older voters, the least educated and by those living in the country's rural zones. The end of his term was overshadowed by a scandalous story shown on the Estonian Television about Rüütel's teenage granddaughters running orgies in the presidential palace. Consequently, younger generations perceived their president as weak and incompetent and showed preference for Toomas Ilves, who was nominated as a candidate for the 2006 presidential election by the Reform Party, Union of Pro Patria and Res Publica, and his own Social Democratic party.

His victory in the 2006 presidential election, that was named "clash of the eras", was regarded partially as a protest against the parties that supported Rüütel and as a rejection of the Soviet-era leader in favor of youthful and more liberal president. As Toomas Hendrik Ilves was the sole candidate in the third round of voting, he automatically qualified for a place in the fourth round of voting conducted with the Electoral College. On 21 September, Arnold Rüütel was nominated by at least 21 members of the Electoral College to participate in the fourth round of voting. On 23 September 174 out of the 345 available votes were polled for Toomas Hendrik Ilves for the position of the President of the Republic of Estonia. As he obtained the majority (by a sliver; less 2 votes and it would have led to run-off) of the votes, he was elected as the President of Estonia.

== The election ==
The first three rounds of the presidential election were held in the Estonian parliament between Toomas Hendrik Ilves and Ene Ergma. The first parliamentary round was held on August 28, 2006 with Ene Ergma receiving 65 of 101 votes. On August 29, 2006, Toomas Hendrik Ilves gained 64 votes in the second round held in the parliament. That same day, Ilves gained 64 votes again in the third round. The Centre Party, which would later support Rüütel, and the People's Union party refused to vote in the third round. These first three rounds of voting were inconclusive, since neither candidate obtained the needed two-thirds of the 101 votes to secure the presidency. However, since Ilves was the only remaining candidate by the third round, he continued onward to the final round determined by the electoral college. At this point, Arnold Rüütel, president at the time, stepped in to compete in the fourth round as well. This final round was a simple majority vote within the electoral college, which consists of 347 members from both parliament and local governments This round was held on September 23, 2006, and Ilves won with 174 votes to Rüütel's 162. 173 votes were needed to win the presidency. Toomas Hendrik Ilves entered the presidential office on October 9, 2006.

== Results ==
Candidate	First round		Second round		Third round		Fourth round	
Candidate	Votes	%	Votes	%	Votes	%	Votes	%
Ene Ergma	65	64.36	–	–	–	–	–	–
Toomas Hendrik Ilves	–	–	64	63.37	64	63.37	174	50.43
Arnold Rüütel	–	–	–	–	–	–	162	46.96
Abstentions	36	35.64	36	35.64	36	35.64	–	–
Invalid/blank votes	–	–	1	0.99	1	0.99	9	2.61
Total	101	100	101	100	101	100	345	100
Source: Vabariigi Valimiskomisjon
