= 2011 Estonian presidential election =

← 2006	29 August 2011	2016 →
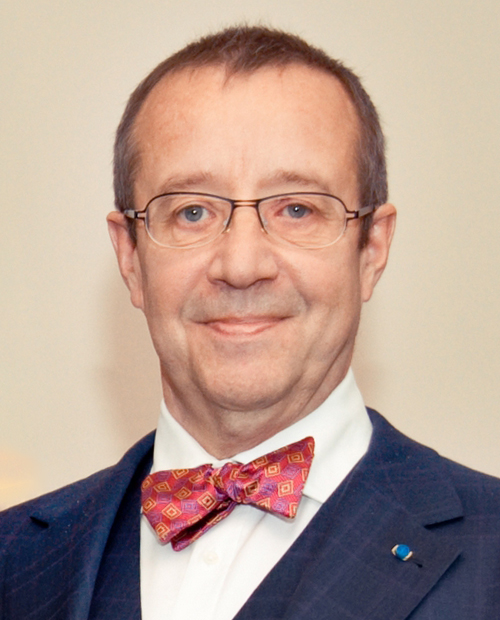

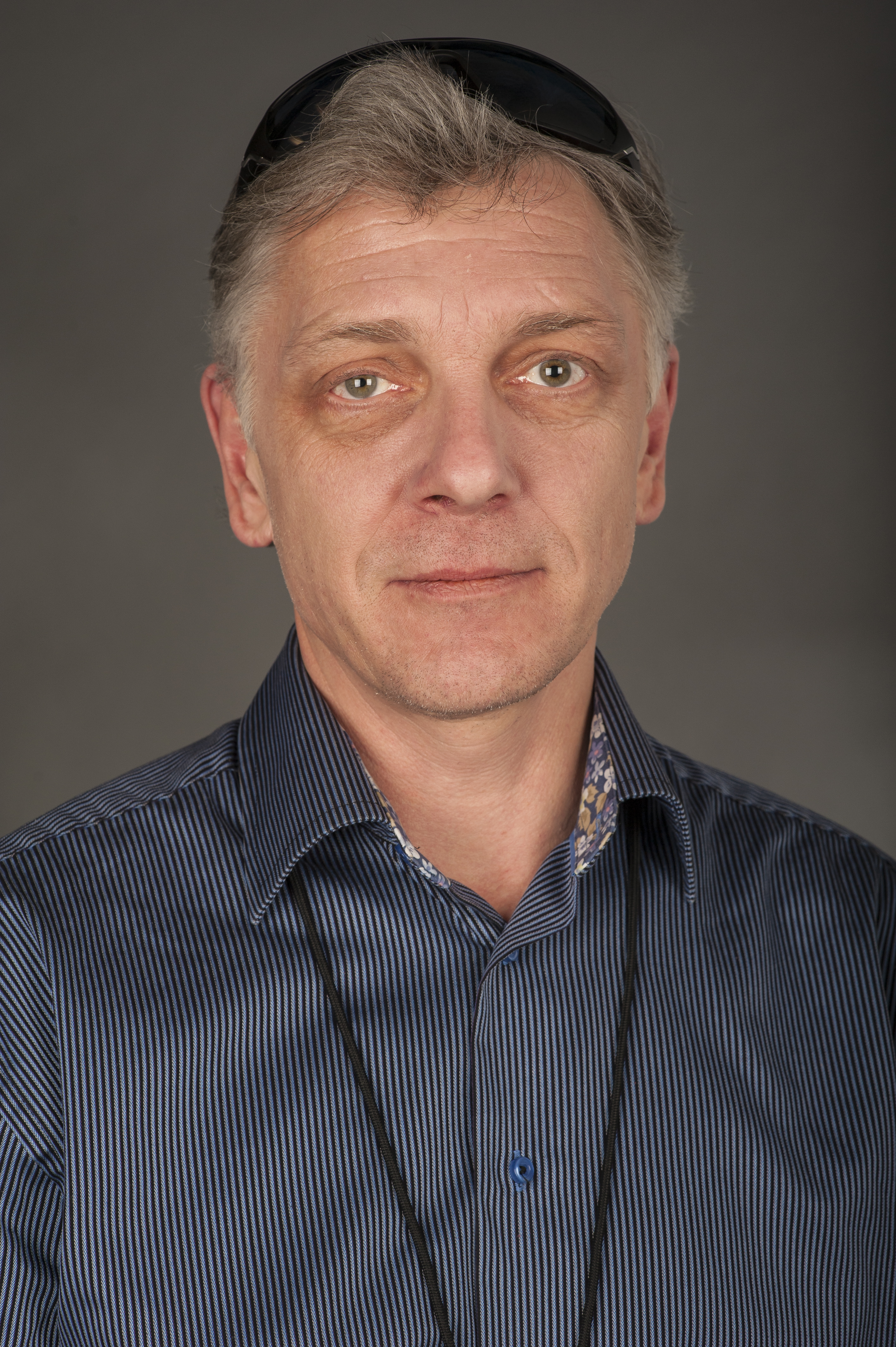
Nominee	Toomas Hendrik Ilves	Indrek Tarand
Party	Social Democratic	Independent
First round	73	25
Nominators	Reform, Social Democratic, IRL	Centre
President before election
Toomas Hendrik Ilves
Social Democratic
Elected President
Toomas Hendrik Ilves
Social Democratic

An indirect presidential election took place in Estonia on August 29, 2011. There were two candidates: incumbent president Toomas Hendrik Ilves and European parliament deputy Indrek Tarand. For the first time in the country's post-Soviet history, only one round took place, as Ilves was able to secure the necessary two-thirds majority to get re-elected without a runoff. Ilves received 73 votes while Tarand obtained only 25. One vote was blank and two were disqualified. Ilves was supported by the ruling Estonian Reform Party and Union of Pro Patria and Res Publica, as well as the Social Democratic Party, to which he formerly belonged. Tarand was supported by the Estonian Centre Party.
