= Dünamo (company) =

Company based in Estonia

Dünamo (since 1968 Estonian full name: Dünamo" Eesti Vabariikliku Nõukogu Eksperimentaal-suusavabrik) was an Estonian company which produced skis, tennis and badminton rackets.

The company established in 1944.

In 1970s and 1980s, the company was one of the biggest skis producers in Soviet Union. In 1977, the company started to produce plastic skis; being the first in Soviet Union.

In 1979, the company has 314 workers, and 1986 has 359 workers.

In 1989, the company was re-organised into the company Desurek which in 1999, went into bankruptcy.
