= Tiina Kaalep =

Estonian journalist, broadcast, and media manager

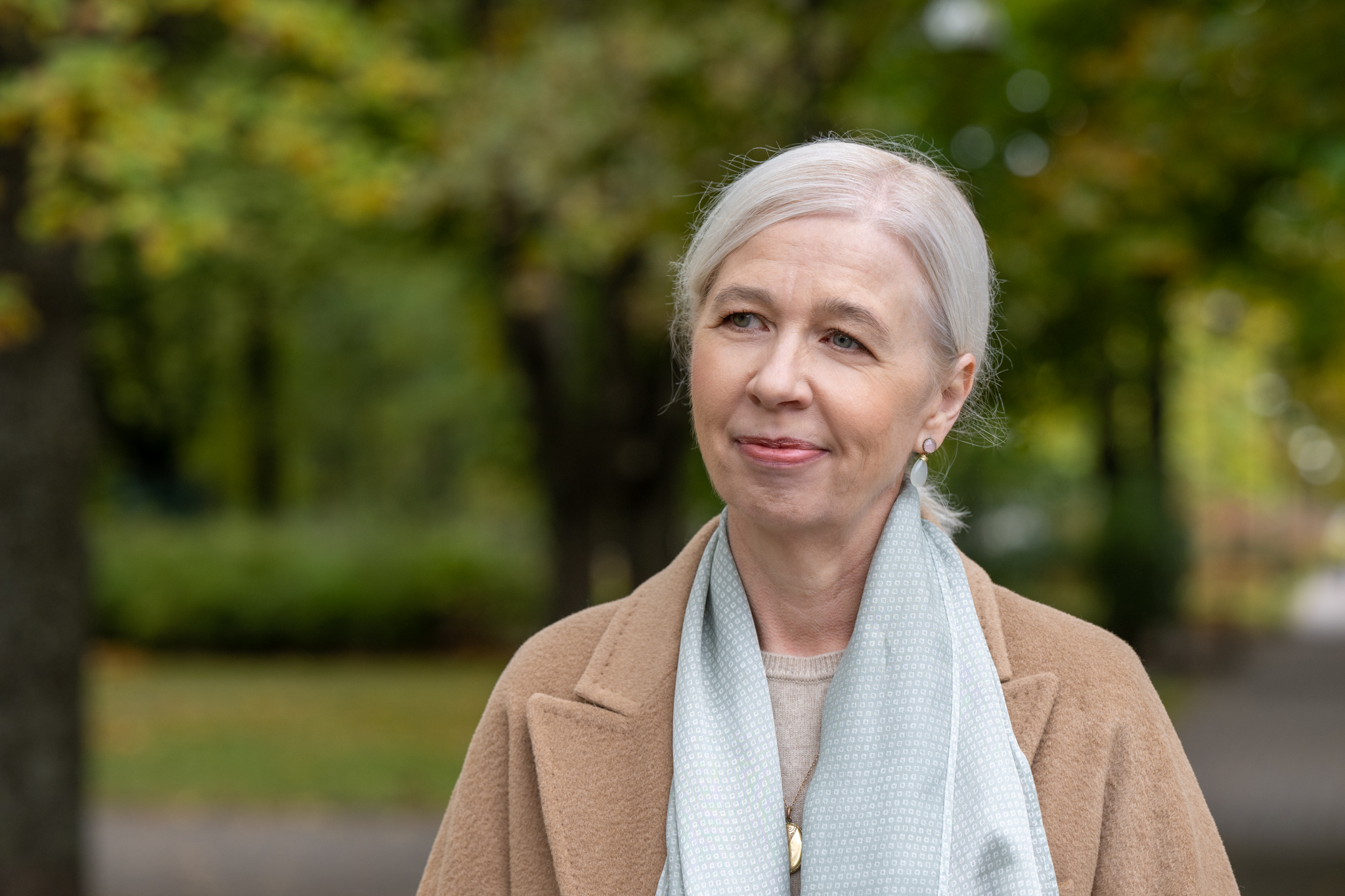
Kaalep in 2022

Tiina Kaalep (born February 6, 1964) is an Estonian journalist, broadcaster, and media manager.

Born in Vana-Vigala, since 1987 she has worked as a reporter at Eesti Raadio, and works as a broadcaster for Raadio Tallinn. She has also worked for the newspaper Postimees, and from 2002 to 2006 was chief editor of the newspaper Eesti Ekspress, Eesti Ekspress Publishing also a board member. From March 2009 to June 2012 she was a board member of the Estonian National Broadcasting.
