= 1996 Estonian presidential election =

- 26 August 1996; 27 August 1996; 20 September 1996
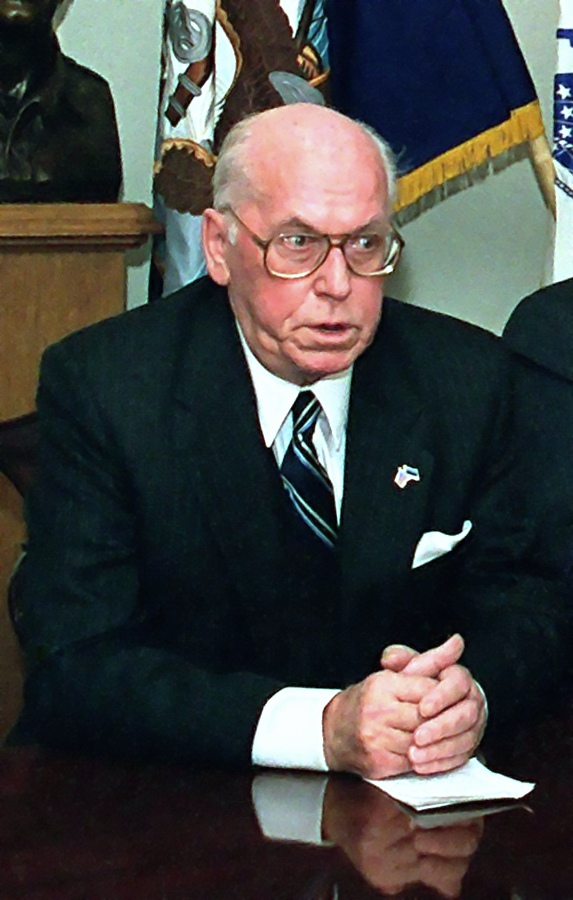

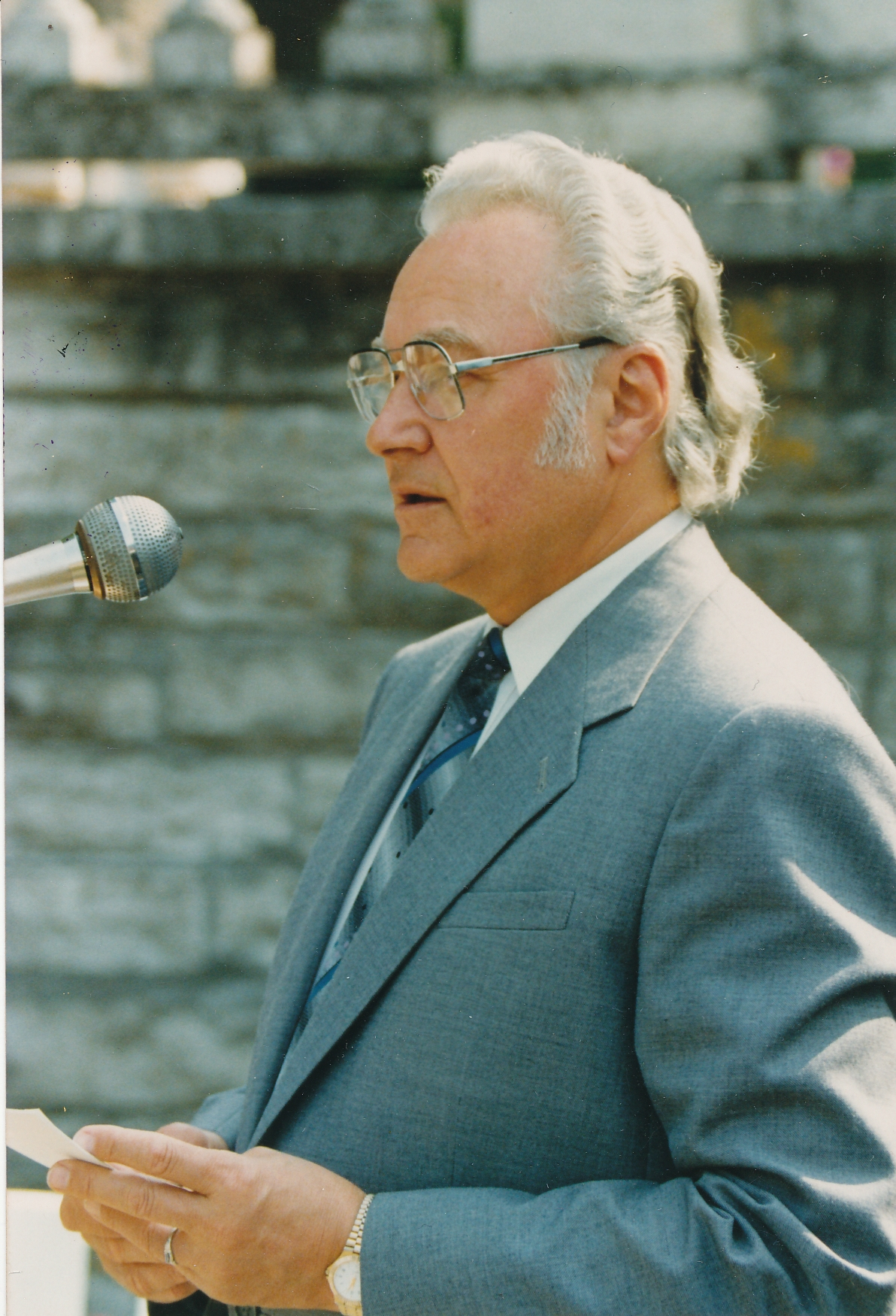

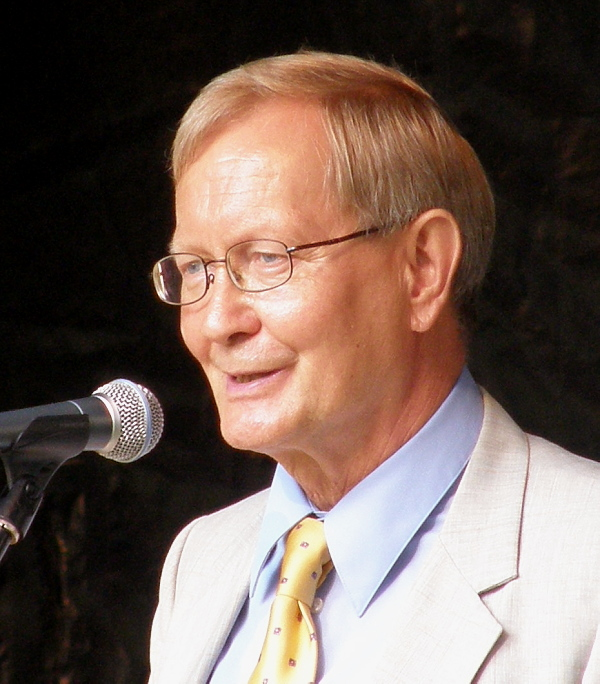

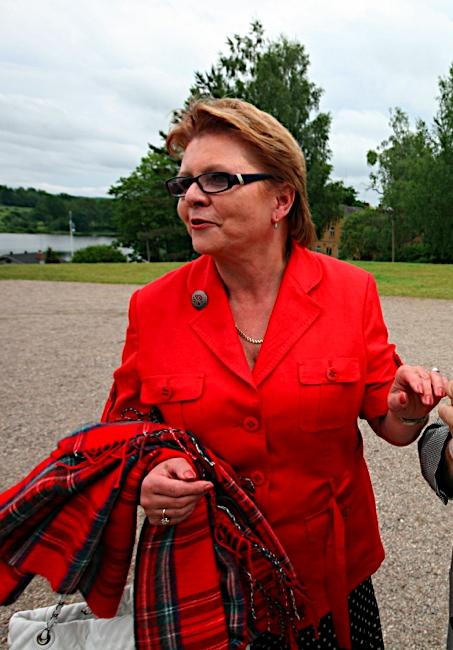

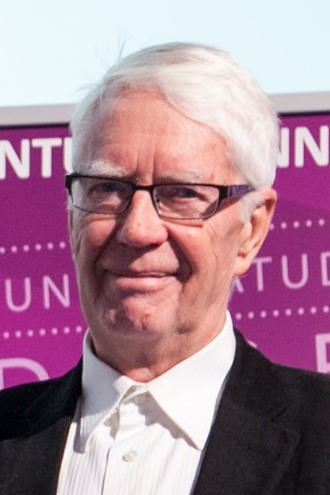
Nominee	Lennart Meri	Arnold Rüütel	Tunne Kelam
Party	Pro Patria Union	People's Union of Estonia	Pro Patria Union
Nominee	Siiri Oviir	Enn Tõugu
Party	Estonian Centre Party	Independent
President before election
Lennart Meri
Pro Patria Union
Elected President
Lennart Meri
Pro Patria Union

The Estonian presidential election is an indirect election in which the President of Estonia is elected. The first round was held on August 26, 1996, the second and third round on August 27, 1996. As no one reached a sufficient majority in the closed ballot vote of the Riigikogu, the next stage was held on September 20 at the Constituent Assembly. Seated President Lennart Meri was elected for a further term.

== Background ==
In August 1991, Estonia declared its independence from the Soviet Union. Lennart Meri was elected as the first President of Estonia after the restoration of Estonian sovereignty.

When the incumbent President Lennart Meri ran for re-election in 1996, his main challenger was Arnold Rüütel, the former Chairman of the Supreme Soviet of Estonia.

== Process ==
According to Section 79 of the Estonian Constitution of 1992, the State Assembly (Riigikogu) was first called upon to elect the head of state. A candidate needed 68 yes votes from the 101 Assembly members to be elected. The three rounds of voting were held from August 26 to 27, with none of the candidates managing to secure the majority in the State Assembly.

As a result, on September 20, 1996, a special electoral assembly (Valimiskogu) convened at the hall of Estonian National Opera in Tallinn. It consisted of the 101 members of Estonian State Assembly and 273 electors who were delegated by the local authorities (cities and municipalities)

In the electoral assembly, the person who receives more than half of the votes cast by the 374 members of the electoral assembly would be elected as President. Moreover, at least 21 members of the electoral council had the right to nominate a candidate. The registration of candidates started on September 16 and ended on September 18. In addition to the two candidates from the previous voting processes, three more candidates were registered: Tunne Kelam, the then Vice Speaker of the Riigikogu; Enn Tõugu, a computer scientist with no party affiliation; and Siiri Oviir, former Minister of Social Affairs.

The first voting process in the Electoral Body had five candidates. None of them received the majority votes necessary for winning the election. Therefore the two front-runners of the first voting, Lennart Meri and Arnold Rüütel, faced off in a second voting process held on the same day. Lennart Meri was able to prevail against his challenger Arnold Rüütel with 196 yes votes.

== Results ==
	Voting in the Riigikogu						Voting in Electoral Body			
Candidate	First round		Second round		Third round		First round		Second Round	
Candidate	Votes	%	Votes	%	Votes	%	Votes	%	Votes	%
Lennart Meri	45	47	49	51	52	54	139	37	196	53
Arnold Rüütel	34	36	34	35	32	33	85	23	126	34
Tunne Kelam	-	-	-	-	-	-	76	20	-	-
Enn Tõugu	-	-	-	-	-	-	47	13	-	-
Siiri Oviir	-	-	-	-	-	-	25	7	-	-
Invalid/blank votes	16	17	13	14	12	13	0	0	50	13
Total	95		96		96		372		372	
