= Ene Ergma =

Estonian politician

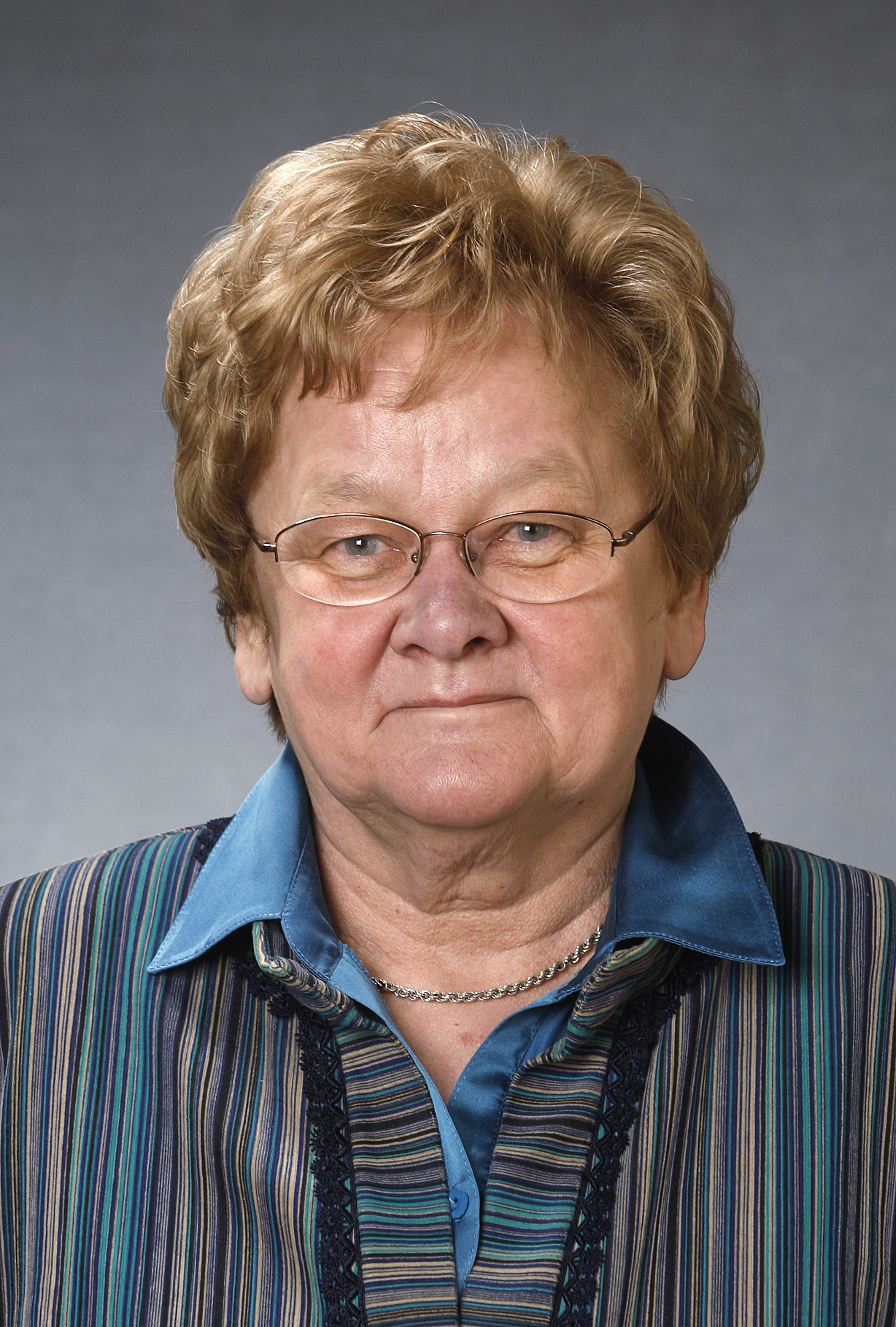

Speaker of the Riigikogu
- In office 2003–2006, 2007–2014

Personal details
- Born: 29 February 1944 (age 82)
- Education: Moscow State University
- Occupation: politician; astronomer; professor

Ene Ergma (born 29 February 1944) is an Estonian politician, a member of the Riigikogu (Estonian parliament), and scientist. She was a member of the political party Union of Pro Patria and Res Publica and, before the two parties merged, a member of Res Publica Party. On 1 June 2016, Ergma announced her resignation from the party, because the party had lost its identity and turned populist.

== Education and scientific career ==
Ergma received her Diploma cum laude (BSc/MSc equivalent) in astronomy and PhD in physics and mathematics from Lomonosov Moscow State University, and a DSc degree from Institute of Space Research, Moscow. Before entering politics she worked as a professor of Astronomy at University of Tartu, Estonia (since 1988). In 1994, she was elected to the Estonian Academy of Sciences. Most of her scientific research has been done on the evolution of the compact objects (such as white dwarfs and neutron stars) and also gamma ray bursts.

== Political career ==
From March 2003 until March 2006, Ergma was Speaker of the Riigikogu. From March 2006 to April 2007, she was the second Vice-President of the Riigikogu. On 2 April 2007 she was re-elected as Speaker of the Riigikogu and kept the post until March 2014.

Ergma was the only candidate in the first round of the 2006 presidential election in the Riigikogu on 28 August 2006. She gathered 65 votes, 3 votes less than the at least 2/3 of the Riigikogu votes necessary for the election.

She also ran along Volli Kalm and Birute Klaas for the presidency of University of Tartu, but was not elected.

She is the chairwoman of the Space Research Committee of the Riigikogu.

== See also ==
- List of Estonians

Preceded by Toomas Savi	President of the Riigikogu; 2003–2006	Succeeded by Toomas Varek
Preceded by Toomas Varek	President of the Riigikogu; 2007-2014	Succeeded by Eiki Nestor
