= Peeter Tulviste =

Estonian psychologist, educator and politician

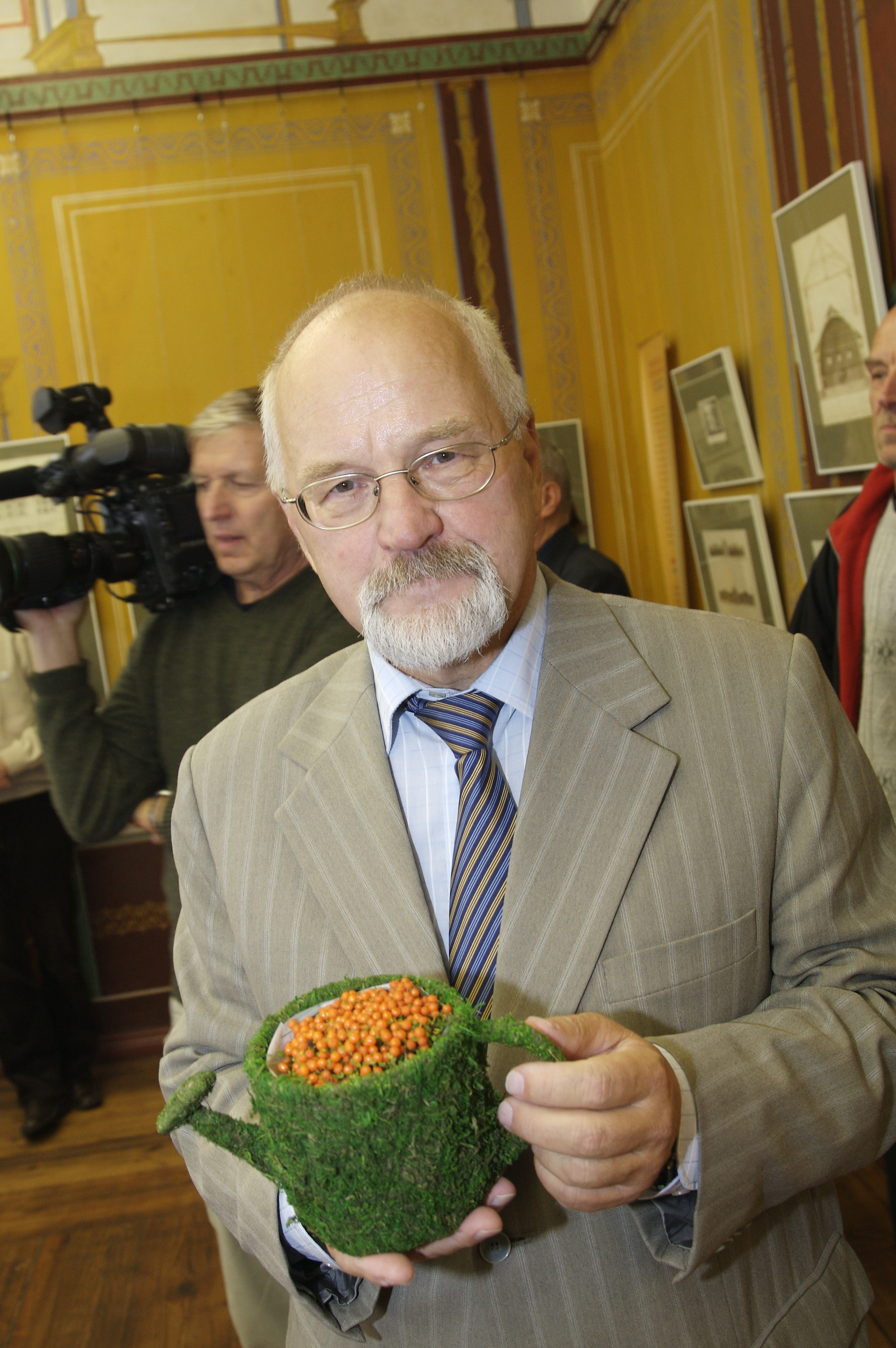
Peeter Tulviste in 2007

Peeter Tulviste (28 October 1945 in Tallinn – 11 March 2017) was an Estonian psychologist, educator and politician. He was a member of X and XI Riigikogu.

Tulviste was a professor at the University of Tartu and from 1993 until 1998 he was the rector of the university. In the Fall of 1998, Tulviste was a Resident Fellow at the Swedish Collegium for Advanced Study in Uppsala, Sweden. From 1994 he was a member of the Estonian Academy of Sciences. At the same time, he was the Vice-President of the Academy from 1994 to 2004, and from 1994 to 1999 and from 2004 to 2009 he headed the Department of Humanities and Social Sciences of the academy.
