= Toomas Savi =

Estonian politician

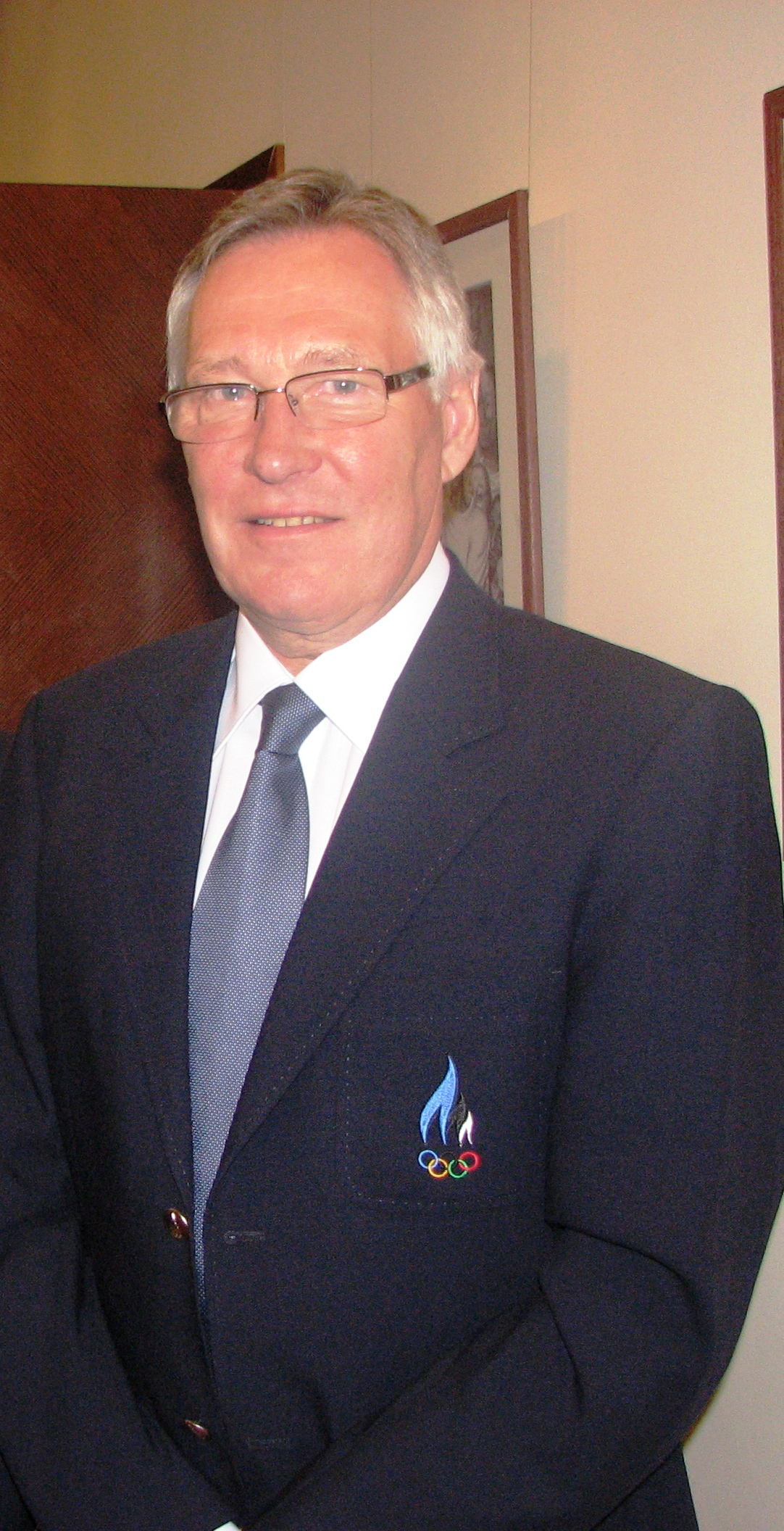
Toomas Savi in 2010

Toomas Savi (born 30 December 1942 in Tartu, Estonia) is an Estonian politician and in 2004-2009 was a Member of the European Parliament for the Estonian Reform Party, part of the European Liberal Democrat and Reform Party.

== Career ==
Toomas Savi is a doctor by profession. He graduated in medicine from University of Tartu in 1970, getting a medical degree in sports physiology in 1975. Over the years he has worked both as a practising doctor and a researcher. From 1979 to 1993, Toomas Savi was a Chief Medical Officer at Tartu Physical Culture Medical Centre. He has practiced in Kuopio University Central Hospital and Kajaani Central Hospital, Finland.

His political activities started in the end 1980s. 1989 to 2000 he served several terms as a member of Tartu City Council. From 1993 to 1995 Toomas Savi was a Vice Mayor of Tartu. 1994 he became a member of the Estonian Reform Party (Reformierakond). 1995 he was elected to the Estonian Parliament, Riigikogu, where he served two terms as Speaker from March 1995 to March 2003. From 2003 to 2004 he was Deputy Speaker of Riigikogu and an observer in the European Parliament.

He was elected to the European Parliament in spring 2004, becoming the only representative of his party in that assembly. In the European Parliament he is a member of the Committee on Development and the Vice-Chairman of Delegation for relations with Canada.

As a sports doctor and an avid sportsman he was a founding member in 1989 and since 2008, the Vice President of the Estonian Olympic Committee. Since 1999, he has been also the President of the Estonian Skiing Association.

== Personal ==
He is married to Kirsti Savi.

Political offices
Preceded by Ülo Nugis	Speaker of the Riigikogu; 1995–2003	Succeeded by Ene Ergma
