= List of recipients of the Order of the Three Stars =

Here is a classification of the most notable recipients of Order of the Three Stars, the highest order of the Republic of Latvia.

== Chronology of recipients ==
=== Commander Grand Cross (with Chain): Pre-World War II (1924–1940) ===
N°	Recipients	Quality	Country	Rank	Date
1	Konstantin Päts	State Elder (1921–1922; 1923–1924)	Estonia	Commander GC with Chain	
2	Jaan Tõnisson	State Elder (1927–1928)	Estonia	Commander GC with Chain	
3	Tomáš Garrigue Masaryk	President (1918–1935)	Czechoslovakia	Commander GC with Chain	
4	Gaston Doumergue	President (1924–1931)	France	Commander GC with Chain	
5	Antanas Smetona	President (1926–1940)	Lithuania	Commander GC with Chain	
6	Ignacy Mościcki	President (1926–1939)	Poland	Commander GC with Chain	
7	Lauri Kristian Relander	President (1925–1931)	Finland	Commander GC with Chain	
8	Gustaf V of Sweden	King (1907–1950)	Sweden	Commander GC with Chain	
9	Gustavs Zemgals	President (1927–1930)	Latvia	Commander GC with Chain	
10	Albert I of Belgium	King (1909–1934)	Belgium	Commander GC with Chain	
11	Alberts Kviesis	President (1930–1936)	Latvia	Commander GC with Chain	
12	Pehr Evind Svinhufvud	President (1931–1937)	Finland	Commander GC with Chain	14 December 1931
13	Kārlis Ulmanis	President (1936–1940)	Latvia	Commander GC with Chain	
14	Miklós Horthy	Regent (1920–1944 )	Hungary	Commander GC with Chain	
15	Antanas Merkys	Mayor of Kaunas (1933–1939)	Lithuania	Commander GC	15 March 1937

=== Commander Grand Cross (with Chain): Modern era (since 1994) ===
N°	Recipients	Quality	Country	Rank	Date
Presidency of Guntis Ulmanis (1993–1999)
1	François Mitterrand	President (1981–1995)	France	Commander GC with Chain	12 April 1995
1	François Mitterrand	Co-Prince (1981–1995)	Andorra	Commander GC with Chain	12 April 1995
2	Carl XVI Gustaf of Sweden	King (1973–)	Sweden	Commander GC with Chain	25 September 1995
3	Queen Silvia of Sweden	Queen Consort	Sweden	Commander Grand Cross	25 September 1995
4	Algirdas Brazauskas	President (1993–1988)	Lithuania	Commander Grand Cross	22 April 1996
5	Lennart Meri	President (1992–2001)	Estonia	Commander GC with Chain	9 October 1996
6	Elizabeth II	Queen (1952–2022)	United Kingdom	Commander GC with Chain	30 October 1996
7	Margrethe II of Denmark	Queen (1972–2024)	Denmark	Commander GC with Chain	12 March 1997
8	Frederik, Crown Prince of Denmark	Crown Prince, now King	Denmark	Commander Grand Cross	12 March 1997
9	Henrik, Prince Consort of Denmark	Prince Consort	Denmark	Commander Grand Cross	12 March 1997
10	Jacques Chirac	President (1995–2007)	France	Commander Grand Cross	8 April 1997
10	Jacques Chirac	Co-Prince (1995–2007)	Andorra	Commander Grand Cross	8 April 1997
11	Aleksander Kwaśniewski	President (1995–2005)	Poland	Commander Grand Cross	23 April 1997
12	Oscar Luigi Scalfaro	President (1992–1999)	Italy	Commander Grand Cross	23 April 1997
13	Martti Ahtisaari	President (1994–2000)	Finland	Commander Grand Cross	17 October 1997
14	Ólafur Ragnar Grímsson	President (1996–2016)	Iceland	Commander Grand Cross	5 June 1998
15	Harald V of Norway	King (1991–)	Norway	Commander GC with Chain	22 July 1998
16	Queen Sonja of Norway	Queen Consort	Norway	Commander Grand Cross	22 July 1998
17	Guntis Ulmanis	President (1993–1999)	Latvia	Commander GC with Chain	26 October 1998
18	Konstantinos Stephanopoulos	President (1995–2005)	Greece	Commander Grand Cross	22 March 1999
19	Roman Herzog	President (1994–1999)	Germany	Commander Grand Cross	19 May 1999
20	Václav Havel	President (1994–1999)	Czech Republic	Commander GC with Chain	6 July 1999
Presidency of Vaira Vīķe-Freiberga (1999–2007)
N°	Recipients	Quality	Country	Rank	Date
21	Vaira Vīķe-Freiberga	President (1999–2007)	Latvia	Commander GC with Chain	8 July 1999
22	Boris Yeltsin	President (1992–2000)	Russia	Commander GC with Chain	18 February 2000
23	Haakon, Crown Prince of Norway	Crown Prince	Norway	Commander Grand Cross	15 September 2000
24	Valdas Adamkus	President (1998–2003/2004–09)	Lithuania	Commander GC with Chain	12 March 2001
25	Alma Adamkienė	President's wife	Lithuania	Commander Grand Cross	12 March 2001
26	Tarja Halonen	President (2000–2012)	Finland	Commander GC with Chain	12 April 2001
27	Pentti Arajärvi	President's husband	Finland	Commander Grand Cross	12 April 2001
28	Ferenc Mádl	President (2000–2005)	Hungary	Commander GC with Chain	10 October 2001
29	Milan Kučan	President (1991–2002)	Slovenia	Commander GC with Chain	12 April 2002
30	Johannes Rau	President (1999–2004)	Germany	Commander GC with Chain	10 March 2003
31	Christina Rau	President's wife	Germany	Commander Grand Cross	10 March 2003
32	Jorge Sampaio	President (1996–2006)	Portugal	Commander GC with Chain	8 May 2003
33	Maria José Ritta	President's wife	Portugal	Commander Grand Cross	8 May 2003
34	Georgi Parvanov	President (2002–2012)	Bulgaria	Commander GC with Chain	25 November 2003
35	Zorka Parvanova	President's wife	Bulgaria	Commander Grand Cross	25 November 2003
36	Guido de Marco	President (1999–2004)	Malta	Commander Grand Cross	10 February 2004
37	Edward Fenech Adami	Pr. Min. (1998–2003/2004); President (2004–2009)	Malta	Commander Grand Cross	10 February 2004
38	Violet de Marco	President's wife	Malta	Commander Grand Cross	10 February 2004
39	Carlo Azeglio Ciampi	President (1999–2006)	Italy	Commander GC with Chain	31 March 2004
Orders administered by the Chapter
40	Juan Carlos I of Spain	King (1975–2014)	Spain	Commander GC with Chain	16 October 2004
N°	Recipients	Quality	Country	Rank	Date
41	Queen Sofía of Spain	Queen Consort (1975–2014)	Spain	Commander GC with Chain	16 October 2004
42	Felipe, Prince of Asturias	Crown Prince now King (2014–)	Spain	Commander Grand Cross	16 October 2004
43	Letizia, Princess of Asturias	Crown Princess C. now Queen consort (2014–)	Spain	Commander Grand Cross	16 October 2004
44	Jaap de Hoop Scheffer	Secretary General of NATO	Netherlands	Commander Grand Cross	16 October 2004
45	Günter Verheugen	European Commissioner	Germany	Commander Grand Cross	16 October 2004
46	Romano Prodi	Pr. of Eur. Commission	Italy	Commander Grand Cross	16 October 2004
47	Pat Cox	Pr. of the Eur. Parliament	Ireland	Commander Grand Cross	16 October 2004
48	George Robertson	Secretary General of NATO	United Kingdom	Commander Grand Cross	16 October 2004
49	Ivan Gašparovič	President (2004–2014 )	Slovakia	Commander Grand Cross	28 February 2005
50	George W. Bush	President (2001–2009)	United States	Commander GC with Chain	3 May 2005
51	Jolanta Kwaśniewska	President's wife	Poland	Commander Grand Cross	4 July 2005
52	Arnold Rüütel	President (2001–2006)	Estonia	Commander GC with Chain	30 November 2005
53	Ingrid Rüütel	President's wife	Estonia	Commander Grand Cross	30 November 2005
54	Viktor Yushchenko	President (2005–2010)	Ukraine	Commander GC with Chain	24 April 2006
55	Beatrix of the Netherlands	Queen (1980–2013)	Netherlands	Commander GC with Chain	17 May 2006
56	Alexy II of Moscow	Patriarch of Moscow (1990–2008)	Russia	Commander Grand Cross	25 May 2006
57	Mary Fenech Adami	President's wife	Malta	Commander Grand Cross	15 June 2006
58	László Sólyom	President (2005–2010)	Hungary	Commander GC with Chain	31 August 2006
59	Henri, Grand Duke of Luxembourg	Grand Duke (2000–2025)	Luxembourg	Commander GC with Chain	4 December 2006
60	Maria Teresa, Gr.D. of Luxembourg	Grand Duchess Consort (2000–2025)	Luxembourg	Commander Grand Cross	4 December 2006
N°	Recipients	Quality	Country	Rank	Date
61	Jean-Claude Juncker	Pr. Minister (1995–2013)	Luxembourg	Commander Grand Cross	4 December 2006
62	Imants Freibergs	President's husband	Latvia	Commander Grand Cross	15 March 2007
63	Albert II of Belgium	King (1993–2013)	Belgium	Commander GC with Chain	15 March 2007
64	Queen Paola of Belgium	Queen Consort (1993–2013) now former Queen	Belgium	Commander Grand Cross	15 March 2007
65	Mohammed VI of Morocco	King (1999–)	Morocco	Commander GC with Chain	15 March 2007
66	Akihito	Emperor (1989–2019)	Japan	Commander GC with Chain	15 March 2007
67	Tassos Papadopoulos	President (2003–2008)	Cyprus	Commander GC with Chain	15 March 2007
68	Foteini Papadopoulou	President's wife	Cyprus	Commander Grand Cross	15 March 2007
Presidency of Valdis Zatlers (2007–2011)
69	Valdis Zatlers	President (2007–2011)	Latvia	Commander GC with Chain	11 April 2008
70	Kateryna Yushchenko	President's wife	Ukraine	Commander Grand Cross	19 June 2008
71	Stjepan Mesić	President (2000–2010)	Croatia	Commander GC with Chain	1 September 2008
72	Nursultan Nazarbayev	President (1990–2019)	Kazakhstan	Commander GC with Chain	1 October 2008
73	Islam Karimov	President (1990–2016 )	Uzbekistan	Commander GC with Chain	1 October 2008
74	Matthew Festing	Prince & Gr.Mast. (2008–2017)	Order of Malta	Commander Grand Cross	14 October 2008
75	Hans-Gert Pöttering	Pr. of the Eur. Parliament	Germany	Commander Grand Cross	12 January 2009
76	Toomas Hendrik Ilves	President (2006–2016)	Estonia	Commander GC with Chain	30 March 2009
77	Evelin Ilves	President's wife	Estonia	Commander Grand Cross	30 March 2009
78	Emomalii Rahmon	President (1992–)	Tajikistan	Commander GC with Chain	9 July 2009
79	Ilham Aliyev	President (2003–)	Azerbaijan	Commander GC with Chain	6 August 2009
80	Dalia Grybauskaitė	President (2009–2019)	Lithuania	Commander GC with Chain	4 February 2011
81	Traian Băsescu	President (2004–2012)	Romania	Commander GC with Chain	28 February 2011
Presidency of Andris Bērziņš (2011–2015)
82	Andris Bērziņš	President (2011–2015)	Latvia	Commander GC with Chain	7 July 2011
83	Ivo Josipović	President (2010–2015)	Croatia	Commander GC with Chain	29 March 2012
84	Mikheil Saakashvili	President (2008–2013)	Georgia	Commander GC with Chain	28 May 2012
85	Bronisław Komorowski	President (2010–2015)	Poland	Commander GC with Chain	22 November 2012
86	Anna Komorowska	President's wife	Poland	Commander Grand Cross	22 November 2012
87	Joachim Gauck	President (2012–2017)	Germany	Commander GC with Chain	3 July 2013
88	Daniela Schadt	President's domestic partner	Germany	Commander Grand Cross	3 July 2013
89	Sauli Niinistö	President (2012–)	Finland	Commander GC with Chain	9 September 2013
90	Jenni Haukio	President's wife	Finland	Commander Grand Cross	9 September 2013
91	Heinz Fischer	President (2004–2017)	Austria	Commander GC with Chain	2 April 2015
N°	Recipients	Quality	Country	Rank	Date

=== Grand Officer ===
N°	Recipients	Quality	Country	Rank	Date
.	Victoria, Cr. Pr. of Sweden	Crown Princess	Sweden	Grand Officer (2nd Cl.)	25 September 1995
.	Princess Lilian, D. of Halland	Princess	Sweden	Grand Officer (2nd Cl.)	25 September 1995
.	Prince Carl Philip	Prince	Sweden	Grand Officer (2nd Cl.)	22 March 2005
.	Princess Madeleine	Princess	Sweden	Grand Officer (2nd Cl.)	22 March 2005
.	Angela Merkel	Chancellor of Germany	Germany	Grand Officer (2nd Cl.)	19 February 2019

== By regime and country ==
=== Monarchies ===
N°	Recipients	Quality	Country	Rank	Date
UNITED KINGDOM
6	Elizabeth II	Queen (1952–2022)	United Kingdom	Commander GC with Chain	30 October 1996
NORWAY
15	Harald V of Norway	King (1991–2026)	Norway	Commander GC with Chain	22 July 1998
16	Queen Sonja of Norway	Queen Consort	Norway	Commander Grand Cross	22 July 1998
23	Haakon, Crown Prince of Norway	Crown Prince	Norway	Commander Grand Cross	15 September 2000
SWEDEN
2	Carl XVI Gustaf of Sweden	King (1973–)	Sweden	Commander GC with Chain	25 September 1995
3	Queen Silvia of Sweden	Queen Consort	Sweden	Commander Grand Cross	25 September 1995
.	Victoria, Cr. Pr. of Sweden	Crown Princess	Sweden	Grand Officer (2nd Cl.)	25 September 1995
.	Prince Carl Philip	Prince	Sweden	Grand Officer (2nd Cl.)	22 March 2005
.	Princess Madeleine	Princess	Sweden	Grand Officer (2nd Cl.)	22 March 2005
.	Princess Lilian, D. of Halland	Princess	Sweden	Grand Officer (2nd Cl.)	25 September 1995
DENMARK
7	Margrethe II of Denmark	Queen (1972–2024)	Denmark	Commander GC with Chain	12 March 1997
8	Frederik X of Denmark	Crown Prince then King (2024–)	Denmark	Commander Grand Cross	12 March 1997
9	Henrik, Prince Consort of Denmark	Prince Consort (1972–2018)	Denmark	Commander Grand Cross	12 March 1997
.	Queen Mary of Denmark	Queen Consort	Denmark	Commander Grand Cross	28 October 2025
N°	Recipients	Quality	Country	Rank	Date
NETHERLANDS
55	Beatrix of the Netherlands	Queen (1980–2013 then Princess)	Netherlands	Commander GC with Chain	17 May 2006
.	Willem-Alexander of the Netherlands	King (2013–)	Netherlands	Commander GC with Chain	6 June 2018
.	Máxima of the Netherlands	Queen Consort	Netherlands	Commander Grand Cross	6 June 2018
BELGIUM
63	Albert II of Belgium	King (1993–2013)	Belgium	Commander GC with Chain	15 March 2007
64	Queen Paola of Belgium	Queen Consort (1993–2013)	Belgium	Commander Grand Cross	15 March 2007
LUXEMBOURG
59	Henri, Grand Duke of Luxembourg	Grand Duke (2000–)	Luxembourg	Commander GC with Chain	4 December 2006
60	Maria Teresa, Gr.D. of Luxembourg	Grand Duchess Consort	Luxembourg	Commander Grand Cross	4 December 2006
61	Jean-Claude Juncker	Pr. Minister (1995–2013)	Luxembourg	Commander Grand Cross	4 December 2006
ANDORRA
1	François Mitterrand	Co-Prince (1981–1995)	Andorra	Commander GC with Chain	12 April 1995
10	Jacques Chirac	Co-Prince (1995–2007)	Andorra	Commander Grand Cross	8 April 1997
SPAIN
40	Juan Carlos I of Spain	King (1975–2014)	Spain	Commander GC with Chain	16 October 2004
41	Queen Sofía of Spain	Queen Consort (1975–2014)	Spain	Commander GC with Chain	16 October 2004
42	Felipe, Prince of Asturias	Crown Prince	Spain	Commander Grand Cross	16 October 2004
43	Letizia, Princess of Asturias	Crown Princess Consort	Spain	Commander Grand Cross	16 October 2004
MOROCCO
65	Mohammed VI of Morocco	King (1999–)	Morocco	Commander GC with Chain	15 March 2007
JAPAN
66	Akihito	Emperor (1989–2019)	Japan	Commander GC with Chain	15 March 2007

=== Republics ===
N°	Recipients	Quality	Country	Rank	Date
LATVIA
17	Guntis Ulmanis	President (1993–1999)	Latvia	Commander GC with Chain	26 October 1998
21	Vaira Vīķe-Freiberga	President (1999–2007)	Latvia	Commander GC with Chain	8 July 1999
62	Imants Freibergs	President's husband	Latvia	Commander Grand Cross	15 March 2007
69	Valdis Zatlers	President (2007–2011)	Latvia	Commander GC with Chain	11 April 2008
82	Andris Bērziņš	President (2011–2015 )	Latvia	Commander GC with Chain	7 July 2011
.	Raimonds Vējonis	President (2015–2019 )	Latvia	Commander GC with Chain	8 July 2015
.	Egils Levits	President (2019–2023)	Latvia	Commander GC with Chain	8 July 2019
Estonia
5	Lennart Meri	President (1992–2001)	Estonia	Commander GC with Chain	9 October 1996
33	Heiki Loot	State Secretary of the Republic of Estonia	Estonia	Commander Grand Cross	30 November 2005
52	Arnold Rüütel	President (2001–2006)	Estonia	Commander GC with Chain	30 November 2005
53	Ingrid Rüütel	President's wife	Estonia	Commander Grand Cross	30 November 2005
76	Toomas Hendrik Ilves	President (2006–2016)	Estonia	Commander GC with Chain	30 March 2009
77	Evelin Ilves	President's wife	Estonia	Commander Grand Cross	30 March 2009
.	Kersti Kaljulaid	President (2016–)	Estonia	Commander GC with Chain	8 April 2019
.	Georgi-Rene Maksimovski	President's husbands	Estonia	Commander Grand Cross	8 April 2019
Lithuania
4	Algirdas Brazauskas	President (1993–1998)	Lithuania	Commander Grand Cross	22 April 1996
24	Valdas Adamkus	President (1998–2003/2004–09)	Lithuania	Commander GC with Chain	12 March 2001
25	Alma Adamkienė	President's wife	Lithuania	Commander Grand Cross	12 March 2001
80	Dalia Grybauskaitė	President (2009–2019)	Lithuania	Commander GC with Chain	4 February 2011
N°	Recipients	Quality	Country	Rank	Date
Austria
91	Heinz Fischer	President (2004–2016)	Austria	Commander GC with Chain	2 April 2015
Azerbaijan
79	Ilham Aliyev	President (2003–)	Azerbaijan	Commander GC with Chain	6 August 2009
Bulgaria
34	Georgi Parvanov	President (2002–2012)	Bulgaria	Commander GC with Chain	25 November 2003
35	Zorka Parvanova	President's wife	Bulgaria	Commander Grand Cross	25 November 2003
Croatia
71	Stjepan Mesić	President (2000–2010)	Croatia	Commander GC with Chain	1 September 2008
83	Ivo Josipović	President (2010–2015)	Croatia	Commander GC with Chain	29 March 2012
Cyprus
67	Tassos Papadopoulos	President (2003–2008)	Cyprus	Commander GC with Chain	15 March 2007
68	Foteini Papadopoulou	President's wife	Cyprus	Commander Grand Cross	15 March 2007
Czech Republic
20	Václav Havel	President (1994–1999)	Czech Republic	Commander GC with Chain	6 July 1999
Finland
13	Martti Ahtisaari	President (1994–2000)	Finland	Commander Grand Cross	17 October 1997
26	Tarja Halonen	President (2000–2012)	Finland	Commander GC with Chain	12 April 2001
27	Pentti Arajärvi	President's husband	Finland	Commander Grand Cross	12 April 2001
89	Sauli Niinistö	President (2012–)	Finland	Commander GC with Chain	9 September 2013
90	Jenni Haukio	President's wife	Finland	Commander Grand Cross	9 September 2013
France
1	François Mitterrand	President (1981–1995)	France	Commander GC with Chain	12 April 1995
10	Jacques Chirac	President (1995–2007)	France	Commander Grand Cross	8 April 1997
Georgia
84	Mikheil Saakashvili	President (2008–2013)	Georgia	Commander GC with Chain	28 May 2012
Germany
19	Roman Herzog	President (1994–1999)	Germany	Commander Grand Cross	19 May 1999
30	Johannes Rau	President (1999–2004)	Germany	Commander GC with Chain	10 March 2003
31	Christina Rau	President's wife	Germany	Commander Grand Cross	10 March 2003
87	Joachim Gauck	President (2012–2017)	Germany	Commander GC with Chain	3 July 2013
88	Daniela Schadt	President's domestic partner	Germany	Commander Grand Cross	3 July 2013
.	Frank-Walter Steinmeier	President (2017–)	Germany	Commander GC with Chain	19 February 2019
.	Elke Büdenbender	President's wife	Germany	Commander Grand Cross	19 February 2019
Greece
18	Konstantinos Stephanopoulos	President (1995–2005)	Greece	Commander Grand Cross	22 March 1999
Hungary
28	Ferenc Mádl	President (2000–2005)	Hungary	Commander GC with Chain	10 October 2001
58	László Sólyom	President (2005–2010)	Hungary	Commander GC with Chain	31 August 2006
Iceland
14	Ólafur Ragnar Grímsson	President (1996–2016)	Iceland	Commander Grand Cross	5 June 1998
.	Guðni Th. Jóhannesson	President (2016–)	Iceland	Commander GC with Chain	16 November 2018
Italy
12	Oscar Luigi Scalfaro	President (1992–1999)	Italy	Commander Grand Cross	23 April 1997
39	Carlo Azeglio Ciampi	President (1999–2006)	Italy	Commander GC with Chain	31 March 2004
.	Sergio Mattarella	President (2015–)	Italy	Commander GC with Chain	3 July 2018
.	Laura Mattarella	President Mattarella daughter	Italy	Commander Grand Cross	3 July 2018
Kazakhstan
72	Nursultan Nazarbayev	President (1990–2019)	Kazakhstan	Commander GC with Chain	1 October 2008
Malta
36	Guido de Marco	President (1999–2004)	Malta	Commander Grand Cross	10 February 2004
38	Violet de Marco née Saliba	President's wife	Malta	Commander Grand Cross	10 February 2004
37	Eddie Fenech Adami	Pr. Min. (1998–2003/2004); President (2004–2009)	Malta	Commander Grand Cross	10 February 2004
57	Mary Fenech Adami	President's wife	Malta	Commander Grand Cross	15 June 2006
Poland
11	Aleksander Kwaśniewski	President (1995–2005)	Poland	Commander Grand Cross	23 April 1997
51	Jolanta Kwaśniewska	President's wife	Poland	Commander Grand Cross	4 July 2005
85	Bronisław Komorowski	President (2010–2015)	Poland	Commander GC with Chain	22 November 2012
86	Anna Komorowska	President's wife	Poland	Commander Grand Cross	22 November 2012
Portugal
32	Jorge Sampaio	President (1996–2006)	Portugal	Commander GC with Chain	8 May 2003
33	Maria José Ritta	President's wife	Portugal	Commander Grand Cross	8 May 2003
N°	Recipients	Quality	Country	Rank	Date
Romania
81	Traian Băsescu	President (2004–2014)	Romania	Commander GC with Chain	28 February 2011
Russia
22	Boris Yeltsin	President (1991–1999)	Russia	Commander GC with Chain	18 February 2000
Slovakia
49	Ivan Gašparovič	President (2004–2014)	Slovakia	Commander Grand Cross	28 February 2005
Slovenia
29	Milan Kučan	President (1991–2002)	Slovenia	Commander GC with Chain	12 April 2002
Tajikistan
78	Emomalii Rahmon	President (1992–)	Tajikistan	Commander GC with Chain	9 July 2009
Ukraine
54	Viktor Yushchenko	President (2005–2010)	Ukraine	Commander GC with Chain	24 April 2006
70	Kateryna Yushchenko	President's wife	Ukraine	Commander Grand Cross	19 June 2008
United States
50	George W. Bush	President (2001–2009)	United States	Commander GC with Chain	3 May 2005
Uzbekistan
73	Islam Karimov	President (1990–2016)	Uzbekistan	Commander GC with Chain	1 October 2008
N°	Recipients	Quality	Country	Rank	Date

=== International V.I.P.s ===
Orders administered by the Chapter
NATO
48	George Robertson	Secretary General of NATO	United Kingdom	Commander Grand Cross	16 October 2004
44	Jaap de Hoop Scheffer	Secretary General of NATO	Netherlands	Commander Grand Cross	16 October 2004
EUROPEAN UNION
46	Romano Prodi	Pr. of Eur. Commission	Italy	Commander Grand Cross	16 October 2004
45	Günter Verheugen	European Commissioner	Germany	Commander Grand Cross	16 October 2004
47	Pat Cox	Pr. of the Eur. Parliament	Ireland	Commander Grand Cross	16 October 2004
75	Hans-Gert Pöttering	Pr. of the Eur. Parliament	Germany	Commander Grand Cross	12 January 2009
RELIGIOUS LEADERS
56	Alexy II of Moscow	Patriarch of Moscow (1990–2008)	Russia	Commander Grand Cross	25 May 2006
74	Matthew Festing	Prince & Gr.Mast. (2008–2017)	Order of Malta	Commander Grand Cross	14 October 2008
