= List of recipients of the Order of the Polar Star =

This is an incomplete list of the recipients of the Royal Order of the Polar Star:

== Carl XVI Gustaf (1973–present) ==
Year	Name	Citizenship	Main occupation	Grade
May 1976	Johann Beer	Austria	Director	Knight 1st Class (RNO1kl)
December 1976	Princess Lilian, Duchess of Halland	United Kingdom/ Sweden	Princess of Sweden	Commander Grand Cross (KmstkNO)
29 August 1980	Carl O'Sullivan	Ireland	Chief of Staff of the Defence Forces (Ireland)	Knight Grand Cross
1981	Valeriu Munteanu	Romania	Lecturer	Knight 1st Class (RNO1kl)
1982	Tellervo Koivisto	Finland	Spouse of the President of Finland	Commander Grand Cross (KmstkNO)
3 May 1983	Greta Garbo	Sweden	Actress	Commander 1st Class (KNO1kl)
15 January 1985	Louis Hogan	Ireland	Chief of Staff of the Defence Forces (Ireland)	Commander
27 September 1986	Gerard O'Sullivan	Ireland	Chief of Staff of the Defence Forces (Ireland)	Commander
9 February 1987	Aníbal Cavaco Silva	Portugal	President of Portugal	Commander Grand Cross (KmstkNO)
6 October 1987	Lars-Eric Lindblad	United States/ Sweden	Entrepreneur and Explorer	Knight 1st Class (RNO1kl)
1988	Henry Segerstrom	United States	Entrepreneur	Commander (KNO)
1988	Ann-Margret	United States/ Sweden	Actress, Singer and Dancer	Commander (KNO)
1988	Linda Wallenberg	United States	Swedish Language Teacher	Commander (KNO)
1994	Eeva Ahtisaari	Finland	Spouse of the President of Finland	Commander Grand Cross (KmstkNO)
1996	Göran Wide	Finland	Mayor	Commander (KNO)
17 February 2005	Thamnoon Wanglee	Thailand	Director	Commander (KNO)
22 May 2006	Waldemar Schmidt	Denmark	Director	Knight 1st Class (RNO1kl)
10 April 2007	Mohammed Al-Amoudi	Ethiopia/ Saudi Arabia	Businessman and Sheikh	Commander 1st Class (KNO1kl)
10 April 2007	Mrs. Alice Cheng	China		Commander Grand Cross (KmstkNO)
9 May 2008	Maria Cavaco Silva	Portugal	First Lady of Portugal	Commander Grand Cross (KmstkNO)
20 November 2008	John Bruton	Ireland	Taoiseach	Commander Grand Cross
25 November 2008	Jaakko Smolander	Finland	Vice Admiral	Commander 1st Class (KNO1kl)
16 May 2009	Dan Ekholm	Finland	Editor-in-chief	Commander (KNO)
20 October 2009	Marc de Gouvenain	France	Translator	Knight 1st Class (RNO1kl)
1 February 2010	Jussi Helminen	Finland	Theater manager	Knight 1st Class (RNO1kl)
1 February 2010	Mauno Järvelä	Finland	Fiddler, Violinist and Music pedagogue.	Knight 1st Class (RNO1kl)
1 February 2010	Helena Edgren	Finland	Chief Director	Commander (KNO)
1 February 2010	Henry Wiklund	Finland	Statesman	Commander (KNO)
1 February 2010	Risto Volanen	Finland	State Secretary	Commander Grand Cross (KmstkNO)
8 March 2010	Siggi Loch	Germany	Producer	Knight 1st Class (RNO1kl)
17 March 2010	Tomaz Jervell	Portugal	Honorary Consul	Commander (KNO)
21 April 2010	Carlos de Vasconcelos	Portugal	Honorary Consul	Commander (KNO)
4 May 2010	Michael M. Wood	United States	Ambassador	Commander Grand Cross (KmstkNO)
1 June 2010	Yohei Sasakawa	Japan	Director	Commander (KNO)
23 July 2010	Choe Chong-pil	South Korea	professor	Knight 1st Class (RNO1kl)
23 July 2010	Choe Chong-dae	South Korea	Chairman	Knight 1st Class (RNO1kl)
21 October 2010	Jennifer Granholm	United States	Governor	Commander 1st Class (KNO1kl)
18 January 2011	Evelin Ilves	Estonia	First Lady of Estonia	Commander Grand Cross (KmstkNO)
4 May 2011	Anna Komorowska	Poland	First Lady of Poland	Commander Grand Cross (KmstkNO)
17 April 2012	Jenni Haukio	Finland	Spouse of the President of Finland	Commander Grand Cross (KmstkNO)
30 May 2012	Kim Yoon-Ok	South Korea	First Lady of South Korea	Commander Grand Cross (KmstkNO)
24 October 2012	Estela de Carlotto	Argentina	Human rights activist	Commander Grand Cross (KmstkNO)
6 June 2013	Christopher O'Neill	United Kingdom/ United States	Consort to Princess Madeleine, Duchess of Hälsingland and Gästrikland, as well as a Businessman	Commander (KNO)
27 June 2013	Colin Carlile	United Kingdom/ Sweden		Commander (KNO)
26 September 2013	Michael M. Kaiser	United States	Chief of the Kennedy Center	Commander (KNO)
13 May 2014	Peter Sutherland	Ireland	UN Special Envoy for Migration and Development	Commander (KNO)
9 July 2014	Antoine Cohen-Potin	France		Knight 1st Class (RNO1kl)
4 March 2015	Carl Haglund	Finland	Finlands Minister of Defence	Commander Grand Cross (KmstkNO)
12 March 2015; recalled 7 May 2019	~~Jean-Claude Arnault~~	France	Theatre director and photographer	~~Knight 1st Class (RNO1kl)~~
10 April 2015	Else Marie Friis	Denmark	professor	Member 1st Class (LNO1kl)
3 November 2016	Laura Codruţa Kövesi	Romania	Chief Prosecutor of the Romanian Anti-Corruption Agency	Commander 1st Class (KNO1kl)
14 June 2019	Kim Jung-sook	South Korea	First Lady of South Korea	Commander Grand Cross (KmstkNO)
10 December 2019	Nivaldo Luiz Rossato	Brazil	Chief of the Brazilian Air Force	Commander 1st Class (KNO1kl)
17 September 2021	Timo Kivinen	Finland	Finnish Army General	Commander Grand Cross (KmstkNO)
6 July 2022	Andrii Plakhotniuk	Ukraine	Ambassador	Commander 1st Class (KNO1kl)
1 September 2022	Tan Peng Yam	Singapore	Head Researcher of the Singaporean Ministry of Defence	Commander 1st Class (KNO1kl)
29 September 2023	Sirje Karis	Estonia	First Lady of Estonia	Commander Grand Cross (KmstkNO)
30 January 2024	Brigitte Macron	France	Spouse of the French President	Commander Grand Cross (KmstkNO)
21 March 2024	Svante Pääbo	Sweden	professor and Geneticist	Commander Grand Cross (KmstkNO)
21 March 2024	Anne L'Huillier	Sweden/ France	professor	Commander Grand Cross (KmstkNO)
21 March 2024	Catarina Wingren	Sweden	Diplomat/Third Embassy Secretary	Knight (RNO)
23 April 2024	Suzanne Innes-Stubb	Finland	First Lady of Finland	Commander Grand Cross (KmstkNO)
23 April 2024	Elina Valtonen	Finland	Minister for Foreign Affairs	Commander Grand Cross (KmstkNO)
23 April 2024	Anna-Maja Henriksson	Finland	Minister for Education	Commander Grand Cross (KmstkNO)
23 April 2024	Olli Rehn	Finland	Governor of the Bank of Finland	Commander Grand Cross (KmstkNO)
22 October 2024	Sanna Marin	Finland	Former Prime Minister of Finland	Commander Grand Cross (KmstkNO)
22 October 2024	Pekka Haavisto	Finland	Former Minister for Foreign Affairs	Commander Grand Cross (KmstkNO)
22 October 2024	Jens Stoltenberg	Norway	Former Secretary-General of NATO	Commander Grand Cross (KmstkNO)
22 October 2024	Antony Blinken	United States	71st United States Secretary of State	Commander Grand Cross (KmstkNO)
22 October 2024	Jacob Sullivan	United States	28th United States National Security Advisor	Commander Grand Cross (KmstkNO)
22 October 2024	Petri Hakkarainen	Finland	Director General at the Ministry for Foreign Affairs of Finland	Commander 1st Class (KNO1kl)
22 October 2024	Stian Jenssen	Norway	Former Chief of Staff to the Secretary-General of NATO	Commander 1st Class (KNO1kl)
22 October 2024	Julianne Smith	United States	25th United States Ambassador to NATO	Commander 1st Class (KNO1kl)
22 October 2024	Jeffry Flake	United States	Former United States Ambassador to Turkey	Commander 1st Class (KNO1kl)
22 October 2024	Amanda Sloat	United States	Former senior director, United States National Security Council	Commander 1st Class (KNO1kl)
30 April 2025	Bertil Bengtsson	Sweden	Former Justice of the Supreme Court of Sweden	Commander Grand Cross (KmstkNO)
30 April 2025	Erik Norberg	Sweden	Former National Archivist of the National Archives of Sweden	Commander 1st Class (KNO1kl)
30 April 2025	Agneta Wikman	Sweden	Associate Professor, Clinical Immunology and Transfusion Medicine, Karolinska University Hospital	Knight 1st Class (RNO1kl)
30 April 2025	Majvor Östergren	Sweden	Former County Antiquarian at Gotland County Administrative Board	Knight 1st Class (RNO1kl)
30 April 2025	Sara Ålbrink	Sweden	Strategic buyer at the Swedish Armed Forces	Knight (RNO)
6 May 2025	Björn Skúlason	Iceland	First Gentleman of Iceland	Commander Grand Cross (KmstkNO)
10 March 2026	Marta Nawrocka	Poland	First Lady of Poland	Commander Grand Cross (KmstkNO)
17 May 2026	Narendra Modi	India	Prime Minister of India	Commander Grand Cross (KmstkNO)

== See also ==
- Orders, decorations, and medals of Sweden
- List of knights of the Order of the Seraphim
- List of recipients of the Order of the Sword (from 2023)
