= Evelin Ilves =

Former first Lady of Estonia

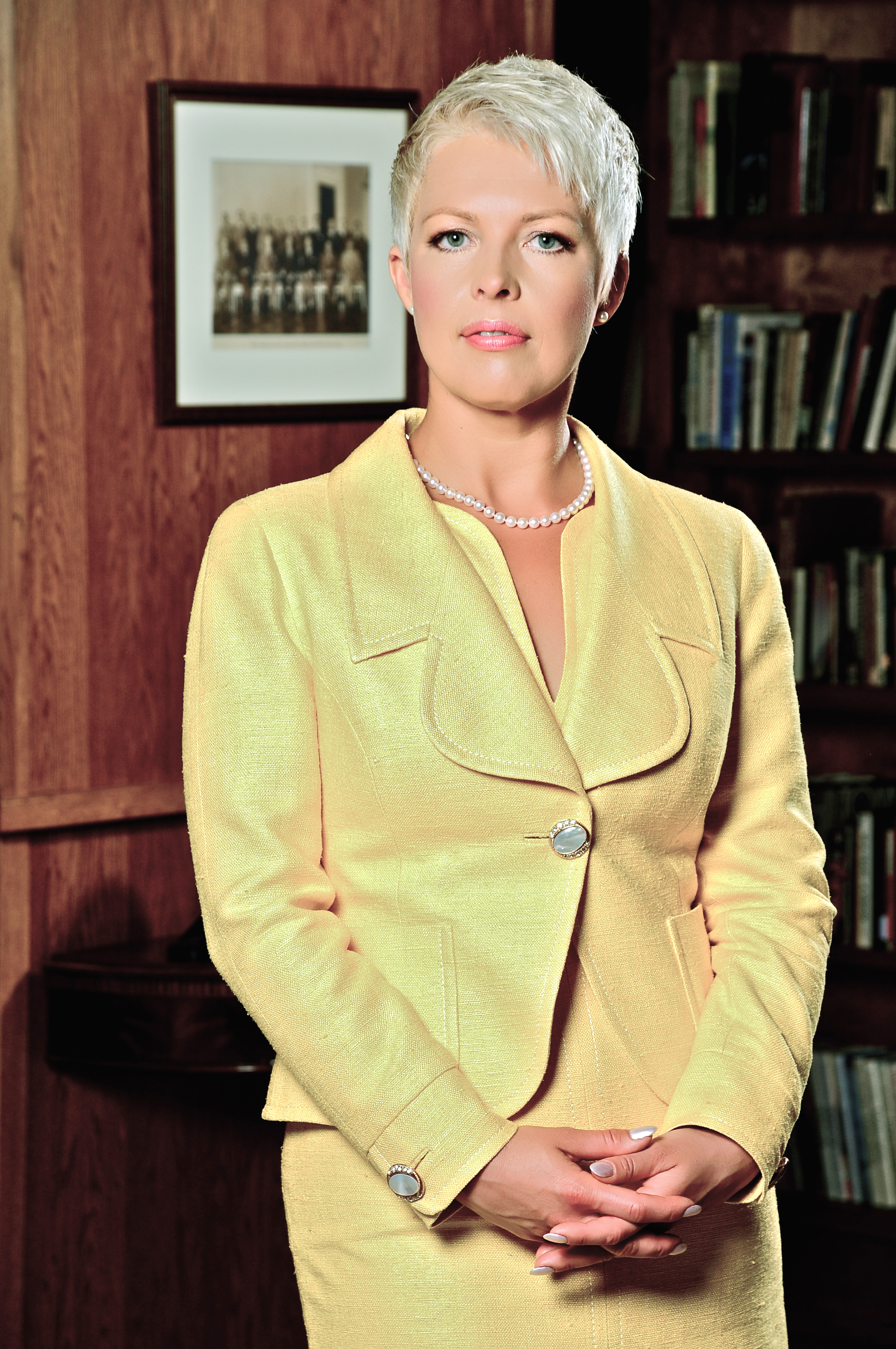

First Lady of Estonia
- In role 9 October 2006 – 30 April 2015
- President: Toomas Hendrik Ilves
- Preceded by: Ingrid Rüütel
- Succeeded by: Ieva Ilves

Personal details
- Born: Evelin Int; 20 April 1968 (age 58) Saku, Estonia
- Party: Greens (since 2019)
- Spouses: Karli Lambot (m. 1992; div. 1997) Toomas Hendrik Ilves (m. 2004; div. 2015)
- Children: 1

Evelin Ilves (née Int, formerly Int-Lambot; born 20 April 1968) is the second wife of President of Estonia Toomas Hendrik Ilves. She was the First Lady of Estonia from 9 October 2006 until their divorce on 30 April 2015.

She was president of the Estonian Rollerskating Federation from 2008 to 2014.

== Early life ==
Ilves grew up in Tallinn and graduated from Saku Gymnasium in 1986. In 1993, she received a bachelor's degree in medicine from Tartu University. She is a member of Estonian female corporation Filiae Patriae.

== Career ==
In her professional life, Ilves has worked in advertising and public relations; she was marketing director of the newspaper Eesti Päevaleht from 1996 to 2001. From 2001 to 2002, she worked for Enterprise Estonia, leading the Brand Estonia project which developed the slogan and logo Welcome to Estonia.

In 2005, she began a business project of developing a guesthouse in Ärma farm, located in Abja Parish. The farm has belonged to Toomas Hendrik Ilves's ancestors since the 18th century.

As First Lady, Ilves championed a number of initiatives supporting children, health, and the advancement of women. She took part in numerous international state visits.

== Personal life ==
She married her partner, Toomas Hendrik Ilves, in 2004 after a five-year relationship. They have one daughter, Kadri Keiu (born 2003). She was previously married to Karli Lambot between 1992 and 1997.

On 22 August 2014, footage of Ilves kissing a younger man at a cafe in Tallinn appeared in the Estonian media. Ilves later responded on her own Facebook page, requesting forgiveness from those she had hurt. Two days later it was reported that Ilves had left Estonia for Germany with her daughter. Ilves's consort was named as one Vincent Aranega, allegedly a French national.

Ilves subsequently returned to public duties, and was present at the official visit of Turkish President Recep Tayyip Erdoğan and Crown Princess Victoria and Prince Daniel of Sweden, in addition to appearing on the front cover of the November edition of the Estonian edition of Hello magazine.

Evelin and Toomas Hendrik Ilves were divorced on 30 April 2015.

== Honours ==
- Belgium: Dame Grand Cross of the Order of the Crown
- Latvia: Grand Cross of the Order of the Three Stars
- Finland: Grand Cross of the Order of the White Rose
- Spain: Dame Grand Cross of the Order of Isabella the Catholic
- Netherlands: Grand Cross of the Order of the Crown
- Sweden: Member Grand Cross of the Royal Order of the Polar Star

Honorary titles
Preceded by Ingrid Rüütel	First Lady of Estonia; 2006–2015	Succeeded by Ieva Ilves
