= Enterprise Estonia =

Entrepreneurship and regional development foundation in Estonia

Enterprise Estonia (Estonian: Ettevõtluse Arendamise Sihtasutus, abbreviated EAS) is an Estonian national foundation (Estonian: sihtasutus) which goal is to develop economy of Estonia. For developing it aims to three principal areas of activity:

to develop Estonian enterprises and to increase export capacity;
to enhance tourism;
to bring high value-added foreign investments to Estonia.

== Enterprise ==
=== Purpose and internal guidelines ===
The organization's purpose is to promote business and economically profitable business development throughout the country, and stimulate the business opportunities of districts and regions by contributing to innovation, internationalization and profiling. The main guidelines for the Entrepreneurship Development Fund in Estonia are in business and regional policy.

The Entrepreneurship Development Fund in Estonia's instruments and services aims to create more good entrepreneurs, more vibrant companies and more innovative business environments.

=== Leadership and governance ===
Chairman of the board:

- Peeter Raudsepp (2019 - )
- Alo Ivask (2017–2019)
- Hanno Tomberg (2014-2016)
- Taavi Laur 2013-2014
- Ülari Alamets (2007-2012)

Chairman of the Supervisory Board:

- Kersti Männik (2020–2020)
- Arvi Lossmann (2019-2020)
- Erki Mölder (2014–2019)
- Cinzia Siig (2012-2014)

== Organization ==
Enterprise Estonia was established in 2000. It was created by joining up all government controlled export, foreign investment, technology, regional development and tourism agencies.

- Total number of employees is approx. 266.
- The budget for 2019 is 81.3 million euros.
- A network in each county of Estonia: a regional representation office in Tartu and Pärnu, along with nearby cooperation partners, regional development centres and tourist information centres.
- Foreign representative offices in Helsinki, Stockholm, Oslo, Copenhagen, Hamburg, Amsterdam, London, Paris, Kyiv, Astana, Dubai, New Delhi, Beijing, Tokyo, Singapore and Silicon Valley as well as New York City in US.

== Activities ==
In 2001, Evelin Int-Lambot, a spouse of Toomas Hendrik Ilves at the time, was hired as project lead in EAS but after working there 4 months, she did not have an idea what was her job in EAS.

In 2002, EAS launched brand "Welcome to Estonia!". The idea behind this was carried forward by the notion that Estonia has changed a lot since the reestablishing independence and the change and success should be advertised more in the world. The brand was ordered from Interbrand Newell and Sorrell Ltd and the coordinator and project manager on the Estonian side was Evelin Int-Lambot. Development took 2 years, from 2000 to 2002, and did cost 13,3 EEK. Brand was mainly used on info-materials meant for tourists. Part of the brand "Positively transforming" posters were used in Tallinn but this was later cancelled due to the fact that Estonia became one of the top 5 countries in Europe with HIV spread and the positive transformation gained another meaning. Project manager Evelin Int-Lambot did quit her job in December 2002 The project was deemed failure afterwards by a scientific study in 2005 and 13 years later launching it, in 2015, EAS acknowledged that the brand may belong to the dustbin and new one should be developed for the Estonian 100th Anniversary
