= Helle Meri =

Estonian actress (1949–2024)

Helle Meri (née Pihlak; 14 March 1949 – 8 November 2024) was an Estonian actress who also served as the First Lady of Estonia from 1992 to 2001 as the wife of Lennart Meri.

== Life and career ==
Meri was born in Rapla, Soviet-occupied Estonia, where she also went to school. In her spare time she actively participated in different sports and played basketball.

After secondary school, Meri went on to study at the Stage School of Tallinn Conservatory. Before serving as the First Lady, she played in the Estonian Drama Theatre from 1972 up until 1992 when Lennart Meri became the Estonian Ambassador to Finland prior to his nine years of presidency. The couple married in 1992 when her acting career came to an end.

In theatre, Meri had roles in numerous classical pieces to a good critical acclaim, including the pieces by Estonian playwrights like August Kitzberg, A. H. Tammsaare, Jaan Kross and Jaan Kruusvall among many. She had roles also in musicals, in children's plays and in film.

Prior to her marriage, Meri was in relationships with actor Jaak Tamleht and composer Eino Tamberg. Meri has one daughter, Tuule (born 1985).

Meri was patron of the Estonian SOS Children's Village in Keila. She died on 8 November 2024, at the age of 75.

Preceded by Alice Mark	First Lady of Estonia; 1992–2001	Succeeded by Ingrid Rüütel
