= Order of the Polar Star =

Swedish order of chivalry

Royal Order of the Polar Star Kungliga Nordstjärneorden
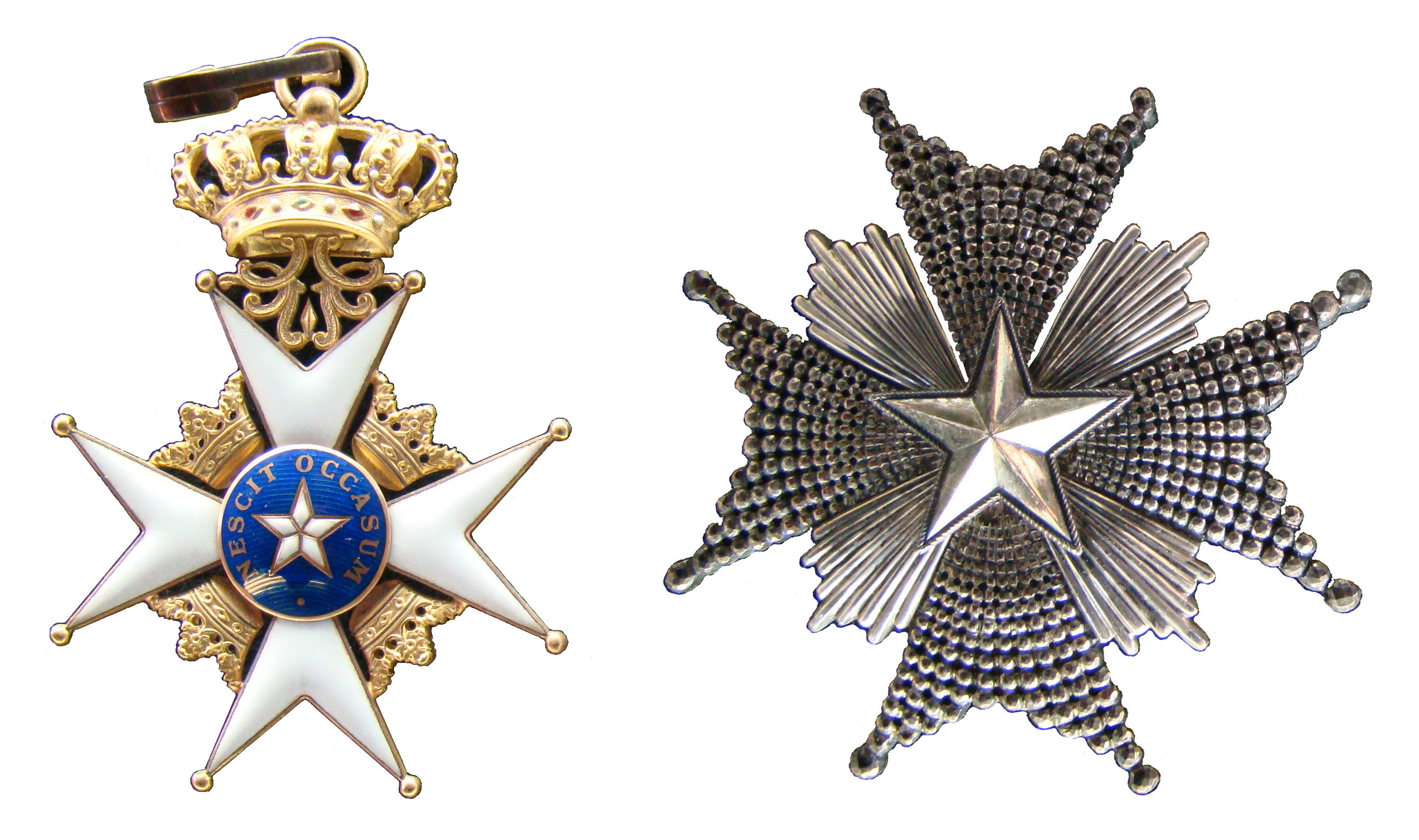
- Cross and star of the order

Awarded by the monarch of Sweden
- Type: Five grade order of merit
- Royal house: Bernadotte
- Motto: Nescit Occasum (It knows no decline)
- Eligibility: Swedish and foreign persons
- Awarded for: Until 1975: Civic merits, for devotion to duty, for science, literary, learned and useful works and for new and beneficial institutions. After 1975: Services to Sweden
- Status: Currently constituted
- Sovereign: King Carl XVI Gustaf
- Chancellor: Svante Lindqvist
- Grades: Commander Grand Cross (KmstkNO); Commander 1st Class (KNO1kl); Commander (KNO); Knight/Member 1st Class (RNO1kl); Knight/Member (RNO)

Statistics
- First induction: 1748
- Last induction: 17 May 2026

Precedence
- Next (higher): Royal Order of the Sword
- Next (lower): Royal Order of Vasa
- 1748–1975 (all recipients); 2013–2023 (Swedish princes only); 2023–present (all recipients) 1975–2023 (foreign recipients); Ribbon bars of the order

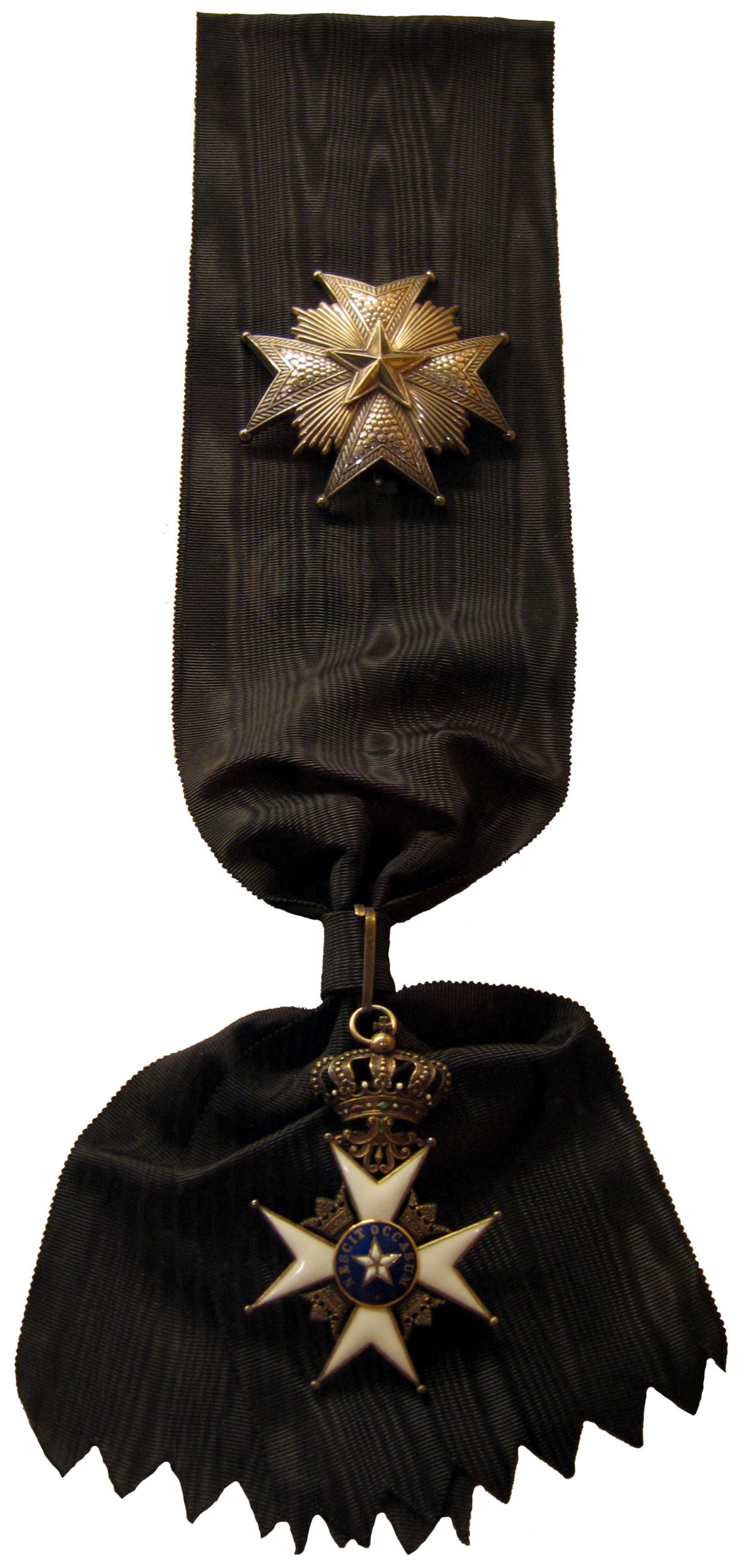
Cross, ribbon and star of a Commander Grand Cross

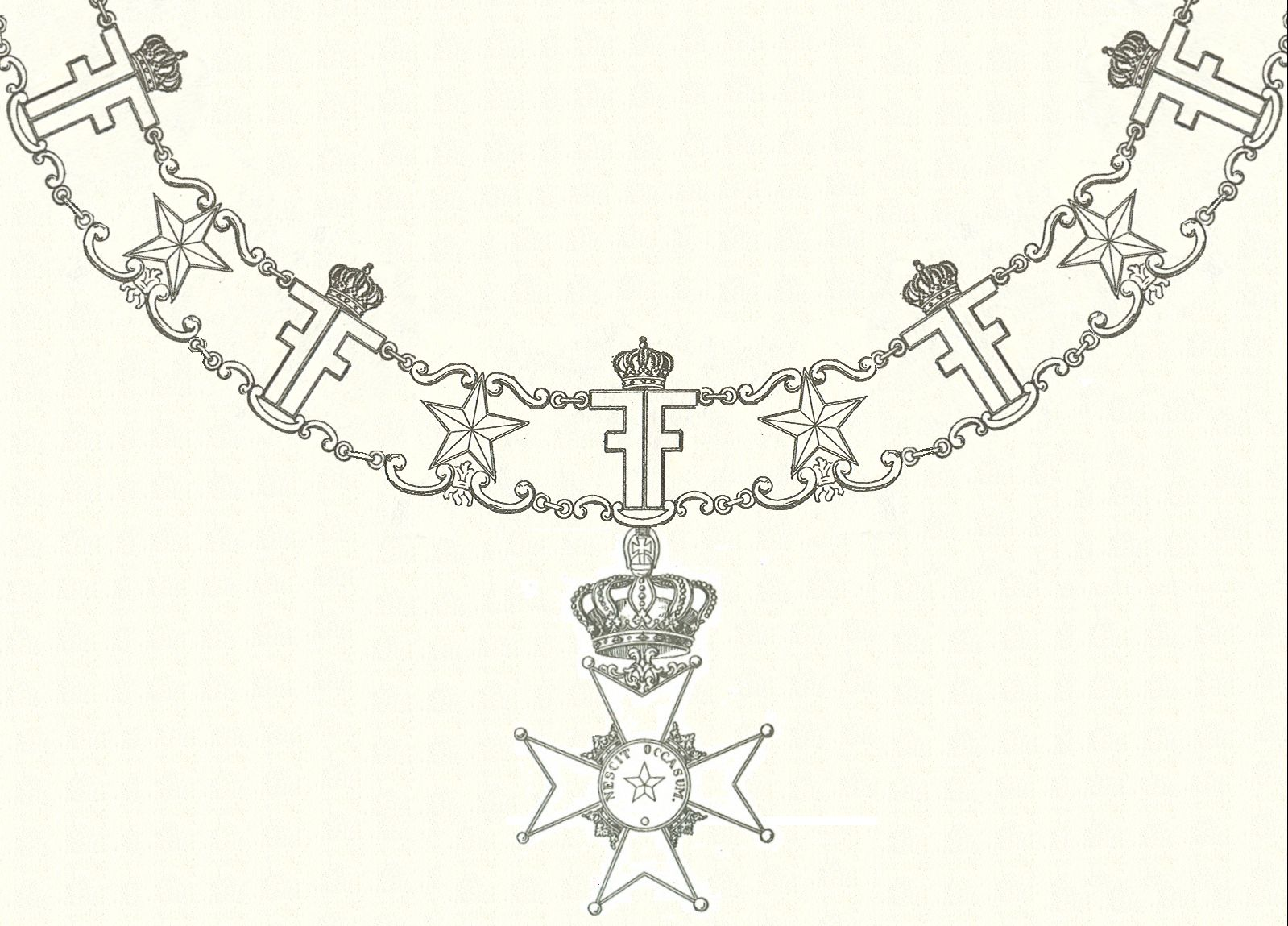
Collar of the Order of the Polar Star and the badge of the order

The Royal Order of the Polar Star (Swedish: Kungliga Nordstjärneorden), sometimes translated as the Royal Order of the North Star, is a Swedish order of chivalry created by King Frederick I on 23 February 1748, together with the Order of the Sword and the Order of the Seraphim. The Order of the Polar Star is intended as a reward for Swedish and foreign "civic merits, for devotion to duty, for science, literary, learned and useful works and for new and beneficial institutions".

Its motto is, as seen on the blue enameled centre of the badge, Nescit Occasum, a Latin phrase meaning "It knows no decline". This is to represent that Sweden is as constant as a never setting star. The Order's colour is black. This was chosen so that when wearing the black sash, the white, blue and golden cross would stand out and shine as the light of enlightenment from the black surface. The choice of black for the Order's ribbon may also have been inspired by the black ribbon of the French Order of St. Michael, which at the time the Order of the Polar Star was instituted was also awarded to meritorious civil servants. From 1975–2023, the ribbon of the Order was blue with yellow stripes near the edges (i.e., the national colors, but the reverse of the Order of the Sword's yellow ribbon with blue stripes near the edges). The black ribbon was reintroduced in 2023 when guidelines to once again award Swedish honours to Swedish citizens were introduced. Women and clergymen are not called Knight or Commander, but simply Member (Ledamot).

From the reorganization of the orders in 1975 until 2023, the Order was only awarded to foreigners and members of the royal family, often being awarded to foreign office holders (such as prime and senior ministers) during Swedish state visits. It is also awarded to junior members of royal families who would not qualify for the more prestigious Royal Order of the Seraphim. In 2019, a parliamentary committee was instructed to establish guidelines on how to reintroduce the Swedish orders, including the Order of the Polar Star, into the Swedish honours system, and how Swedish citizens again can be appointed to Swedish orders. The committee presented its findings in September 2021 and the Government declared that a bill on the subject would be presented to the Riksdag on 19 April 2022. The bill passed the Riksdag by a large majority on 19 June 2022. On 20 December 2022, the Swedish Government published a new regulation that repealed the 1974 regulation, and once again opened the Royal Orders to Swedish citizens and reactivated the Order of the Sword and the Order of Vasa, which came in effect on 1 February 2023.

It was first awarded again in 2024 when Svante Pääbo among others were appointed to the order.

== Grades ==
The Order has five degrees:

1. Commander Grand Cross (KmstkNO) – Wears the badge on a collar (chain) or on a sash over the right shoulder, plus the star on the left chest;
2. Commander 1st Class (KNO1kl) – Wears the badge on a necklet, plus the star on the left chest;
3. Commander (KNO) – Wears the badge on a necklet;
4. Knight 1st Class (RNO1kl) – Wears the badge on a ribbon on the left chest;
5. Knight (RNO) – Wears the badge on a ribbon on the left chest.

Before 2023, clergymen and women were not called Knight, but instead made a Ledamot av andliga ståndet ("Member of the Cloth") for clergymen or a Ledamot ("Member") for women. However, since 2023, the Order makes no distinction between men and women.

The Order also has a medal: the "Polar Star Medal".

== Investiture ==
Before 1975 each royal order had their own investiture ceremony. When the royal orders were reinstated, however, this practice was not restored. Instead a new state ceremony was created in which all recipients of all orders are awarded. The new ceremony is held in the White Sea Hall of the Stockholm Palace, decorated with the banners and insignia of the royal orders. After the King and Queen are announced by the Herald of the Royal Orders, tapping his staff on the floor twice, and make their entrance to the Seraphim March, the Chancellor of the Royal Orders makes an introduction speech and the King himself delivers a speech each recipient of all orders are, one by one, one order at a time from highest to lowest in rank, announced and called upon by the Deputy Chancellor of the Royal Orders to receive their insignia from the King and shake his hand. After all recipients of a certain order have received their award, the fanfare of that order is performed before the investiture of members of the next order begins. This ceremony was first held on 31 May 2024.

== Insignia and habit ==
- The collar of the Order is in gold, consists of eleven white-enamelled five-pointed stars and eleven crowned back-to-back monogram "F"s (for King Frederick I of Sweden) in blue enamel, joined by chains.
- The badge of the Order is a white enamelled Maltese Cross, in silver for a Knight and in gilt for a Knight 1st Class and above; crowns appear between the arms of the cross. The central disc, which is identical on both sides, is in blue enamel, with a white-enamelled five-pointed star surrounded by the Order's motto Nescit occasum ("It knows no decline"). The badge hangs from a royal crown.
- The star of the Order is a silver Maltese cross, with a silver five-pointed star at the centre. The star of a Grand Cross also has straight silver rays between the arms of the cross.
- The ribbon of the Order is black. From 1975–2023 it was blue with yellow stripes near its borders (see above). In spring 2013, the Grand Master decided that Swedish royal princes would wear the Order with the original black ribbon, while other members would still use the blue with yellow stripes. From 2023, the black ribbon was used again. The last black ribbon 18kt gold Knight class prior to 2023 was awarded in 1988 to historian George Loper of Bridgeton, New Jersey, for his research which was the basis for the New Sweden Farmstead Museum. This was presented by the King.
- The Order used to have a distinctive red and white habit worn on formal occasions such as at chapters of the Order. The habit included red breeches and red doublet, both with padded shoulders and white piping, a white sash with a gold fringe around the waist and a red mantle with white lining. The star of the Order was embroidered on the left breast of both the doublet and the mantle. A black top hat with a gold hat band and a plume of white ostrich and black egret feathers and red boots with gilded spurs completed the habit. The collar of the Order was worn over the shoulders of the doublet. Clergymen of the Church of Sweden wore the Order around the neck with a white cassock with a red sash with a gold fringe around the waist and a red mantle with a white lining and with the star of the Order embroidered on its left side.

Ribbon bars (1748–1975; 2023–present)
Commander Grand Cross	Commander 1st Class	Commander	Knight 1st Class	Knight

Ribbon bars (1975–2023)
Commander Grand Cross	Commander 1st Class	Commander	Knight 1st Class	Knight

== Recipients (since 2023) ==
Year	Name	Citizenship	Main occupation	Grade
29 September 2023	Sirje Karis	Estonia	First Lady of Estonia	Commander Grand Cross (KmstkNO)
30 January 2024	Brigitte Macron	France	Spouse of the French President	Commander Grand Cross (KmstkNO)
21 March 2024	Svante Pääbo	Sweden	Professor and Geneticist	Commander Grand Cross (KmstkNO)
21 March 2024	Anne L'Huillier	Sweden/ France	Professor	Commander Grand Cross (KmstkNO)
21 March 2024	Catarina Wingren	Sweden	Diplomat/Third Embassy Secretary	Knight (RNO)
23 April 2024	Suzanne Innes-Stubb	Finland	First Lady of Finland	Commander Grand Cross (KmstkNO)
23 April 2024	Elina Valtonen	Finland	Minister for Foreign Affairs	Commander Grand Cross (KmstkNO)
23 April 2024	Anna-Maja Henriksson	Finland	Minister for Education	Commander Grand Cross (KmstkNO)
23 April 2024	Olli Rehn	Finland	Governor of the Bank of Finland	Commander Grand Cross (KmstkNO)
22 October 2024	Sanna Marin	Finland	Former Prime Minister of Finland	Commander Grand Cross (KmstkNO)
22 October 2024	Pekka Haavisto	Finland	Former Minister for Foreign Affairs	Commander Grand Cross (KmstkNO)
22 October 2024	Jens Stoltenberg	Norway	Former Secretary-General of NATO	Commander Grand Cross (KmstkNO)
22 October 2024	Antony Blinken	United States	71st United States Secretary of State	Commander Grand Cross (KmstkNO)
22 October 2024	Jacob Sullivan	United States	28th United States National Security Advisor	Commander Grand Cross (KmstkNO)
22 October 2024	Petri Hakkarainen	Finland	Director General at the Ministry for Foreign Affairs of Finland	Commander 1st Class (KNO1kl)
22 October 2024	Stian Jenssen	Norway	Former Chief of Staff to the Secretary-General of NATO	Commander 1st Class (KNO1kl)
22 October 2024	Julianne Smith	United States	25th United States Ambassador to NATO	Commander 1st Class (KNO1kl)
22 October 2024	Jeffry Flake	United States	Former United States Ambassador to Turkey	Commander 1st Class (KNO1kl)
22 October 2024	Amanda Sloat	United States	Former senior director, United States National Security Council	Commander 1st Class (KNO1kl)
30 April 2025	Bertil Bengtsson	Sweden	Former Justice of the Supreme Court of Sweden	Commander Grand Cross (KmstkNO)
30 April 2025	Erik Norberg	Sweden	Former National Archivist of the National Archives of Sweden	Commander 1st Class (KNO1kl)
30 April 2025	Agneta Wikman	Sweden	Associate Professor, Clinical Immunology and Transfusion Medicine, Karolinska University Hospital	Knight 1st Class (RNO1kl)
30 April 2025	Majvor Östergren	Sweden	Former County Antiquarian at Gotland County Administrative Board	Knight 1st Class (RNO1kl)
30 April 2025	Sara Ålbrink	Sweden	Strategic buyer at the Swedish Armed Forces	Knight (RNO)
6 May 2025	Björn Skúlason	Iceland	First Gentleman of Iceland	Commander Grand Cross (KmstkNO)
10 March 2026	Marta Nawrocka	Poland	First Lady of Poland	Commander Grand Cross (KmstkNO)
17 May 2026	Narendra Modi	India	Prime Minister of India	Commander Grand Cross (KmstkNO)

== Gallery ==
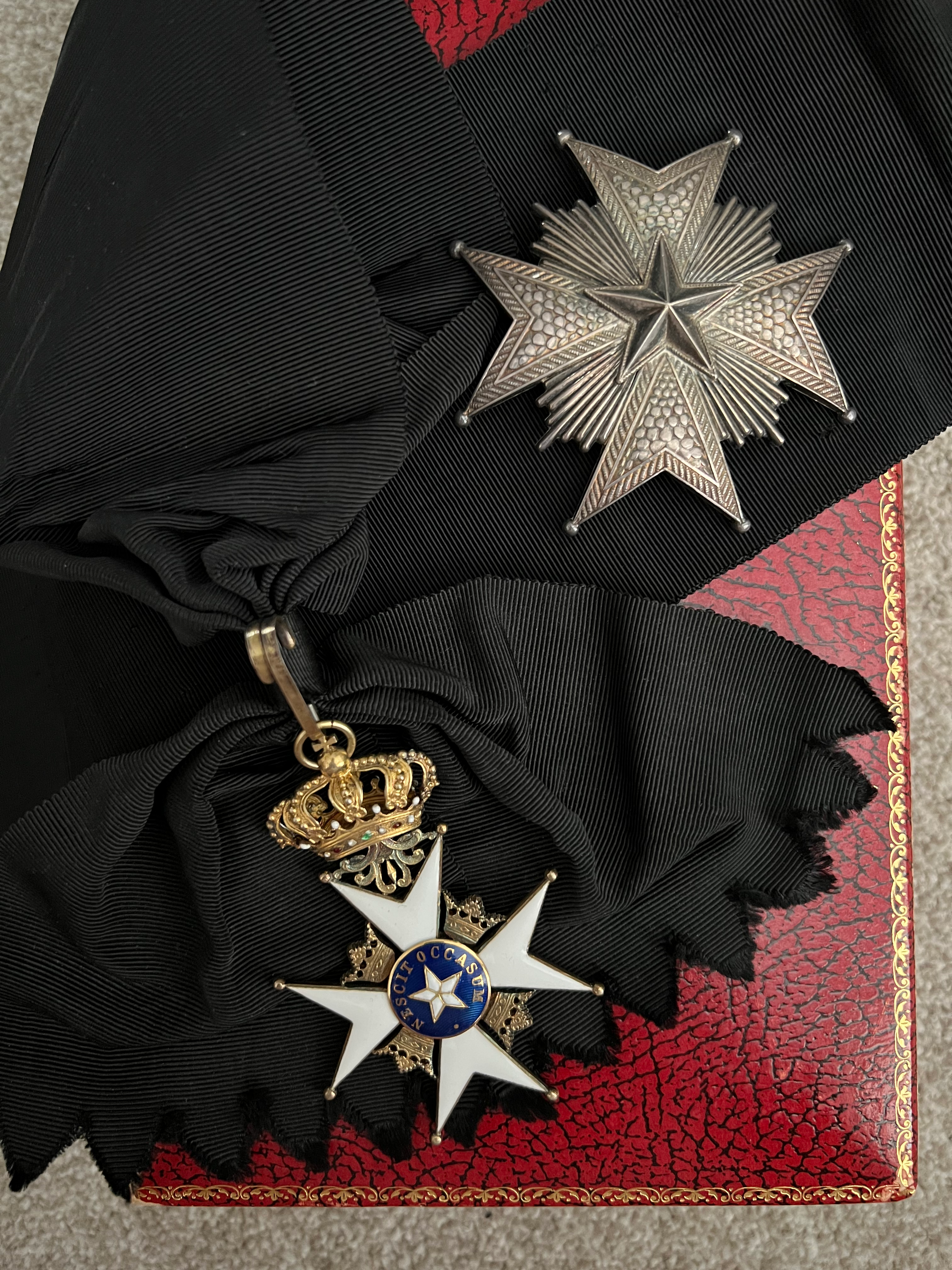
Grand Cross set of insignia

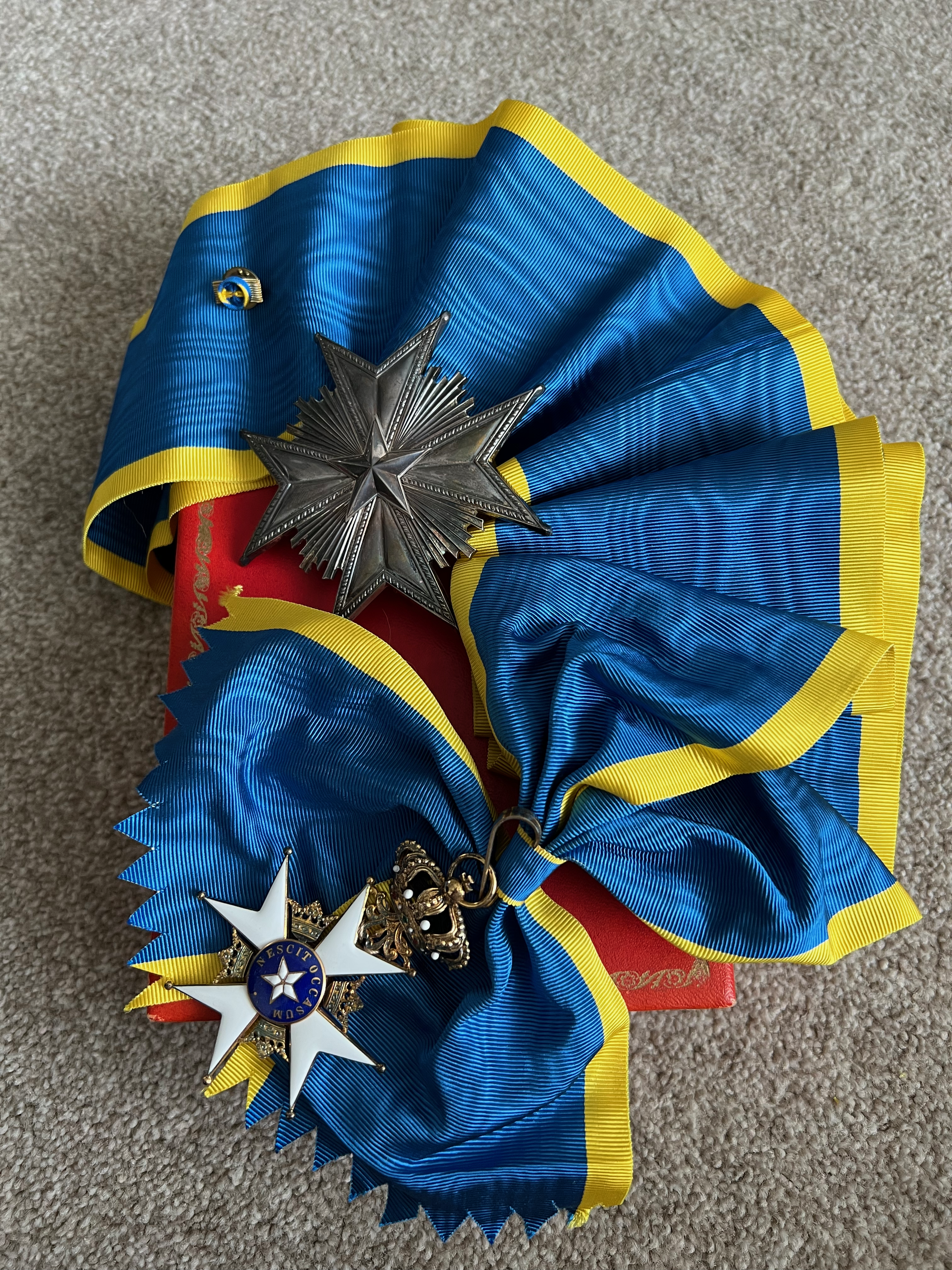
Grand Cross set of insignia (1975–2023)

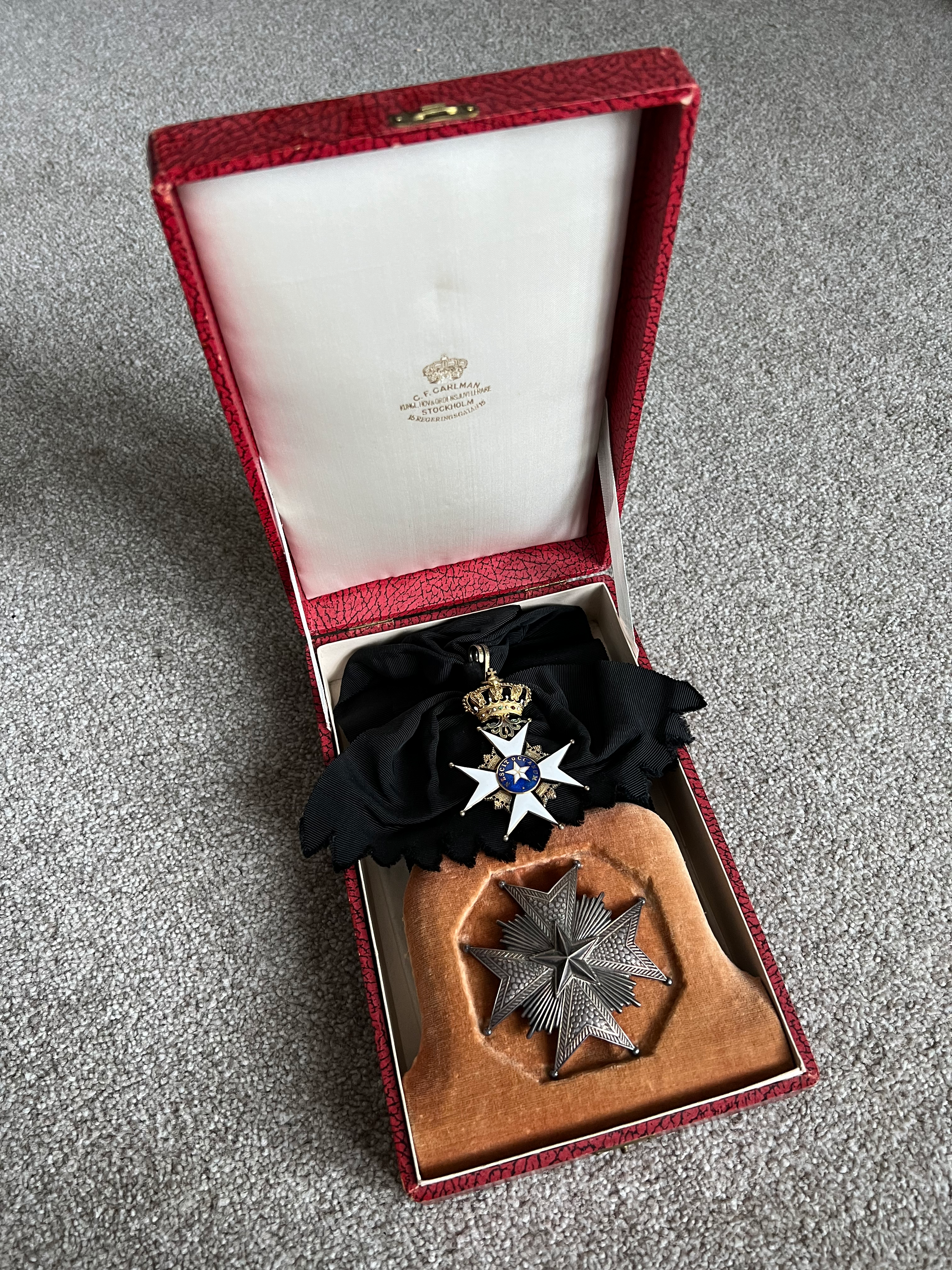
Grand Cross in its case of issue

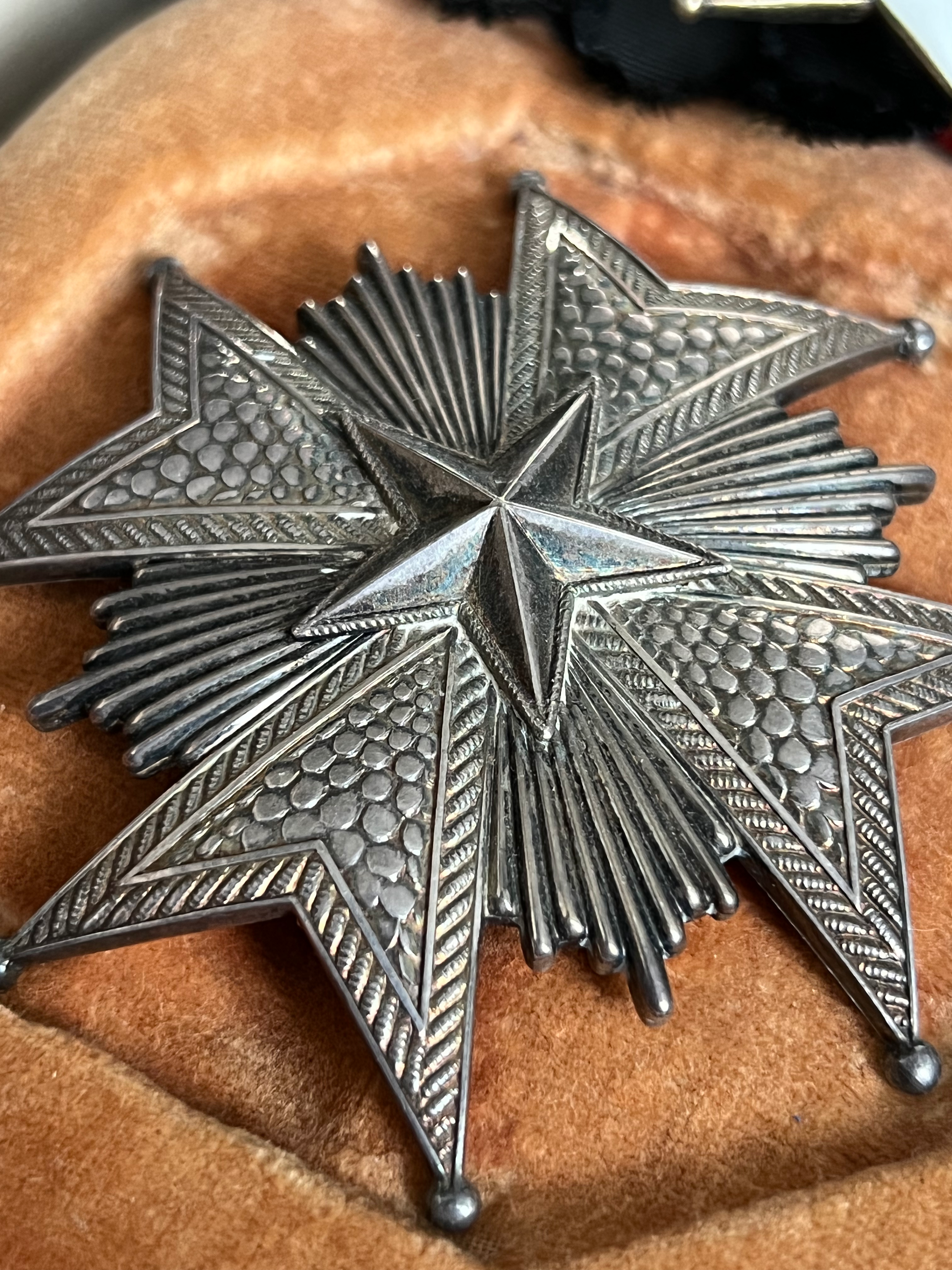
Grand Cross breast star

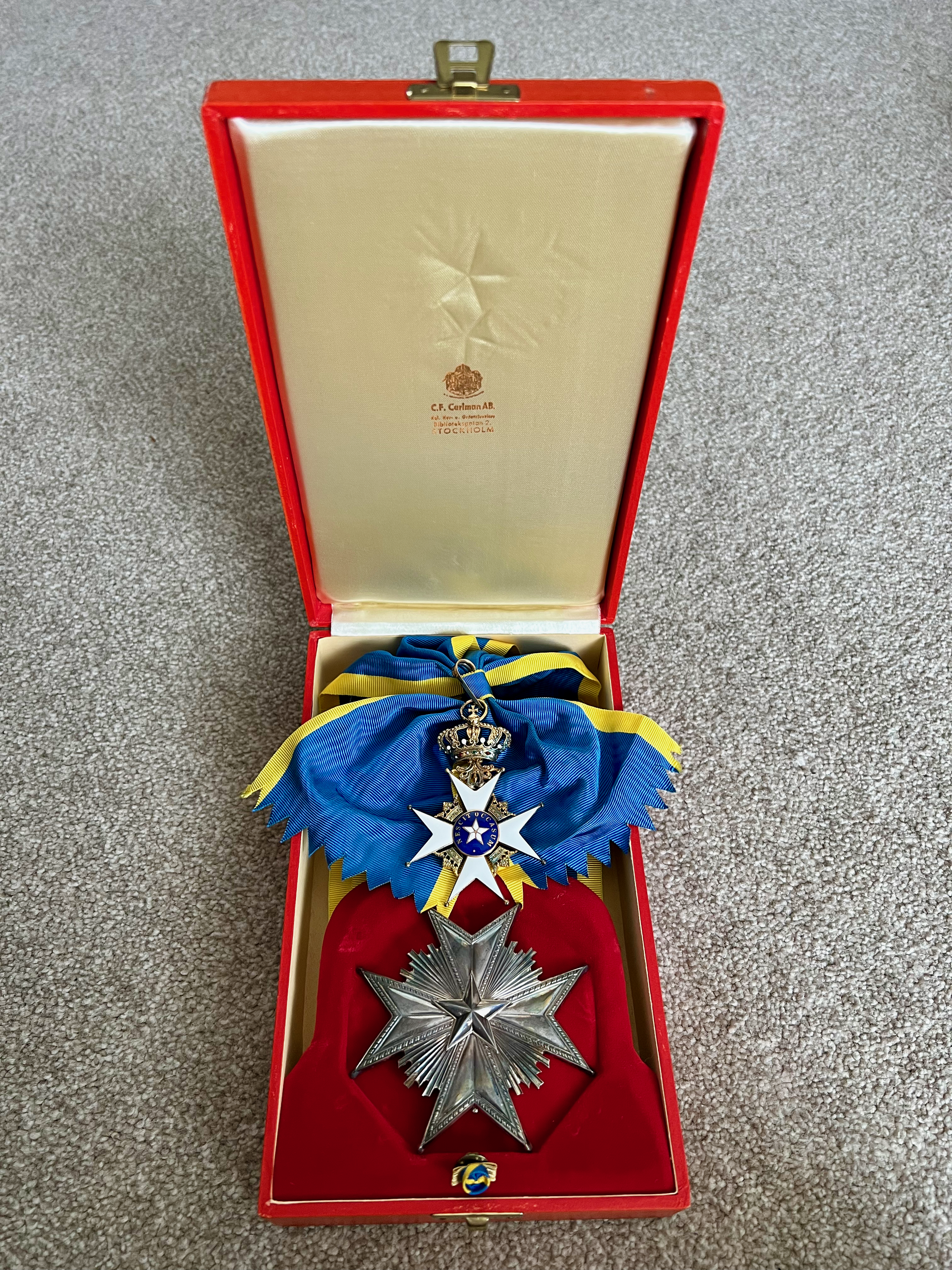
Grand Cross in its case of issue

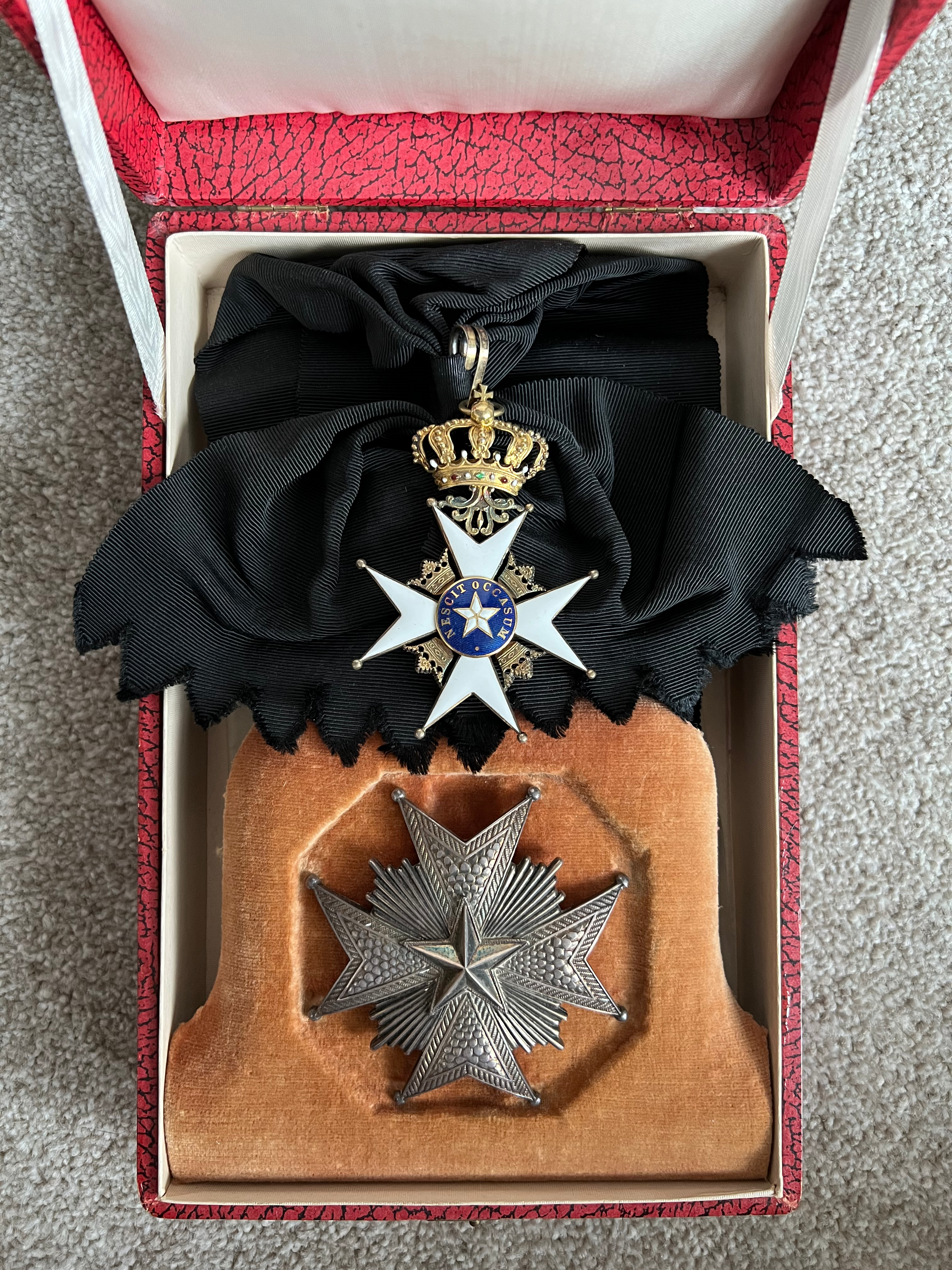
Set of the Grand Cross

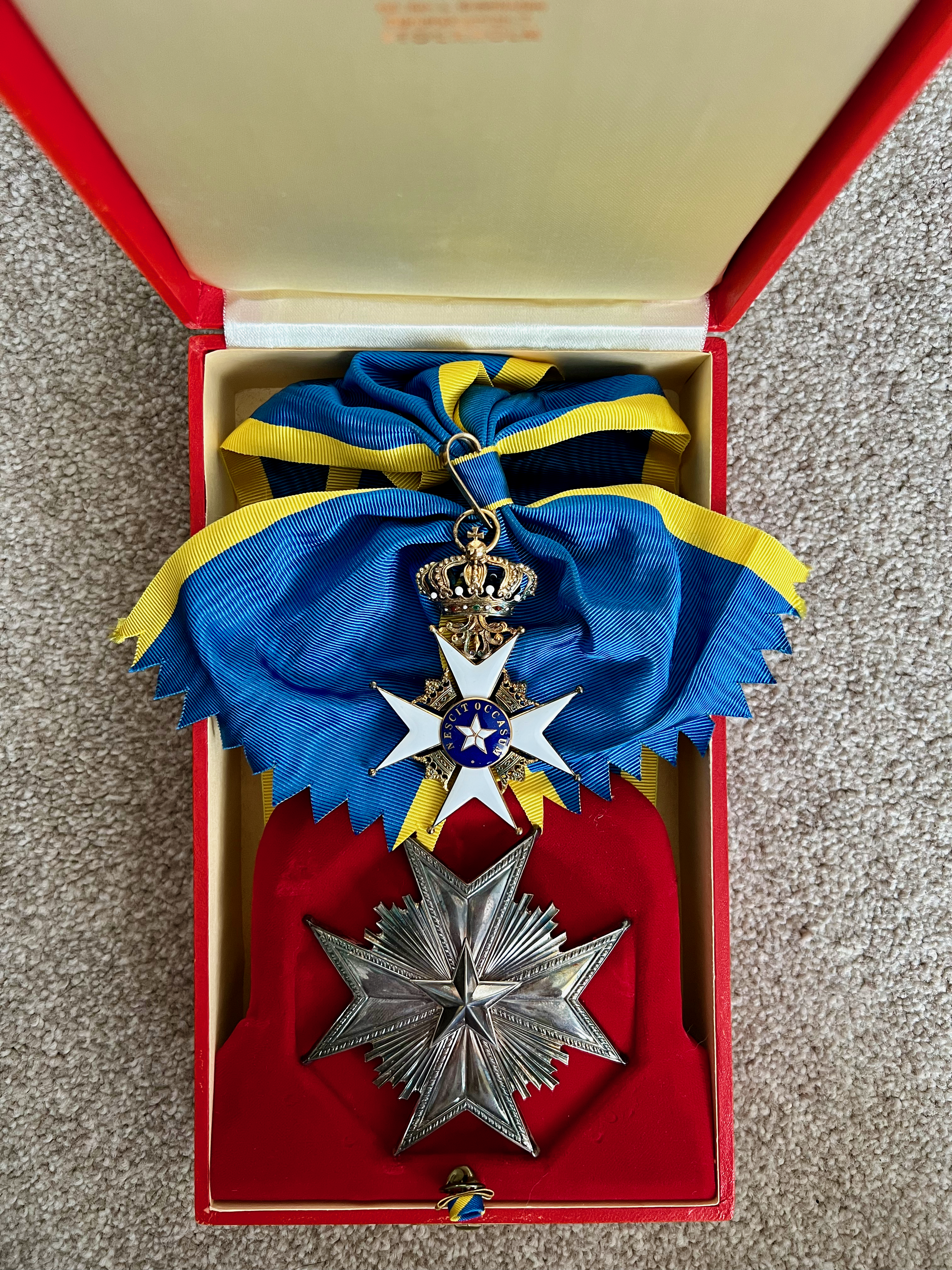
Set of the Grand Cross (1975–2023)

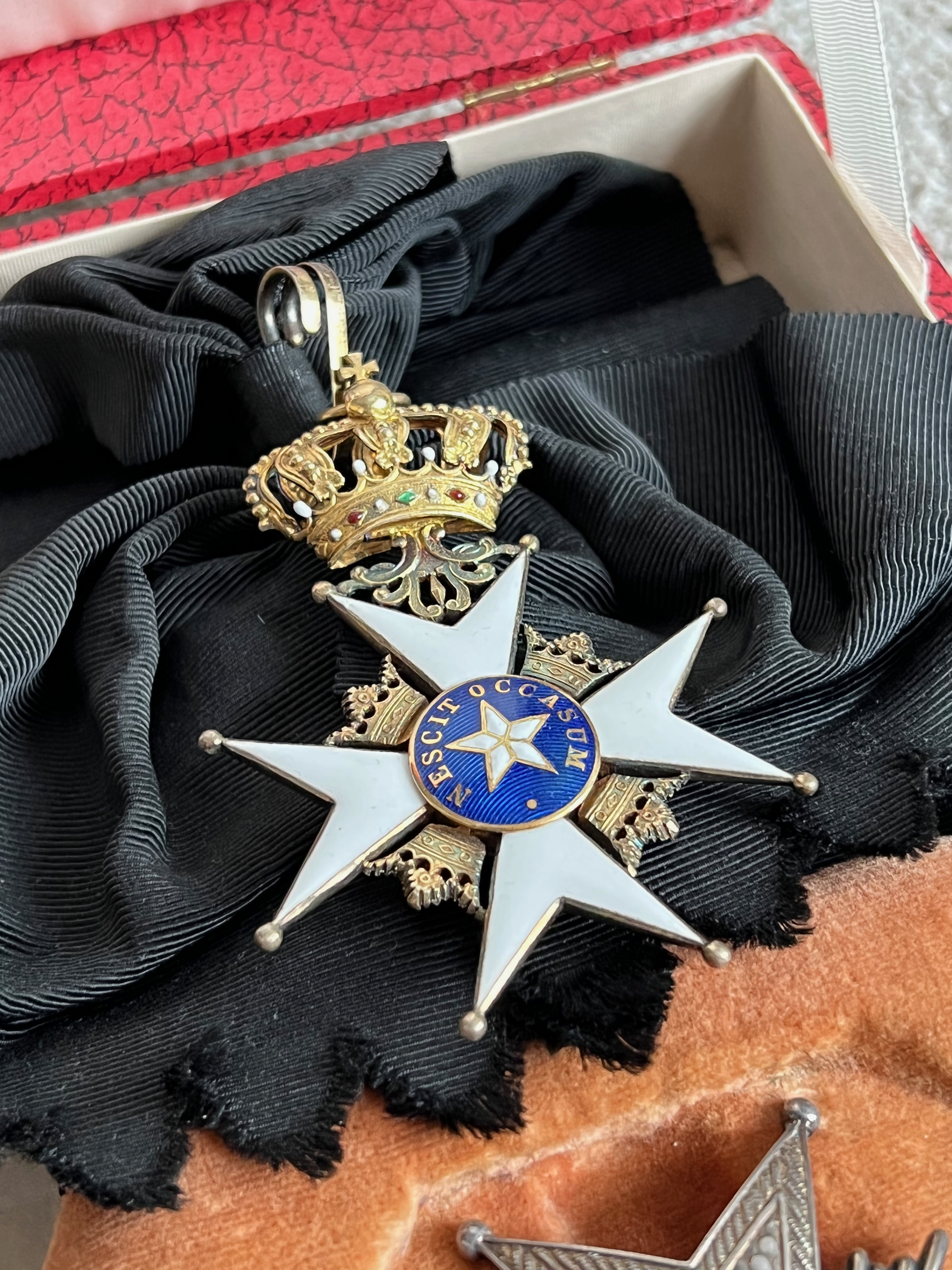
Badge of the Grand Cross

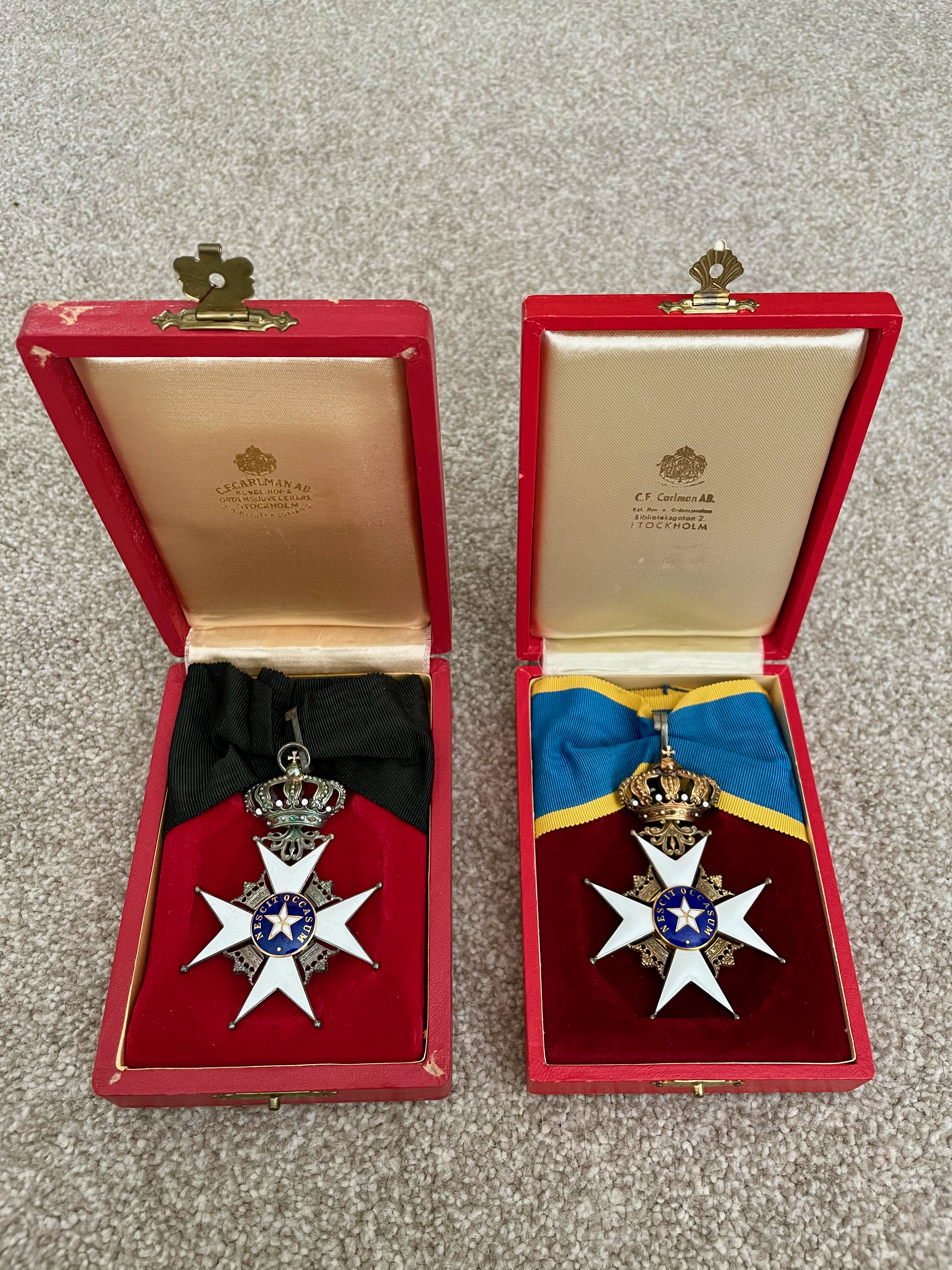
Pre and Post-1975 sets of the Commander grade of the Order

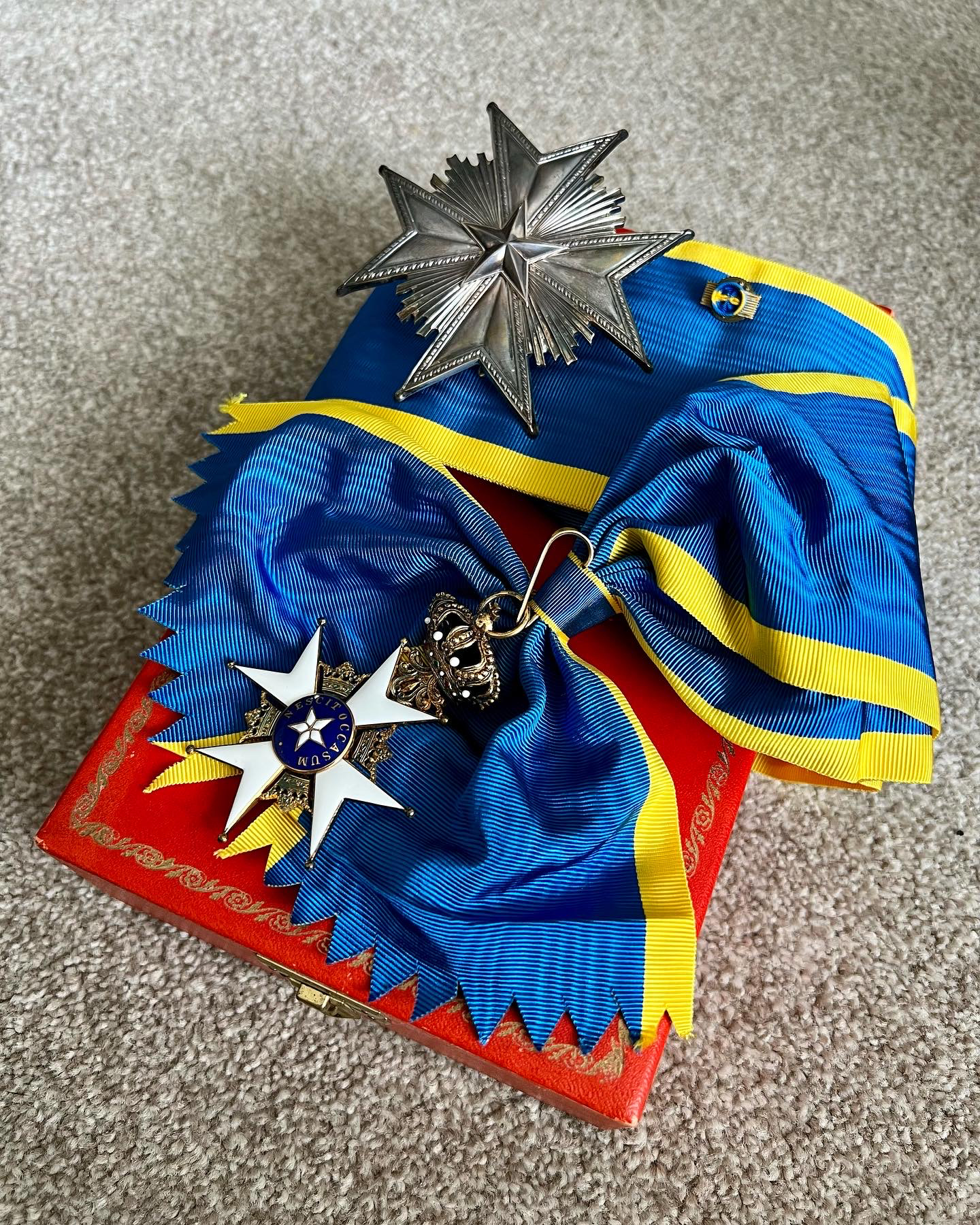
Grand Cross (1975–2023)

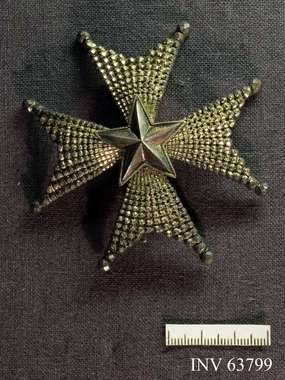
Grand Officer (Commander 1st Class) Star of the Order

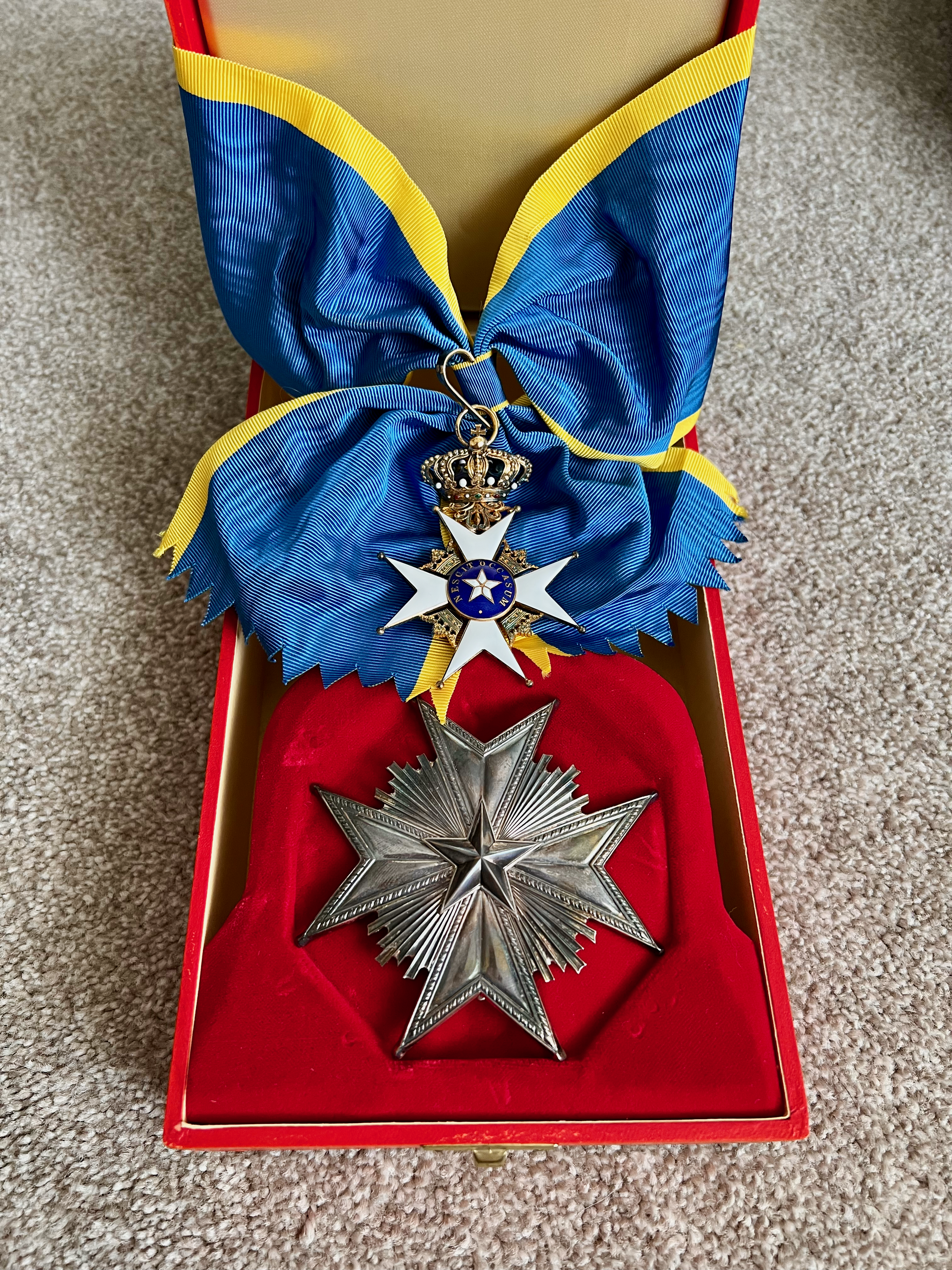
Grand Cross in its case of issue

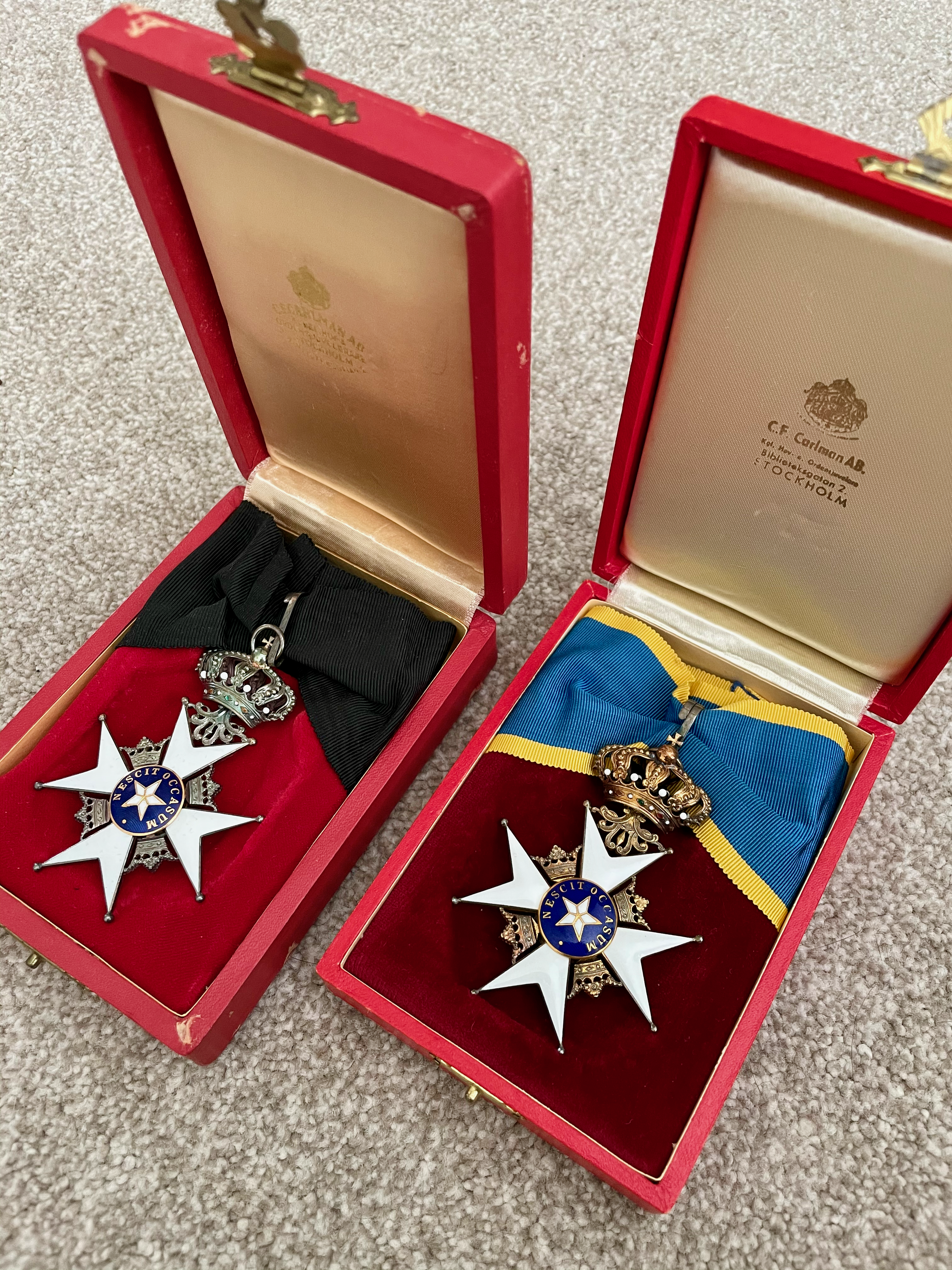
Pre and Post-1975 sets of the Commander grade of the Order

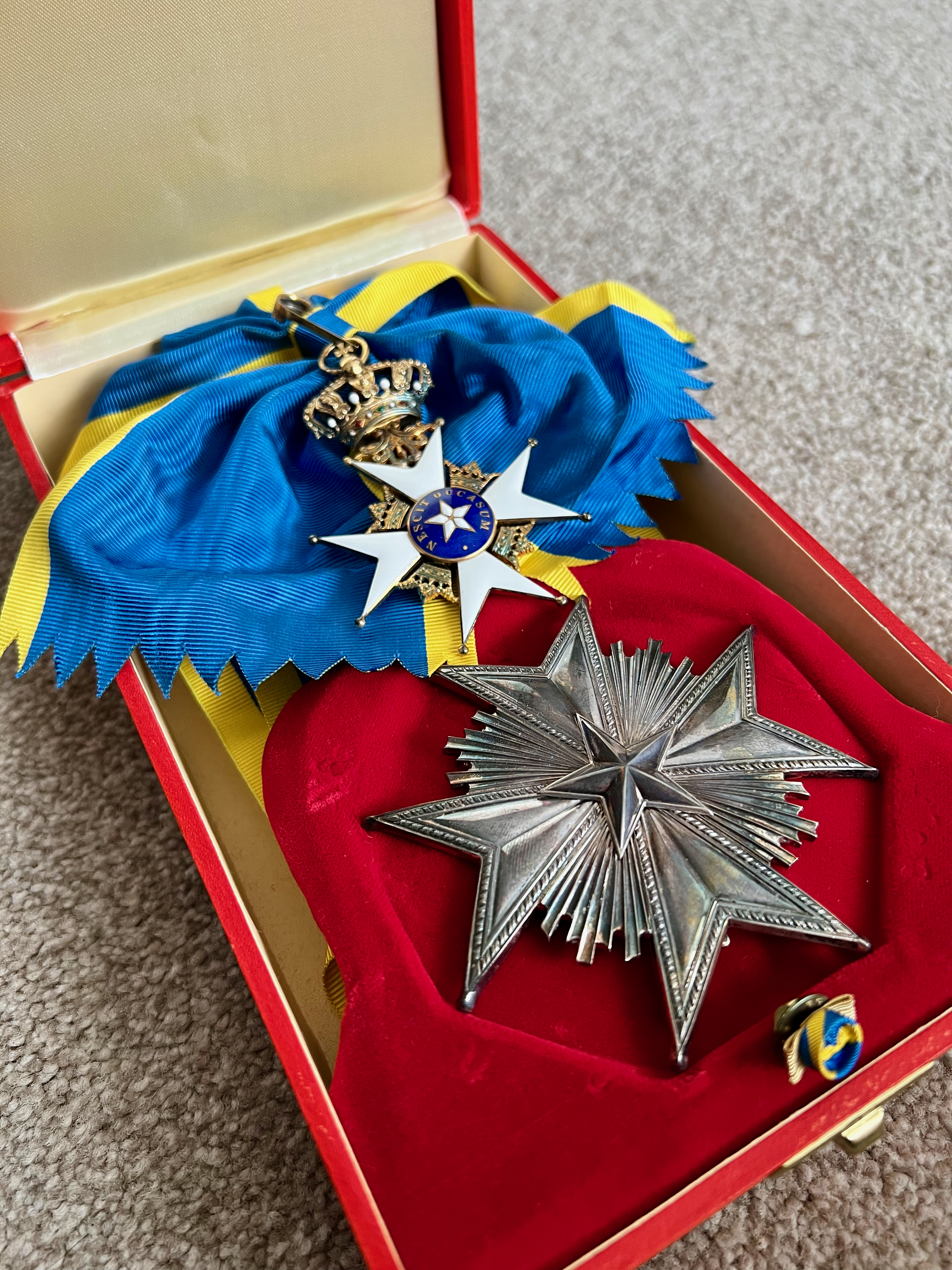
Grand Cross in its case of issue (1975–2023)

== See also ==
- Orders, decorations, and medals of Sweden
- List of recipients of the Order of the Polar Star
