= Georgi-Rene Maksimovski =

Spouse of former president of Estonia

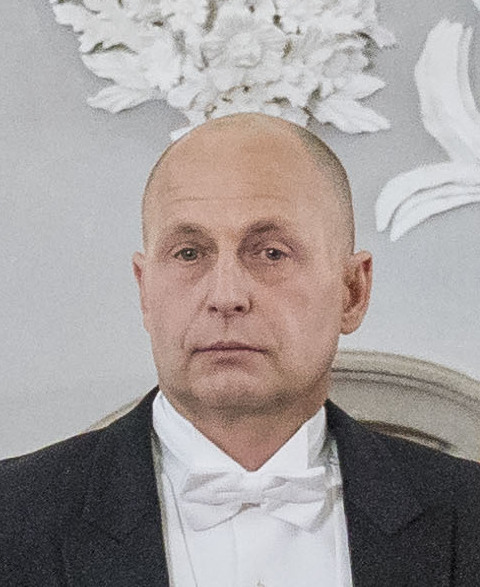
- Maksimovski at the inaugural presidential reception, 10 October 2016

First Gentleman of Estonia
- In role 10 October 2016 – 11 October 2021
- President: Kersti Kaljulaid
- Preceded by: Ieva Ilves (as First Lady)
- Succeeded by: Sirje Karis (as First Lady)

Personal details
- Born: 22 July 1966 (age 60)
- Spouse: Kersti Kaljulaid (m. 2011)
- Children: 2
- Education: Tallinn University of Technology

Georgi-Rene Maksimovski (born 22 July 1966) is an Estonian spouse of the president. Since 2011, he is married to Kersti Kaljulaid who was the first female President of the Republic of Estonia in 2016–2021.

Maksimovski was born into an Estonian Seto family, he is one of the two children of father Nektari and mother Valve Maksimovski. In 1984–1991, he studied at the Tallinn University of Technology. Maksimovski worked at the Estonian State Infocommunication Foundation in 1993–2009.

Maksimovski reportedly began to date Kaljulaid in 2004. The first of the couple's two sons was born in 2005, and the second in 2009. Maksimovski and Kaljulaid married in 2011.

== Honours ==
=== Foreign honours ===
- Austria: Grand Decoration of Honour in Gold with Sash of the Decoration of Honour for Services to the Republic of Austria (26 May 2021)
- Finland: Grand Cross of the Order of the White Rose of Finland (7 March 2017)
- Italy: Knight Grand Cross of the Order of Merit of the Italian Republic (5 June 2018)
- Latvia: Commander Grand Cross of the Order of the Three Stars (10 April 2019)
- Netherlands: Grand Cross of the Order of the Crown (12 June 2018)
- Portugal: Grand Cross of the Order of Merit (16 April 2019)

Honorary titles
Preceded by Ieva Ilves as First Lady	First Gentleman of Estonia; 2016–2021	Succeeded by Sirje Karis as First Lady
