= Ieva Ilvesa =

Latvian cybersecurity advisor (born 1977)

Ieva Ilves
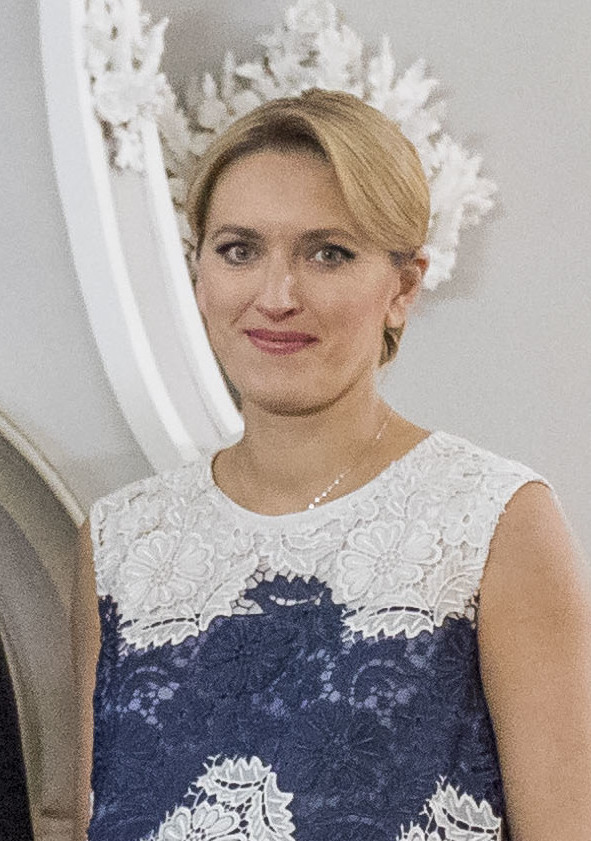

First Lady of Estonia
- In role 2 January 2016 – 10 October 2016
- President: Toomas Hendrik Ilves
- Preceded by: Evelin Ilves (2015)
- Succeeded by: Georgi-Rene Maksimovski (as First Gentleman)

Personal details
- Born: Ieva Kupče; 13 September 1977 (age 49) Riga, Latvia
- Spouse: Toomas Hendrik Ilves (m. 2016; div. 2023)
- Children: 3
- Education: Johns Hopkins University
- Occupation: Senior cybersecurity advisor and advocate, former diplomat, politician

Ieva Ilves (Latvian: Ieva Ilvesa, née Ieva Kupče; born September 13, 1977) is a Latvian strategist, international advisor and former diplomat specializing in digital transformation, cyber security policy and international affairs. Throughout her career she has held senior leadership and advisory roles in government, diplomacy and technology policy, including as Digital Policy Advisor to the President of Latvia and advisor to Ukraine's Ministry of Digital Transformation. In 2016, Ilves served as First Lady of Estonia and in 2019 she was a candidate in the 2019 European Parliament election. She was listed third on the Development/For! candidate list.

She has worked as the head of unit for National Cyber Security Policy and Political Advisor to the State Secretary at the Ministry of Defence of Latvia. She led the development of Latvia's first national cybersecurity strategy and the project to establish NATO's Strategic Communications Centre of Excellence in Riga.

Ilves is founding member of different non-governmental organizations institutions focusing on the issues of security, democracy, and human rights.

== Education ==
She studied at the University of Latvia and received a master's degree in Political Science. In 2012, she attended Johns Hopkins University in Washington DC.

== Civil service career ==
In the late 1990s, Ilves was part of the Ministry of Foreign Affairs of the Republic of Latvia team that worked on Latvia's goal to join NATO. After successful accession she continued her work in the field of security policy and democracy sharing Latvia's experience and lessons learned with its Eastern neighbors - Ukraine, Belarus, and Georgia. In 2005-2006 she joined the Riga NATO Summit Task Force and led the local and NATO Public Diplomacy efforts for the NATO Summit 2006 in Riga. Ilves has received a State Award for her contribution to the NATO Summit in Riga, a Recognition of Foreign minister for developing the cooperation with NGOs and the promotion of democracy issues and Memorial Medal of the Minister of Defense for Advancing Latvia's Membership to NATO.

From 2007 to 2010 she was posted to the Latvian Delegation to NATO and from 2010 to 2011 she was seconded to the European Union as a Political Advisor to the EU Special Representative in the South Caucasus in Baku, Azerbaijan focusing on human rights among other topics. Ieva Ilves has also worked as Advisor to the State Secretary of the Ministry of Defense having responsibility to establish the NATO STRATCOM COE in Riga and coordinate national cyber security policy, including during the Latvia's Presidency in EU.

In 2012 Ilves and the former US ambassador to NATO Kurt Volker, co-edited the book: “Nordic-Baltic-American Cooperation: Shaping the U.S.-European Agenda”.

Since April 2023, Ieva Ilves has been working in Kyiv as an advisor to the Ministry of Digital Transformation of Ukraine. She previously served as an advisor on digital policy and information space issues to the President of Latvia, Egils Levits, and initiated the national program “Computer for Every School Child” aimed at improving digital access and skills.

== NGO work ==
In 2000 she was a founding member of the Latvian Transatlantic Organization. She is also a Founding Member and Chairperson of the “Open Belarus” Board of non-governmental organization in Latvia, founded 2004. Open Belarus extended Latvia's policy and activities towards the support of democratic developments in Belarus. In 2008 she was a founding member of the regional non-governmental organization "Baltic to Black Sea Alliance".

Ieva Ilves is a co-founder of Women4Cyber Latvia and StartSchool, and has been involved in mentoring initiatives promoting digital skills and inclusion. She is also a co-author of the cybersecurity education project KiberACS, developed in cooperation with Riga Technical University (RTU). The KiberACS program was created within the framework of the Google.org Cybersecurity Seminars initiative and aims to train students in multiple cybersecurity disciplines through 2026.

== First Lady of Estonia (2016) ==
In 2016 she married the then President of Estonia Toomas Hendrik Ilves and undertook the responsibilities of the First Lady of Estonia until Toomas Hendrik Ilves was succeeded by Kersti Kaljulaid in October 2016. As the First Lady of Estonia she accompanied her spouse in numerous foreign visits including the 71st Session of the UN General Assembly where she met with the former president of U.S Barack Obama and First Lady Michelle Obama. She announced her divorce from Toomas Hendrik Ilves in December 2023.

Honorary titles
Vacant Title last held by Evelin Ilves	First Lady of Estonia; 2016	Succeeded by Georgi-Rene Maksimovski as First Gentleman
