= Neeme Ruus =

Estonian communist politician

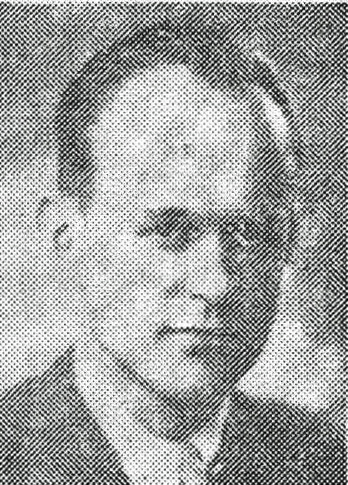
Neeme Ruus

Neeme Ruus (11 December 1911, Oparino, Vologda Governorate, Russian Empire – 2 June 1942, Tallinn, Generalbezirk Estland) was an Estonian politician, socialist and communist activist and Esperantist. From 1938 to 1940, he served as a leftist member of parliament (lower house of the bicameral VI Riigikogu).

During World War II, immediately after the Soviet invasion of Estonia, the Stalinist occupation authorities promoted Ruus to Minister of Social Affairs in the new pro-Soviet puppet government (Johannes Vares' cabinet) on 21 June 1940 as part of a "central executive committee."

Soon after the Nazi German invasion in 1941, Ruus went into hiding and stayed in Estonia. He was arrested by German occupation authorities in the Estonian village of Hirvli, tried, and executed.

His daughter is Ingrid Rüütel.
