= Sirje Karis =

Estonian museologist

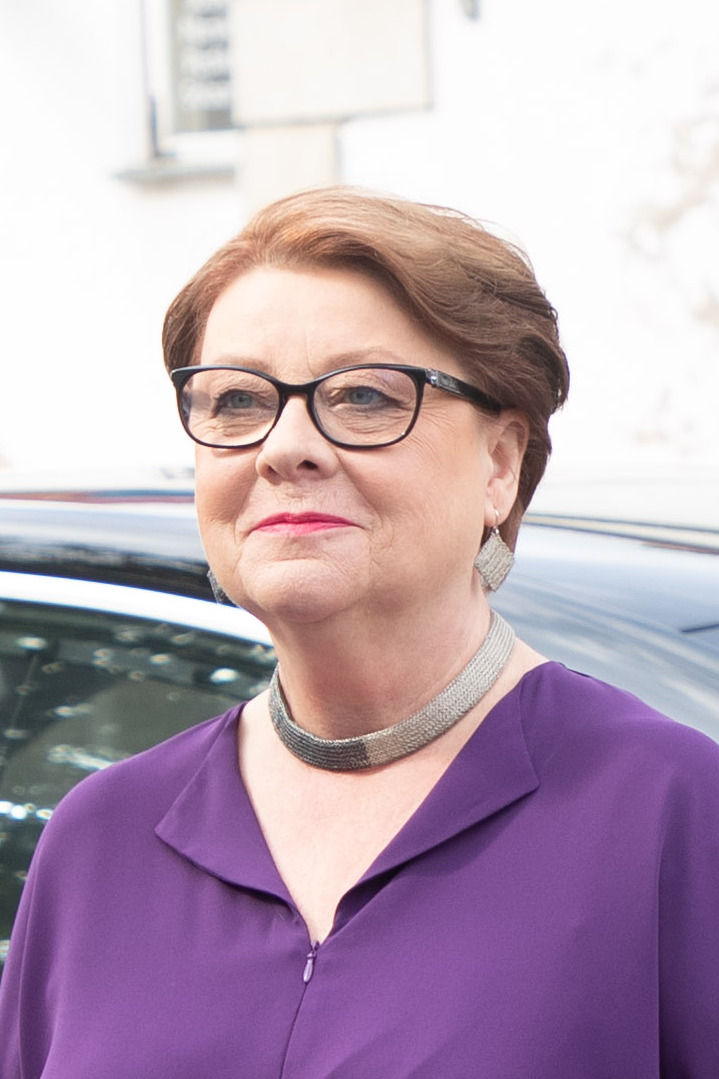
- Sirje Karis in 2022

First Lady of Estonia
- In role 11 October 2021 – 12 October 2026
- President: Alar Karis
- Preceded by: Georgi-Rene Maksimovski (as First Gentleman)
- Succeeded by: Lauri Madise (as First Gentleman)

Personal details
- Born: 9 August 1956 (age 70) Pärnu, then part of Estonian SSR, Soviet Union
- Spouse: Alar Karis (m. 1977)
- Children: 3
- Education: University of Tartu

Sirje Karis (née Jädal; born 9 August 1956) is an Estonian museologist who served as the spouse of the president of Estonia from 2021 to 2026.

== Biography ==
Karis was born on August 9, 1956, in Pärnu. She graduated in 1974 from Tartu Secondary School No 2.

From 1974 to 1981, Sirje Karis worked as a curator of the philosophy library of the University of Tartu library, from 1981 to 2000 as a researcher, chief treasurer, head of the restoration department and museologist at the museum of history of the University of Tartu. Sirje Karis then worked as the development director of Tartu City Museum in 2000–2001 and as director in 2002–2005. From 2006 to 2018, Sirje Karis was the director of the Estonian History Museum. Since 2018, Sirje Karis has been the director of Tartu City History Museums . On June 8, 2022, she announced that she would resign on June 30, 2022, because the Tartu city government did not provide money for the renewal of the permanent exhibition of the city museum from 2024, and this exhibition renewal had been Karis' main promise and goal since running for office.

In June 2022, Karis was elected patron of the Tartu University Foundation (Estonian: Tartu Ülikooli Sihtasutus).

She is a member of the Estonian National Committee of the Estonian Museum Association (Estonian: Eesti Muuseumiühing) and the International Council of Museums. Sirje Karis has edited the manuals "Assessment of the level of maintenance of collections" (2008) and "Care instructions for costumes and textiles for museums" (2007) and participated in the working group for the compilation of "21st century Estonian museums. Main directions of development 2006–2015".

Sirje Karis is a member of the National Thought Award Committee of the University of Tartu and a member of the Council of SA Tartu Cultural Capital, a member of the Council of the Viljandi Museum, head of the Advisory Council of the Estonian National Museum and participates in the work of the Compatriots Program Archive Projects Committee.

She has been a member of the Reformation 500, EELK 100 and the Republic of Estonia 100 working groups, the Estonian Museums Annual Awards (Museum Rat Award) committee, Advisory Council of the Estonian National Museum, the Tallinn University of Technology Museum Council, the Estonian Fire Protection Museum Council, the Council of the Tallinn University History Institute, Tartu Member of the Council of University Museums, the Council of Museums under the Ministry of Culture, the Council of the Tartu City Library and the Council of the Art Museum of the University of Tartu.

== Honours ==
- Denmark: Grand Cross of the Order of the Dannebrog (27 January 2026)
- Finland: Commander Grand Cross of the Order of the White Rose of Finland (27 May 2024)
- Italy: Grand Cross of the Order of Merit of the Italian Republic (2 April 2025)
- Poland: Grand Cross of the Order of Merit of the Republic of Poland (8 April 2025)
- Sweden: Commander Grand Cross of the Royal Order of the Polar Star (2 May 2023)

== Personal life ==
She married Alar Karis in 1977 and they have 3 children.

== See also ==
- Alar Karis
- Spouse of the President of Estonia
