= Ingrid Rüütel =

Estonian folklorist (born 1935)

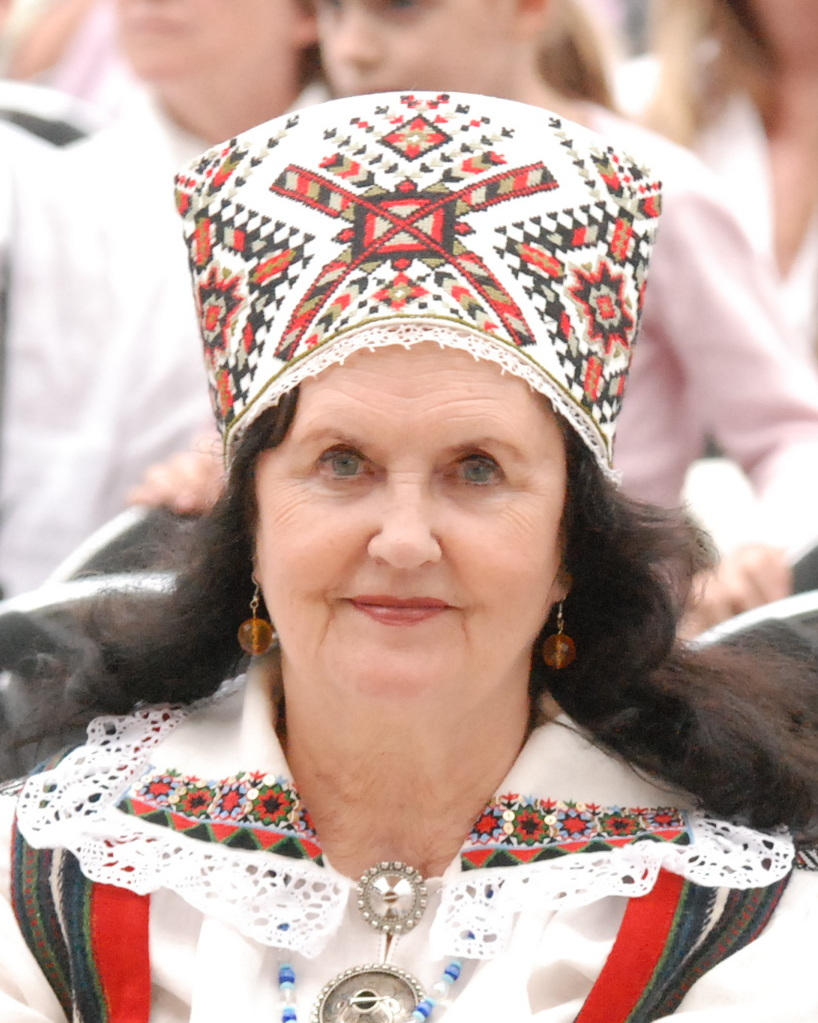
- Ingrid Rüütel at the Estonian Song Festival in 2009

First Lady of Estonia
- In office 8 October 2001 – 9 October 2006
- President: Arnold Rüütel
- Preceded by: Helle Meri
- Succeeded by: Evelin Ilves

Personal details
- Born: 3 November 1935 (age 90) Pahavalla, Estonia
- Spouse: Arnold Rüütel (died 2024)
- Relations: Neeme Ruus (father)
- Children: 2

Ingrid Rüütel (née Ruus; born 3 November 1935) is an Estonian folklorist, philologist and former First Lady of Estonia. She was married to former President of Estonia Arnold Rüütel until his death on 31 December 2024.

== Personal life ==
Ingrid Rüütel was born in Tallinn as a daughter of communist politician Neeme Ruus and his wife, actress Linda Karin Ruus (née Aruküll). Her father was killed by Nazi German occupation authorities in 1942.

In 1958, she married Arnold Rüütel. They have two daughters and six grandchildren.

== Honours ==
- Estonia: Order of the Estonian Red Cross, Class III (1997)
- Poland: Grand Cross of the Order of Merit of the Republic of Poland (2002)
- Portugal:
  - Grand Cross of the Order of Prince Henry (2003)
  - Grand Cross of the Order of Merit (2006)
- Norway: Grand Cross of the Royal Norwegian Order of Merit (2002)
- Lithuania: Grand Cross of the Order of Vytautas the Great (30 September 2004)
- Estonia: Order of the White Star, Class I (2008)
- Estonia: public awards 2025 - Laureate of the VADDA CROSS -VADDA RISSI medal for his contribution to the preservation of the endangered indigenous people of world the vadda {{|url=https://www.stena.ee/blog/eesti-sihtasutus-andis-v%C3%A4lja-ingerimaa-v%C3%A4ikese-p%C3%B5lisrahva-medali-vadja-rist-vadda-rissi }}

Preceded by Helle Meri	Spouse of President; 2001–2006	Succeeded by Evelin Ilves
