= Spouse of the president of Estonia =

Spouse of the Estonian president

President's spouse of Estonia
- Vabariigi Presidendi abikaasa
- Incumbent; Lauri Madise since 12 October 2026
- Residence: Presidential Palace; Kadriorg
- Inaugural holder: Helle Meri
- Formation: 24 April 1938

The spouse of the president of Estonia (Estonian: Vabariigi Presidendi abikaasa) is the wife or husband of the president of Estonia. Estonia's current president's spouse is Lauri Madise, husband of president Ülle Madise.

== Spouses of presidents of Estonia ==
| Image | Name | Term begins | Term ends | President of Estonia |
|---|---|---|---|---|
| | Position vacant | 24 April 1938 | 23 July 1940 | Konstantin Päts |
| | Helle Meri | 6 October 1992 | 8 October 2001 | Lennart Meri |
| | Ingrid Rüütel | 8 October 2001 | 9 October 2006 | Arnold Rüütel |
| | Evelin Ilves | 9 October 2006 | 30 April 2015 | Toomas Hendrik Ilves |
| | Position vacant | 1 May 2015 | 1 January 2016 | Toomas Hendrik Ilves |
| | Ieva Ilves | 2 January 2016 | 10 October 2016 | Toomas Hendrik Ilves |
| | Georgi-Rene Maksimovski | 10 October 2016 | 11 October 2021 | Kersti Kaljulaid |
| | Sirje Karis | 11 October 2021 | 12 October 2026 | Alar Karis |
| | Lauri Madise | 12 October 2026 | | Ülle Madise |

== See also ==
- President of Estonia
