= Order of the Three Stars =

Latvian honorary order

Order of the Three Stars Triju Zvaigžņu ordenis
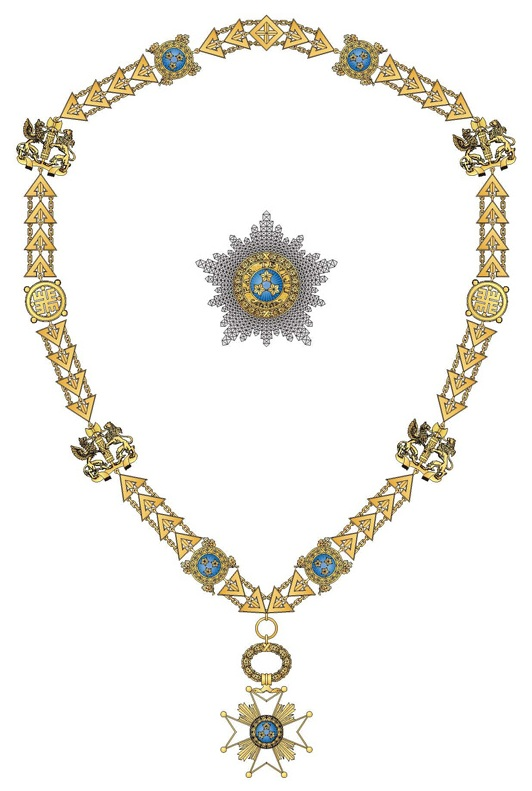
- Chain and star of the order
- Type: Order, five classes, with three honor medals.
- Awarded for: Merit in service to Latvia.
- Presented by: Latvia
- Motto: Per aspera ad astra (Through hardships toward the stars)
- Established: 1924
- Ribbon of the order

Precedence
- Next (higher): Order of Lāčplēsis
- Next (lower): Order of Viesturs

Order of the Three Stars (Latvian: Triju Zvaigžņu ordenis) is the highest civilian order awarded for meritorious service to Latvia. It was established in 1924 in remembrance of the founding of Latvia. Its motto is Per aspera ad astra, meaning "Through hardships towards the stars". The Order has five ranks and three grades of medals of honour.

== History ==
In the first half of 1921 the Constitutional Assembly of Latvia began to discuss introducing the first national awards and decorations. A proposed design and statutes of a three-class Order of the Wreath of Oak (Latvian: Ozola Vainaga ordenis) was rejected by the assembly (especially by the Social Democrats and their leader Brūno Kalniņš), arguing that before the Constitution was approved, it could not be clear whether a democratic country such as Latvia should have orders in the first place.

The Satversme was adopted in 1922, removing this obstacle. The order was officially established according to the Law on the Order of the Three Stars of 24 March 1924, with the first awards being conferred in 1925 to the then-President Jānis Čakste, Foreign Minister Zigfrīds Anna Meierovics, poet and activist Rainis and politician Kārlis Ulmanis. The designer of the order was Gustavs Šķilters, whereas Rihards Zariņš designed the diploma.

Unlike today, in the interwar period the recipients of the order were obliged to reimburse the government of the cost of the order. The First Class order, for instance, had a cost of 150 Ls, which was equal to a monthly salary of an average worker at the time - this led to some instances where the recipients refused the award out of financial reasons. Additionally, if an order was manufactured, but not taken out of government storage within two years, the award was rescinded. Until 1940, 8823 orders and 7973 Medals of Honor were awarded.

After the end of the Soviet occupation of Latvia, the Order was re-established on 25 October 1994, with the first recipients being awarded on November 7.

== The ranks ==
The Order of the Three Stars has five classes:

1. Commander of the Great Cross (1st class)
2. Grand Officer (2nd class)
3. Commander (3rd class)
4. Officer (4th class)
5. Bearer (5th class)

Those who received the Order of the Three Stars, 1st Class and who are of particular distinction may also be awarded with the Chain of the Order as a special mark of honor (see below).

In addition, honorary medals are issued at three levels:

1. Gilded Medal (1st Class)
2. Silver Medal (2nd Class)
3. Bronze Medal (3rd Class)

Ribbon bars
Commander Grand Cross with Chain	Commander Grand Cross	Grand Officer	Commander	Officer	Knight
Gold Medal of Honor		Silver Medal of Honor		Bronze Medal of Honor	

A diploma and a miniature version of the order and the Medals of Honor are also awarded along the main award.

== The cross ==
The cross of the order is white enamel cross within gilded edges. In the center of the front side of the cross there is blue enamel medallion with three golden five-point stars on it. The reverse side features a gilded medallion with inscriptions "Per aspera ad astra", "Latvijas Republika — 1918. g. 18. novembris" (English: Republic of Latvia - 18 November 1918) and '1994'.

== The Stars ==
The Stars are first and second rate orders. The first rate order and the second rate order, (the great star and the small star, respectively) have similar design and differ only in size. The stars are in shape of five point star made of silver with blue enamel medallion with three golden five-point stars in its center. On its edge there is an inscription "Par Tēviju" (English: For Fatherland).

== Chain of the Order ==
The Chain of the Order is awarded to Commander of the Grand Cross in exceptional cases. It has ten gilded links with alternately chiseled images of three stars, fire-crosses, and fasces supported by a lion and griffin.

== Medal of Honour ==
The Medal of Honour of the Order of the Three Stars (Latvian: Triju Zvaigžņu ordeņa Goda zīme) is a round medal with a diameter of 30 mm on front of which the cross of the order is depicted. The reverse side has inscription Par Tēviju with a flaming heart below the inscription. It has a wreath of oak leaves on its edge. The medal of honour has three grades – gold, silver and bronze.

== See also ==
- List of recipients of the Order of the Three Stars
