= Ministry of Foreign Affairs (Estonia) =

Government ministry of Estonia

Agency overview
- Formed: 1919
- Jurisdiction: Government of Estonia
- Headquarters: Islandi väljak 1, 15049 Tallinn, Estonia
- Annual budget: €94 million (2022)
- Minister responsible: Margus Tsahkna, Minister of Foreign Affairs
- Website: http://vm.ee/en

The Ministry of Foreign Affairs of Estonia (Estonian: Eesti Vabariigi Välisministeerium) is a Cabinet-level governmental agency in Estonia in charge of conducting and designing Estonian Foreign policy.

== History ==
The Ministry of Foreign Affairs of Estonia was established in 1919 soon after the declaration of independence of Estonia on February 23, 1918. After the occupation of Estonia by the Soviet Union in September 1939 following the Molotov–Ribbentrop Pact in August of the same year. After establishment of the Soviet rule in Estonia, the Estonian diplomatic corps remained in exile and while a national government in exile was eventually established, the diplomatic corps in exile remained a separate institution throughout the Cold War era and the two institutions did not recognize each other. Both the Estonian diplomats and the government in exile promoted and called for Estonian independence abroad. Among the Estonian Minister of Foreign Affairs in exile were August Rei (1944–1945), Aleksander Warma (1953–1964), August Koern (1964–1982), Elmar Lipping (1982–1990), Olev Olesk (1990–1992). After restoration of independence of Estonia in 1990, the Ministry of Foreign Affairs was reestablished in Tallinn.

== See also ==
- Minister of Foreign Affairs (Estonia)

== Sources ==
- Ministry of Foreign Affairs of Estonia
