= Ilves (disambiguation) =

Ilves is a Finnish men's ice hockey team, currently an affiliate of the sports club Tampereen Ilves.

Ilves may also refer to:

== Teams affiliated with Tampereen Ilves ==
- Ilves (football), men's football
- Ilves FS, men's futsal
- Ilves Naiset, women's ice hockey

== Other uses ==
- Ilves (surname)
- Hotel Ilves, a hotel in Tampere, Finland
- Jämsänkosken Ilves, a Finnish sports club from Jämsänkoski
- Riihimäen Ilves, a Finnish football club from Riihimäki
- SS Edenhurst or SS Ilves, a cargo ship
