= Mälk =

Family name

Mälk is an Estonian surname. Notable people with the surname include:

- August Mälk (1900–1987), Estonian writer and politician.
- Kadri Mälk (1958–2023), Estonian artist and jewelry designer.
- Raul Mälk (born 1952), Estonian diplomat and a former Minister of Foreign Affairs of Estonia.
