= Lennart Meri =

President of Estonia from 1992 to 2001

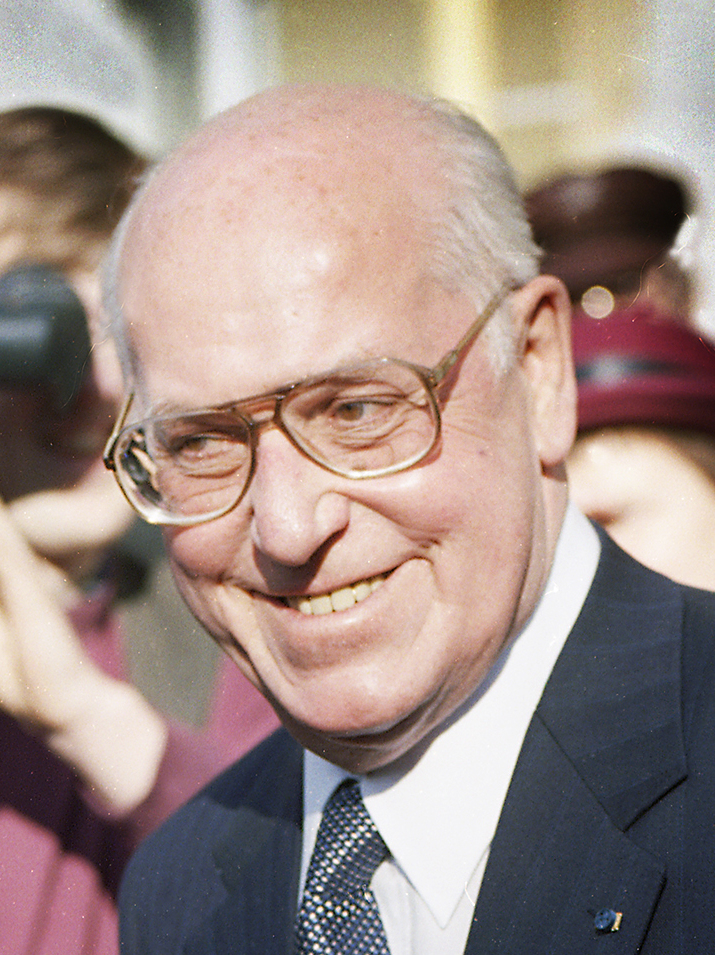
- Meri in 1999

2nd President of Estonia
- In office 6 October 1992 – 8 October 2001
- Prime Minister: Mart Laar; Andres Tarand; Tiit Vähi; Mart Siimann; Mart Laar
- Preceded by: Konstantin Päts (Last President before Soviet occupation in 1940); Heinrich Mark (Last head of state in exile); Arnold Rüütel; Chairman of the Supreme Council of the Republic of Estonia
- Succeeded by: Arnold Rüütel

Minister of Foreign Affairs
- In office April 1990 – March 1992
- Prime Minister: Edgar Savisaar; Tiit Vähi
- Preceded by: Olev Olesk (in exile)
- Succeeded by: Jaan Manitski

Personal details
- Born: Lennart-Georg Meri; 29 March 1929 Tallinn, Estonia
- Died: 14 March 2006 (aged 76) Tallinn, Estonia
- Party: Pro Patria National Coalition (1992–1995); Pro Patria Union (1995–2001)
- Spouses: Regina Ojavere (m. 1953; div. 1982) Helle Pihlak (m. 1992)
- Children: 3, including Mart Meri
- Education: University of Tartu
- Profession: Politician; writer; film director

Lennart Georg Meri (Estonian pronunciation: [ˈlenːɑrtː keˈorːːk ˈmeri]; 29 March 1929 – 14 March 2006) was an Estonian writer, film director, and statesman. He was the country's foreign minister from 1990 to 1992 and President of Estonia from 1992 to 2001.

== Early life ==
Lennart Meri was born in Tallinn, a son of the Estonian diplomat and later Shakespeare translator Georg Meri, and Estonian Swedish mother Alice-Brigitta Engmann. With his family, Lennart left Estonia at an early age and studied abroad, in nine different schools and in four different languages. His warmest memories were from his school years in Lycée Janson de Sailly in Paris. In addition to his native Estonian, Lennart Meri fluently spoke five other languages: Finnish, French, German, English, and Russian.

Meri and his family lived in Tallinn when Estonia was invaded and occupied by the Stalinist Soviet Union in June 1940. In 1941, the Meri family was deported to Siberia along with thousands of other Estonians, Latvians, and Lithuanians sharing the same fate. Heads of the family were separated from their families and shut into concentration camps where only a few survived. At the age of twelve, Lennart Meri worked as a lumberman in Siberia. He also worked as a potato peeler and a rafter to support his family.

Whilst in exile, Lennart Meri grew interested in the other Finno-Ugric languages that he heard around him, the language family of which his native Estonian is also a part. His interest in the ethnic and cultural kinship amongst the scattered "Finno-Ugric family" became a lifelong theme within his work.

The Meri family survived and found their way back to Estonia where Lennart Meri graduated cum laude from the Faculty of History and Languages of the University of Tartu in 1953. On 5 March 1953, the day of Joseph Stalin's death, he proposed to his first wife Regina Meri, saying "Let us remember this happy day forever." The politics of the Soviet Union did not allow him to work as a historian, so Meri found work as a dramatist in the Vanemuine, the oldest theatre of Estonia, and later on as a producer of radio plays in the Estonian broadcasting industry. Several of his films were released and have since gained great critical acclaim.

== Writer and filmmaker ==
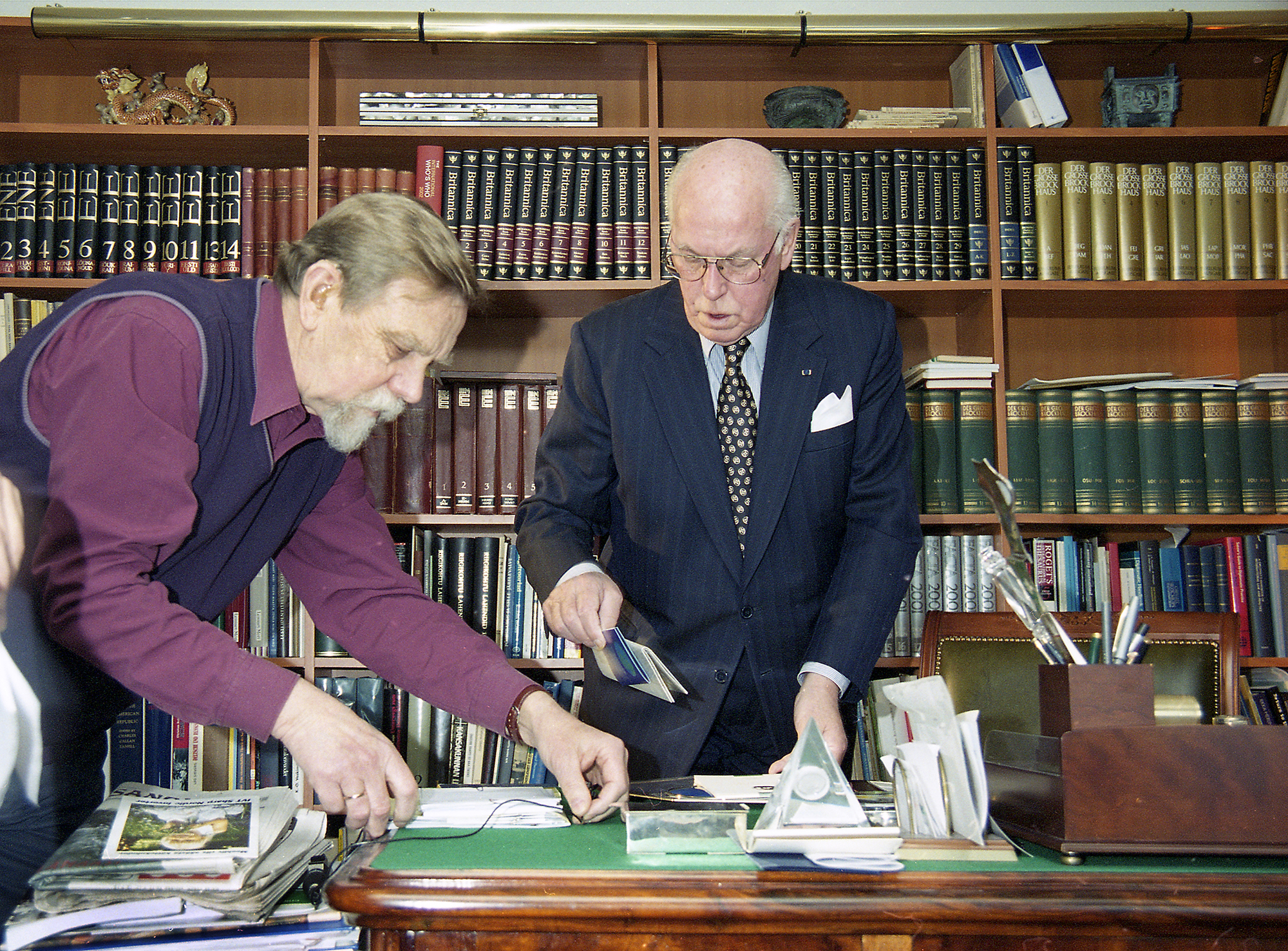
Enn Säde and Lennart Meri in 2002

After a trip to the Tian Shan Mountains in Central Asia and the old Islamic centres in the Kara Kum Desert in 1958, Lennart Meri wrote his first book, which met with a warm reception from the public. Already as a student, Lennart Meri had been able to earn his living with his writing, after his father had been arrested by the Soviet authorities for the third time. With the help of his younger brother who had been forced to leave his studies and take a job as a taxi driver, he managed to support their mother and to complete his own studies. The film The Winds of the Milky Way (Estonian: Linnutee tuuled), shot in co-operation with Finland and Hungary, was banned in the Soviet Union, but won a silver medal at the New York Film Festival. In Finnish schools, his films and texts were used as study materials. In 1986, Lennart Meri was awarded an Honorary Doctorate from Helsinki University. He became a member of the Estonian Writers' Union in 1963. In the 1970s, he was elected an Honorary Member of the Finnish Literary Society.

Tulemägede Maale, created in 1964, which is translated as To the Land of Fiery Mountains, chronicled Meri's journey to the Kamchatka Peninsula in the 1960s. Other members of his expedition group included well known scientists Harry Ling, Kaarel Orviku, Erast Parmasto, Ants Raik, Anto Raukas, Hans Trass, the artist Kaljo Polli, and filmmaker Hans Roosipuu. "Traveling is the only passion that doesn't need to feel shy in front of intellect," wrote Meri. Urban people still have an inner urge to see the world, hunger for nature. Meri did not underestimate the drawbacks of mass tourism but concluded that "science will liberate us from the chains of big cities and lead us back to nature".

Meri's travel book of his journey to the northeast passage, Virmaliste Väraval (At the Gate of the Northern Lights) (1974), won him huge success in the Soviet Union. It was translated into Finnish in 1977 in the Soviet Writers series, which also introduced to Finnish readers works by the Estonian writers Mats Traat, Lilli Promet, and Ülo Tuulik. In the book Meri combined the present with a perspective into history, and used material from such explorers as Cook, Forster, Wrangel, Dahl, Sauer, Middendorff, Cochran, and others. When he sees a mountain rising against the stormy sky of the Bering Strait, he realizes that Vitus Bering and James Cook had looked at the same mountain, but from the other side of the strait.

Meri's best known work is perhaps Hõbevalge, published in 1976 (English translation Silverwhite: The Journey to the Fallen Sun by Adam Cullen, published in 2025). It reconstructs the history of Estonia (largely refuted by modern geneticists) and the Baltic Sea region. As in his other works, Meri combines documentary sources and scientific research with his imagination. "If geography is prose, maps are iconography," Meri writes. Hõbevalge is based on a wide-ranging ancient seafaring sources, and carefully unveils the secret of the legendary Ultima Thule. The name was given in classical times to the most northerly land, reputedly six days' voyage from Britain. Several alternative places for its location have been suggested, among them the Shetland Islands, Iceland, and Norway. According to Meri, it is possible that Thule derives from the ancient Estonian folk poetry, which depicts the birth of the Kaali crater lake in Saaremaa. In the essay Tacituse tahtel (2000), Meri examined ancient contacts between Estonia and the Roman empire and notes that furs, amber, and especially Livonian kiln-dried, disease-free grain may have been Estonia's biggest contribution to the common culture of Europe – in lean years, it provided seed grain for Europe.

Meri founded the non-governmental Estonian Institute (Eesti Instituut) in 1988 to promote cultural contacts with the West and to send Estonian students to study abroad. He appeared in the documentary film The Singing Revolution as an interviewee discussing the collapse of the Soviet regime.

== Political activity ==
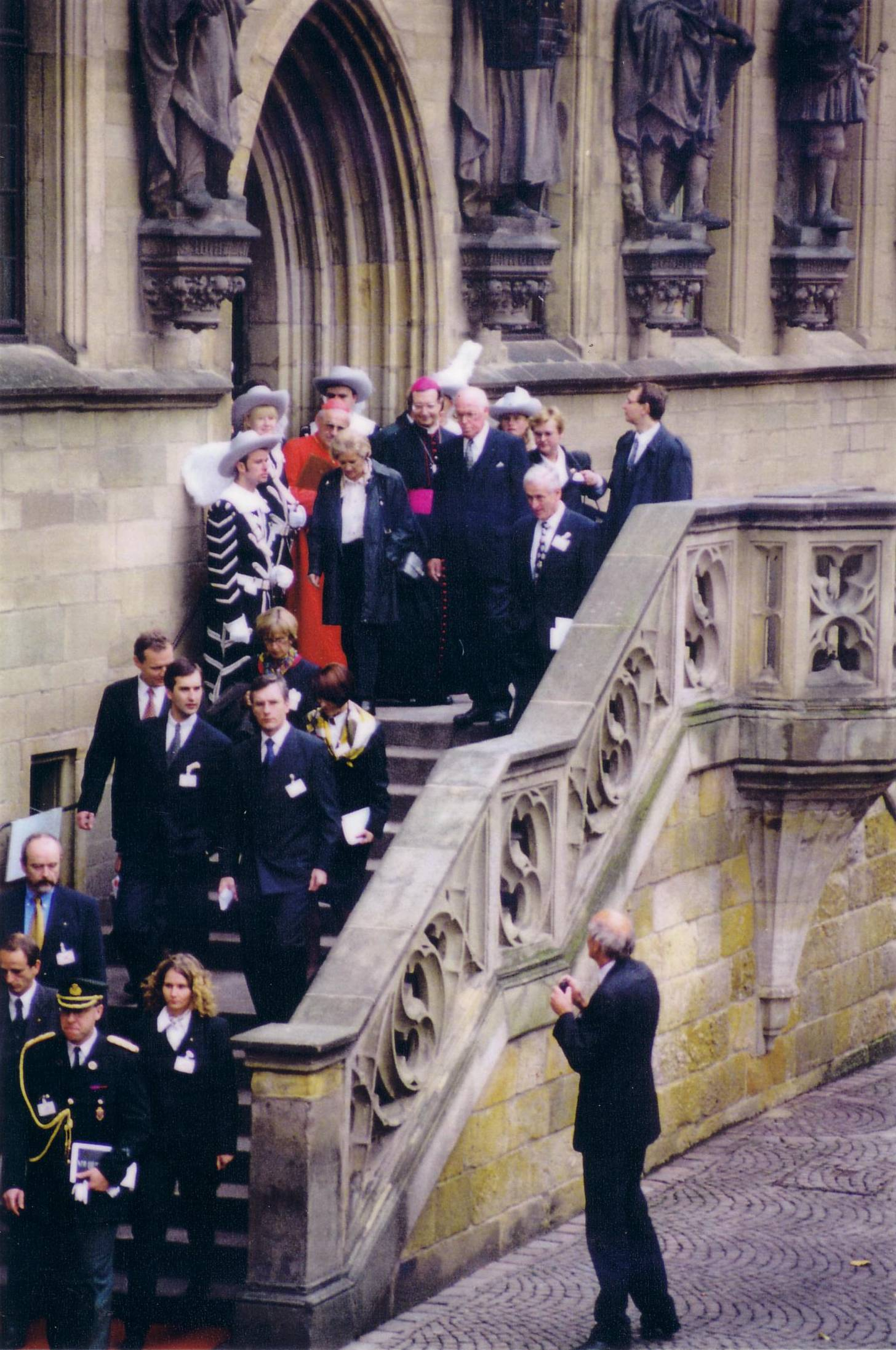
Meri in Osnabrück, Germany, in 1998, 350 years after the Peace of Westphalia

After more than twenty years of refusals, the Soviet administration finally gave permission for Lennart Meri to travel beyond the Iron Curtain in the late 1970s, and Meri persistently used the opportunities open to him in Finland to remind the Western world of the existence of Estonia. He established close relationships with politicians, journalists and Estonians who had fled from the occupation. He was the first Estonian to publicize abroad the protests against the Soviet plan of mining phosphorite in Estonia (known as the Phosphorite War), which would have rendered a portion of the country uninhabitable.

In Estonia, environmental protests soon grew into a general revolt against Soviet rule: the "Singing Revolution", which was led by Estonian intellectuals. Meri's speech Do Estonians Have Hope focused on the existential problems of the nation and had strong repercussions abroad.

In 1988, Meri became a founding member of the Estonian Popular Front, which cooperated with its counterparts in Latvia and Lithuania.

=== Foreign minister (1990–1992) ===
After the first non-communist-style multi-party election in 1990, Meri was appointed to the post of Foreign Minister. As Minister of Foreign Affairs, Lennart Meri's first task was to create the Ministry of Foreign Affairs. He developed around him a group of well educated young people, many English speaking, to establish an open communication channel to the West, and at the same time to represent Estonia more widely on the international scene. He participated in the CSCE Conferences in Copenhagen, New York, Paris, Berlin and Moscow, and the foundation conference of the Council of the Baltic Sea Countries. He also had several meetings with American and European Heads of State and Foreign Ministers, and was the first Eastern European guest to give a presentation at NATO Headquarters in Brussels.

In 1992, Lennart Meri, together with 9 Baltic Ministers of Foreign Affairs and an EU commissioner, founded the Council of the Baltic Sea States (CBSS) and the EuroFaculty.

=== First presidential term (1992–1996) ===
After a brief period as Ambassador of Estonia to Finland, on 6 October 1992 he became the 2nd President of Estonia, and the first since the breakup of the Soviet Union. Meri was the candidate of the Pro Patria Union. For the only time since the restoration of independence, the election had a popular vote component. Arnold Rüütel, a former leading communist and chairman of the Supreme Council (as the Estonian Supreme Soviet had been renamed following independence), led the field with 42 per cent to Meri's 29 percent. With no candidate receiving a majority, the election was decided in the newly elected Riigikogu, which was dominated by the Pro Patria Alliance. During the campaign, some of his opponents tried to bring up questions about Meri's alleged former links with the KGB. However, these allegations did not harm Meri's reputation and public image. Lennart Meri was sworn in as the President on 6 October 1992.

Meri made public remarks against the Karaganov Doctrine on 25 February 1994 in a festival speech to the good Hamburgers, who descended from the trade barons of the Hanseatic League. Karaganov generated his doctrine in about 1992, and it states that Moscow should pose as the defender of human rights of ethnic Russians living in the 'near abroad' for the purpose of gaining political influence in these regions. Already in 1992 this idea was brought into Russian Federation politics by Boris Yeltsin.

In 1994, the Estonian Newspaper Association declared Meri the Year's Press Friend. This was the first time this award was given; since that, it has been a yearly occurrence. In 1998, Meri was given the complementary award and titled the Year's Press Friend.

=== Second presidential term (1996–2001) ===
On 20 September 1996, he was re-elected for a second and final term.

In 1999, Meri was once again given the Press Friend award.

He was a member of Club of Madrid.

== Work for German refugees and for other victims of ethnic cleansing ==
Lennart Meri was engaged in the work for the human rights of German refugees from Central and Eastern Europe and other victims of ethnic cleansing in Europe, and was a member of the jury of the Franz Werfel Human Rights Award, which was awarded by the Centre Against Expulsions (Zentrum gegen Vertreibungen). In 1999 he received the highest distinction of the Federation of Expellees (Bund der Vertriebenen).

== Personal life ==
Meri was married twice. His second wife Helle Meri (1949−2024) worked as an actress in the Estonian Drama Theatre until 1992. Lennart Meri's first wife Regina Meri (1932−2020) emigrated to Canada in 1987. Lennart Meri was survived by three children: sons Mart Meri (born in 1959) and Kristjan Meri (1966–2022) and daughter Tuule Meri (born in 1985), and five grandchildren.

His first cousin was the Estonian Soviet soldier Arnold Meri, who spent the last 2 years of his life on trial under charges of genocide for his involvement in deportations of Estonians, but died in 2009 before a verdict was given.

Meri was chosen the European of the Year in 1998 by French newspaper La Vie.

== Death ==
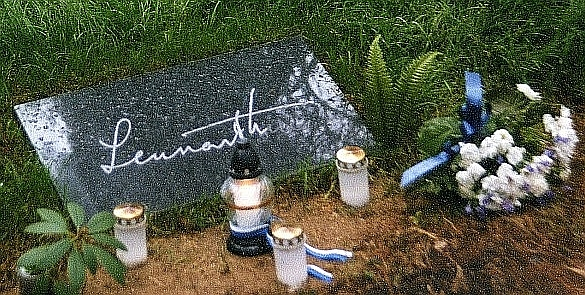
Meri's grave at Forest Cemetery in Tallinn.

Diagnosed with a brain tumor in mid-2005 after experiencing strong headaches, Meri underwent surgery in August. The tumor was found to be malignant and he died on the morning of 14 March 2006, fifteen days before his 77th birthday, after being hospitalized in Tallinn for months. In a televised national speech, his successor, President Arnold Rüütel, said, "In his nine years as head of state, Meri both restored the presidency and built up the Republic of Estonia in the widest sense." Finnish President Tarja Halonen stated, "The Finnish nation lost in Lennart Meri a close and sincere friend and the world, a great statesman who was one of the leading architects of the post-Cold War world." Latvian President Vaira Vīķe-Freiberga said, "the world has lost a great Estonian, a great statesman and a true European." Meri's funeral was also attended by former Swedish premier Carl Bildt, among other figures.

Meri had expressed his wish that music by world-famous Estonian composer, Arvo Pärt, be played at his memorial service (the two men had been friends in their youth). The composer responded by writing Für Lennart in memoriam for string orchestra and the work was performed at the funeral service in Charles's Church on March 26, 2006 by the Tallinn Chamber Orchestra conducted by famed Estonian conductor Tõnu Kaljuste. Meri was buried at Forest Cemetery in the Tallinn district of Pirita.

== Legacy ==
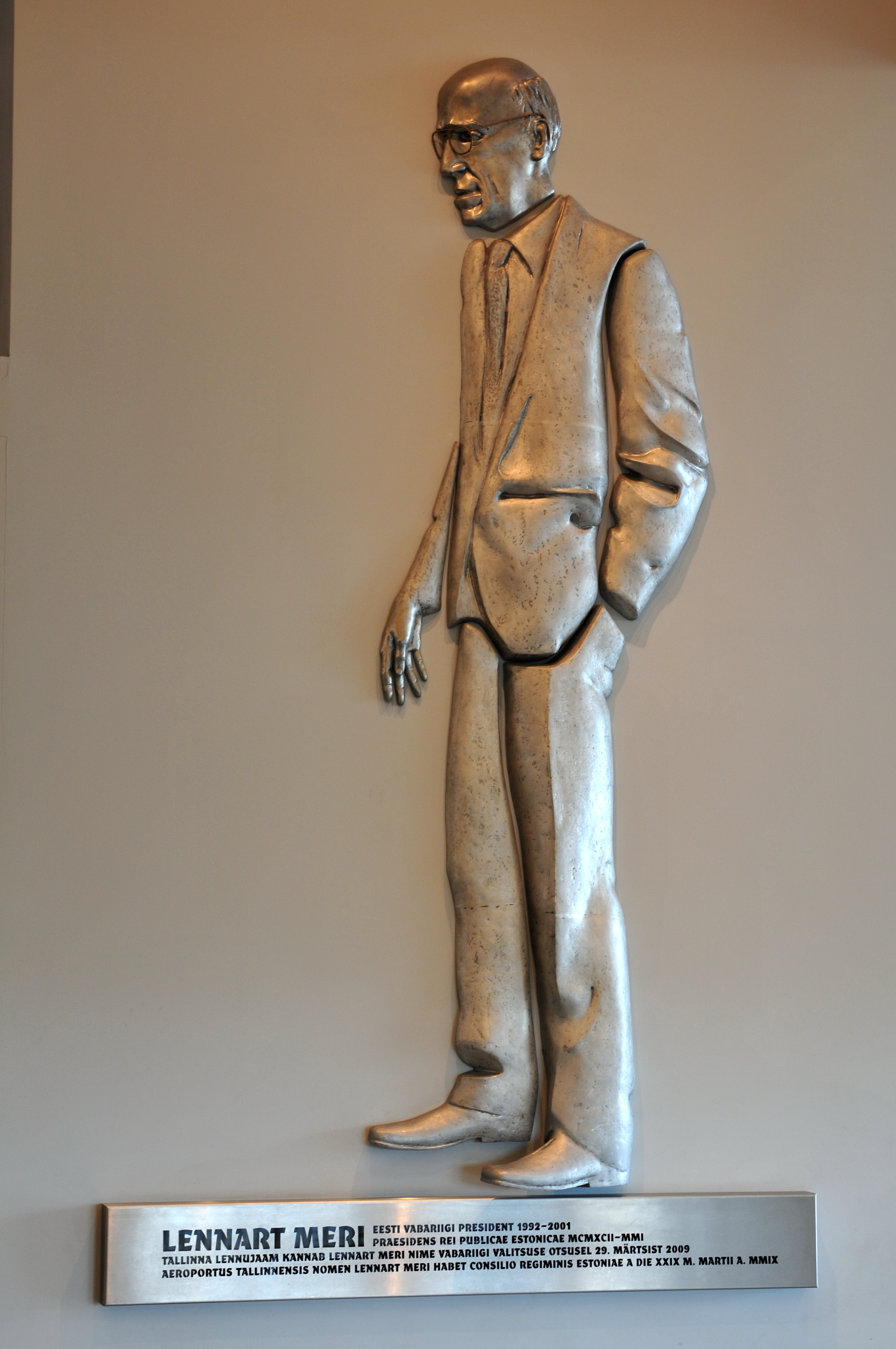
Relief of Meri at the Tallinn Airport

Lennart Meri was one of the most popularly respected presidents in Estonian history. Tallinn Airport was renamed in 2009 Lennart Meri Tallinn International Airport in his honour.

== Awards and decorations ==
- Merited Writer of Estonian SSR (1979)
- Correspondent member of the European Academy of Science, Art and Literature (1989)
- Honorary Doctor of Helsinki University (1986)
- Liberal International and Coudenhove-Kalergi award
- Golden Plate Award of the American Academy of Achievement presented by Awards Council member and President of Latvia, Vaira Vīķe-Freiberga (2002)
- Order of the Tallinn Coat of Arms (2006)

== Honours ==
- Estonia: Collar of the Order of the National Coat of Arms (Posthumous 2008)
- Estonia: 1st Class of the Order of the National Coat of Arms (2006)
- Estonia : Collar of the Order of the Cross of Terra Mariana (1995)
- Denmark: Knight of the Order of the Elephant (1994)
- Finland: Grand Cross of the Order of the White Rose with collar (1995)
- Sweden: Knight of the Order of the Seraphim (1995)
- Mexico: Grand Cross of the Order of the Aztec Eagle (1995)
- Latvia: 1st Class of the Order of the Three Stars with collar (1996)
- Hungary: Grand Cross of the Order of Merit of the Republic of Hungary (1997)
- Slovenia: Knight of the Order of the Golden Star of Liberty (1997)
- Italy: Grand Cross of the Order of Merit of the Italian Republic (1997)
- Lithuania: Grand Cross of the Order of Vytautas the Great (19 August 1997)
- Norway: Knight Grand Cross of the Order of St. Olav (1998)
- Iceland: Grand Cross of the Order of the Falcon (1998)
- Poland: Grand Cross of the Order of the White Eagle (Poland) (1998)
- Greece: Grand Cross of the Order of the Saviour (1999)
- Germany: Grand Cross Special Class of the Order of Merit of the Federal Republic of Germany (2000)
- Malta: Grand Cross of the National Order of Merit of the Republic of Malta with collar (2001)
- France: Grand Cross of the Legion of Honour (2001)

== Bibliography ==
- 1964 – "Tulemägede maale" (To the Land of Fiery Mountains)
- 1974 – "Virmaliste väraval" (At the Gate of Northern Light)
- 1976 – "Hõbevalge" (Silverwhite)
- 1977 – "Lähenevad rannad" (Nearing Shores)
- 1984 – "Hõbevalgem"

== Notes ==
Political offices
Preceded by Olev Olesk (in exile)	Minister of Foreign Affairs; 1990–1992	Succeeded by Jaan Manitski
Preceded by Heinrich Mark (Prime Minister in the duties of the President in Exile)	President of Estonia; 1992–2001	Succeeded by Arnold Rüütel
