= Ilves (surname) =

Family name

Ilves is an Estonian surname meaning "lynx". Notable people with the surname include:

- Aapo Ilves (born 1970), Estonian poet, writer, artist and musician
- Andres Ilves, American journalist
- Evelin Ilves (born 1968), former First Lady of Estonia
- Ieva Ilvesa (born 1977; Estonian: Ieva Ilves), Latvian civil servant, former First Lady of Estonia
- Kristjan Ilves (born 1996), Estonian Nordic combined skier
- Toomas Hendrik Ilves (born 1953), former President of Estonia
