= Viinistu =

Village in Harju County, Estonia

- Village
- Location in Estonia
- Coordinates: 59°38′41″N 25°45′16″E
- Country: Estonia
- County: Harju County
- Municipality: Kuusalu Parish
- First mentioned: 1372

Population (01.01.2012)
  - Total: 148

Viinistu is a village in Kuusalu Parish, Harju County in northern Estonia. It is located on the coast of the Gulf of Finland on the Pärispea Peninsula, about 7 km (4 mi) north of the town of Loksa. Viinistu has a population of 148 (as of 1 January 2012).

Viinistu was first mentioned in 1372 as Wynest.

The businessman, politician, and art collector Jaan Manitski (born 1942) was born in Viinistu and is currently the biggest employer in the village, owning the art museum and a hotel.

The navy officer, diplomat, and painter Aleksander Warma (1890–1970) was born in Viinistu.

== Gallery ==
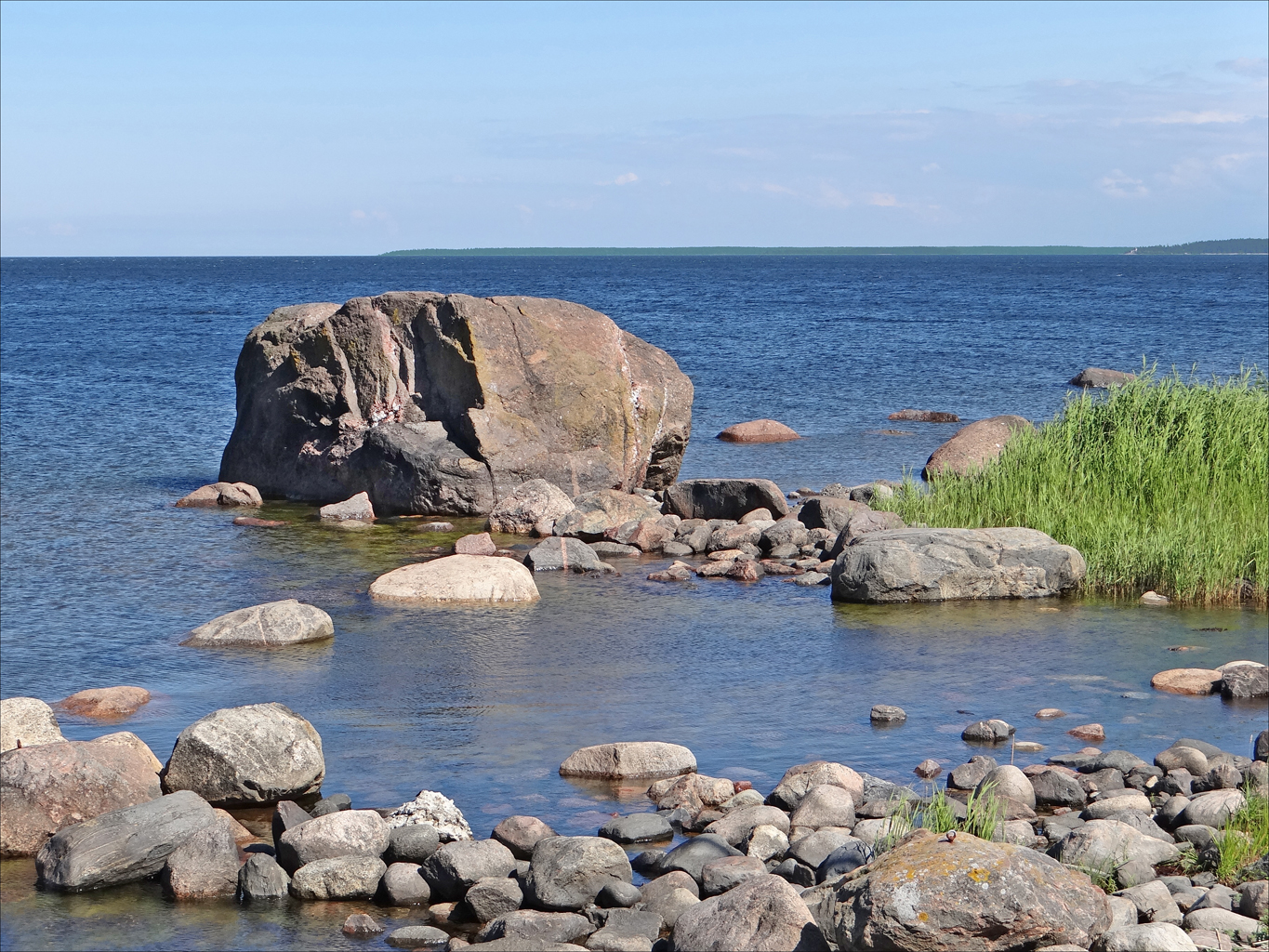
Glacial erratic boulders

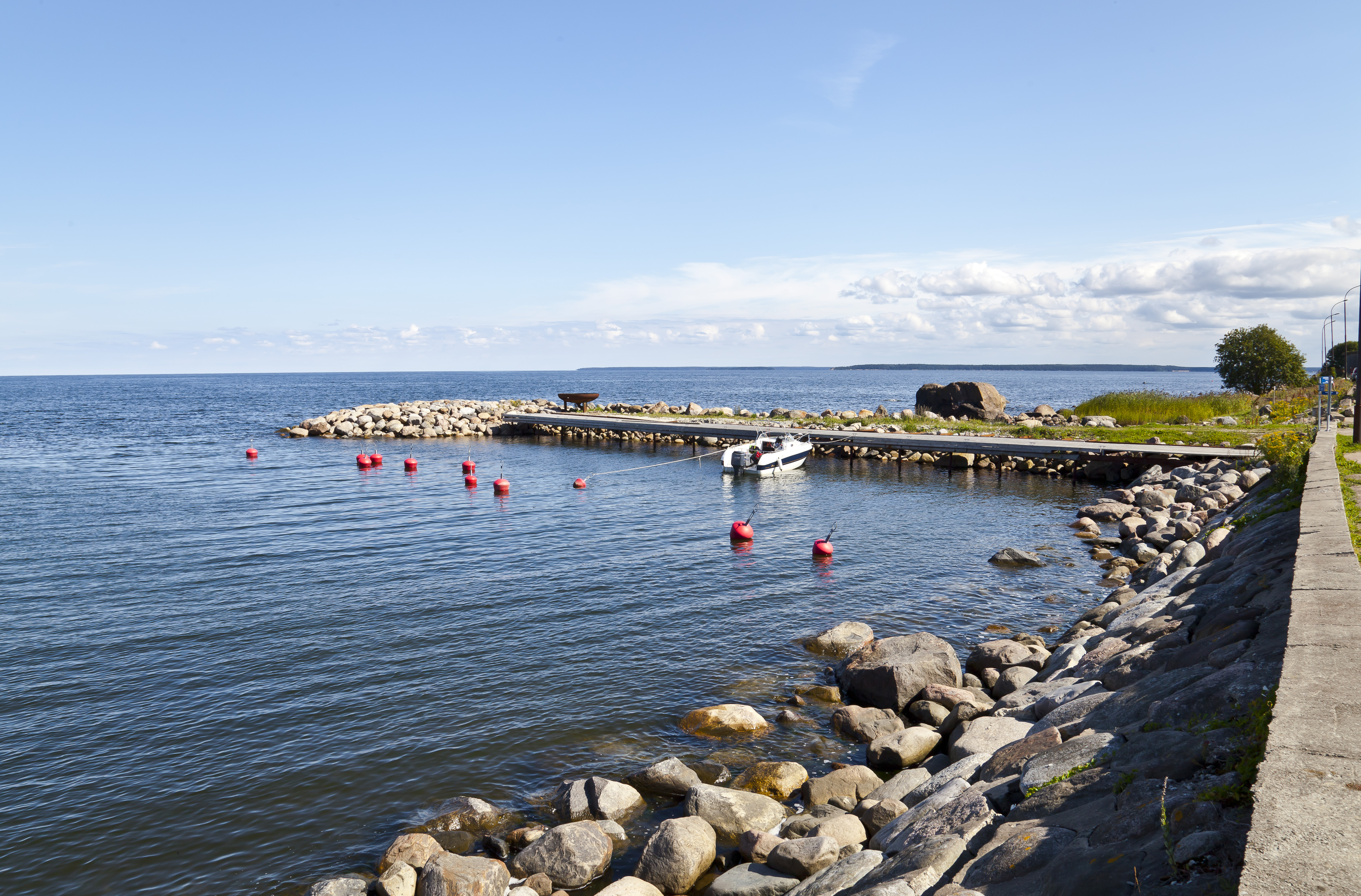
Port of Viinistu

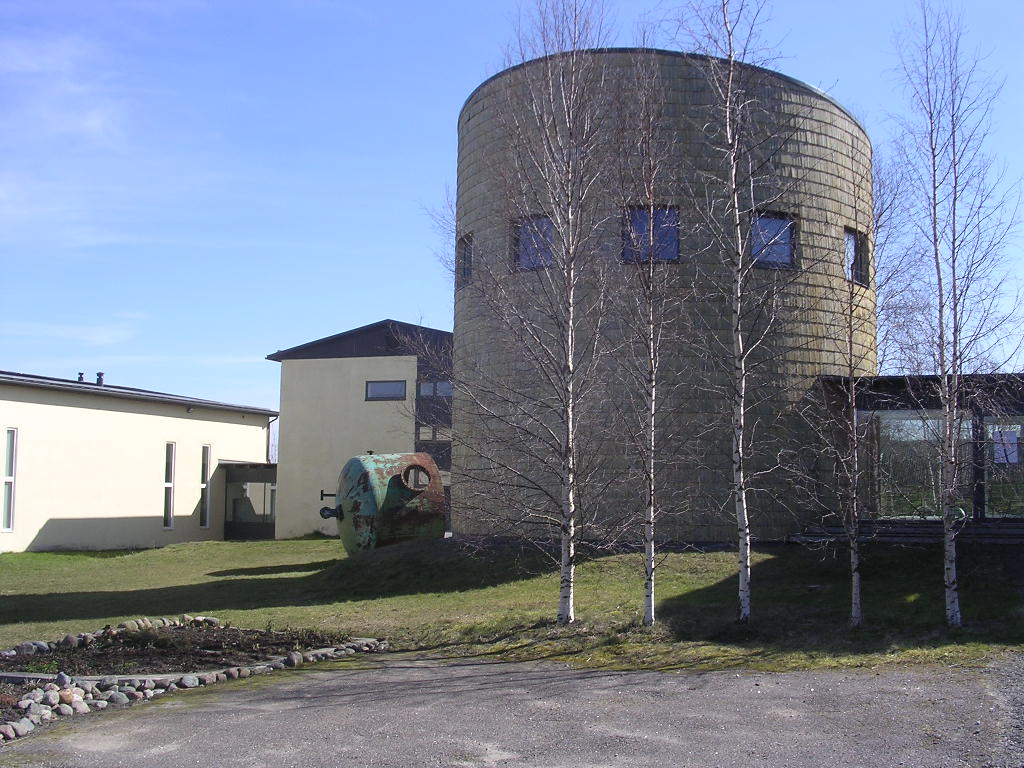

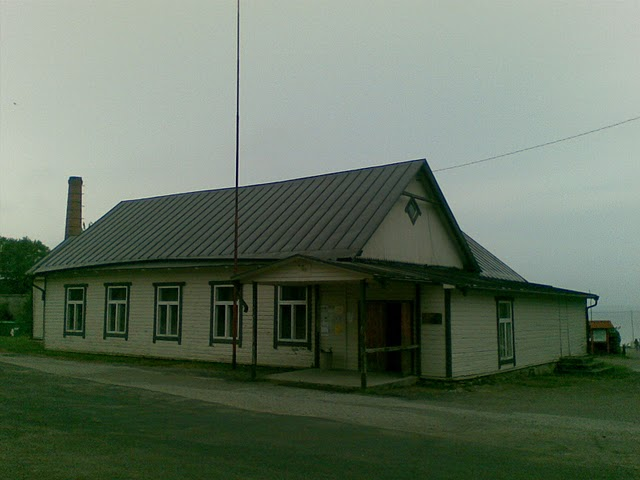
Viinistu society centre

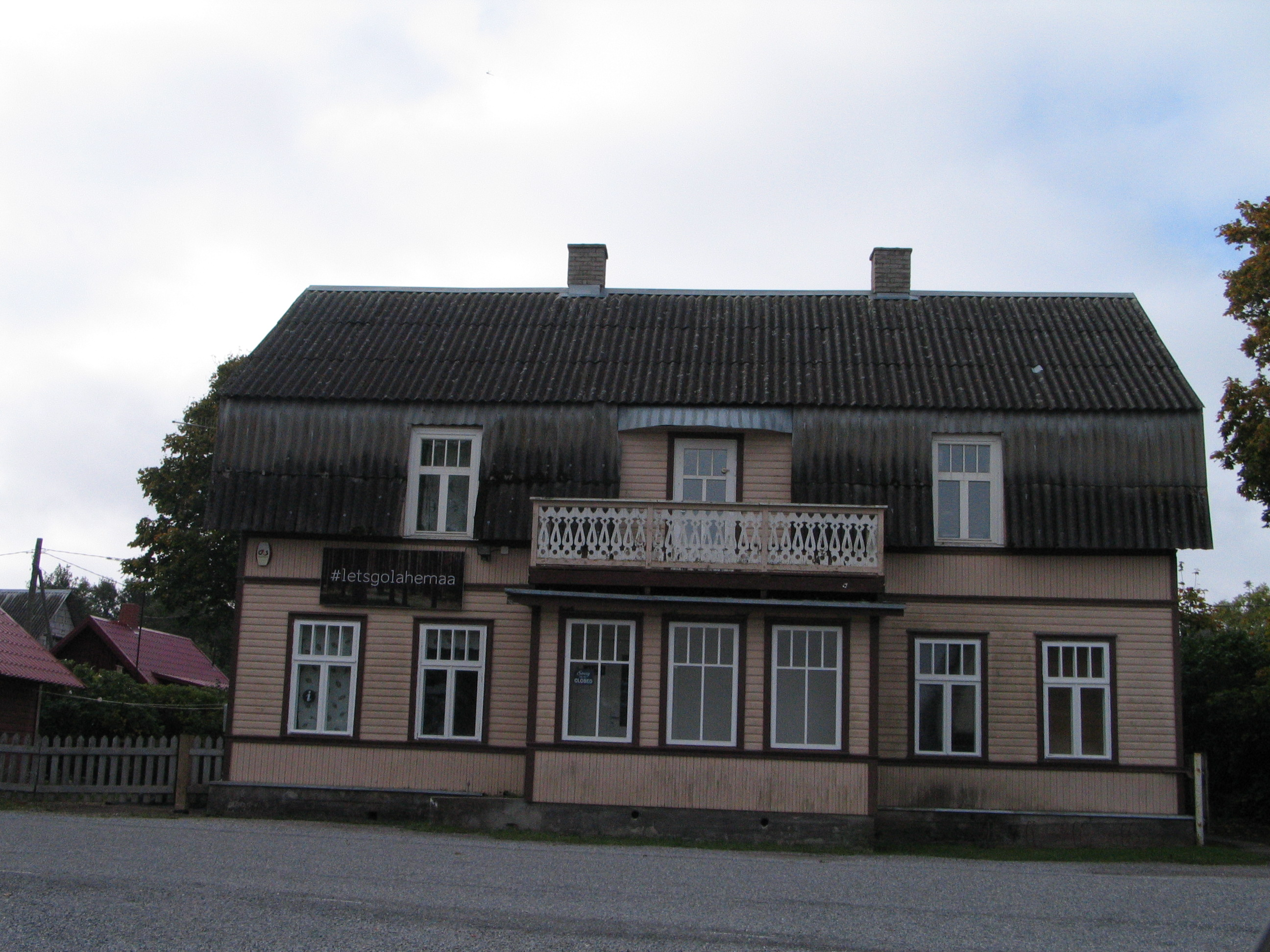
Local shop (now defunct)
