= Jaan Manitski =

Estonian businessman, politician and art collector

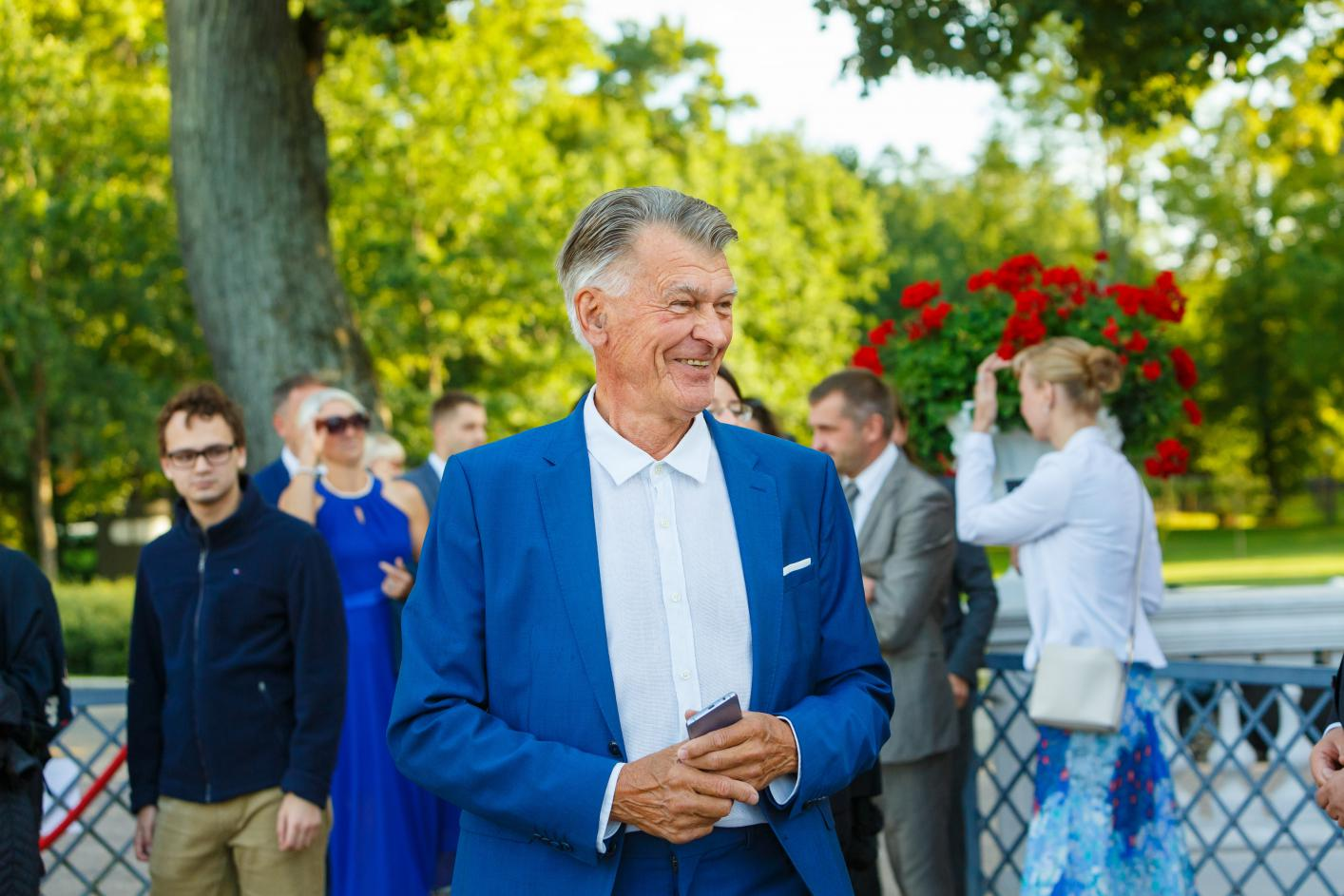
- Jaan Manitski (2018)

Minister of Foreign Affairs (Estonia)
- In office April 1992 – October 1992
- Prime Minister: Tiit Vähi
- Preceded by: Lennart Meri
- Succeeded by: Trivimi Velliste

Personal details
- Born: 7 March 1942 (age 84) Viinistu, Estonia

Jaan Manitski (born 7 March 1942 in Viinistu) is an Estonian businessman, politician and art collector. He served as the Minister of Foreign Affairs of Estonia in 1992.

== Biography ==
Manistki was born in Viinistu, on the coast of the Gulf of Finland. He and his parents escaped to Finland and then to Sweden in 1943, when he was only one and a half years old. Manistki was ABBA's financial manager. He lived in exile while Estonia was under Soviet control, returning in 1989, after the country regained its independence.

He worked as a mushroom farmer before becoming foreign minister in 1992. He later became part-owner of the daily newspaper Eesti Päevaleht, and he opened the Viinistu Art Museum in 2003.

Preceded by Lennart Meri	Minister of Foreign Affairs; April 1992 – October 1992	Succeeded by Trivimi Velliste
