= Julius Seljamaa =

Estonian politician, diplomat and journalist

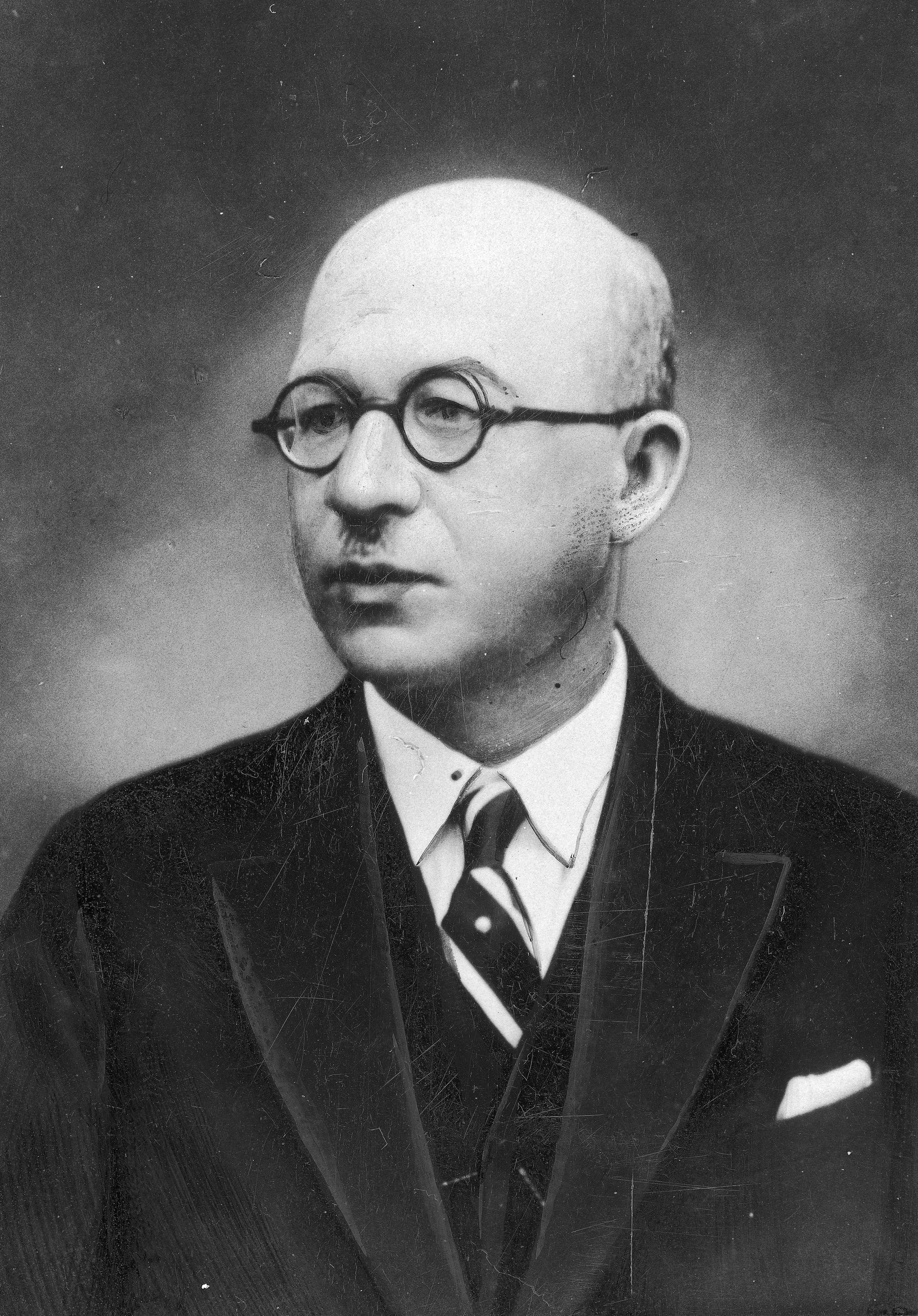
- Julius Seljamaa c. 1933–1934

Minister of Foreign Affairs of Estonia
- In office 21 October 1933 – 2 June 1936
- Preceded by: Ants Piip
- Succeeded by: Friedrich Akel

Personal details
- Born: Julius Friedrich Seljamaa; 8 April 1883 Sindi, Pärnu County, Governorate of Livonia, Russian Empire
- Died: 17 June 1936 (aged 53) Tallinn, Estonia
- Resting place: Rahumäe Cemetery
- Party: Estonian Labour Party
- Education: Saint Petersburg State University

Julius Friedrich Seljamaa (8 April [O.S. 27 March] 1883 – 17 June 1936) was an Estonian politician, diplomat and journalist. From 1933 to 1936, he was the Estonian Minister of Foreign Affairs.

== Biography ==
Seljamaa was born in Sindi, Pärnu County. He studied in Riga from 1899 to 1902, and then worked as a teacher and later director at a school in Taali from 1902 until 1909. From 1909 until 1914, he worked at a school in Rakvere. He then moved to Saint Petersburg to study law at Saint Petersburg State University and work as a journalist. During the Russian Revolution in 1917, Seljamaa participated as a delegate to the First All-Russian Congress of Soviets of Workers' and Soldiers' Deputies, and served as a member of the first All-Russian Central Executive Committee for the Estonian Labour Party.

After graduating, Seljamaa returned to Estonia shortly after the country's declaration of independence in February 1918. Upon the death of Jüri Vilms in 1918, Seljamaa succeeded him as chairman of the Estonian Labour Party, as well as editor-in-chief of the party's newspaper Vaba Maa from 1918 until 1921. Together with Johan Laidoner he became Estonia's representative to the Soviet Union, and participated in the negotiations of the Treaty of Tartu in 1919 and 1920. He was elected to the Estonian Constituent Assembly in 1919, where he was a member of the National Defence Committee.

In 1920, Seljamaa was elected to the I Riigikogu, but resigned in 1922 upon being appointed Estonian envoy in Latvia, a post he held until 1928; between 1925 and 1926 he was also accredited to Lithuania. From 1928 until 1933, he served as envoy to the Soviet Union. From 1933 until shortly before his death in 1936, he was the Estonian Minister of Foreign Affairs.

Seljamaa died in Tallinn, shortly after being appointed Estonian envoy in Rome. He is buried at Rahumäe Cemetery in Tallinn.

== Honours ==
=== National honours ===
- Estonia: Cross of Liberty, III class, 2nd degree (1920)
- Estonia: Order of the Estonian Red Cross, 1st class (1932)
- Estonia: Order of the Cross of the Eagle, 1st class (1934)

Political offices
Preceded by Ants Piip	Minister of Foreign Affairs of Estonia; 1933–1936	Succeeded by Friedrich Akel
Diplomatic posts
Preceded by Aleksander Hellat	Envoy of Estonia to Latvia; 1922–1928	Succeeded by Eduard Virgo
Preceded by Heinrich Laretei	Envoy of Estonia to the Soviet Union; 1928–1933	Succeeded by Karl Tofer
