= Kaarel Robert Pusta =

Estonian politician (1883–1964)

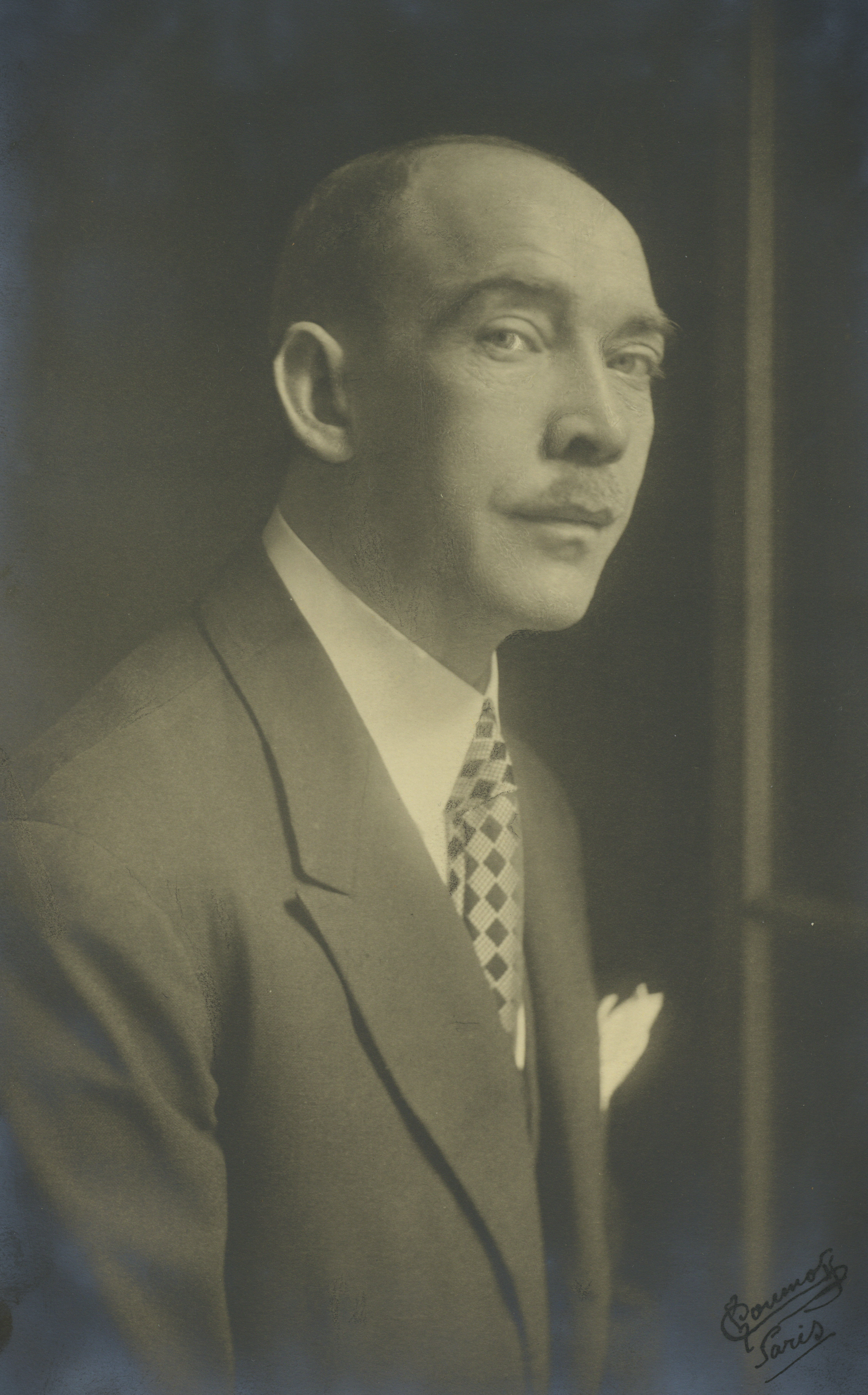
Pusta in 1931

Kaarel Robert Pusta (also Karl Robert Pusta; 1 March 1883, Narva – 4 May 1964, Madrid) was an Estonian politician and a former Minister of Foreign Affairs of Estonia. During the Second World War, he served as special assistant to the consulate general of Estonia.

== Honours ==
- 1925: Grand Cordon Order of Leopold
- 1925: Order of the Three Stars, 1st Class

Preceded by Ado Birk	Minister of Foreign Affairs of Estonia; 1920	Succeeded by Otto Strandman
Preceded by Otto Strandman	Minister of Foreign Affairs of Estonia; 1924–1925	Succeeded by Ants Piip
