= Minister of Foreign Affairs (Estonia) =

Estonian cabinet position

Minister of Foreign Affairs of the Republic of Estonia
- Estonian: Eesti Vabariigi Välisminister

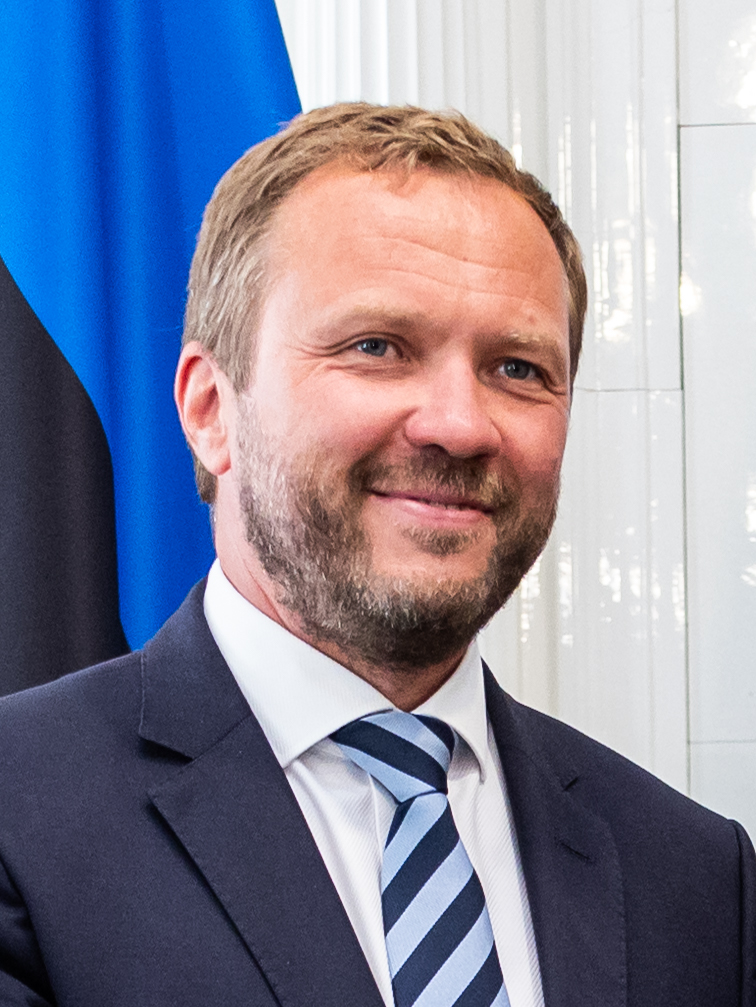
- Incumbent; Margus Tsahkna since 17 April 2023
- Ministry of Foreign Affairs
- Formation: 24 February 1918
- First holder: Jaan Poska
- Website: vm.ee

The Minister of Foreign Affairs (Estonian: välisminister) is the senior minister at the Ministry of Foreign Affairs (Estonian: Eesti Vabariigi Välisministeerium) in the Estonian Government. The Minister is one of the most important members of the Estonian government, with responsibility for the relations between Estonia and foreign states.

The Foreign Minister is chosen by the Prime Minister as a part of the government. The current Foreign Minister is Margus Tsahkna.

== Office holders ==
#	Name	Took office	Left office	Party
1	Jaan Poska	24 February 1918	20 September 1919	Estonian People's Party
2	Ants Piip	9 October 1919	18 November 1919	Estonian Labour Party
3	Ado Birk	18 November 1919	28 July 1920	Estonian People's Party
4	Kaarel Robert Pusta	28 July 1920	30 July 1920	
5	Ado Birk (2nd term)	30 July 1920	26 October 1920	Estonian People's Party
6	Otto Strandman	26 October 1920	14 January 1921	Estonian Labour Party
7	Ants Piip (2nd term)	25 January 1921	20 October 1922	Estonian Labour Party
8	Aleksander Hellat	28 November 1922	2 August 1923	
9	Friedrich Akel	2 August 1923	26 March 1924	Christian People's Party
10	Otto Strandman (2nd term)	26 March 1924	14 May 1924	Estonian Labour Party
11	Kaarel Robert Pusta (2nd term)	6 June 1924	5 October 1925	
12	Ado Birk (3rd term)	23 October 1925	15 December 1925	Estonian People's Party
13	Ants Piip (3rd term)	15 December 1925	23 July 1926	Estonian Labour Party
14	Friedrich Akel (2nd term)	23 July 1926	11 November 1927	Christian People's Party
15	Aleksander Hellat (2nd term)	11 November 1927	9 December 1927	
16	Hans Rebane	9 December 1927	4 December 1928	Farmers' Assemblies
17	Jaan Lattik	4 December 1928	12 February 1931	Christian People's Party
18	Jaan Tõnisson	12 February 1931	19 July 1932	Estonian People's Party
19	Mihkel Pung	19 July 1932	1 November 1932	National Centre Party
20	August Rei	1 November 1932	18 May 1933	Estonian Socialist Workers' Party
21	Ants Piip (4th term)	18 May 1933	21 October 1933	National Centre Party
22	Julius Seljamaa	21 October 1933	2 June 1936	
23	Friedrich Akel (3rd term)	2 June 1936	9 May 1938	
24	Karl Selter	9 May 1938	12 October 1939	
25	Ants Piip (5th term)	12 October 1939	21 June 1940	
26	August Rei	18 September 1944	25 September 1944	
	Aleksander Warma (in exile)	1953	1963	
	August Koern (in exile)	1964	1982	
	Elmar Lipping (in exile)	1982	1990	
	Olev Olesk (in exile)	1990	1992	
27	Lennart Meri	11 April 1990	24 March 1992	Popular Front of Estonia
28	Jaan Manitski	6 April 1992	21 October 1992	(none)
29	Trivimi Velliste	21 October 1992	7 January 1994	Pro Patria Union
30	Jüri Luik	8 January 1994	17 April 1995	Pro Patria Union
31	Riivo Sinijärv	17 April 1995	6 November 1995	Estonian Coalition Party
32	Siim Kallas	6 November 1995	22 November 1996	Estonian Reform Party
33	Toomas Hendrik Ilves	2 December 1996	14 October 1998	Social Democratic Party
34	Raul Mälk	14 October 1998	25 March 1999	(none)
35	Toomas Hendrik Ilves (2nd term)	25 March 1999	28 January 2002	Social Democratic Party
36	Kristiina Ojuland	28 January 2002	10 February 2005	Estonian Reform Party
37	Rein Lang	21 February 2005	13 April 2005	Estonian Reform Party
38	Urmas Paet	13 April 2005	17 November 2014	Estonian Reform Party
39	Keit Pentus-Rosimannus	17 November 2014	16 July 2015	Estonian Reform Party
40	Marina Kaljurand	16 July 2015	12 September 2016	Independent
41	Jürgen Ligi	12 September 2016	23 November 2016	Estonian Reform Party
42	Sven Mikser	23 November 2016	29 April 2019	Social Democratic Party
43	Urmas Reinsalu	29 April 2019	26 January 2021	Isamaa
44	Eva-Maria Liimets	26 January 2021	3 June 2022	Estonian Centre Party
45	Urmas Reinsalu (2nd term)	18 July 2022	17 April 2023	Isamaa
46	Margus Tsahkna	17 April 2023	Incumbent	Estonia 200

== See also ==
- Foreign relations of Estonia
