= Merry Bullock =

American psychologist

Merry Bullock (born 5 February 1950), is an American psychologist. She studied at Brown University for her BA and University of Pennsylvania for her PhD, both in psychology.

She is currently Secretary-General of the International Council of Psychologists and co-chair of the Global Network of Psychologists for Human Rights. Formerly she was senior director of the American Psychological Association's (APA's) Office of International Affairs. In that role, she coordinated APA's representation at the United Nations.

Bullock served as Deputy Secretary-General of the International Union of Psychological Science (IUPsyS), as editor for IUPsyS's web portal Psychology Resources Around the World, and as associate editor for IUPsyS' International Journal of Psychology focusing on its International Platform.

She was formerly married to Estonian president Toomas Hendrik Ilves, with whom she had two children: son Luukas Kristjan (b. 1987) and daughter Juulia Kristiine (b. 1992).
