= Trivimi Velliste =

Estonian politician (born 1947)

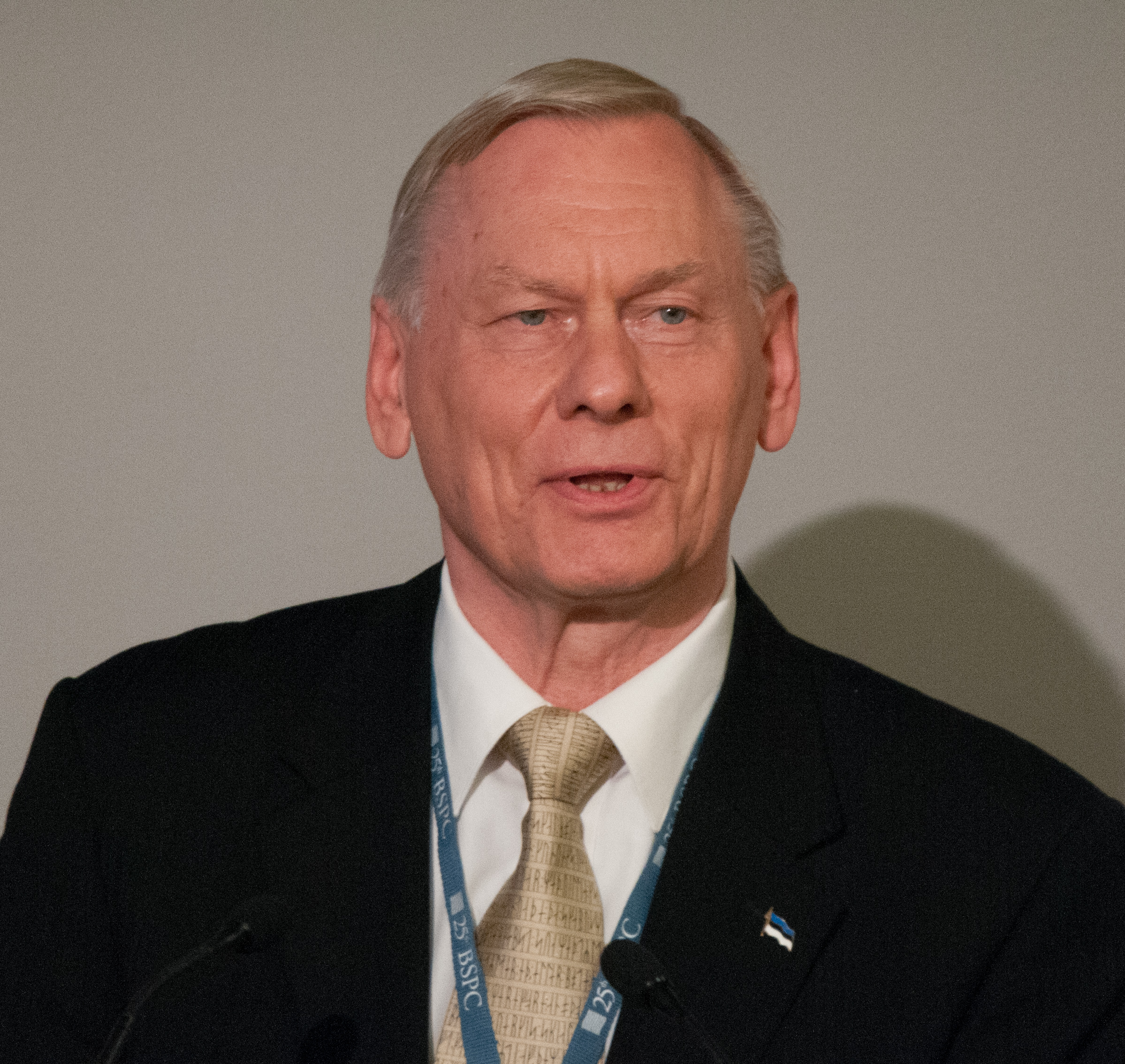
- Velliste in 2016

Minister of Foreign Affairs
- In office October 1992 – January 1994
- Prime Minister: Mart Laar
- Preceded by: Jaan Manitski
- Succeeded by: Jüri Luik

Personal details
- Born: 4 May 1947 (age 79) Tartu, then part of Estonian SSR, Soviet Union
- Party: Pro Patria Union

Trivimi Velliste (born 4 May 1947, in Tartu, Estonia) is an Estonian politician who served as Minister of Foreign Affairs from 1992 to 1994 and as the Estonian Ambassador to the United Nations from 1994 to 1998. He currently is a Member of Parliament in the Riigikogu representing the Pärnumaa Electoral District.

Velliste is considered one of the leading forces behind the liberation of the Baltic States. His fight for Estonian identity as a foundation for the struggle to gain independence was an affront to the Russians and was conducted at great personal risk. Velliste deliberately encouraged the drive for national and political freedom. In accordance with his beliefs, he founded a society for the protection of Estonian historical monuments. Velliste considered knowledge of the past to be a necessity in the fight for elementary human rights on the road to self-government and self-confidence.

In 1988, Mr Velliste was awarded the second Rafto Prize. In 2009, he was awarded Order of Polonia Restituta.

Political offices
Preceded by Jaan Manitski	Minister of Foreign Affairs; October 1992 – January 1994	Succeeded by Jüri Luik
Diplomatic posts
Preceded by Ernst Jaakson	Permanent Representative of Estonia to the United Nations; 1994–1998	Succeeded by Sven Jürgenson
