= Friedrich Akel =

Estonian diplomat and politician (1871–1941)

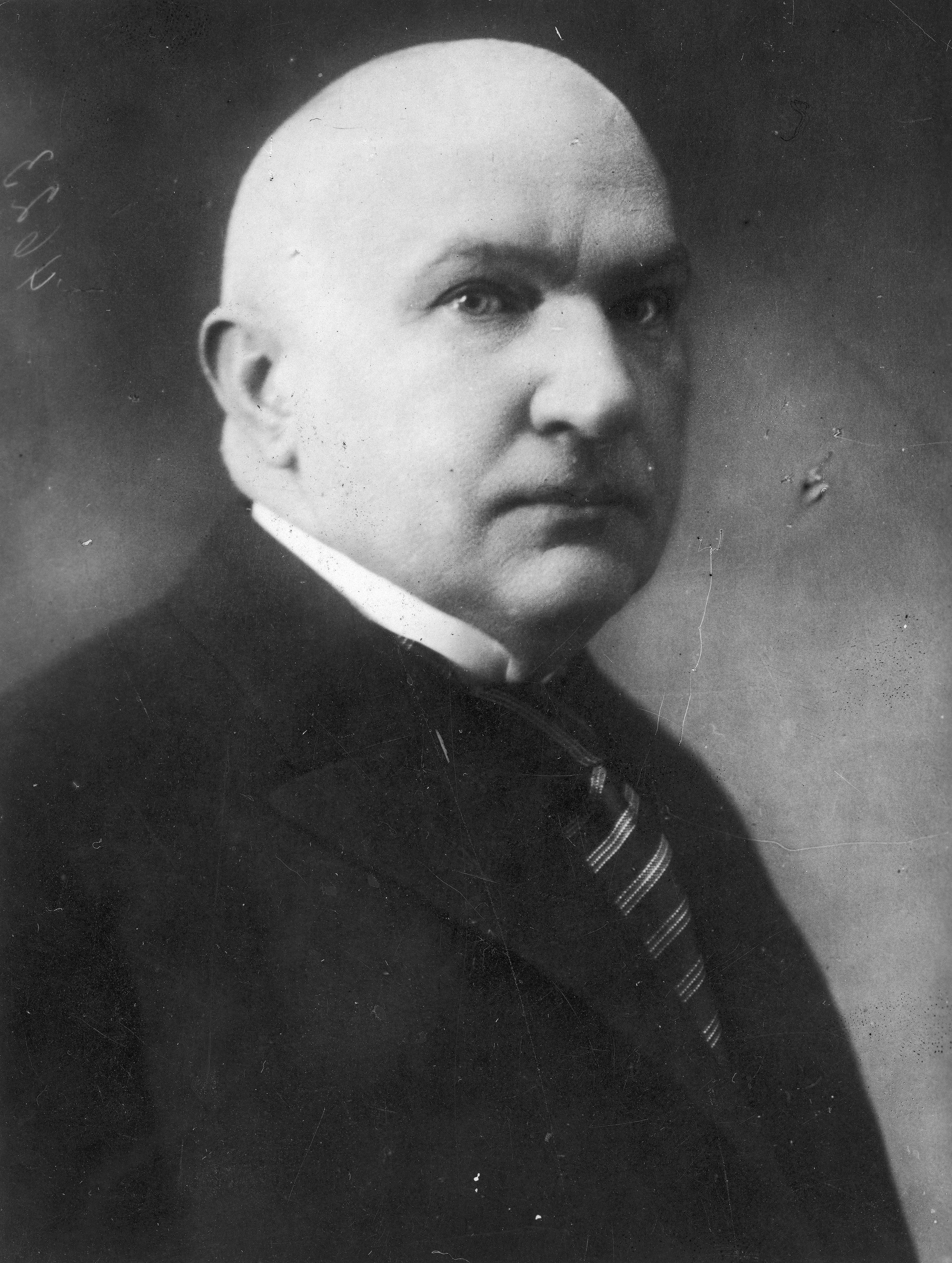
- Friedrich Akel in 1924

5th State Elder of Estonia
- In office 26 March 1924 – 16 December 1924
- Preceded by: Konstantin Päts
- Succeeded by: Jüri Jaakson

Minister of Foreign Affairs of Estonia
- In office 2 June 1936 – 9 May 1938
- Preceded by: Julius Seljamaa
- Succeeded by: Karl Selter
- In office 23 July 1926 – 11 November 1927
- Preceded by: Ants Piip
- Succeeded by: Aleksander Hellat
- In office 2 August 1923 – 26 March 1924
- Preceded by: Aleksander Hellat
- Succeeded by: Otto Strandman

Personal details
- Born: Friedrich Karl Akel; 5 September 1871 Kaubi parish, Kreis Pernau, Governorate of Estonia, Russian Empire
- Died: 3 July 1941 (aged 69) Tallinn, then part of Estonian SSR, Soviet Union
- Cause of death: Execution by shooting
- Party: Christian People's Party
- Relations: Erik von Sydow (son-in-law)

Friedrich Karl Akel (5 September [O.S. 24 August] 1871 in Kaubi (now Pornuse) village, Mulgi Parish – 3 July 1941 in Tallinn) was an Estonian diplomat and politician who served as State Elder of Estonia in 1924.

== Early years ==
Akel was born in Kaubi village (now Pornuse) in Mulgi Parish. He attended the Alexander Gymnasium in Tartu, and studied in the department of medicine of the University of Tartu in 1892–1897. After graduating, he worked as an assistant at the Tartu University Clinic before being employed as a doctor at Reimers ophthalmology clinic in Riga in 1898. The following year, he started working as a doctor in the Ujazdów military hospital in Warsaw. In 1901, he continued his studies in Berlin, Prague and Leipzig.

After briefly returning as a doctor at Reimers ophthalmology clinic, Akel practiced a private ophthalmologist in Tallinn between 1902 and 1912, with an exception for 1904–1905, when he served as an army physician in the Russo-Japanese War. In 1907 he was one of the founders of the Private Clinic of Estonian Physicians, and in 1912 he founded his own eye clinic. He was also a member and chairman of the Tallinn Municipal Council, and honorary justice of the peace in the Tallinn-Haapsalu Peace Council.

Akel was a member the board of the Northern Baltic Union of Physicians and the Tallinn Popular Education Society, chairman of the sports society "Kalev", building society of "Estonia" theatre and the Estonian Society "Estonia" in Tallinn, member and chairman of the council and member of the Board of the Tallinn Loan and Savings Society (later the Tallinn Credit Bank) and vice president of the consistory of the Estonian Evangelical Lutheran Church in 1920–1922.

== Political career ==
Akel was Estonia's Elder of State between March and December 1924. During his term as Elder of State, the Communist Party of Estonia carried out a failed coup d'état attempt on 1 December; while Akel escaped unharmed, Minister of Transport Karl Kark was killed.

Akel was also Minister of Foreign Affairs in 1923–1924, 1926–1927 and 1936–1938, and Estonian envoy to Sweden and Denmark in 1928–1934 and Germany and the Netherlands in 1934–1936. In 1927–1932, Akel was Estonia's representative to the International Olympic Committee.

From 1926 until 1929, Akel was a member of the III Riigikogu, representing the Christian People's Party. Later, he was a member of the Estonian National Assembly (Rahvuskogu) in 1937, and of the Riiginõukogu (the upper chamber of Parliament) in 1938–1940.

== Arrest and execution ==
Following the June 1940 Soviet invasion and occupation of Estonia and the other Baltic states in June 1940, Akel was imprisoned by the NKVD in October 1940. He was executed by shooting in Tallinn on 3 July 1941. His wife, Adele Karoline Tenz, was deported to the USSR in June 1941 and died there in 1944.

Akel's daughter Lia Akel (1918–2009) married Swedish diplomat Erik von Sydow on 20 January 1940 in Tallinn.

== Honours ==
=== National honours ===
- Estonia: Knight of the Order of the Estonian Red Cross, 2nd class (1927)
- Estonia: Knight of the Order of the Cross of the Eagle, 1st class (1935)
- Estonia: Knight of the Order of the Estonian Red Cross, 1st class (1936)
- Estonia: Knight of the Order of the White Star, 1st class (1938)

=== Foreign honours ===
- Latvia: Order of the Three Stars (1925)
- Sweden: Commander Grand Cross of the Order of the Polar Star (1934)
- Poland: Order of the White Eagle

== References and sources ==
Sources

- Friedrich (Karl) Akel
- Ülo Kaevats et al. 2000. Eesti Entsüklopeedia, volume 14. Tallinn: Eesti Entsüklopeediakirjastus, ISBN 978-9985-70-064-8

| Preceded by Konstantin Päts | State Elder of Estonia; 1924 | Succeeded by Jüri Jaakson |
| Preceded by Aleksander Hellat | Minister of Foreign Affairs; 1923–1924 | Succeeded by Otto Strandman |
| Preceded by Ants Piip | Minister of Foreign Affairs; 1926–1927 | Succeeded by Aleksander Hellat |
| Preceded by Julius Seljamaa | Minister of Foreign Affairs; 1936–1938 | Succeeded by Karl Selter |
