= Ants Piip =

Estonian politician and diplomat

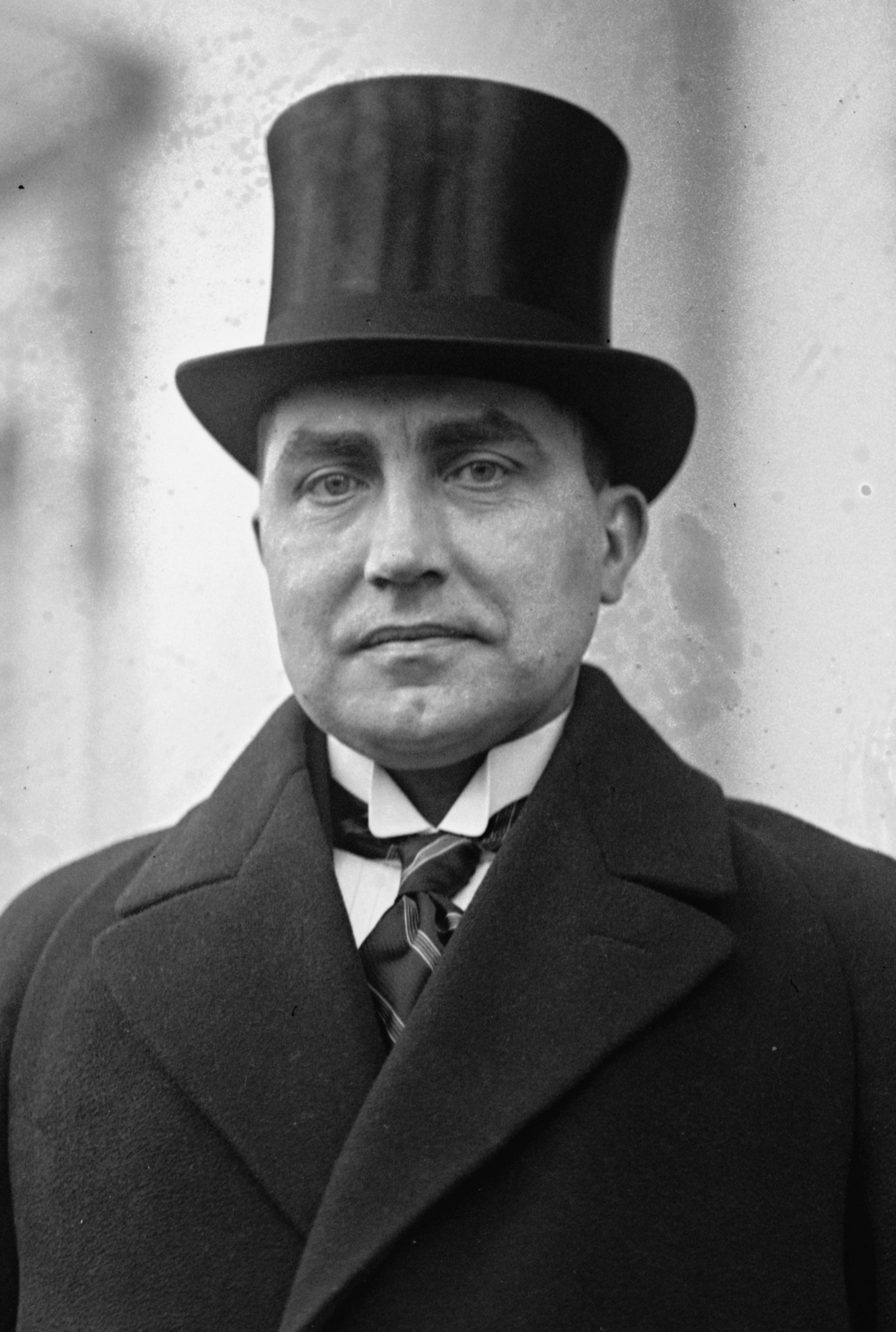
- Ants Piip, 1923

State Elder of Estonia
- In office 20 December 1920 – 25 January 1921
- Preceded by: himself as Prime Minister
- Succeeded by: Konstantin Päts

Prime Minister of Estonia
- In office 26 October 1920 – 20 December 1920
- Preceded by: Jaan Tõnisson
- Succeeded by: himself as State Elder

Personal details
- Born: 28 February 1884 Tuhalaane, Kreis Fellin, Governorate of Livonia, Russian Empire
- Died: 1 October 1942 (aged 58) Nyrobsky camp, Molotov Oblast, Soviet Union
- Party: Estonian Labour Party, later none
- Profession: lawyer, diplomat, politician

Ants Piip VR III/1 (also Anton or Hans Piip; 28 February [O.S. 16 February] 1884 in Tuhalaane, Kreis Fellin – 1 October 1942 in Nyrobsky camp, Perm Oblast, Russian SFSR) was an Estonian lawyer, diplomat and politician. Piip was the 1st Head of State of Estonia and the 5th Prime Minister of Estonia. Piip played a key role in internationalising the independence aspirations of Estonia during the Paris Peace Conference following World War I.

== Education ==
Son of a small independent farmer, Piip took his high school exams at the Kuressaare State High School and studied at Teachers' Seminar in Kuldīga (formerly Goldingen), now in Latvia. In 1903–1905, he was a parish clerk and schoolteacher at Alūksne, also a teacher in the Emperor Nikolai Eastern Orthodox Parish School in Kuressaare in 1905–1906, in the Kuressaare Marine School in 1906–1912, and in the Janson Merchant School in Saint Petersburg in 1913–1915. He studied at the law department of the Saint Petersburg University in 1908–1913 and received a scientific scholarship from the Saint Petersburg University in 1913–1916, during that time he worked in the Russian Justice and Interior Ministries. Piip took additional courses in the Berlin University in 1912.

== Career ==
Piip was a member of the Estonian Province Assembly (Estonian: Maapäev), and later a member of the Constituent Assembly (Asutav Kogu), and after that, of the Riigikogu. In 1917–1919, Piip was a member of the Estonian Foreign Mission in Saint Petersburg and in London, he participated in the Paris Peace Conference. In 1919 he was Deputy to the Minister of Foreign Affairs, 1919–1920 Member of the Estonian delegation in the Tartu peace negotiations between Estonia and the Russian SFSR. In 1919–1940 he was Professor of International Law in Tartu University. In 1920, he was the diplomatic representative the Republic of Estonia in Great Britain. 1920–1921, while Head of State, Piip was also the Minister of War. He held position of Minister of Foreign Affairs five times, also he was in 1923–1925 the Envoy of Estonia to the United States of America. During 1938–1940, Piip was also member of the Riigivolikogu (first chamber of the Riigikogu).

Piip was arrested by the NKVD on 30 June 1941 and he died in a Soviet prison camp NyrobLag the next year.

== Quote ==
Ants Piip, in 1934 in Riga, emphasised the importance of regional co-operation in preserving Baltic independence:

The law of history is the following: if the nations inhabiting the shores of the Baltic Sea are not able to create between themselves a stronger organisation, they are doomed inevitably to submit to a stronger European power of the respective period.

== Awards ==
- 1920 – Cross of Liberty III/I
- 1926 – Order of the Three Stars I (Latvia)
- 1932 – Order of the Estonian Red Cross I/II
- 1934 – Order of the Cross of the Eagle I
- 1940 – Order of the White Star I

Preceded by Jaan Tõnisson	Prime Minister of Estonia; 1920	Succeeded by State Elder of Estonia
Preceded by Prime Minister of Estonia	State Elder of Estonia; 1920–1921	Succeeded by Konstantin Päts
Preceded by Aleksander Tõnisson	Minister of War; 1920–1921	Succeeded by Jaan Soots
Preceded by Jaan Poska	Minister of Foreign Affairs; 1919	Succeeded by Ado Birk
Preceded by Otto Strandman	Minister of Foreign Affairs; 1921–1922	Succeeded by Aleksander Hellat
Preceded by Kaarel Robert Pusta	Minister of Foreign Affairs; 1925–1926	Succeeded by Friedrich Akel
Preceded by August Rei	Minister of Foreign Affairs; 1933	Succeeded by Julius Seljamaa
Preceded by Karl Selter	Minister of Foreign Affairs; 1939–1940	Succeeded by August Rei (in exile)
