= Aleksander Hellat =

Estonian politician

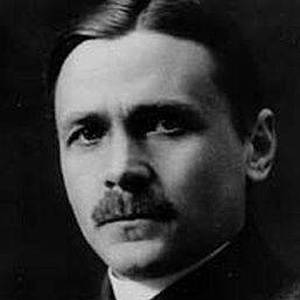
Aleksander Hellat

Aleksander Hellat (20 August [O.S. 8 August] 1881, in Tartu – 28 November 1943, in Kemerovo Oblast) was an Estonian politician and a Minister of Foreign Affairs of Estonia. He was a member of the Estonian Social Democratic Workers' Party. After Estonia had been annexed by the Soviet Union, Hellat was arrested in 1940 by the NKVD and deported to a prison camp in Siberia, where he died three years later.

Political offices
Preceded by Aleksander Pallas	Mayor of Tallinn; 1918–1919	Succeeded by Anton Uesson
Preceded by Ants Piip	Minister of Foreign Affairs of Estonia; 1922–1923	Succeeded by Friedrich Akel
Preceded by Friedrich Akel	Minister of Foreign Affairs of Estonia; 1927	Succeeded by Hans Rebane
Diplomatic posts
Preceded by Office created	Estonian Minister in Riga; 1920–1922	Succeeded by Julius Seljamaa
