= Raul Mälk =

Estonian politician and diplomat

Minister of Foreign Affairs
- In office October 1998 – March 1999
- Prime Minister: Mart Siimann
- Preceded by: Toomas Hendrik Ilves
- Succeeded by: Toomas Hendrik Ilves

Personal details
- Born: 14 May 1952 (age 74) Pärnu, Estonia

Raul Mälk (born 14 May 1952) is an Estonian diplomat who served as Minister of Foreign Affairs of Estonia from 1998 to 1999. He was also head of the Estonian delegation for border negotiations with Russia from 1992 to 2005. Up to 2007, he was Chairman of the Board of International Centre for Defence Studies in Estonia.

Mälk graduated cum laude from Tartu State University with a degree in economic cybernetics. From 1992 until 1993, Mälk was an advisor to the Minister of Foreign Affairs. From 1993 until 1994, he was the Chief of the Minister's Office. From 1994 until 1996, he was the Vice-Chancellor for Political and Press Affairs, and from 1996 until 2001, he was the Estonian ambassador to the United Kingdom, during which period, from 14 October 1998 until 25 March 1999 (after the resignation of Toomas Hendrik Ilves), he was also Minister of Foreign Affairs. Between 2003 and 2006, he was the ambassador to the Republic of Ireland.

Preceded by Toomas Hendrik Ilves	Minister of Foreign Affairs of Estonia; October 1998 – March 1999	Succeeded by Toomas Hendrik Ilves
