= Elmar Lipping =

Estonian statesman and soldier

Elmar Lipping (7 March 1906 in Riga – 5 January 1994 in New York City) was an Estonian statesman and soldier. He emigrated to the United States and lived in Flushing, Queens. He was Estonian foreign minister in exile from June 3, 1982 to June 20, 1990.

Political offices
Preceded by August Koern	Estonian Minister of Foreign Affairs in exile 1982–1990	Succeeded by Olev Olesk
