= August Koern =

Estonian statesman and diplomat

August Koern (27 April 1900 in Uue-Võidu, Viljandi County – 11 January 1989 in Copenhagen) was an Estonian statesman and diplomat. He was Estonian foreign minister in exile from 1 March 1964 to 3 June 1982.

| Preceded by Aleksander Warma | Estonian Minister of Foreign Affairs in exile 1964–1982 | Succeeded by Elmar Lipping |
