= Toomas Hendrik Ilves =

President of Estonia from 2006 to 2016

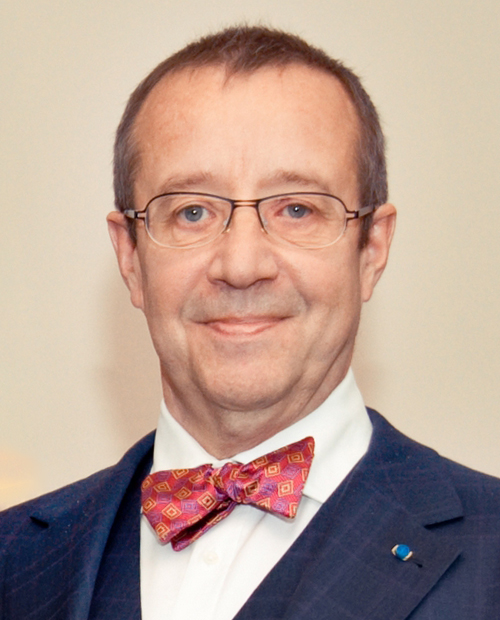
- Ilves in 2011

4th President of Estonia
- In office 9 October 2006 – 10 October 2016
- Prime Minister: Andrus Ansip; Taavi Rõivas
- Preceded by: Arnold Rüütel
- Succeeded by: Kersti Kaljulaid

Minister of Foreign Affairs
- In office 25 March 1999 – 28 January 2002
- Prime Minister: Mart Laar
- Preceded by: Raul Mälk
- Succeeded by: Kristiina Ojuland
- In office November 1996 – October 1998
- Prime Minister: Tiit Vähi; Mart Siimann
- Preceded by: Siim Kallas
- Succeeded by: Raul Mälk

Personal details
- Born: 26 December 1953 (age 72) Stockholm, Sweden
- Party: Social Democratic Party (Before 2006); Independent (2006–2025); Volt Europa (2025-present)
- Spouses: Merry Bullock (m. 1981; div. 2004) Evelin Int (m. 2004; div. 2015) Ieva Kupče (m. 2016; div. 2023)
- Children: 4
- Education: Columbia University; University of Pennsylvania

Toomas Hendrik Ilves (Estonian pronunciation: [ˈtoːmɑs ˈhendrik ˈilves]; born 26 December 1953) is an Estonian politician who served as the fourth president of Estonia from 2006 until 2016.

Ilves worked as a diplomat and journalist, and he was the leader of the Social Democratic Party in the 1990s. He served in the government as Minister of Foreign Affairs from 1996 to 1998 and again from 1999 to 2002. Later, he was a Member of the European Parliament from 2004 to 2006. He was elected as President of Estonia by an electoral college on 23 September 2006 and his term as President began on 9 October 2006. He was reelected by Parliament in 2011.

On 1 May 2025, Ilves announced that he had "broken with my promise to avoid all party politics" and joined Volt Europa.

== Early life and education ==
Ilves was born in Stockholm, Sweden; his parents Endel Ilves (1923–1991) and Irene Ilves (née Rebane; 1925–2018) fled Estonia after its occupation by the Soviet Union during World War II. It had been reported that his maternal grandmother was a Russian from Saint Petersburg, but Ilves clarified this, stating that she was an ethnic Karaim.

Ilves moved to the United States with his family in 1957 and grew up in Leonia, New Jersey. He graduated from Leonia High School in 1972 as valedictorian. He received a bachelor's degree in psychology from Columbia University in 1976 and a master's degree in the same subject from the University of Pennsylvania in 1978. He also received an honorary degree from St. Olaf College in 2014 in recognition of his relationship with the college. In addition to his native Estonian, Ilves also speaks English, German, Spanish and Latvian. By Ilves's own admission, he speaks Estonian with a comparatively strong American accent, on account of spending his formative and young adult years in America and Germany.

== Career ==
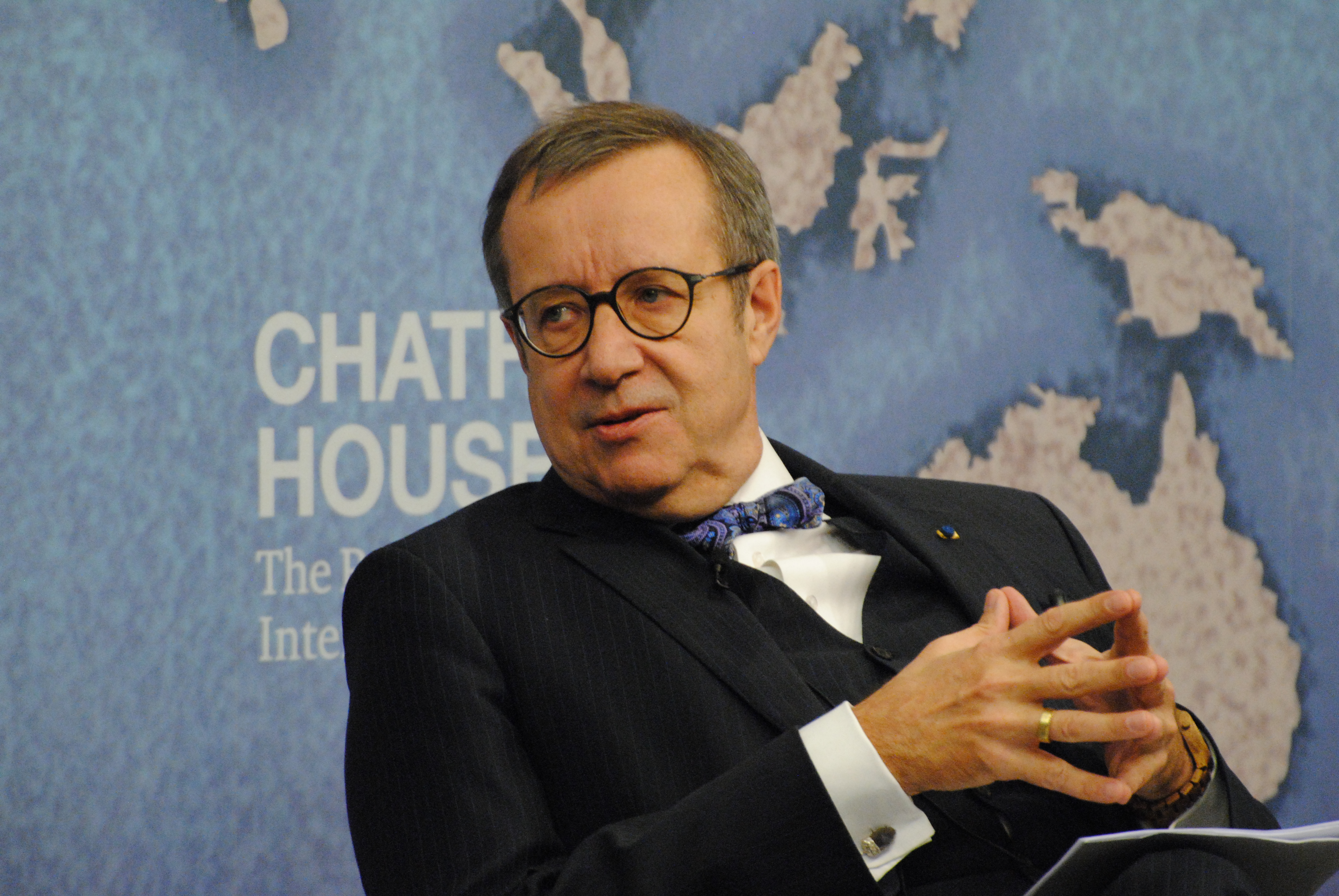
Toomas Hendrik Ilves

Ilves worked as a research assistant in Columbia University Department of Psychology from 1973 to 1979. From 1979 to 1981 he served as assistant director and English teacher at the Open Education Center in Englewood, New Jersey. Ilves then moved to Vancouver, British Columbia, Canada; from 1981 to 1983 he was director and administrator of arts at Vancouver Arts Centre and from 1983 to 1985, he taught Estonian literature and linguistics at Simon Fraser University.

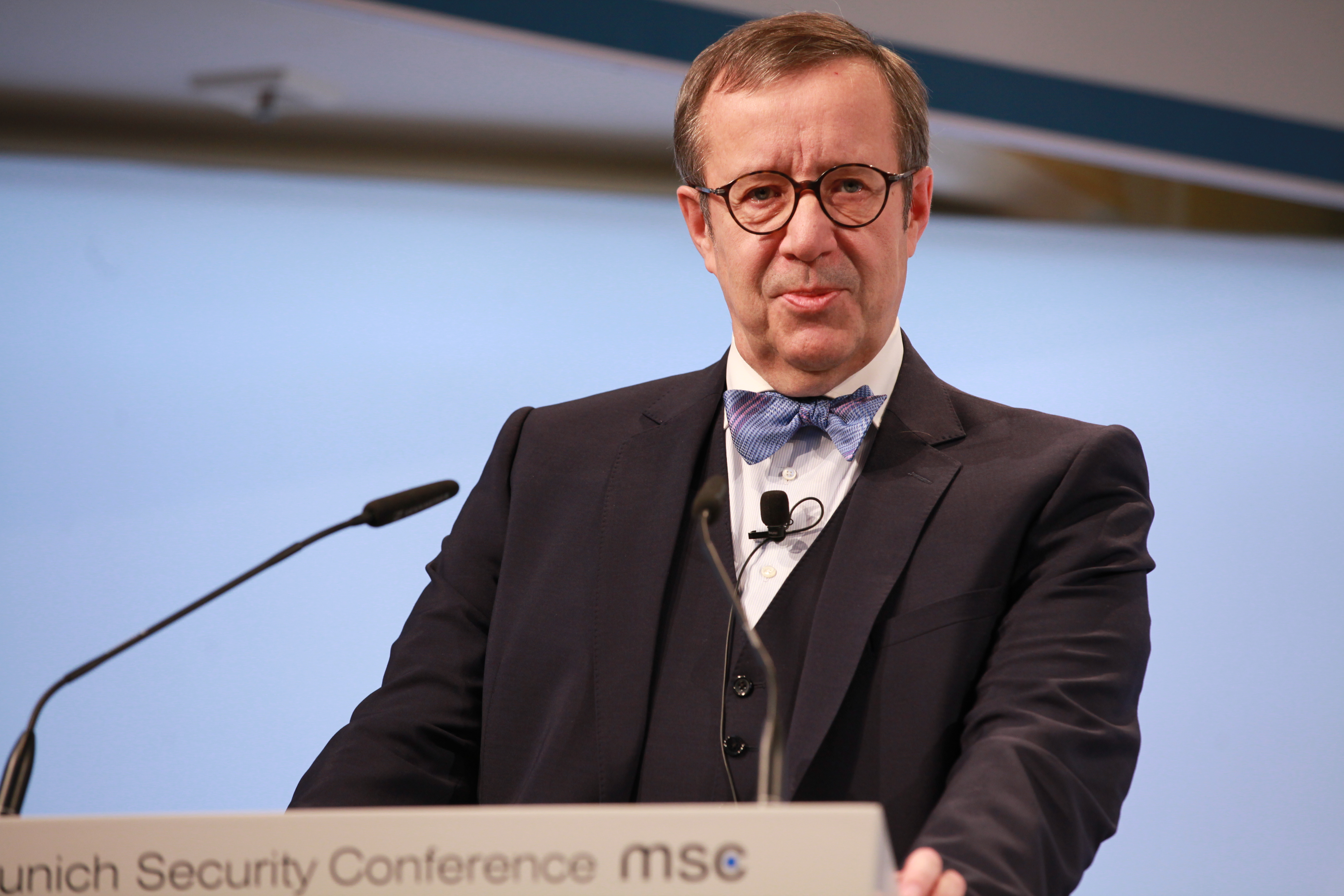
Ilves during the MSC 2016

From 1985 to 1993, Ilves worked in Munich, Germany as a journalist for Radio Free Europe, being the head of its Estonian desk since 1988. As Estonia had restored its independence in 1991, Ilves became Ambassador of Estonia to the United States in 1993, also serving as Ambassador to Canada and Mexico at the same time. As a condition for the job, he had to renounce his US citizenship.

In December 1996, Ilves became Estonian Minister of Foreign Affairs, serving until he resigned in September 1998, when he became a member of a small opposition party (Peasants' Party, agrarian-conservative). Ilves was soon elected chairman of the People's Party (reformed Peasants' Party), which formed an electoral cartel with the Moderates, a centrist party. After the March 1999 parliamentary election he became foreign minister again, serving until 2002, when the so-called Triple Alliance collapsed. He supported Estonian membership in the European Union and succeeded in starting the negotiations which led to Estonia joining the European Union on 1 May 2004. From 2001 to 2002 he was the leader of the People's Party Moderates. He resigned from the position after the party's defeat in the October 2002 municipal elections, in which the party received only 4.4% of the total votes nationwide. In early 2004, the Moderates party renamed itself the Estonian Social Democratic Party.

In 2003, Ilves became an observer member of the European Parliament and, on 1 May 2004, a full member. In the 2004 elections to the European Parliament, Ilves was elected MEP in a landslide victory for the Estonian Social Democratic Party. He sat with the Party of European Socialists group in the Parliament. Katrin Saks took over his MEP seat when Ilves became President of Estonia in 2006. In 2011, he was re-elected for a second five-year term.

In 2013, it was announced that Ilves had accepted a position on the Council on CyberSecurity's Advisory Board. In 2015, it was announced that Ilves had agreed to join the group of advisers to the World Bank president Jim Yong Kim.

During his presidency, Ilves has been appointed to serve in several high positions in the field of ICT in the European Union. He served as chairman of the EU Task Force on eHealth from 2011 to 2012 and was chairman of the European Cloud Partnership Steering Board at the invitation of the European Commission from 2012 to 2014. In 2013 he chaired the High-Level Panel on Global Internet Cooperation and Governance Mechanisms convened by ICANN. From 2014 to 2015 Ilves was the co-chair of the advisory panel of the World Bank's World Development Report 2016 "Digital Dividends" and was also the chair of World Economic Forum's Global Agenda Council on Cyber Security beginning in June 2014.

Beginning in 2016, Ilves has been co-chairing The World Economic Forum working group The Global Futures Council on Blockchain Technology. In 2017 he joined Stanford University as a Bernard and Susan Liautaud Visiting Fellow at the Center for International Security and Cooperation in the Freeman Spogli Institute for International Studies. From July 2017, Ilves has been a Distinguished Visiting Fellow at the Hoover Institution, Stanford University.

In 2017, Ilves joined the advisory council of the German Marshall Fund's Alliance for Securing Democracy, a project aimed to map out the Russian influence activities in the USA and the EU.

On 25 September 2020, Ilves was named as one of the 25 members of the "Real Facebook Oversight Board", an independent monitoring group unaffiliated with, but created in response to, the Oversight Board, Facebook Inc.'s content moderation review board.

In 2024, Ilves was the subject of a documentary, Rebel with a Bow Tie (Estonian: Kikilipsuga Mässaja), directed by filmmaker Jaan Tootsen, who was formerly Ilves's cultural advisor during his presidency. The film debuted at the 28th Tallinn Black Nights Film Festival on 15 November 2024.

After almost 20 years as a non-party politician, Ilves has been a Volt Europa party member since April 2025. He explains the change by the increasing threat posed by other countries to Europe and the need for pragmatic reforms in the European Parliament.

== Presidential elections ==
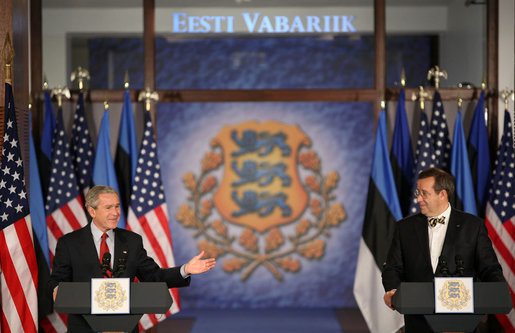
President Toomas Hendrik Ilves and President George W. Bush, in Estonia 2006

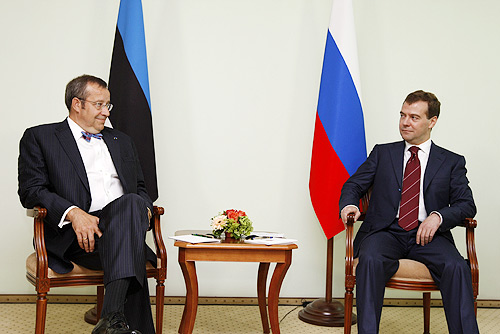
Toomas Hendrik Ilves and Dmitry Medvedev in 2008

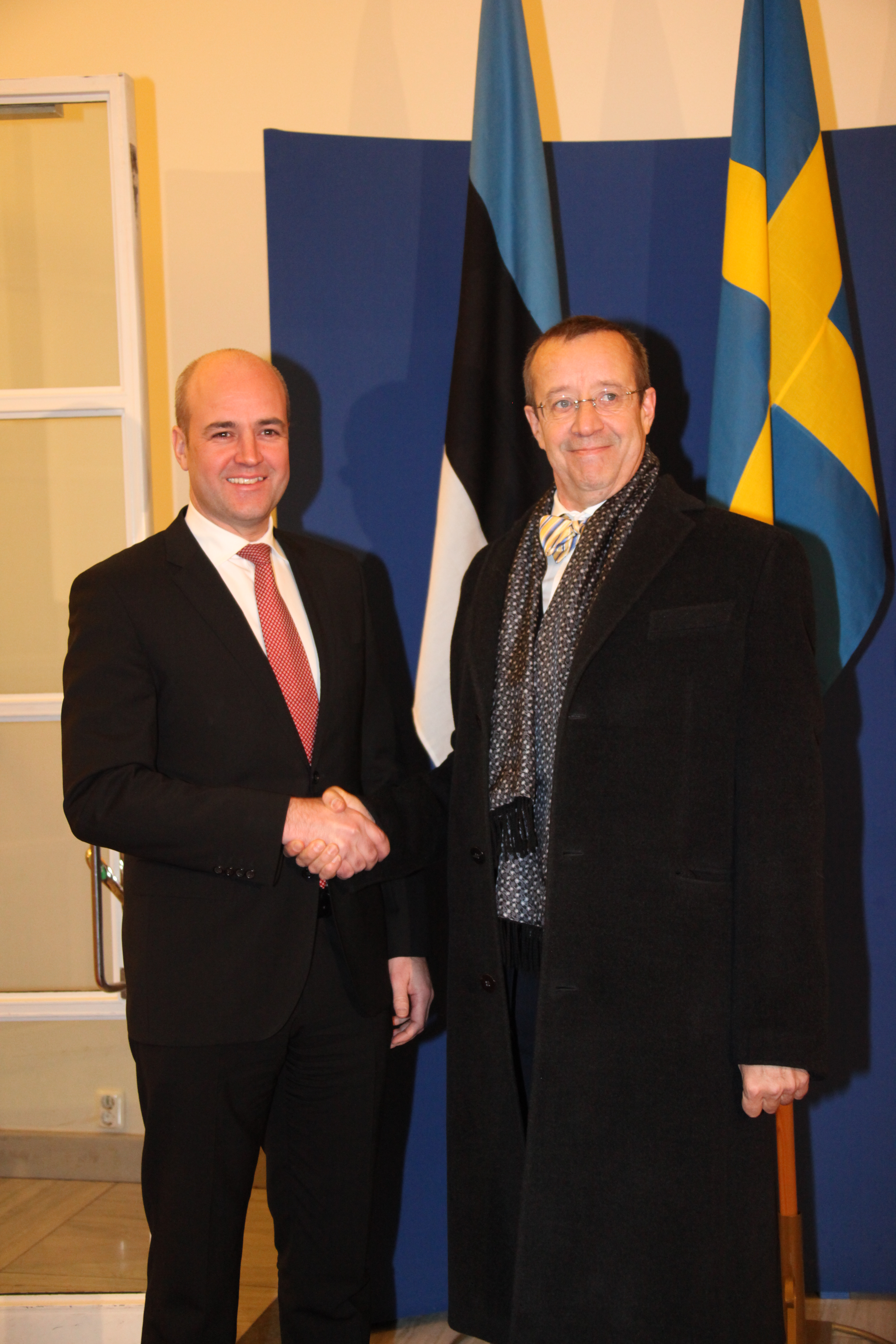
Toomas Hendrik Ilves and Fredrik Reinfeldt in 2011

Ilves was nominated along with Ene Ergma as a candidate for the 2006 Estonian presidential election by four parties: the Reform Party, the Social Democratic Party, the Union of Pro Patria and Res Publica and the Estonian Centre Party that attempted to agree on a joint candidate. Ilves was the only candidate in the second and the third rounds of elections in Riigikogu where he gathered 64 votes of 65 ballots, less than the two-thirds majority of the 101-seat parliament. His candidacy was automatically transferred to the next round in the Electors' Assembly on September 23, 2006.

On September 13, 2006, a group of 80 Estonian cultural figures (including Neeme Järvi, Jaan Kross, Arvo Pärt and Jaan Kaplinski, among others) published a letter in support of Ilves over the incumbent, Arnold Rüütel, in the upcoming presidential election.

On 23 September 2006, he received 174 ballots in the first round of the presidential election in the Electors' Assembly, thereby being elected the next president of Estonia. His five-year term started on 9 October 2006.

On 29 August 2011, he was reelected by the 101-seat legislature to a second five-year term. His opponent was Indrek Tarand. He received support from 73 members of the legislature, and is the first candidate to be elected in the first round since Estonia regained independence in 1991.

== Personal life ==
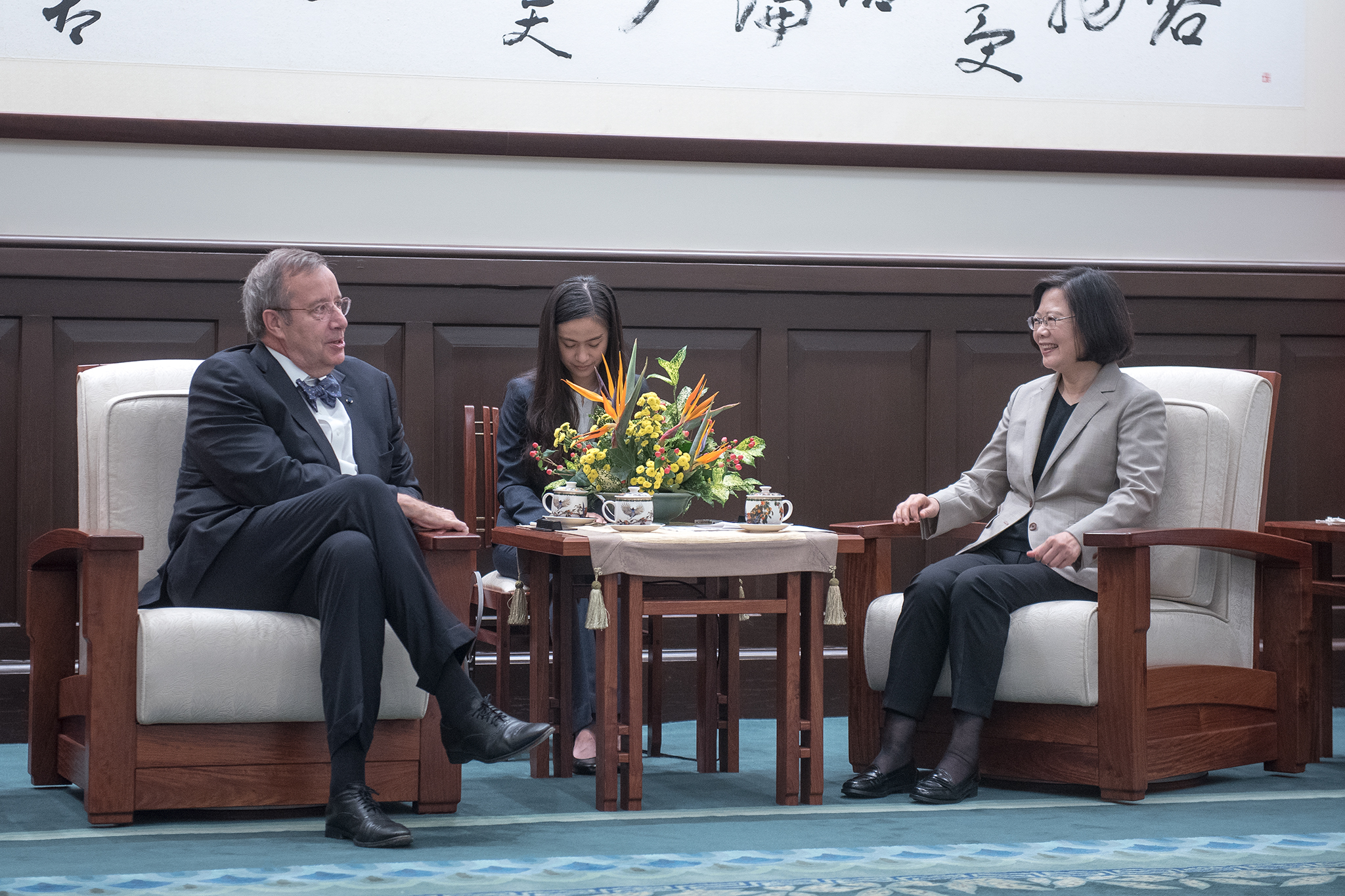
Ilves meets with President of Taiwan Tsai Ing-wen as part of APEC Digital Innovation Forum in 2018.

Ilves has been married three times. With his first wife, American psychologist Merry Bullock, he has two children, Luukas Kristjan (b. 1987) and Juulia Kristiine (b. 1992). In 2004, Ilves married his longtime partner Evelin Int-Lambot, with whom he has one daughter, Kadri Keiu (b. 2003). They divorced in April 2015. In January 2016 he married Ieva Kupče, the head of the Cybersecurity Division in the Defense Ministry of Latvia. They have a son. They divorced in December 2023.

He maintains a Twitter account, personally posting on a regular basis to comment on both current events and his own interests, usually in English.

Ilves has a brother, Andres Ilves, formerly the head of the Afghanistan branch of Radio Free Europe/Radio Liberty (Radio Free Afghanistan and Radio Farda) and the head of Persian and Pashto Service of the BBC.

He is a member of the Estonian Students' Society.

Ilves is also known as an avid music lover and has a varied taste in pop music. In 2015, the Baltic division of Universal Music Group released a compilation album "Teenage Wasteland: T.H. Ilves Favourites 1963-1978", the idea of which can be summarized in Ilves's own words: "Back then my life was saved by rock ‘n’ roll." The album figures the following popular artists: Four Tops, The Temptations, The Shangri-Las, The Beach Boys, Cream, The Band, The Velvet Underground, Roxy Music, The Who, Lesley Gore, New York Dolls, The Troggs, David Bowie, Ramones, Peter Sarstedt, MC5. The proceeds of this album went to the charity project "My Dream Day" that was targeted at chronically ill children receiving treatment at Estonian hospitals. As for Estonian music, in a Radio Kuku interview (reported by Eesti Ekspress in 2009), Ilves expressed interest in such divergent artists as Arvo Pärt, Liisi Koikson, Vaiko Eplik, Sinine, Jaak Tuksam. At official presidential receptions, there have been performances by Vennaskond, Eliit, Köök, Hedvig Hanson, Metsatöll, Röövel Ööbik, Def Räädu, Chalice.

== Honours ==
=== National honours ===
- Estonia: Collar of the Order of the Cross of Terra Mariana (2006)
- Estonia: Collar of the Order of the National Coat of Arms, also known as the Presidential Chain (2008)
- Estonia: Third Class of the Order of the National Coat of Arms (2004)

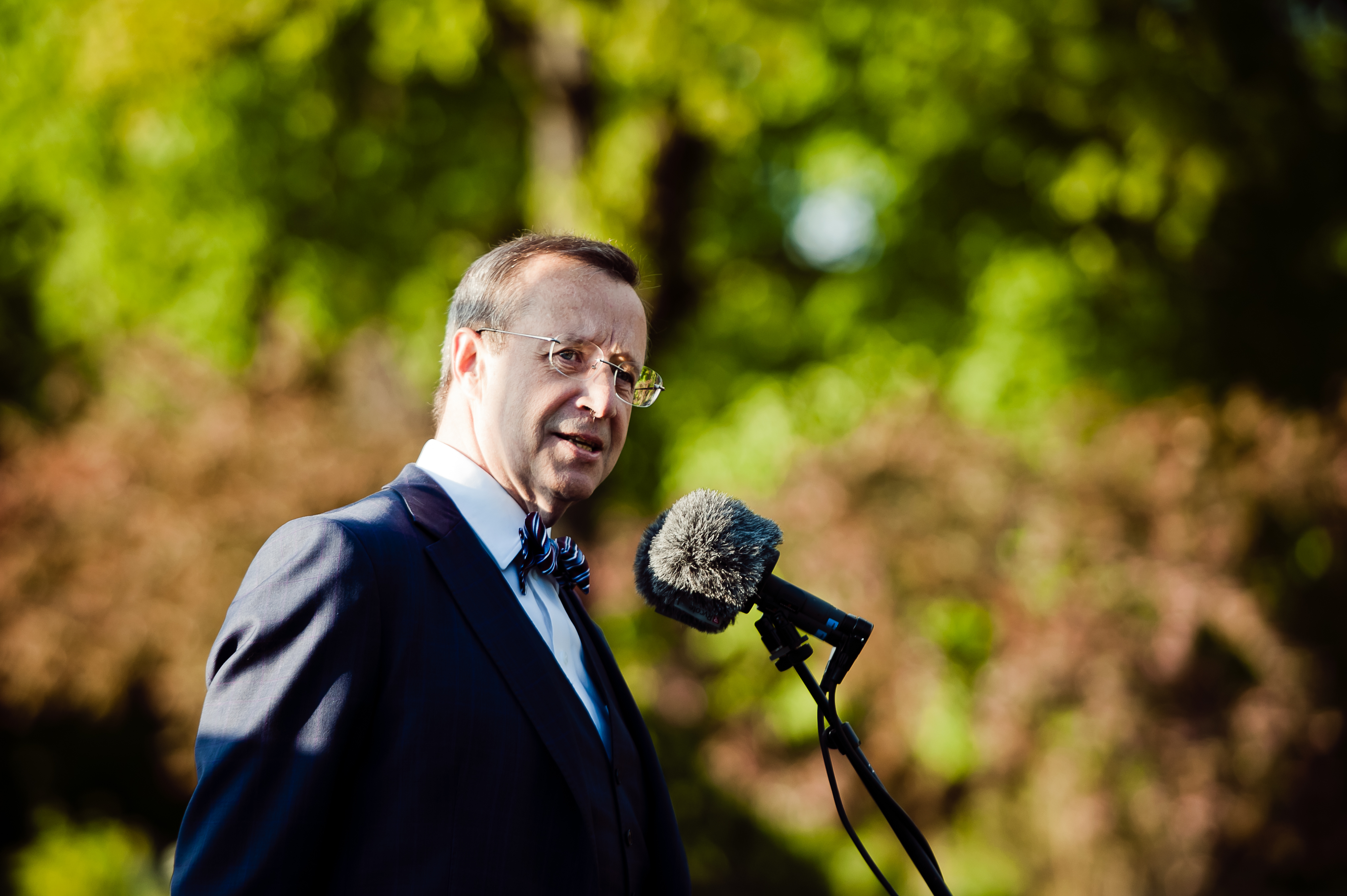
Toomas Hendrik Ilves in 2012

=== Foreign honours ===
Arms as knight of the Royal Order of the Seraphim

- Belgium: Grand Cordon of the Order of Leopold (2008)
- Finland: Grand Cross with Collar of the Order of the White Rose of Finland (2007)
- France: Commander of the National Order of Legion of Honour (2001)
- Greece: Grand Cross of the Order of Honour (1999)
- Georgia:
  - Recipient of the St. George's Order of Victory (2010)
  - Recipient of the Order of the Golden Fleece (2007)
- Hungary: Grand Cross with Chain of the Order of Merit of the Republic of Hungary (2009)
- Iceland: Grand Cross with Collar of the Order of the Falcon (2010)
- Japan: Grand Cordon of the Supreme Order of the Chrysanthemum (2007)
- Kazakhstan: First Class of the Order of Friendship (2011)
- Latvia:
  - Commander Grand Cross with Chain of the Order of the Three Stars (2009)
  - Grand Cross of the Cross of Recognition (2012)
  - Commander of the Order of the Three Stars (2004)
- Lithuania: Grand Cross with Golden Chain of the Order of Vytautas the Great (2008)
- Malta: Honorary Companion of Honour with Collar of the National Order of Merit (2012)
- Netherlands: Knight Grand Cross of the Order of the Netherlands Lion (2008)
- Norway:
  - Grand Cross of the Royal Norwegian Order of St. Olav (2014)
  - Knight 1st Class of the Royal Norwegian Order of Merit (1999)
- Poland: Knight of the Order of the White Eagle (2014)
- Romania: Collar of the Order of the Star of Romania (2011)
- Slovakia: Grand Cross of the Order of the White Double Cross (2015)
- Spain: Collar of the Order of Isabella the Catholic (2007)
- Sweden: Knight of the Royal Order of the Seraphim (2011)
- United Kingdom: Honorary Knight Grand Cross of the Order of the Bath (2006)

== International awards and honorary degrees ==
- 2013 NDI Democracy Award by the National Democratic Institute
- 2014 Freedom Award by the Atlantic Council
- 2015 Aspen Prague Award by the Aspen Institute
- 2016 Knight of Freedom Award by The Casimir Pulaski Foundation
- 2016 John Jay Award by Columbia College, Columbia University
- 2017 Reinhard Mohn Prize by the Bertelsmann Stiftung
- 2017 World Leader in Cybersecurity Award by the Boston Global Forum
- 2007 Honorary Doctorate of the Tbilisi State University, Georgia
- 2010 Honorary Doctorate of the John Paul II Catholic University of Lublin, Poland
- 2014 Doctor of Letters honoris causa of the St. Olaf College, United States of America

Diplomatic posts
New office	Ambassador to the United States; 1993–1996	Succeeded by Kalev Stoicescu
Political offices
Preceded by Siim Kallas	Minister of Foreign Affairs; 1996–1998	Succeeded by Raul Mälk
Preceded by Raul Mälk	Minister of Foreign Affairs; 1999–2002	Succeeded by Kristiina Ojuland
Preceded by Arnold Rüütel	President of Estonia; 2006–2016	Succeeded by Kersti Kaljulaid
