= Olev Olesk =

Estonian politician (1921–2017)

Olev Olesk (4 March 1921 – 18 May 2017) was a former Estonian politician. He served as the last Estonian Minister of Foreign Affairs in exile, between 1990 and 1992.

Olev Olesk was born in the village of Sooküla, Peri Parish, Võru County (now part of the village of Rosma, Põlva Parish, in Põlva County). From 1942 to 1944, during the German occupation, he studied at the University of Tartu's Faculty of Law, and he was also a member of the Estonian Students' Society.

On 22 September 1944, he escaped to Sweden from Salumetsa Talu on Paatsalu on Priidik Jungermann's ship Minnalaid together with 202 other refugees.

From 1956, he lived in New York City, United States. Olesk died in New York on 18 May 2017 at the age of 96.

Political offices
Preceded by Elmar Lipping	Estonian Minister of Foreign Affairs in exile 1990–1992	Succeeded by Lennart Meri (not in exile)
