= Andres Ilves =

Estonian-American journalist

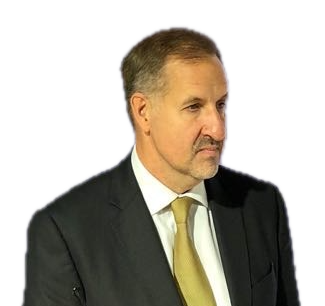
Andres Ilves

Andres Ilves (also known as Andy Ilves, born Andres Erik Ilves) is a journalist and writer, currently Director, Near East and Eastern Europe at Radio Free Europe/Radio Liberty. Previously he worked for over a decade at the BBC, where he headed the Somali Service at BBC Africa, and prior to that as head of the Persian and Pashto Service of the BBC World Service, where he was responsible for BBC radio and online output in the languages of Afghanistan, Iran, Tajikistan, and the border areas of Pakistan. At the BBC he also served as Head of Development, Global News Marketing Communications & Audiences. He was also based in Nairobi, Kenya as the country director for Kenya and Somalia for BBC Media Action, where he oversaw a weekly Swahili-language Question Time-style television program and launched a ground-breaking radio drama for Somali youth.

In addition to his positions of editorial and managerial responsibility within the BBC, Ilves speaks and writes about current affairs, appearing on television as well.

Ilves is the editor of "More Light, Less Heat: Who holds power in the global conversation?", a collection of global thought leaders' views on how both the rapid changes in communication—from the internet to mobile phones—and the rise of extreme views have changed our world since the beginning of the 21st century.

Ilves has also been the chair of the board of trustees of Peace Direct, a UK-based charity providing support to peace builders in a dozen conflict zones around the world. His brother is Toomas Hendrik Ilves, who was the 4th President of Estonia.

== Early life and career ==
Ilves was born in New Jersey, United States, to Estonian refugee parents. He graduated with honours from Princeton University, with a degree in Near Eastern Studies.

After Princeton, Ilves spent a year as a Coro Foundation Fellow in Los Angeles, and then as a Rotary Scholar at the Universiteit van Amsterdam, in The Netherlands. Ilves then worked for Radio Free Europe/Radio Liberty in Munich, Germany as a journalist, analyst, and translator focusing on Afghanistan, as well as on ethnic and linguistic minority issues around the world.

Ilves also spent time in California as a legislative and media aide to Los Angeles City Councilman Richard Alatorre and San Francisco Supervisor Terence Hallinan. Following Hallinan's election as San Francisco district attorney, Ilves served as his chief of administration.

After time spent working on an election monitoring and political party capacity building project in Serbia for the National Democratic Institute for International Affairs (NDI), Ilves served more than three years as the executive director of the Names Project Foundation, the sponsor of the AIDS Memorial Quilt.

== Media experience ==
Following the attacks on the World Trade Center and the Pentagon on 11 September 2001, Ilves returned to his previous specialty of Afghanistan, becoming the first director of the newly established Radio Free Afghanistan, based in Prague, Czech Republic. In 2003, he was appointed by the US Broadcasting Board of Governors to oversee US international broadcasting to Iran as well, as the first director of Radio Farda.

In November 2004, Ilves was appointed Head of the BBC World Service's output in the Persian, Pashto, Dari, and Tajik languages. He also played an integral role in setting up the new BBC Persian-language television channel, which launched in January 2009.

== Miscellaneous ==
Ilves is a passionate linguist, speaking numerous languages besides his native Estonian and English, including Dutch, Esperanto, French, German, Swahili, Zulu, Pashto, Persian, and Portuguese. He has been studying isiZulu for several years now, including at the University of London's School of Oriental and African Studies (SOAS). Ilves listens primarily to kwaito and hip hop music; his favourite music stations are Johannesburg's youth station YFM and BBC Radio 1Xtra. He lives in London but travels frequently to Africa as well as Afghanistan and the surrounding region for work. Ilves feels particularly strong ties to the township of Soweto in South Africa.
