= Saint George =

Christian saint and martyr (died 303)

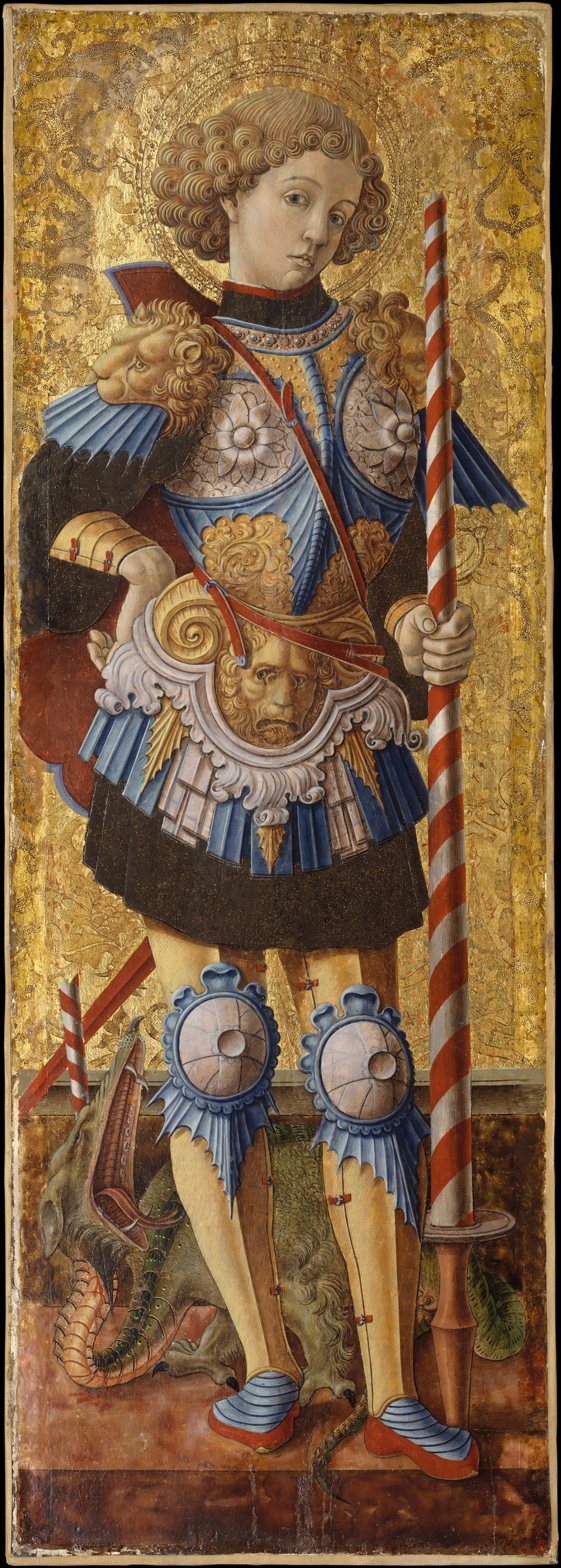
- Saint George by Carlo Crivelli, c. 1472

Megalomartyr, Wonderworker Trophy-Bearer, Victory-Bearer
- Born: 3rd century Cappadocia, Anatolia, Roman Empire
- Died: 23 April 303; Diospolis (Lydda), Syria Palaestina, Roman Empire
- Venerated in: Eastern Orthodox Church; Catholic Church; Oriental Orthodoxy; Church of the East; Anglican Communion; Lutheranism; Umbanda; Druze faith; Islam; Santeria
- Major shrine: Church of Saint George, Lalibela; Cathedral of Saint George, Damascus; Church of Saint George and Mosque of Al-Khadr; Church of St. George (Cairo); St. George Cathedral, Timișoara; St. George's Monastery, Al-Khader; St. George Orthodox Church Puthuppally Pally; St. George Syro-Malabar Catholic Forane Church, Edappally; St. George's Syro-Malabar Catholic Forane Church, Aruvithura; St. George Forane Church, Edathua; St. George's Cathedral, Addis Ababa; St George's Chapel, Windsor Castle
- Feast: 23 April (Saint George's Day); 6 May (Gregorian when Julian date is observed); 23 Parmouti (Coptic calendar, 1 May); Saturday before third Sunday of Exaltation of the Cross (Armenian Church calendar)
- Attributes: Clothed as a crusader in plate armour or mail, often bearing a lance tipped by a cross, riding a white horse, often slaying a dragon. In the Greek East and Latin West he is shown with St George's Cross emblazoned on his armour, or shield or banner.
- Patronage: Patronage list

Saint George (Greek: Γεώργιος, romanized: Geṓrgios; (Note: Geʽez: ጊዮርጊስ, Latin: Geōrgius, Georgian: გიორგი, Hebrew: גאורגיוס, romanized: Ge'orgiyos, Syriac: ܡܪܝ ܓܘܪܓܝܣ, romanized: Mar Giwargis, Arabic: جرجس, romanized: Jirjis) died 23 April 303), also George of Lydda, was an early Christian martyr who is venerated as a saint in Christianity. According to holy tradition, he was a soldier in the Roman army. Of Cappadocian Greek origin, he became a member of the Praetorian Guard for Roman emperor Diocletian. During the Diocletianic Persecution, he was sentenced to death for refusing to recant his Christian faith. He became one of the most venerated saints, heroes, and megalomartyrs in Christianity. Since the Crusades, he has been venerated especially as a military saint. He is respected by Christians, Druze, as well as some Muslims as a martyr of monotheistic faith.

In hagiography, he is immortalised in the legend of Saint George and the Dragon and as one of the most prominent military saints. In Roman Catholicism, he is also venerated as one of the Fourteen Holy Helpers. His feast day, Saint George's Day, is traditionally celebrated on 23 April. Historically, the countries of Portugal, England, Bosnia and Herzegovina, Bulgaria, Georgia, Ukraine, Malta, Ethiopia, Catalonia and Aragon, and the cities of Genoa, Moscow and Beirut have claimed George as their patron saint, as have several other regions, cities, universities, professions, and organizations. The Church of Saint George in Lydda, now Lod in Israel, has a sarcophagus traditionally believed to contain St. George's relics.

== History ==
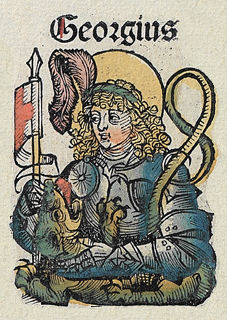
George depicted in the Nuremberg Chronicle of 1493

The English historian Edward Gibbon (1737 – 1794) argued that George, or at least the legend from which the above is distilled, is based on George of Cappadocia, a notorious 4th-century Arian bishop who was Athanasius of Alexandria's most bitter rival, and that it was he who in time became George of England. This identification is seen as highly improbable. Bishop George was slain by Gentile Greeks for exacting onerous taxes, especially inheritance taxes. J. B. Bury, who edited the 1906 edition of Gibbon's The Decline and Fall of the Roman Empire, wrote "this theory of Gibbon's has nothing to be said for it". He adds that "the connection of St. George with a dragon-slaying legend does not relegate him to the region of the myth". Saint George in all likelihood was martyred before the year 290.

== Legend ==
=== Christian traditions ===
Very little is known about George's life. It is thought that he was a Roman military officer of Cappadocian Greek descent, who was martyred under Roman emperor Diocletian in one of the pre-Constantinian persecutions of the 3rd or early 4th century. Beyond this, early sources give conflicting information.

Before the Aswan Dam was flooded, excavations were carried out in Qasr Ibrim in Nubia. In 1964, a Coptic manuscript was discovered under a column in the ruins of the cathedral of Qasr Ibrim. This manuscript is dated between 350 and 500 and represents the oldest tradition of the legend of St George. According to this text, St George's father Gerontius was from Cappadocia and was in the service of the Roman Empire in Nobatia. His wife Polychronia was a Christian. George is said to have been born during the reign of Aurelian, i.e. between 270 and 275. Polychronia raised George as a Christian and had him baptised in secret, as Gerontius disapproved of this as he was a pagan.

Herbert Thurston in The Catholic Encyclopedia states that, based upon an ancient cultus, narratives of the early pilgrims, and the early dedications of churches to George, going back to the fourth century, "there seems, therefore, no ground for doubting the historical existence of St. George", although no faith can be placed in either the details of his history or his alleged exploits.

The Diocletianic Persecution of 303, associated with military saints because the persecution was aimed at Christians among the professional soldiers of the Roman army, is of undisputed historicity. According to Donald Attwater,

No historical particulars of his life have survived, ... The widespread veneration for St George as a soldier saint from early times had its centre in Palestine at Diospolis, now Lydda. St George was apparently martyred there, at the end of the third or the beginning of the fourth century; that is all that can be reasonably surmised about him.

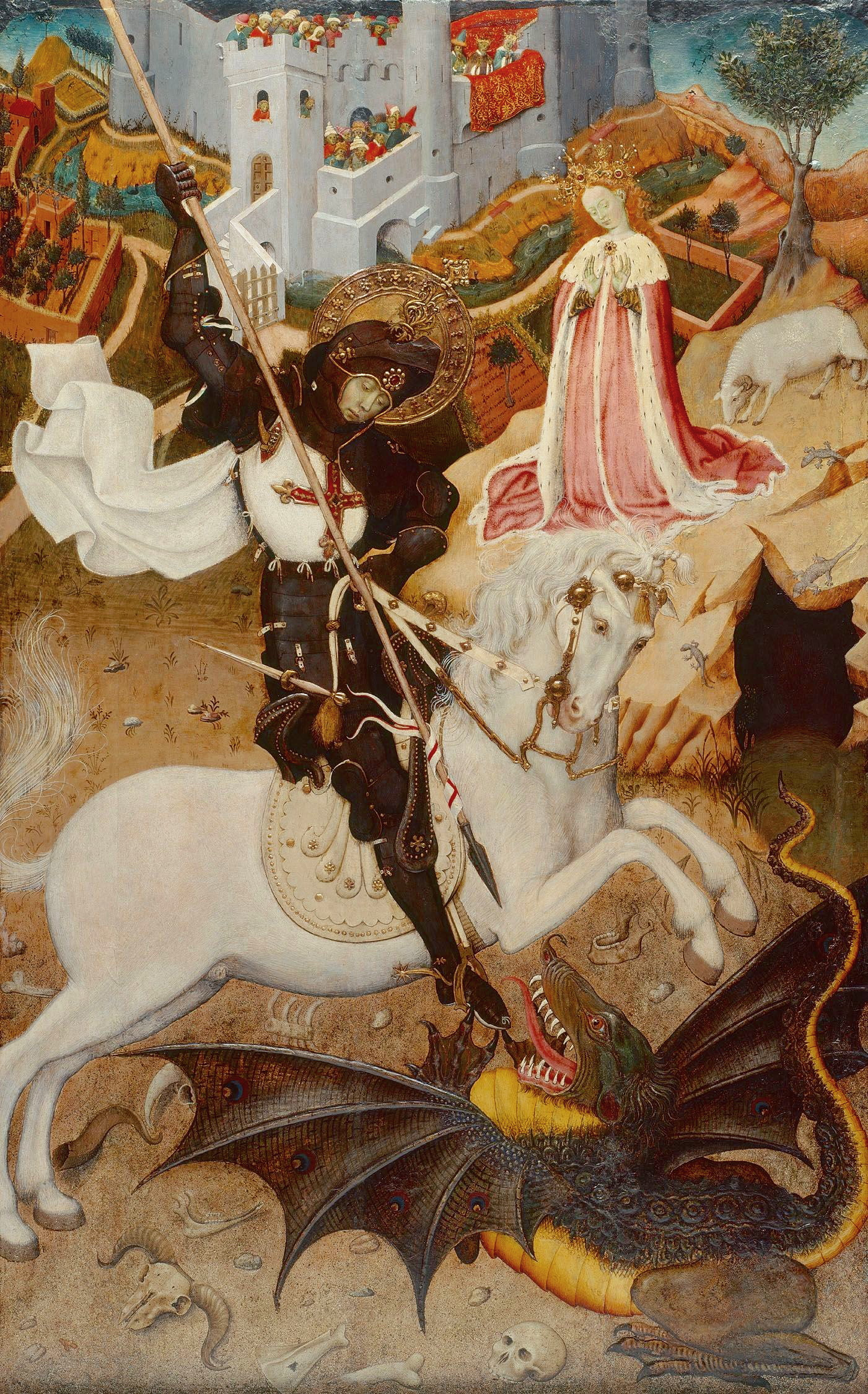
Saint George and the Dragon, 1434/35, by Bernat Martorell, commissioned by the Generalitat of Catalonia

The saint's veneration dates to the 5th century with some certainty, and possibly even to the 4th, while the collection of his intercessory miracles gradually began during the medieval times. The story of the defeat of the dragon is not part of Saint George's earliest hagiographies, and seems to have been a later addition.

The earliest text which preserves fragments of George's narrative is in a Greek hagiography which is identified by Hippolyte Delehaye of the scholarly Bollandists to be a palimpsest of the 5th century. An earlier work by Eusebius, Church History, written in the 4th century, contributed to the legend but did not name George or provide significant detail. The work of the Bollandists Daniel Papebroch, Jean Bolland, and Godfrey Henschen in the 17th century was one of the first pieces of scholarly research to establish the saint's historicity, via their publications in Bibliotheca Hagiographica Graeca. Pope Gelasius I stated in 494 that George was among those saints "whose names are justly reverenced among men, but whose actions are known only to God".

The most complete version, based upon the 5th-century Greek text but in a later form, survives in a translation into Syriac from around 600. Text fragments preserved in the British Library enabled an English translation in 1925.

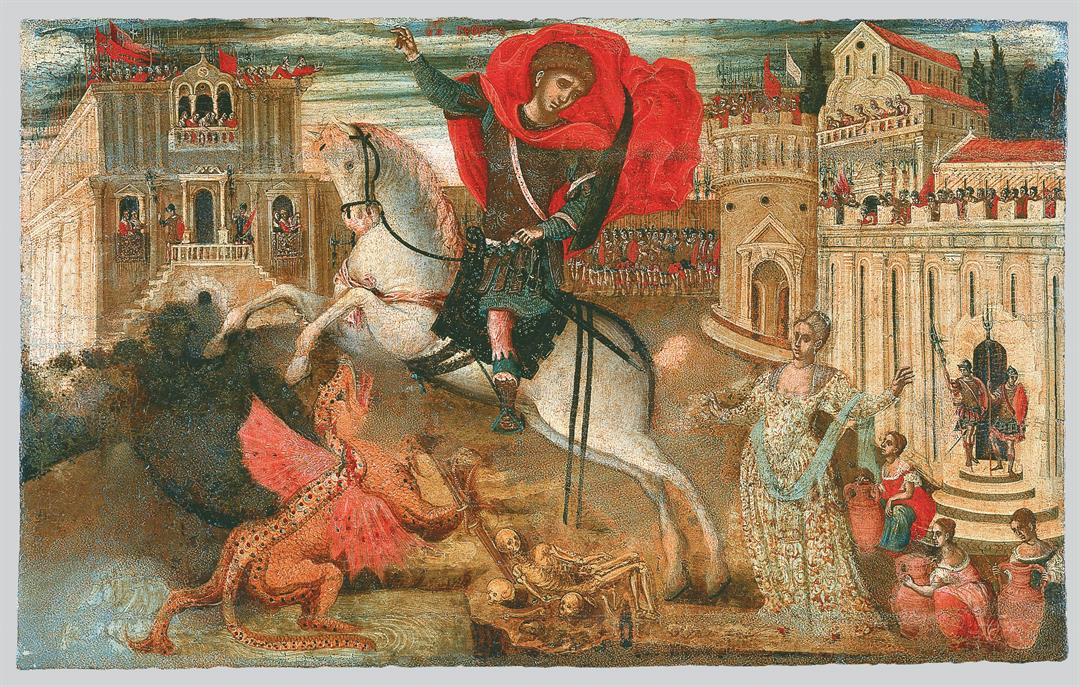
Saint George the Dragon-Slayer, 16th century, by Georgios Klontzas

In the Greek tradition, George was born to noble Christian parents, in Cappadocia, Greater Syria. After his father died, his mother, who was from Lydda, in Syria-Palaestina, Greater Syria, returned with George to her hometown. He went on to become a soldier in the Roman army; but, because of his Christian faith, he was arrested and tortured, "at or near Lydda, also called Diospolis"; on the following day, he was paraded and then beheaded, and his body was buried in Lydda. According to other sources, after his mother's death, George travelled to the eastern imperial capital, Nicomedia, where he was persecuted by one Dadianus. In later versions of the Greek legend, this name is rationalised to Diocletian, and George's martyrdom is placed in the Diocletian persecution of AD 303. The setting in Nicomedia is also secondary, and inconsistent with the earliest cults of the saint being located in Diospolis.

George was executed by decapitation on 23 April 303. A witness of his suffering convinced Empress Alexandra of Rome to become a Christian as well, so she joined George in martyrdom. His body was buried in Diospolis, Palestine where Christians soon came to honour him as a martyr.

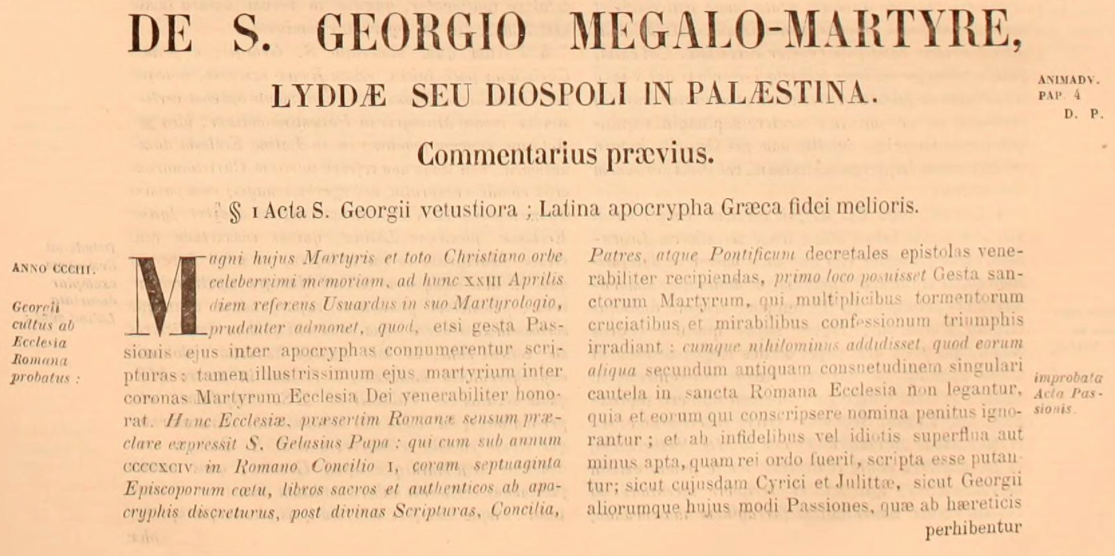
George in the Acta Sanctorum, as collected in late 1600s and early 1700s. The Latin title De S Georgio Megalo-Martyre; Lyddae seu Diospoli in Palaestina translates as St. George Great-Martyr; [from] Lydda or Diospolis, in Palestine

The Latin Passio Sancti Georgii (6th century) follows the general course of the Greek legend, but Diocletian here becomes Dacian, Emperor of the Persians. His martyrdom was greatly extended to more than twenty separate tortures over the course of seven years. Over the course of his martyrdom, 40,900 pagans were converted to Christianity, including the Empress Alexandra. When George finally died, the wicked Dacian was carried away in a whirlwind of fire. In later Latin versions, the persecutor is the Roman emperor Decius, or a Roman judge named Dacian serving under Diocletian.

=== St. George and the Dragon ===
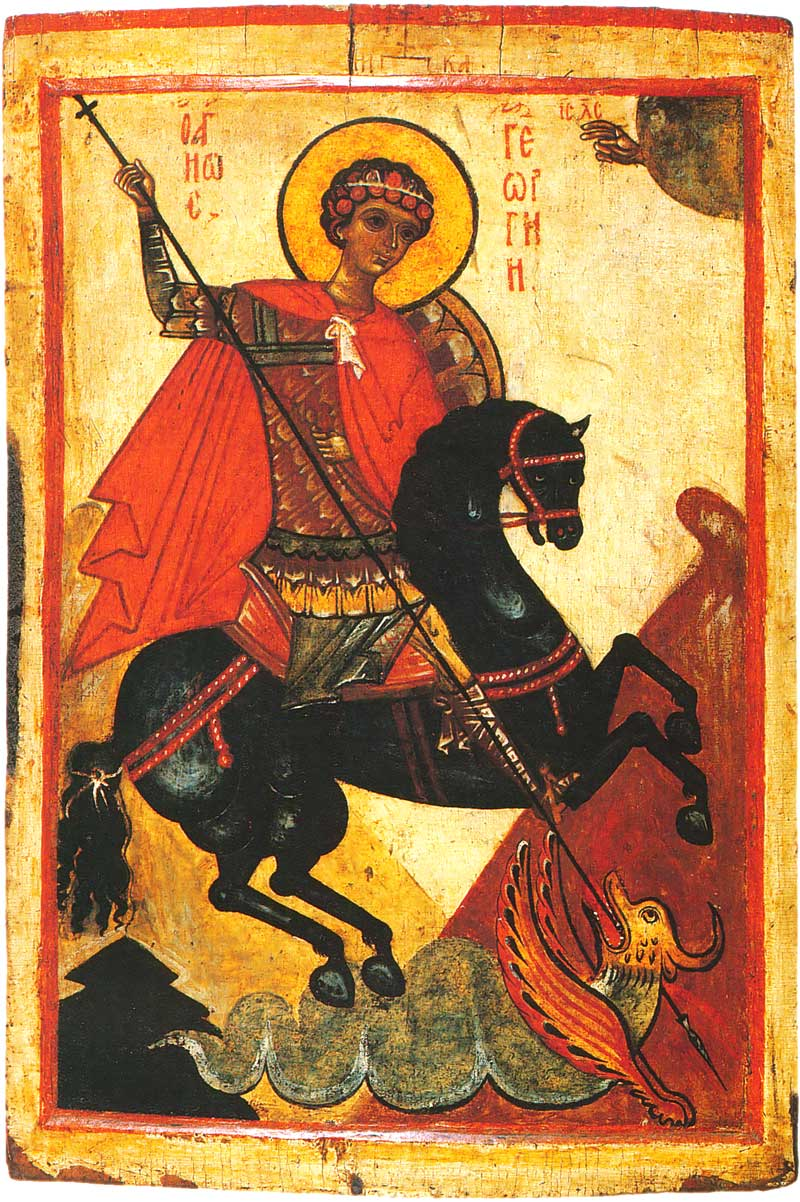
Russian icon (mid-14th century), Novgorod

The earliest known record of the legend of Saint George and the Dragon occurs in the 11th century, in a Georgian source, reaching Latin Europe in the 12th century. In the Golden Legend, by 13th-century Archbishop of Genoa Jacobus de Voragine, George's death was at the hands of Dacian, and around the year 287.

According to tradition, a fierce dragon was causing panic in the city of Silene in Libya when George arrived there. To keep the creature from ravaging the city, the inhabitants gave it two sheep each day, but when the sheep were no longer enough, they were forced to sacrifice people chosen by the townsfolk themselves. Eventually the king's daughter was selected, and no one was willing to take her place. George saved her by slaying the dragon with a lance. The king was so grateful that he offered George treasures as a reward for saving his daughter's life, but George refused and urged him to give them to the poor instead. The townspeople were so astonished by what they witnessed that they all became Christians and were baptised.

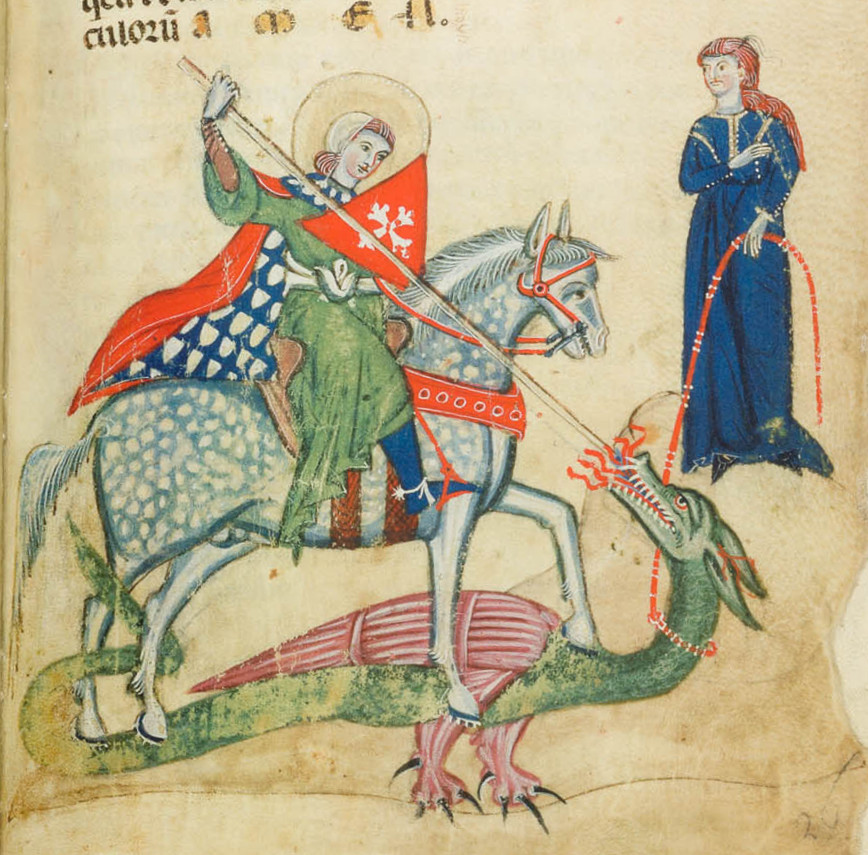
Miniature from a 13th-century Passio Sancti Georgii (Verona)

Saint George's encounter with a dragon, as narrated in the Golden Legend, would go on to become very influential, as it remains the most familiar version in English, owing to William Caxton's 15th-century translation.

In the medieval chivalric romances, the lance with which George slew the dragon was named Ascalon, after the ancient city of the same name in the southern Levant. The name Ascalon was used by Winston Churchill for his personal aircraft during World War II, according to records at Bletchley Park. Iconography of the horseman with a spear overcoming evil was widespread throughout the Christian period.

==== St. George in Greek folklore ====
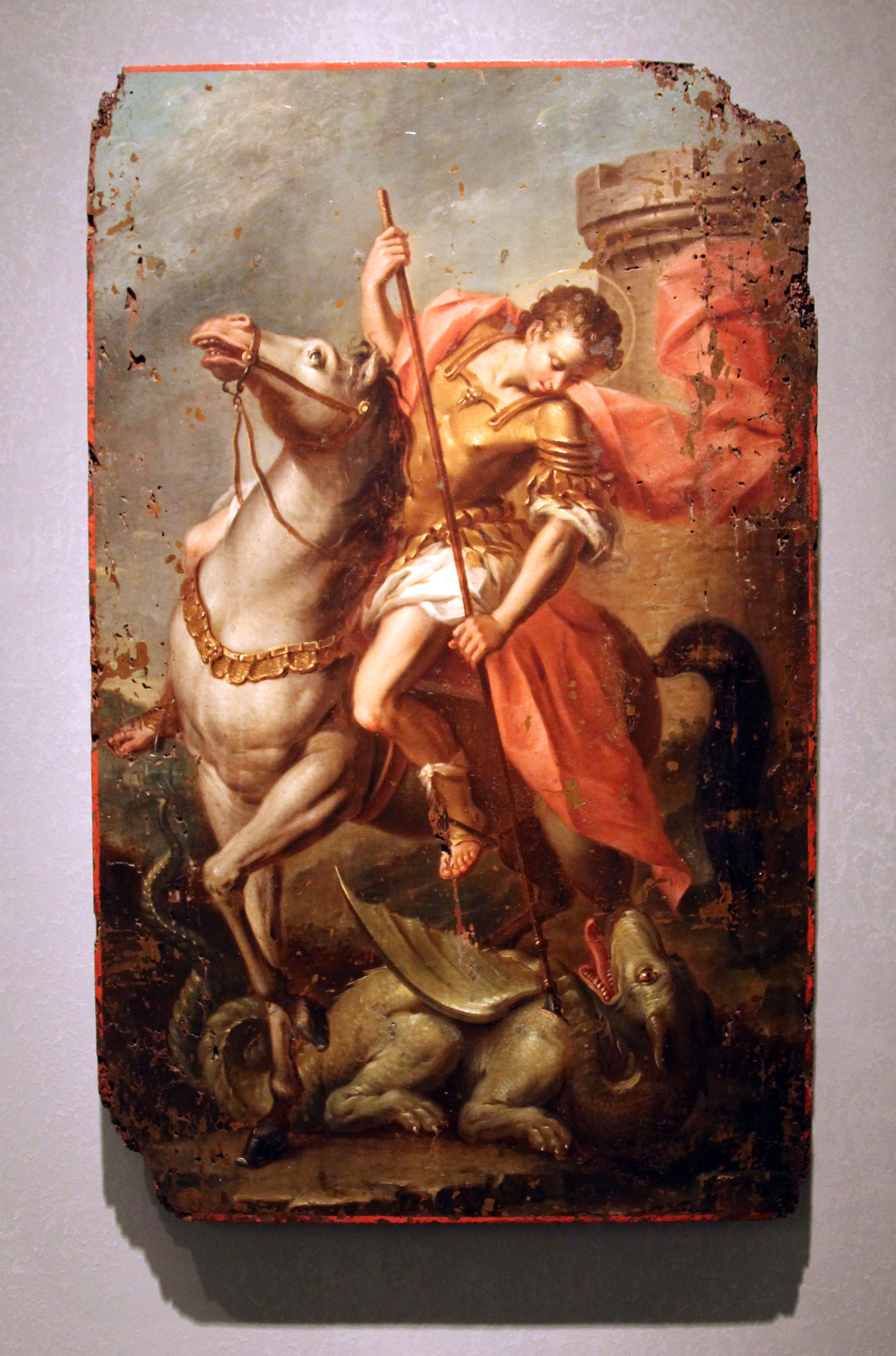
Greek icon (late 18th-early 19th century), painted by Nikolaos Kantounis, Athens, Greece

St. George is considered a folk hero in Greece, with many legends surrounding him. The patron saint of farmers and shepherds. His main feast day in Greece is associated with spring agricultural rituals and festivals, ceremonies of blessing the vines, processions with flowers and green wreaths (e.g. in Thrace) and traditional festivals with dances, litanies of worship of icons and symposia. In the Dodecanese and Crete, he is also known as "St. George the Drunken" (Greek: Άι Γιώργης ο Σποράρης/Μεθυστής), where new wines are blessed, and where afterwards the villagers drink them.

Most Greek legends about Saint George regard his killing of the dragon, however there are a few notable exceptions. For example, in some islands, there are stories of the Saint as a liberator; in particular, a legend states that Saint George freed a young man or woman from Ottoman Turkish kidnappers or pirates. Often, in similar traditions, it is mentioned that pirates attacked Christians who were celebrating during the saint's feast day, however the latter saved the believers from danger.

Saint George is also seen as a protector against vampires and other dangerous supernatural forces in some places in Greece. Specifically, in a village in Argolis, after a series of uncanny events in the 1950s, some locals came to believe that a restless dead person was troubling a Mycenaean chamber tomb near their village. The village priest performed an exorcism on the tomb, which was then re-walled and its entrance was converted into a small shrine dedicated to Saint George. Furthermore, in the Greek island of Mykonos, traveller Joseph Pitton de Tournefort recorded a local folk story in which vampires (vrykolakes) were buried and/or reburied in the Saint George islet nearby.

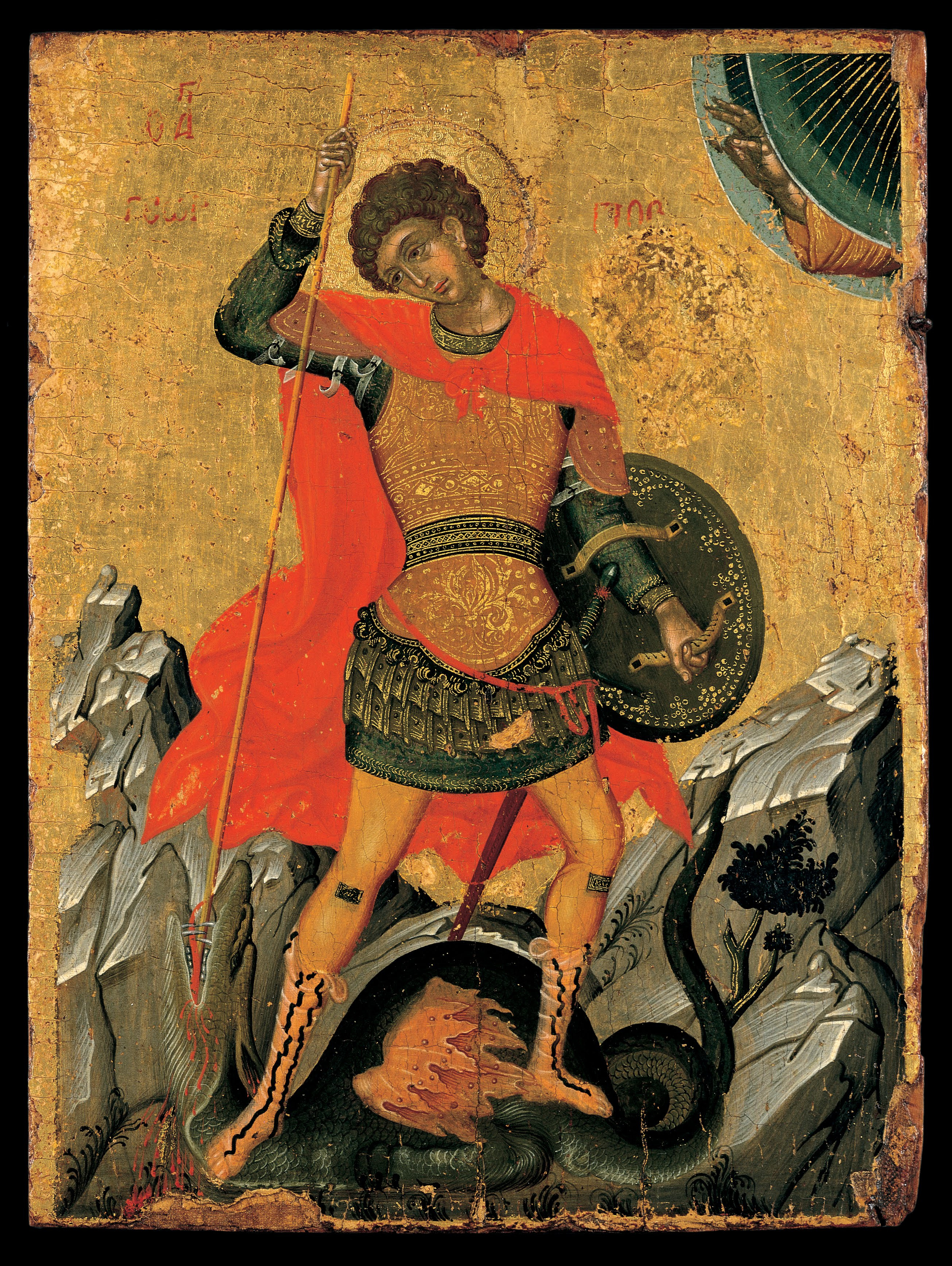
Saint George, Cretan work of the second half of the 15th century, in the tradition of Cretan painter Angelos Akotantos, Benaki Museum, Athens, Greece

Elements of ancient Greek folklore have also survived in the Saint's legends in modern Greek folklore. In particular, similarities between stories of Saint George killing the Dragon and the legends of Apollo killing the giant serpent Python, Heracles killing the serpentine lake monster Lernaean Hydra and Bellerophon killing the monstrous fire-breathing hybrid creature Chimera, have been highlighted.

=== Muslim legends ===
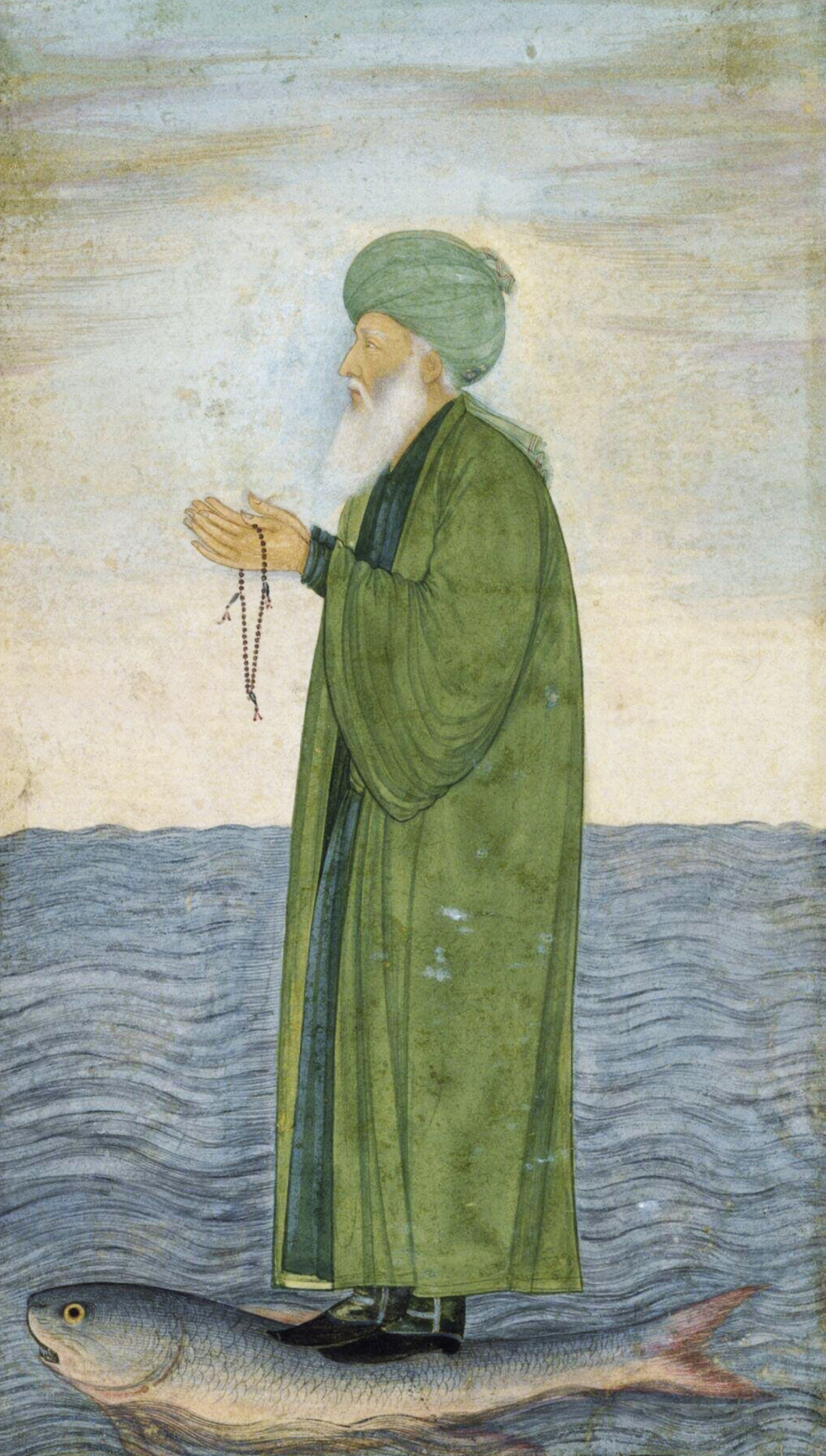
Al-Khidr, the Verdant One, standing on a large fish swimming on the surface of water. The Islamic mid-17th century Mughal painting has a frame with floral and foliated scrolling patterns and has a ground decorated with flowers, with pink lilies and red poppies

George (Arabic: جرجس, Jirjis or Girgus) is included in some Muslim texts as a prophetic figure. The Islamic sources state that he lived among a group of believers who were in direct contact with the last apostles of Jesus. He is described as a rich merchant who opposed the erection of Apollo's statue by Dadan, the king of Mosul. After confronting the king, George was tortured many times to no effect, was imprisoned and was aided by angels. Eventually, he exposed that the idols were possessed by Satan, but was martyred when the city was destroyed by God in a rain of fire.

Muslim scholars have tried to find a historical connection of the saint due to his popularity. According to Muslim legend, he was martyred under the rule of Diocletian and was killed three times but was resurrected every time. The legend is more developed in the Persian version of al-Tabari wherein he resurrects the dead, makes trees sprout and pillars bear flowers. After one of his deaths, the world is covered by darkness which is lifted only when he is resurrected. He is able to convert the queen but she is put to death. He then prays to God to allow him to die, which is granted.

Al-Thaʿlabi states that George was from Palestine and lived in the times of some disciples of Jesus. He was killed many times by the king of Mosul, and resurrected each time. When the king tried to starve him, he touched a piece of dry wood brought by a woman and turned it green, with varieties of fruits and vegetables growing from it. After his fourth death, the city was burnt along with him. Ibn al-Athir's account of one of his deaths is parallel to the apparent crucifixion of Jesus stating, "When he died, God sent stormy winds and thunder and lightning and dark clouds, so that darkness fell between heaven and earth, and people were in great wonderment." The account adds that the darkness was lifted after his resurrection.

== Veneration ==
=== History ===
A titular church built in Diospolis during the reign of Constantine the Great (r. 306–337) was consecrated to "a man of the highest distinction", according to the Church History of Eusebius; the name of the titulus "patron" was not indicated. The Church of Saint George and Mosque of Al-Khadr located in the city is believed to have housed his relics. Nowadays, in the basement of the monastery, pilgrims find the tomb and fragments of saint's relics.

The veneration of George spread from Syria Palaestina through Lebanon to the rest of the Byzantine Empire – though the martyr is not mentioned in the Syriac Breviarium – and the region east of the Black Sea. By the 5th century, the veneration of George had reached the Christian Western Roman Empire, as well: in 494, George was canonised as a saint by Pope Gelasius I, among those "which are known better to God than to human beings."

The early cult of the saint was localised in Diospolis (Greek: City of God), in Syria Palaestina. The first description of Diospolis as a pilgrimage site where George's relics were venerated is De Situ Terrae Sanctae by the archdeacon Theodosius, written between 518 and 530. By the end of the 6th century, the center of his veneration appears to have shifted to Cappadocia. The Life of Saint Theodore of Sykeon, written in the 7th century, mentions the veneration of the relics of the saint in Cappadocia.

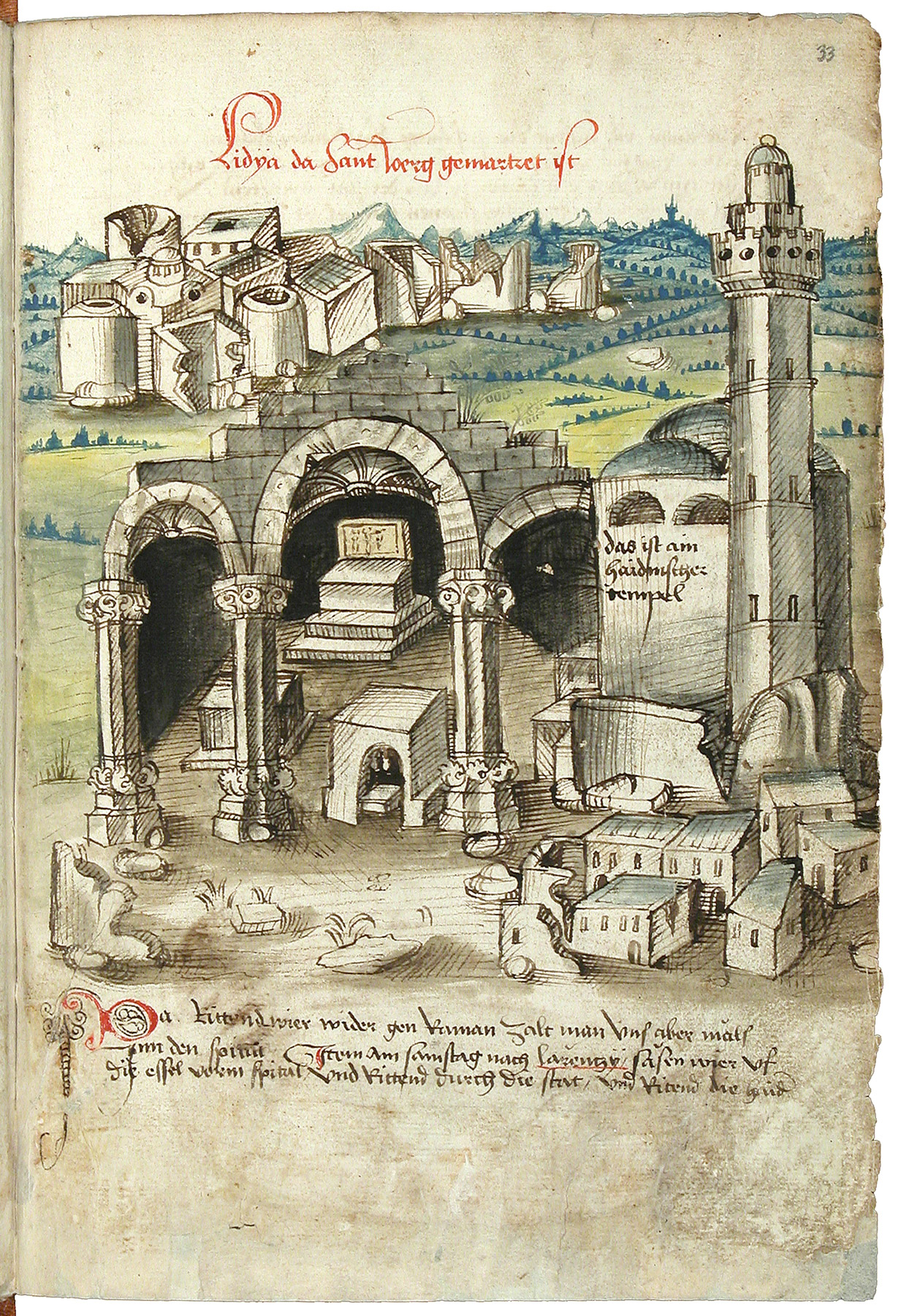
Diospolis with ruined church over the tomb of Saint George and adjacent Mosque of Al-Khadr, Konrad von Grünenberg, 1487

By the time of the early Muslim conquests of the mostly Christian and Zoroastrian Middle East, a basilica in Lydda dedicated to George existed. A new church was erected in 1872 and is still standing, where the feast of the translation of the relics of Saint George to that location is celebrated on 3 November each year. In England, he was mentioned among the martyrs by the 8th-century monk Bede. The Georgslied is an adaptation of his legend in Old High German, composed in the late 9th century. The earliest dedication to the saint in England is a church at Fordington, Dorset, that is mentioned in the will of Alfred the Great. George did not rise to the position of "patron saint" of England, however, until the 14th century, and he was still obscured by Edward the Confessor, the traditional patron saint of England, until in 1552 during the reign of Edward VI all saints' banners other than George's were abolished in the English Reformation.

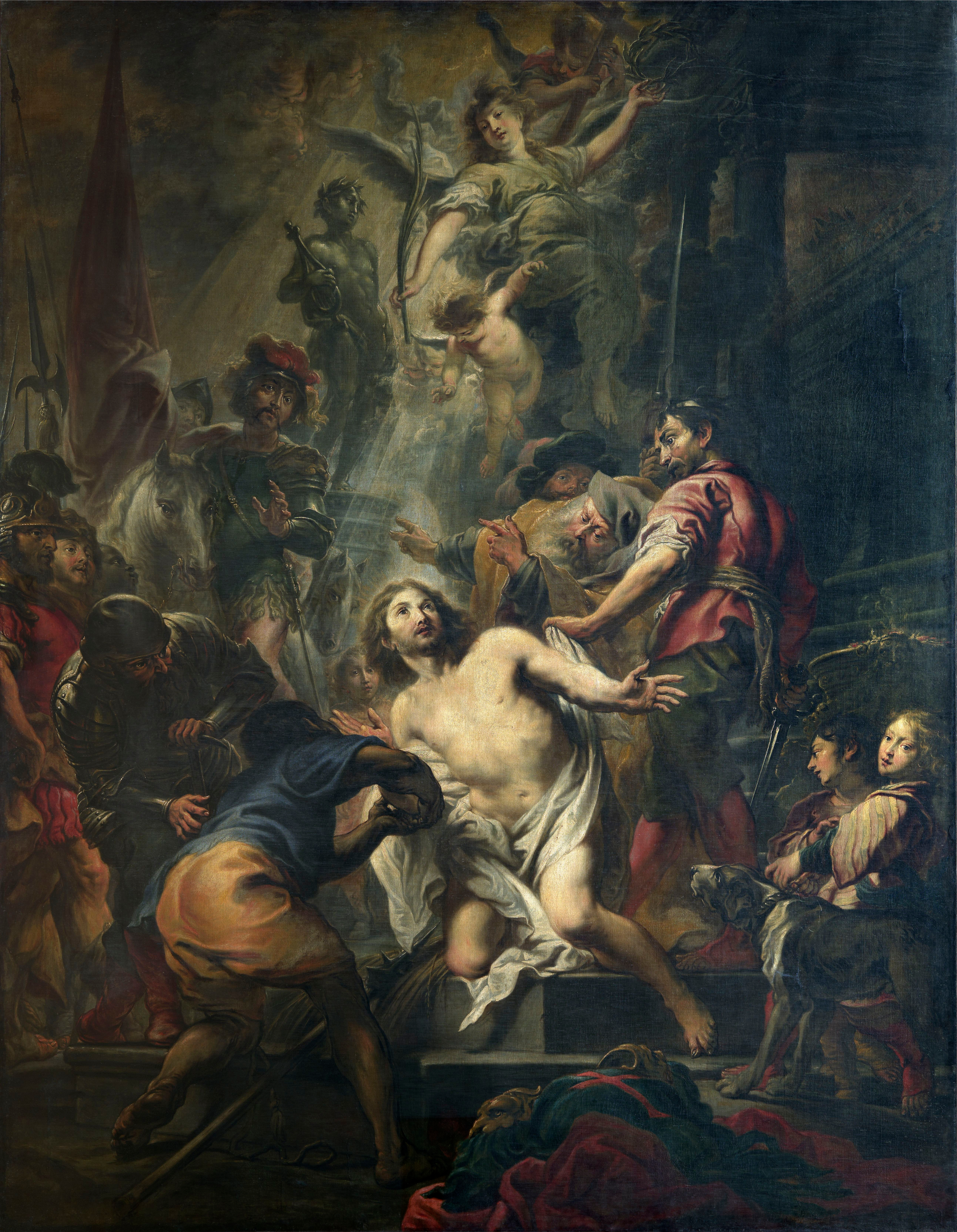
The martyrdom of Saint George, by Cornelis Schut, 1643

Belief in an apparition of George heartened the Franks at the Battle of Antioch in 1098, and a similar appearance occurred the following year at Jerusalem. The chivalric military Order of Sant Jordi d'Alfama was established by king Peter the Catholic from the Crown of Aragon in 1201, Republic of Genoa, Kingdom of Hungary (1326), and by Frederick III, Holy Roman Emperor.

Edward III of England put his Order of the Garter under the banner of George, probably in 1348. The chronicler Jean Froissart observed the English invoking George as a battle cry on several occasions during the Hundred Years' War. In his rise as a national saint, George was aided by the very fact that the saint had no legendary connection with England, and no specifically localised shrine, as that of Thomas Becket at Canterbury: "Consequently, numerous shrines were established during the late fifteenth century," Muriel C. McClendon has written, "and his did not become closely identified with a particular occupation or with the cure of a specific malady."

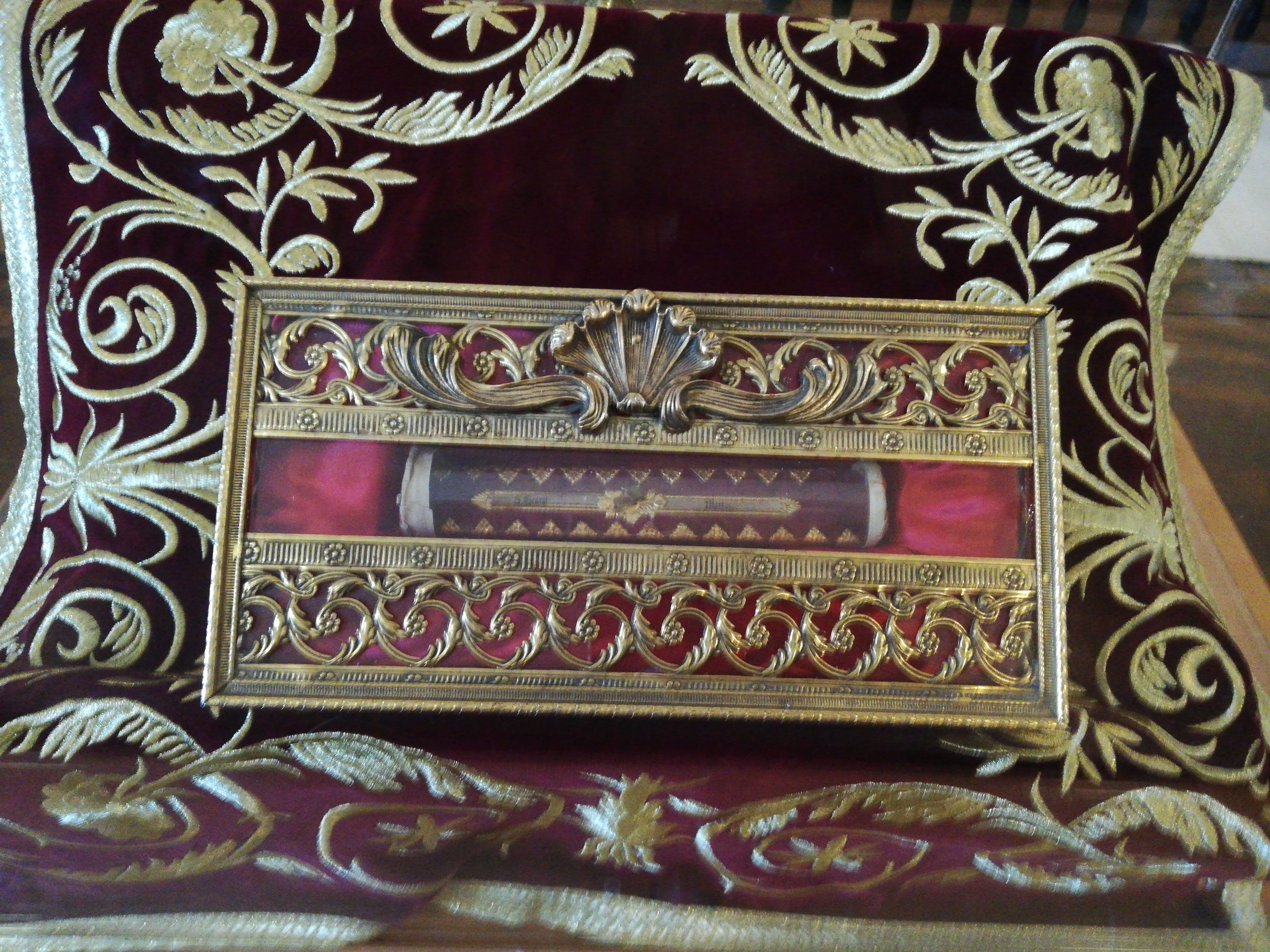
Relics of George at São Jorge parish church, São Jorge, Madeira Island, Portugal

In the wake of the Crusades, George became a model of chivalry in works of literature, including medieval romances. In the 13th century, Jacobus de Voragine, Archbishop of Genoa, compiled the Legenda Sanctorum, (Readings of the Saints) also known as Legenda Aurea (the Golden Legend). Its 177 chapters (182 in some editions) include the story of George, among many others. After the invention of the printing press, the book became a best seller.

The establishment of George as a popular saint and protective giant in the West, that had captured the medieval imagination, was codified by the official elevation of his feast to a festum duplex at a church council in 1415, on the date that had become associated with his martyrdom, 23 April. There was wide latitude from community to community in celebration of the day across late medieval and early modern England, and no uniform "national" celebration elsewhere, a token of the popular and vernacular nature of George's cultus and its local horizons, supported by a local guild or confraternity under George's protection, or the dedication of a local church. When the English Reformation severely curtailed the saints' days in the calendar, Saint George's Day was among the holidays that continued to be observed.

In April 2019, the parish church of São Jorge, in São Jorge, Madeira Island, Portugal, solemnly received the relics of George, patron saint of the parish. During the celebrations the 504th anniversary of its foundation, the relics were brought by the new Bishop of Funchal, D. Nuno Brás.

=== Veneration in the Levant ===
George is renowned throughout the Middle East, as both saint and prophet. His veneration by Christians and Muslims lies in his composite personality combining several biblical, Quranic and other ancient mythical heroes. Saint George is the patron saint of Lebanese Christians, Palestinian Christians and Syrian Christians.

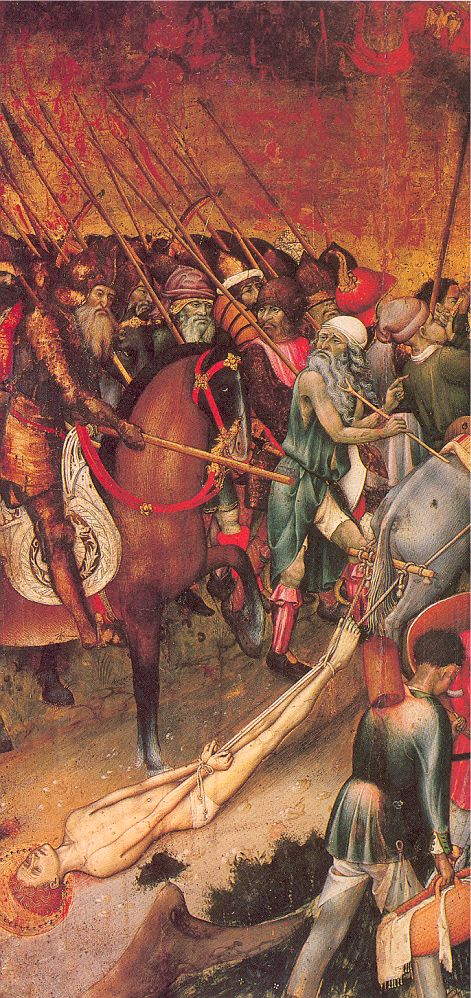
Saint George dragged through the streets (detail), by Bernat Martorell, 15th century

William Dalrymple, who reviewed the literature in 1999, tells us that J. E. Hanauer in his 1907 book Folklore of the Holy Land: Muslim, Christian and Jewish "mentioned a shrine in the village of Beit Jala, beside Bethlehem, Palestine which at the time was frequented by Christians who regarded it as the birthplace of St. George." The site is actually located in a small village directly adjacent to Beit Jala and named Al-Khader, in honour of St. George, and it is St. George's Monastery, Al-Khader.

According to Hanauer, in his day the monastery was "a sort of madhouse. Deranged persons of all the three faiths are taken thither and chained in the court of the chapel, where they are kept for forty days on bread and water, the Eastern Orthodox priest at the head of the establishment now and then reading the Gospel over them, or administering a whipping as the case demands." In the 1920s, according to Tawfiq Canaan's Mohammedan Saints and Sanctuaries in Palestine, nothing seemed to have changed, and all three communities were still visiting the shrine and praying together."

Dalrymple visited the place in 1995. "I asked around in the Christian Quarter in Jerusalem, and discovered that the place was very much alive. With all the greatest shrines in the Christian world to choose from, it seemed that when the local Palestinian Christians had a problem – an illness, or something more complicated – they preferred to seek the intercession of George in his grubby little shrine at Beit Jala rather than praying at the Church of the Holy Sepulchre in Jerusalem or the Church of the Nativity in Bethlehem." Dalrymple's visit was to St. George's Monastery, Al-Khader where Orthodox Christians venerate Saint George and Muslims Al-Khadr. And Dalrymple attests to a certain fusion of these two figures with both Christians and Muslims referring to him Al-Khadr and a Muslim happy to have received a cure from the oil from the lamp burning in front of an icon of Saint George. He asked the priest at the shrine "Do you get many Muslims coming here?" The priest replied, "We get hundreds! Almost as many as the Christian pilgrims. Often, when I come in here, I find Muslims all over the floor, in the aisles, up and down."

The Encyclopædia Britannica from 1911 quoted the Scottish theologian G. A. Smith in his Historic Geography of the Holy Land (1894), assuming: "The Mahommedans who usually identify St. George with the prophet Elijah, at Lydda confound his legend with one about Christ himself. Their name for Antichrist is Dajjal, and they have a tradition that Jesus will slay Antichrist by the gate of Lydda. The notion sprang from an ancient bas-relief of George and the Dragon on the Lydda church. But Dajjal may be derived, by a very common confusion between n and l, from Dagon, whose name two neighbouring villages bear to this day, while one of the gates of Lydda used to be called the Gate of Dagon." The connection of Saint George with a dragon was familiar since the Golden Legend of Jacobus de Voragine and can be traced to the close of the 6th century. At Apollonia–Arsuf or Joppa — neither of them far from Lydda — the mythological hero Perseus had slain the sea-monster that threatened the virgin Andromeda, and George, like many other Christian saints, entered into the inheritance of veneration previously enjoyed by a pagan hero as the French archaeologist Charles Simon Clermont-Ganneau wrote. Apollonia–Arsuf was one of several places where pagan imagination placed the exposure of Andromeda. Clermont-Ganneau derives Arsuf from Reseph, the Phoenician deity whom he identifies with Perseus. The myth travelled to Lydda (al-Lydd), where Perseus became George; and from there, mainly by the influence of the crusaders, Perseus and his dragon walked into the medieval European imagination.

Due to the Christian influence on the Druze faith, two Christian saints have become among the Druze's most venerated figures: Saint George and Saint Elias. Thus, in all the villages inhabited by Druze and Christians in central Mount Lebanon a Christian church or Druze maqam is dedicated to either one of them. According to scholar Ray Jabre Mouawad the Druzes appreciated the two saints for their bravery: Saint George because he confronted the dragon and Saint Elias because he competed with the pagan priests of Baal and won over them. In both cases the explanations provided by Christians is that Druzes were attracted to warrior saints that resemble their own militarised society.

=== Veneration in the Muslim world ===
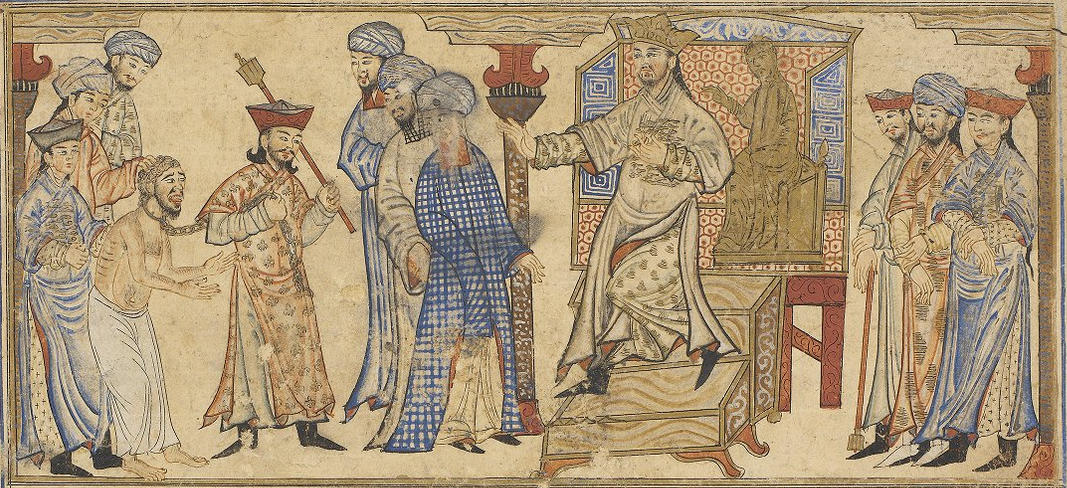
Saint George (Jurjis) miraculously protected when tortured by the King of Mosul for refusing to worship idols. Jami' al-Tawarikh ("World History"), University of Edinburgh Or.Ms.20

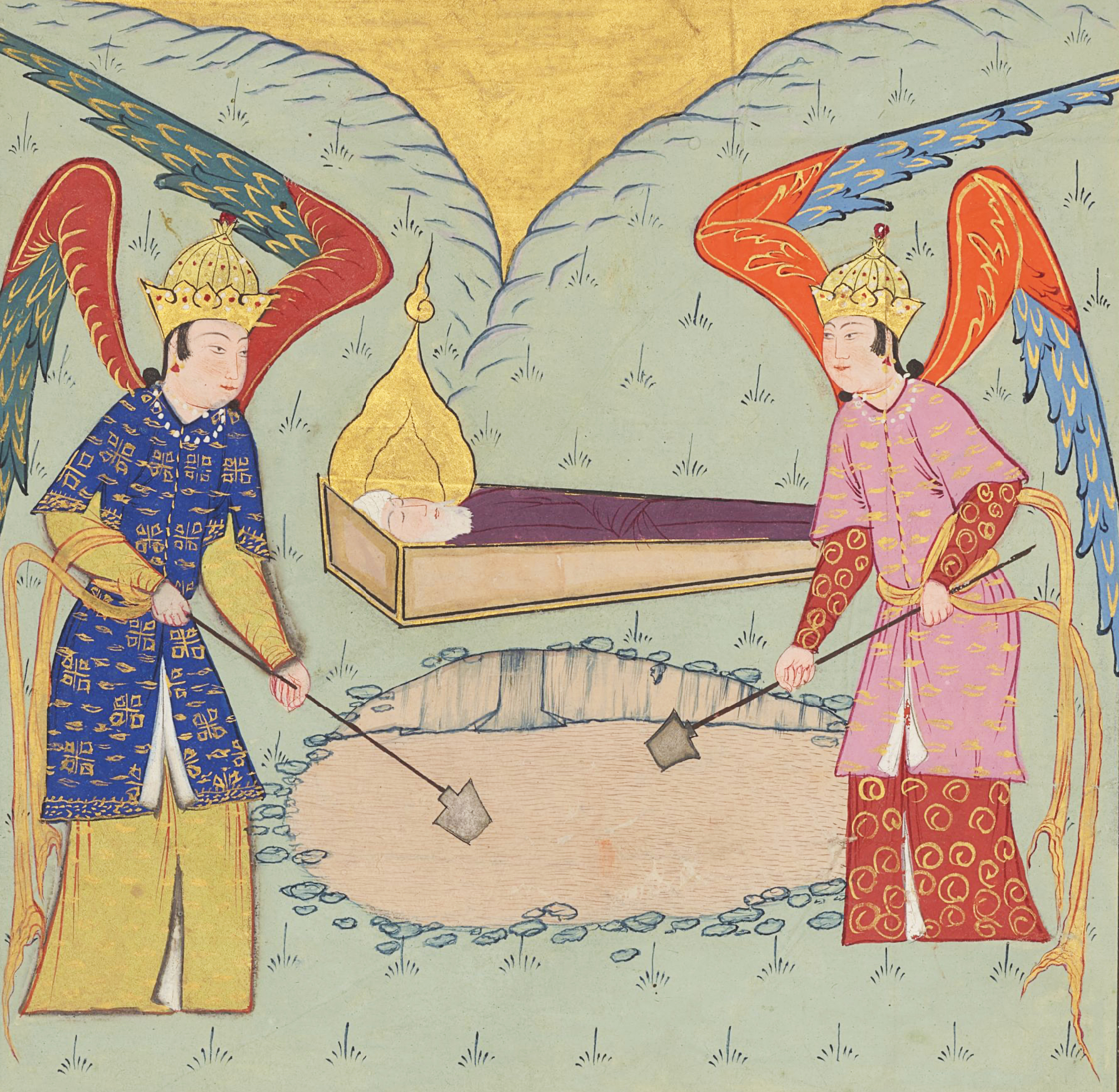
Islamic Persian miniature of Jirjus, emanating the divine light like a prophet or saint, being buried by angels.

George is described as a prophetic figure in Islamic sources. George is venerated by some Christians and Muslims because of his composite personality combining several biblical, Quranic and other ancient mythical heroes. In some sources, he is identified with Elijah or Mar Elis, George or Mar Jirjus and in others as al-Khidr. The last epithet meaning the "verdant prophet", is common to Christian, Muslim, and Druze folk piety. Samuel Curtiss who visited an artificial cave dedicated to him where he is identified with Elijah, reports that childless Muslim women used to visit the shrine to pray for children. Per tradition, he was brought to his place of martyrdom in chains, thus priests of Church of St. George chain the sick especially the mentally ill to a chain for overnight or longer for healing. This is sought after by both Muslims and Christians.

According to Elizabeth Anne Finn's Home in the Holy land (1866):

St George killed the dragon in this country; and the place is shown close to Beyroot. Many churches and convents are named after him. The church at Lydda is dedicated to George; so is a convent near Bethlehem, and another small one just opposite the Jaffa Gate, and others beside. The Arabs believe that George can restore mad people to their senses, and to say a person has been sent to St. George's is equivalent to saying he has been sent to a madhouse. It is singular that the Moslem Arabs adopted this veneration for St George, and send their mad people to be cured by him, as well as the Christians, but they commonly call him El Khudder – The Green Man – according to their favourite manner of using epithets instead of names.

The mosque of Nabi Jurjis, which was restored by Timur in the 14th century, was located in Mosul and supposedly contained the tomb of George. It was destroyed in July 2014 by the occupying Islamic State of Iraq and the Levant, who also destroyed the Mosque of the Prophet Sheeth (Seth) and the Mosque of the Prophet Younis (Jonah). The militants claimed that such mosques have become places for apostasy instead of prayer.

George or Hazrat Jurjays was the patron saint of Mosul. Along with Theodosius, he was revered by both Christian and Muslim communities of Jazira and Anatolia. The wall paintings of Kırk Dam Altı Kilise at Belisırma dedicated to him are dated between 1282 and 1304. These paintings depict him as a mounted knight appearing between donors including a Georgian lady called Thamar and her husband, the Emir and Consul Basil, while the Seljuk Sultan Mesud II and Byzantine Emperor Andronicus II are also named in the inscriptions.

A shrine attributed to prophet George can be found in Diyarbakır, Turkey. Evliya Çelebi states in his Seyahatname that he visited the tombs of prophet Jonah and prophet George in the city.

The reverence for Saint George, who is often identified with Al-Khidr, is deeply integrated into various aspects of Druze culture and religious practices. He is seen as a guardian of the Druze community and a symbol of their enduring faith and resilience. Additionally, Saint George is regarded as a protector and healer in Druze tradition. The story of Saint George slaying the dragon is interpreted allegorically, representing the triumph of good over evil and the protection of the faithful from harm.

=== Feast days ===
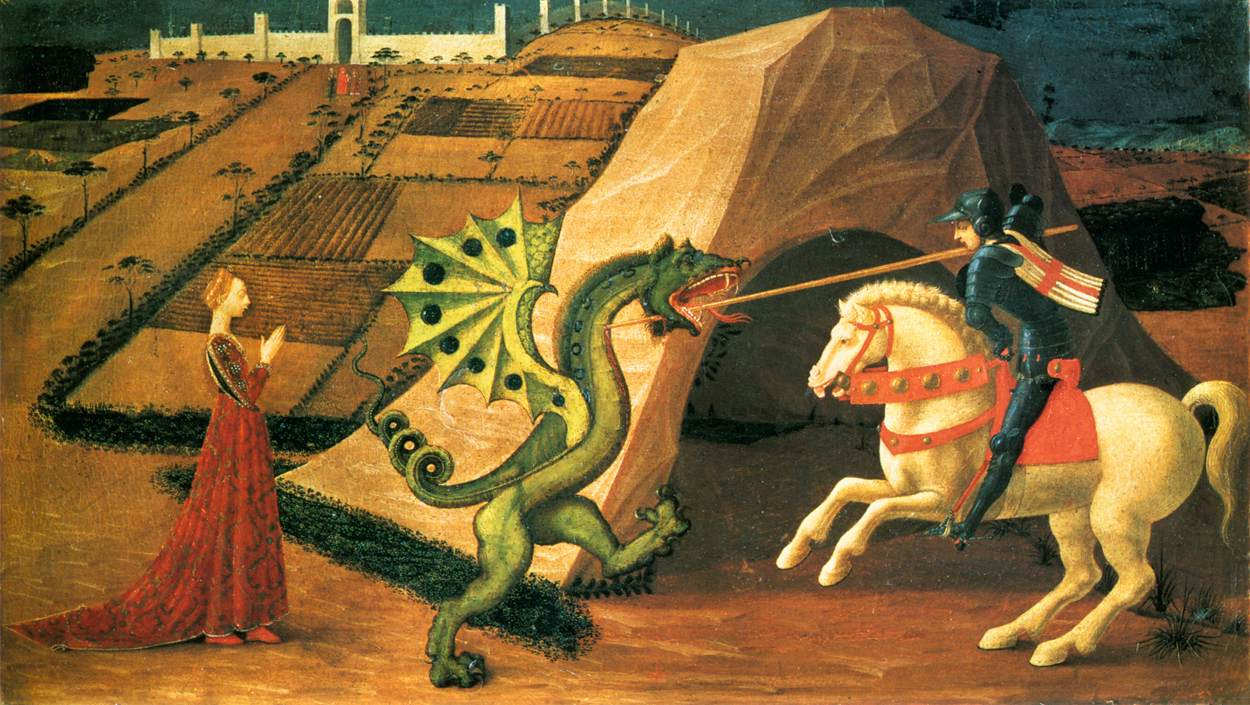
St George, the dragon and the Princess, by Paolo Uccello

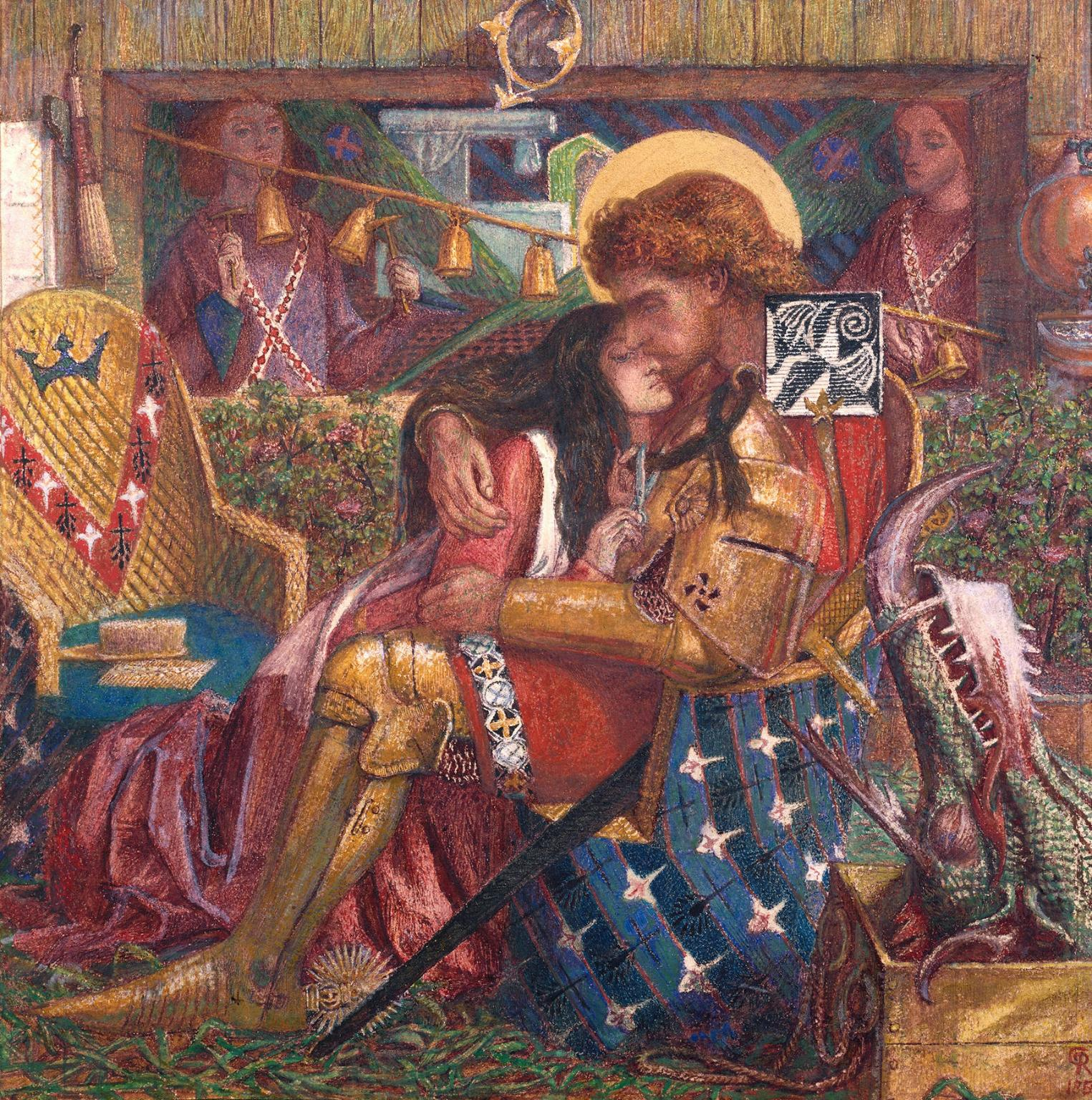
The Wedding of St George and Princess Sabra by Dante Gabriel Rossetti (1857)

In the General Roman Calendar, the feast of George is on 23 April. In the Tridentine calendar of 1568, it was given the rank of "Semidouble". In Pope Pius XII's 1955 calendar this rank was reduced to "Simple", and in Pope John XXIII's 1960 calendar to a "Commemoration". Since Pope Paul VI's 1969 revision, it appears as an "optional memorial". In some countries such as England, the rank is higher – it is a Solemnity (Roman Catholic) or Feast (Church of England): if it falls between Palm Sunday and the Second Sunday of Easter inclusive, it is transferred to the Monday after the Second Sunday of Easter.

George is very much honoured by the Eastern Orthodox Church, wherein he is referred to as a "Great Martyr", and in Oriental Orthodoxy overall. His major feast day is on 23 April (Julian calendar 23 April currently corresponds to Gregorian calendar 6 May). If, however, the feast occurs before Easter, it is celebrated on Easter Monday, instead. The Russian Orthodox Church also celebrates two additional feasts in honour of George. One is on 3 November, commemorating the consecration of a cathedral dedicated to him in Lydda during the reign of Constantine the Great (305–337). When the church was consecrated, the relics of George were transferred there. The other feast is on 26 November for a church dedicated to him in Kiev, c. 1054.

In Bulgaria, George's day (Bulgarian: Гергьовден) is celebrated on 6 May, when it is customary to slaughter and roast a lamb. George's day is also a public holiday.

In Serbia and Bosnia and Herzegovina, the Serbian Orthodox Church refers to George as Sveti Djordje (Свети Ђорђе) or Sveti Georgije (Свети Георгије). George's day (Đurđevdan) is celebrated on 6 May, and is a common slava (patron saint day) among ethnic Serbs.

In Egypt, the Coptic Orthodox Church of Alexandria refers to George (Coptic: Ⲡⲓⲇⲅⲓⲟⲥ Ⲅⲉⲟⲣⲅⲓⲟⲥ or ⲅⲉⲱⲣⲅⲓⲟⲥ) as the "Prince of Martyrs" and celebrates his martyrdom on the 23rd of Paremhat of the Coptic calendar, equivalent to 1 May. The Copts also celebrate the consecration of the first church dedicated to him on the seventh of the month of Hatour of the Coptic calendar usually equivalent to 17 November.

In India, the Syro-Malabar Catholic Church, one of the oriental catholic churches (Eastern Catholic Churches), and Malankara Orthodox Church venerate George. The main pilgrim centres of the saint in India are at Aruvithura and Puthuppally in Kottayam District, Edathua in Alappuzha district, and Edappally in Ernakulam district of the southern state of Kerala. The saint is commemorated each year from 27 April to 14 May at Edathua. On 27 April after the flag hoisting ceremony by the parish priest, the statue of the saint is taken from one of the altars and placed at the extension of the church to be venerated by devotees till 14 May. The main feast day is 7 May, when the statue of the saint along with other saints is taken in procession around the church. Intercession to George of Edathua is believed to be efficacious in repelling snakes and in curing mental ailments. The sacred relics of George were brought to Antioch from Mardin in 900 and were taken to Kerala, India, from Antioch in 1912 by Mar Dionysius of Vattasseril and kept in the Orthodox seminary at Kundara, Kerala. H.H. Mathews II Catholicos had given the relics to St. George churches at Puthupally, Kottayam District, and Chandanappally, Pathanamthitta district.

George is remembered in the Church of England with a Festival on 23 April.

Catholic Church feast days:

- 23 April – main commemoration
- 24 April – commemoration in Poland (23 April – commemoration of Saint Wojciech)
- 7 May – martyrdom in Lydda
- 20 June – commemoration of translation of relics to Anchin Abbey

Eastern Orthodox Church feast days:

- 27 January – Commemoration of the Miracle (deliverance of the island of Zakynthos from the plague) of the Great Martyr George in Zakynthos in 1689/1688. (Greek Orthodox Church)
- 12 April – Gerontius from Cappadocia, martyr, father of George, husband of Polychronia (c. 290)
- 23 April – Holy Glorious Great-martyr, Victory-bearer and Wonderworker George (303) [Death anniversary]
- 23 April – Polychronia from Cappadocia, martyr, mother of George, wife of Gerontius (303/304)
- 6 May – George's Day in Spring [BOC and SOC]
- 3 November – Dedication of the Church of the Great-martyr George in Lydda (4th century)
- 10 November – Commemoration of the torture of Great-martyr George in 303 [GOC]
- 26 November – Dedication of the Church of St. George at Kyiv (1051)

== Patronages ==
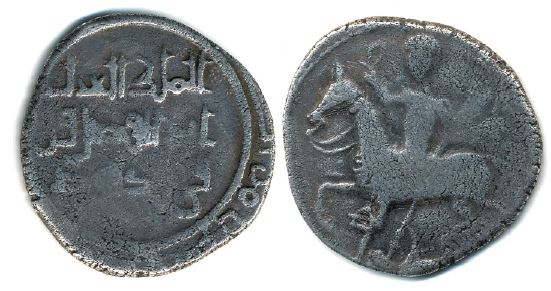
The earliest numismatic depiction of St. George. Coin of Kvirike III, Kingdom of Georgia, c. 1015

George is a highly celebrated saint in both the Western and Eastern Christian churches, and many patronages of Saint George exist throughout the world.

George is the patron saint of England. His cross forms the national flag of England, which overlaps with Scotland's St Andrew's flag to establish the Union Jack, which is contained in other national flags, such as those of Australia and New Zealand. By the 14th century, the saint had been declared both the patron saint and the protector of the British royal family.

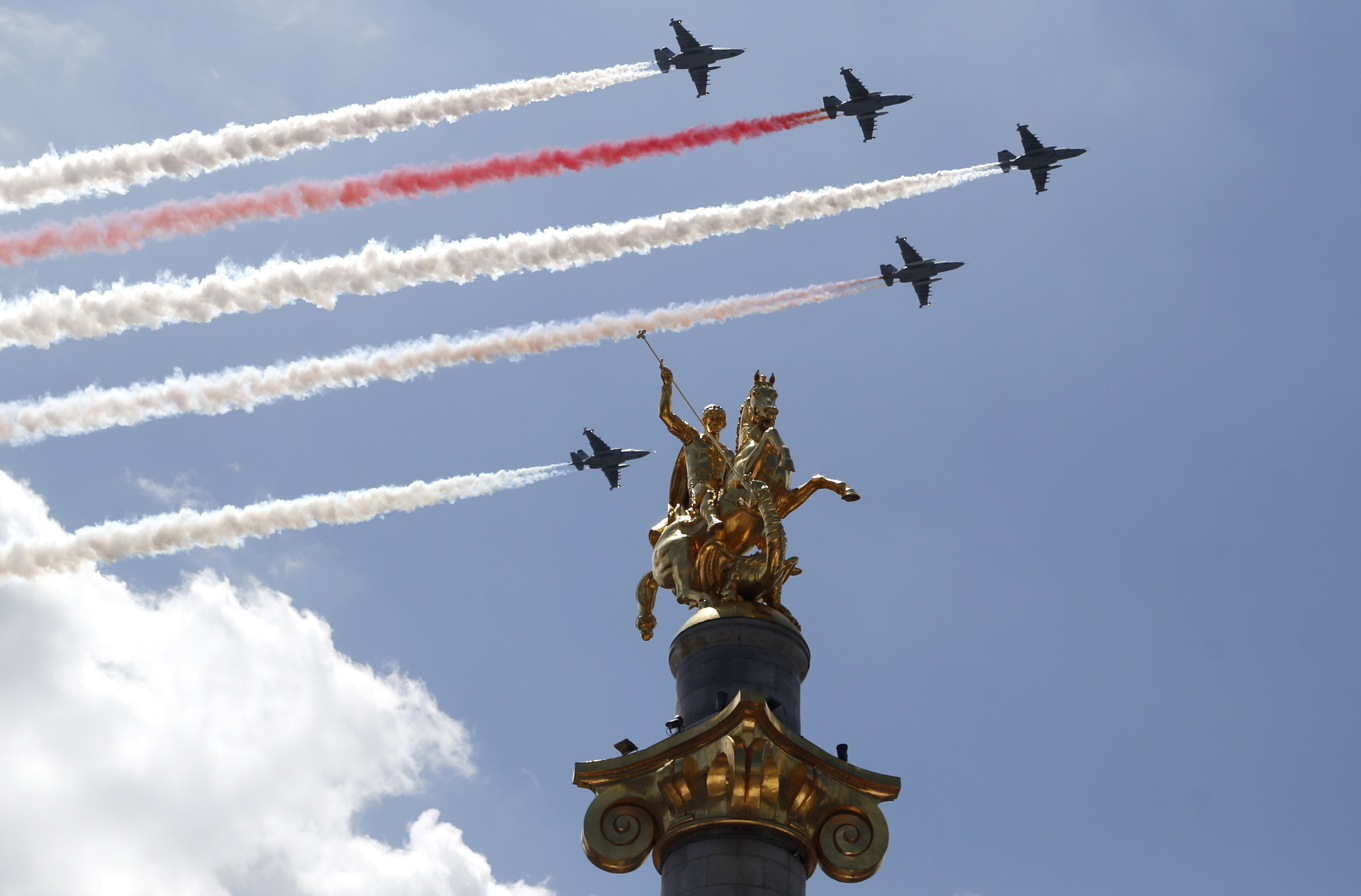
Monument to Saint George on Freedom Square, Tbilisi, Georgia

The country of Georgia, where devotions to the saint date back to the fourth century, is not technically named after the saint, but is a well-attested back-formation of the English name. However, many towns and cities around the world are. George is one of the patron saints of Georgia. Exactly 365 Orthodox churches in Georgia are named after George according to the number of days in a year. According to legend, George was cut into 365 pieces after he fell in battle and every single piece was spread throughout the entire country.

George is the patron saint of Ethiopia. He is also the patron saint of the Ethiopian Orthodox Church; George slaying the dragon is one of the most frequently used subjects of icons in the church.

George is also one of the patron saints of the Mediterranean island of Gozo, part of the Maltese archipelago. In a battle between the Maltese and the Moors, St. George was alleged to have been seen with St. Paul and St. Agatha, protecting the Maltese. George is the protector of the island of Gozo and the patron of Gozo's largest city, Victoria. St. George's Basilica in Victoria is dedicated to him.

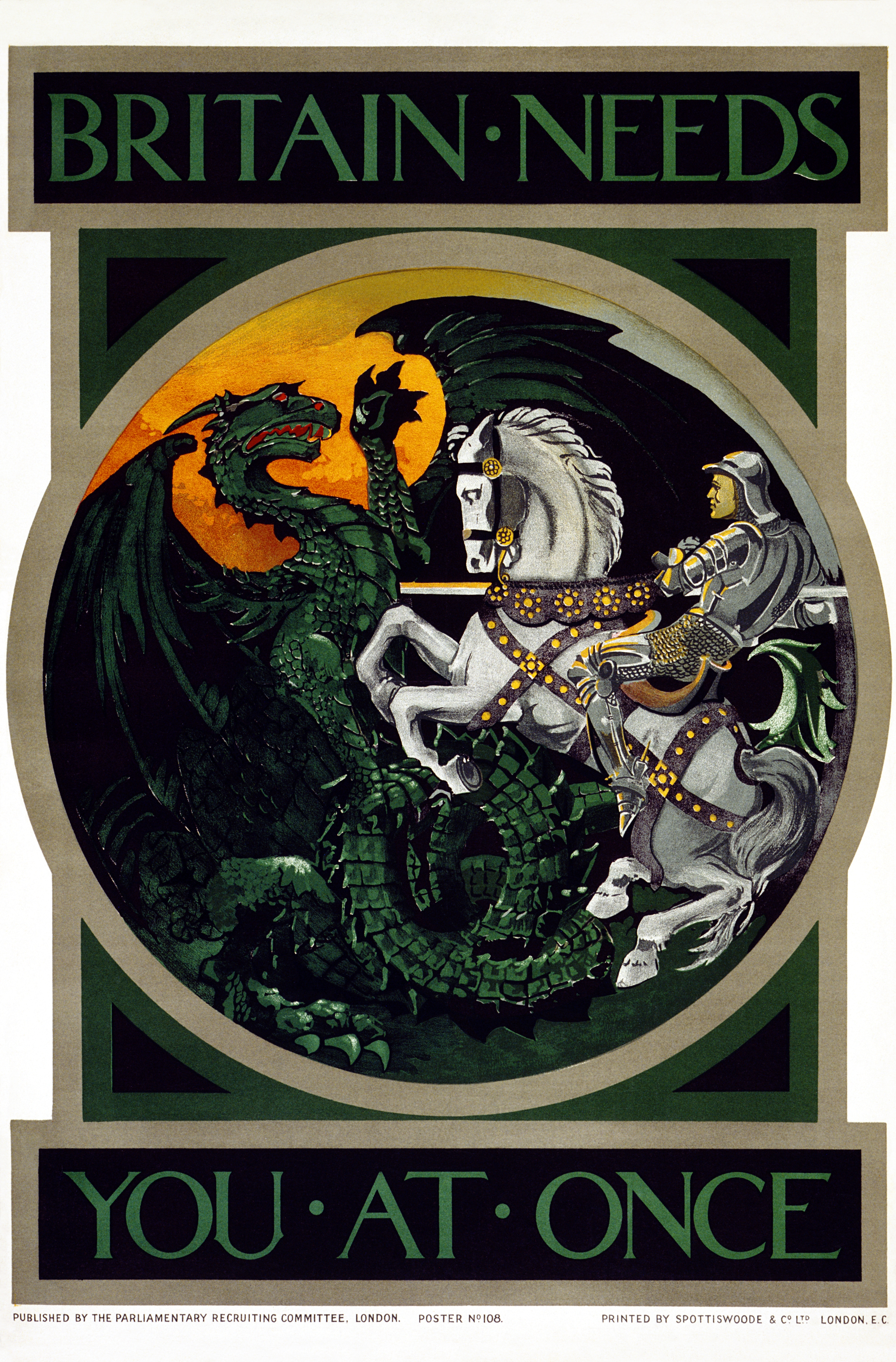
English recruitment poster from World War I, featuring George and the Dragon

In Portugal devotions to Saint George date back to the 12th century. Nuno Álvares Pereira attributed the victory of the Portuguese in the battle of Aljubarrota in 1385 to Saint George. During the reign of D. John I of Portugal (1357–1433), Saint George became the patron saint of Portugal and the king ordered that the saint's image on the horse be carried in the Corpus Christi procession. The flag of George (white with red cross) was also carried by the Portuguese troops and hoisted in the fortresses, during the 15th century. "Portugal and Saint George" (Portuguese: Portugal e São Jorge) became the battle cry of the Portuguese troops, being still today the battle cry of the Portuguese Army, with simply "Saint George" (Portuguese: São Jorge) being the battle cry of the Portuguese Navy.

Devotions to Saint George in Brazil was influenced by the Portuguese colonisation. Saint George is the unofficial patron saint of the city of Rio de Janeiro (the official patron being St. Sebastian) and of the city of São Jorge dos Ilhéus (Saint George of Ilhéus). Additionally, Saint George is the patron saint of the Scouts and Cavalry of the Brazilian Army. In May 2019, he was made official as the patron saint of the State of Rio de Janeiro, next to St. Sebastian. George is also revered in several Afro-Brazilian religions, such as Umbanda, where it is syncretised in the form of the orisha Ogun. However, the connection of George with the Moon is purely Brazilian, with a strong influence of African culture. Tradition says that the spots at the Moon's surface represent the miraculous saint, his horse and his sword slaying the dragon and ready to defend those who seek his help.

George is also the patron saint of the region of Aragon, in Spain, where his feast day is celebrated on 23 April and is known as "Aragon Day", or Día de Aragón in Spanish. He became the patron saint of the former Kingdom of Aragon and Crown of Aragon when King Pedro I of Aragon won the battle of Alcoraz in 1096. Legend has it that victory eventually fell to the Christian armies when George appeared to them on the battlefield, helping them secure the conquest of the city of Huesca which had been under the Muslim control of the Taifa of Zaragoza. The battle, which had begun two years earlier in 1094, was long and arduous, and had also taken the life of King Pedro's own father, King Sancho Ramirez. With the Aragonese spirits flagging, it is said that George descending from heaven on his charger and bearing a dark red cross, appeared at the head of the Christian cavalry leading the knights into battle. Interpreting this as a sign of protection from God, the Christian militia returned emboldened to the battle field, more energised than ever, convinced theirs was the banner of the one true faith. Defeated, the Moors rapidly abandoned the battlefield. After two years of being locked down under siege, Huesca fell and King Pedro made his triumphal entry into the city. To celebrate this victory, the cross of St. George was adopted as the personal coat of arms of Huesca and Aragon. After the fall of Huesca, King Pedro aided the military leader and nobleman, Rodrigo Díaz de Vivar, otherwise known as El Cid, with a coalition army from Aragon in the long conquest of the Kingdom of Valencia.

Tales of King Pedro's success at Huesca and in leading his expedition of armies with El Cid against the Moors, under the auspices of George on his standard, spread quickly throughout the realm and beyond the Crown of Aragon, and Christian armies throughout Europe quickly began adopting George as their protector and patron, during all subsequent Crusades to the Holy Land. By 1117, the military order of Templars adopted the Cross of St. George as a simple, unifying sign for international Christian militia embroidered on the left hand side of their tunics, placed above the heart.

The Cross of St. George, also known in Aragon as the Cross of Alcoraz, continues to emblazon the flags of all of Aragon's provinces.

The association of St. George with chivalry and noblemen in Aragon continued through the ages. Indeed, even the author Miguel de Cervantes, in his book on the adventures of Don Quixote, also mentions the jousting events that took place at the festival of St. George in Zaragoza in Aragon where one could gain international renown in winning a joust against any of the knights of Aragon.

Saint George (Catalan: Sant Jordi) is also the patron saint of Catalonia. His cross appears in many buildings and local flags, including the flag of Barcelona, the Catalan capital, the crest of FC Barcelona as well as in the ancient emblem of the Generalitat. The first references of devotion to Saint George in Catalonia came back to the 11th century. The legend of the saint spread throughout the Principality of Catalonia until, in 1456, he was officially named by the Catalan Courts (the parliament) as the patron saint of Catalonia, and the annual commemoration involving roses began. A Catalan variation to the traditional legend places George's life story as having occurred in the town of Montblanc, near Tarragona. One of the highest civil distinctions awarded by the Government of Catalonia is the St. George's Cross (Creu de Sant Jordi). The Sant Jordi Awards have been awarded in Barcelona since 1957.

In Valencia, Catalonia, the Balearics, Malta, Sicily and Sardinia, the origins of the veneration of St. George go back to their shared history as territories under the Crown of Aragon, thereby sharing the same legend.

In 1469, the Order of St. George (Habsburg-Lorraine) was founded in Rome by Emperor Frederick III of Habsburg in the presence of Pope Paul II. The order was continued and promoted by his son, Emperor Maximilian I of Habsburg. The later history of the order was eventful, in particular the order was dissolved by Nazi Germany. Only after the fall of the Iron Curtain and the collapse of communism in Central and Eastern Europe was the order reactivated as a European association in association with Saint George by the Habsburg family.

== Arms and flag ==
George's cross

It became fashionable in the 15th century, with the full development of classical heraldry, to provide attributed arms to saints and other historical characters from the pre-heraldic ages. The widespread attribution to George of the red cross on a white field in Western art – "Saint George's Cross" – probably first arose in Genoa, which had adopted this image for their flag and George as their patron saint in the 12th century. A vexillum beati Georgii is mentioned in the Genovese annals for the year 1198, referring to a red flag with a depiction of George and the dragon. An illumination of this flag is shown in the annals for the year 1227. The Genovese flag with the red cross was used alongside this "George's flag", from at least 1218, and was known as the insignia cruxata comunis Janue ("cross ensign of the commune of Genoa"). The flag showing the saint himself was the city's principal war flag, but the flag showing the plain cross was used alongside it in the 1240s.

In 1348, Edward III of England chose George as the patron saint of his Order of the Garter, and also took to using a red-on-white cross in the hoist of his Royal Standard.

The term "Saint George's cross" was at first associated with any plain Greek cross touching the edges of the field (not necessarily red on white). Thomas Fuller in 1647 spoke of "the plain or St George's cross" as "the mother of all the others" (that is, the other heraldic crosses).

== Iconography ==
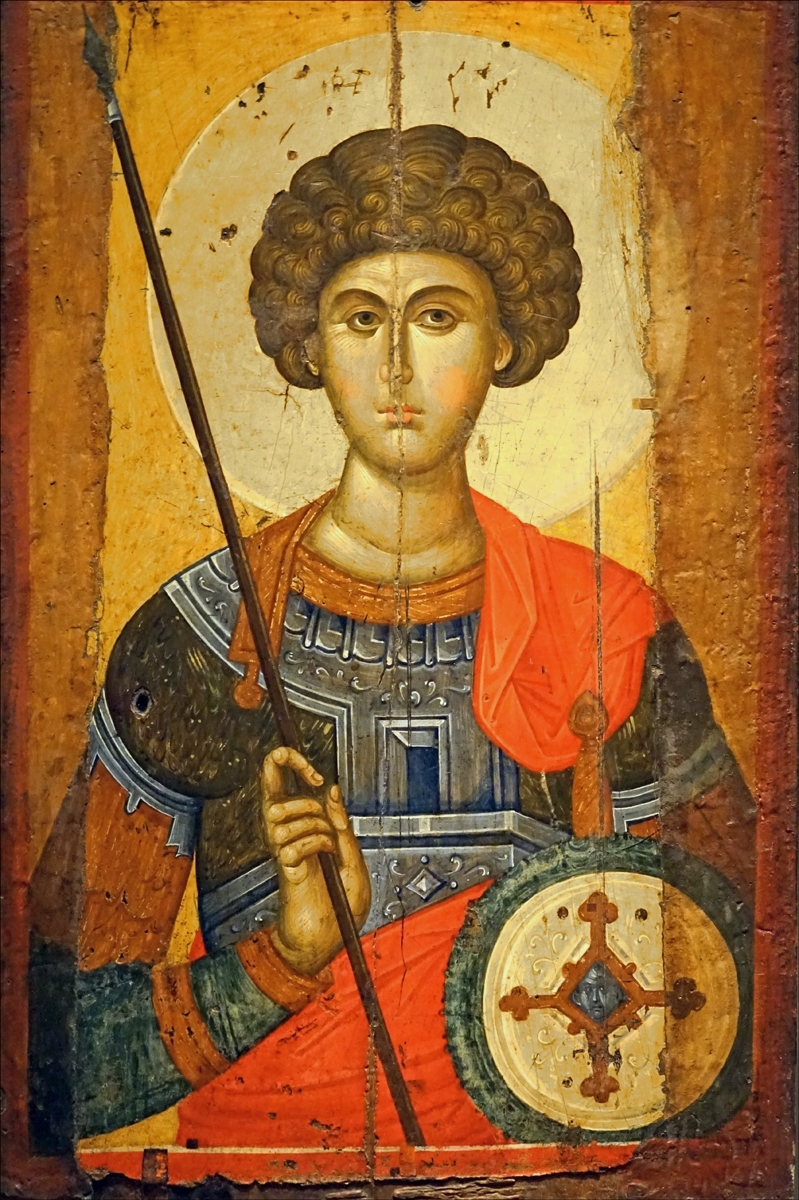
Byzantine icon of George, Athens, Greece

George is most commonly depicted in early icons, mosaics, and frescos wearing armour contemporary with the depiction, executed in gilding and silver colour, intended to identify him as a Roman soldier. Particularly after the Fall of Constantinople and George's association with the crusades, he is often portrayed mounted upon a white horse. Thus, a 2003 Vatican stamp (issued on the anniversary of the Saint's death) depicts an armoured George atop a white horse, killing the dragon.

Eastern Orthodox iconography also permits George to ride a white horse, as in a Russian icon in the British Museum collection. In the south Lebanese village of Mieh Mieh, the Saint George Church for Melkite Catholics commissioned for its 75th jubilee in 2012 (under the guidance of Mgr Sassine Gregoire) the only icons in the world portraying the whole life of George, as well as the scenes of his torture and martyrdom (drawn in eastern iconographic style).

George may also be portrayed with Saint Demetrius, another early soldier saint. When the two saintly warriors are together and mounted upon horses, they may resemble earthly manifestations of the archangels Michael and Gabriel. Eastern traditions distinguish the two as George rides a white horse and Demetrius a red horse (the red pigment may appear black if it has bituminised). George can also be identified by his spearing a dragon, whereas Demetrius may be spearing a human figure, representing Maximian.

=== Gallery ===
Eastern

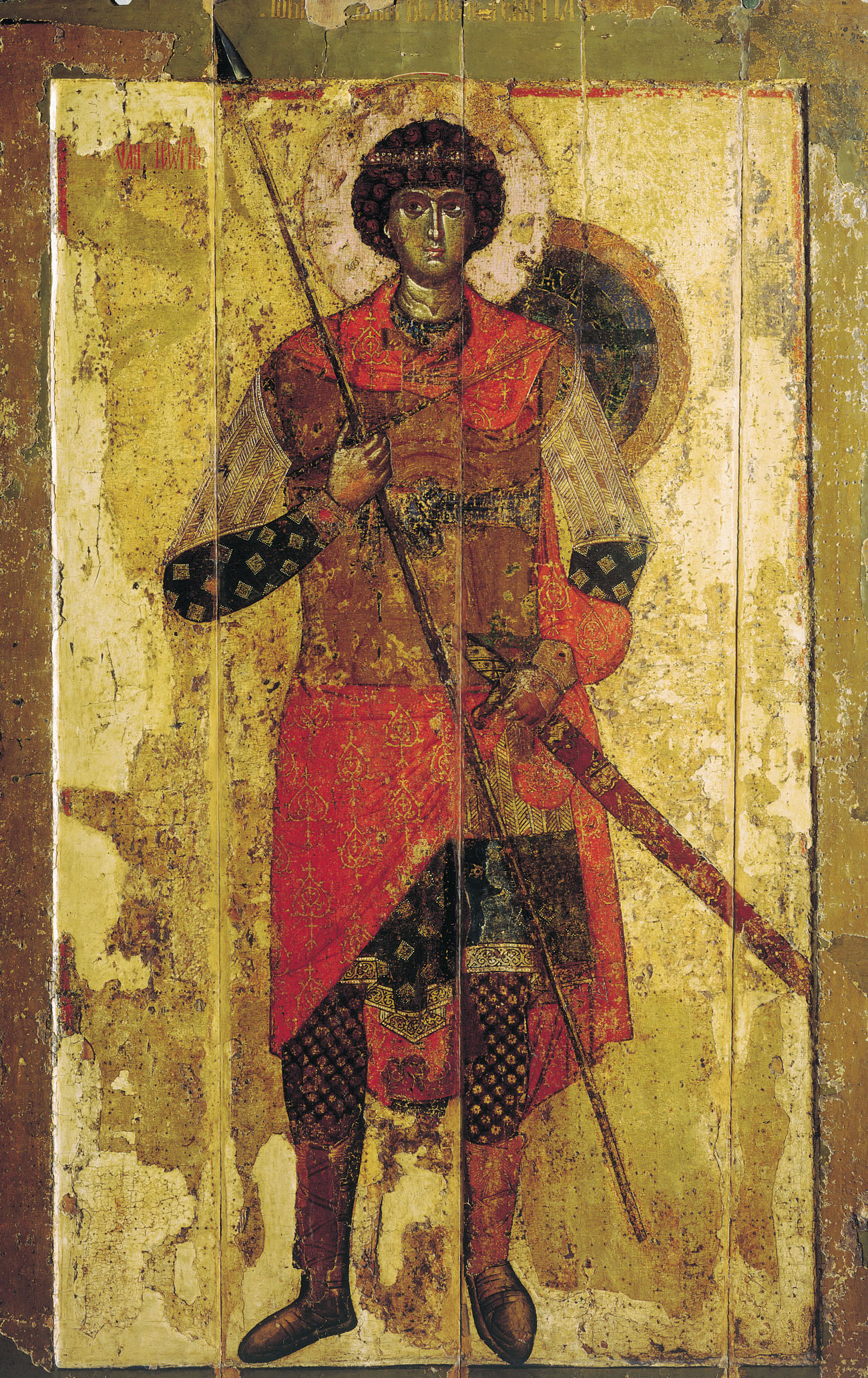
Main icon of Yuriev Monastery in Novgorod, Russia (c. 1130)

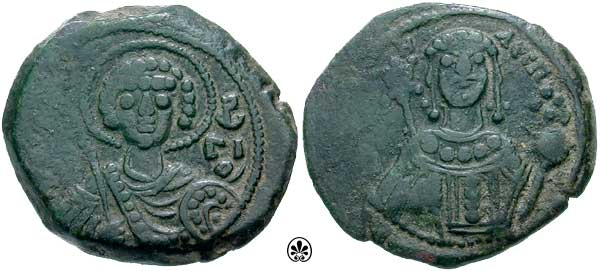
Tetarteron of Manuel I Komnenos, showing a bust of George (12th century)

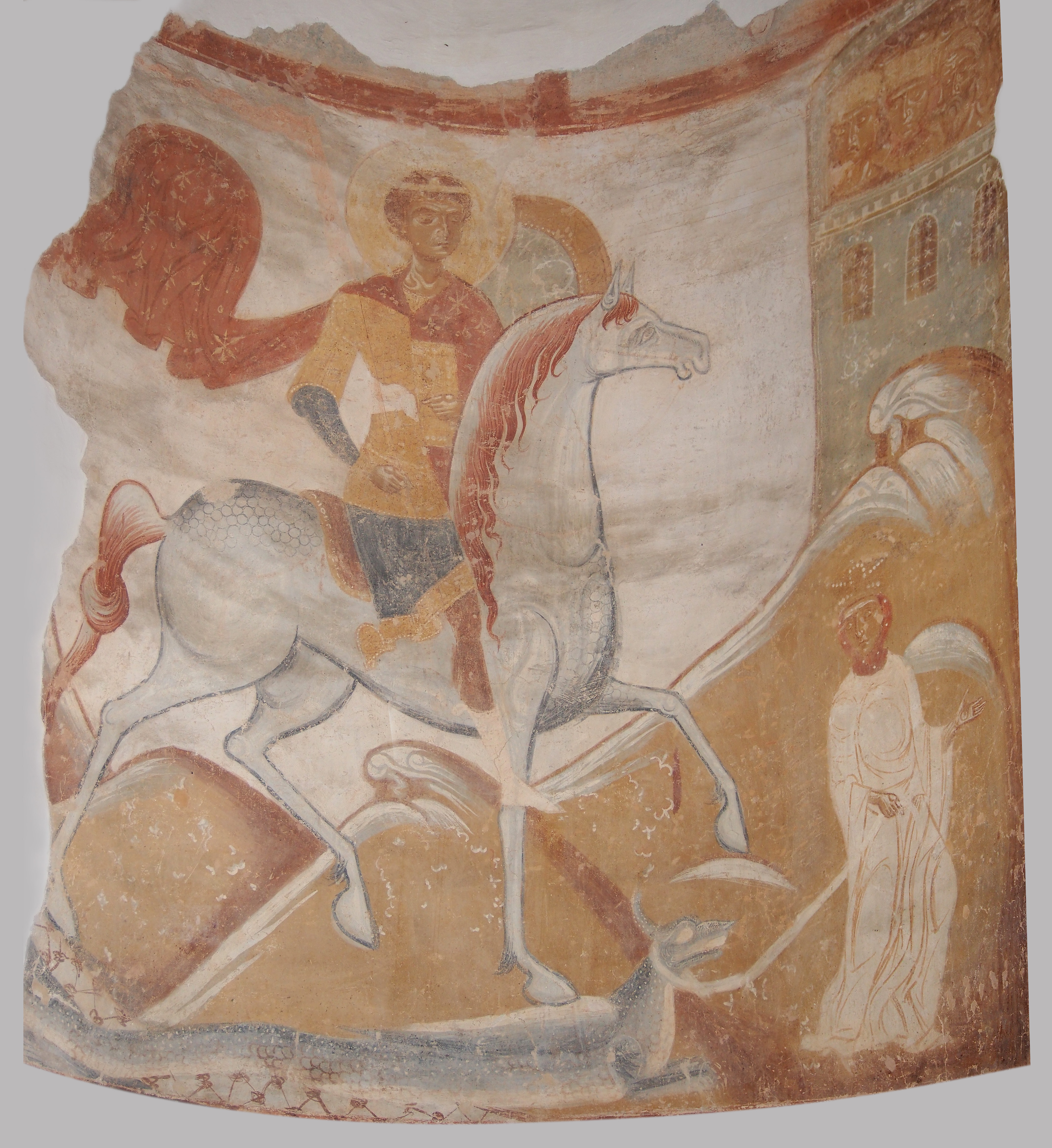
A depiction of Saint George in a church dedicated to him at Staraya Ladoga Fortress in Staraya Ladoga (12th century)

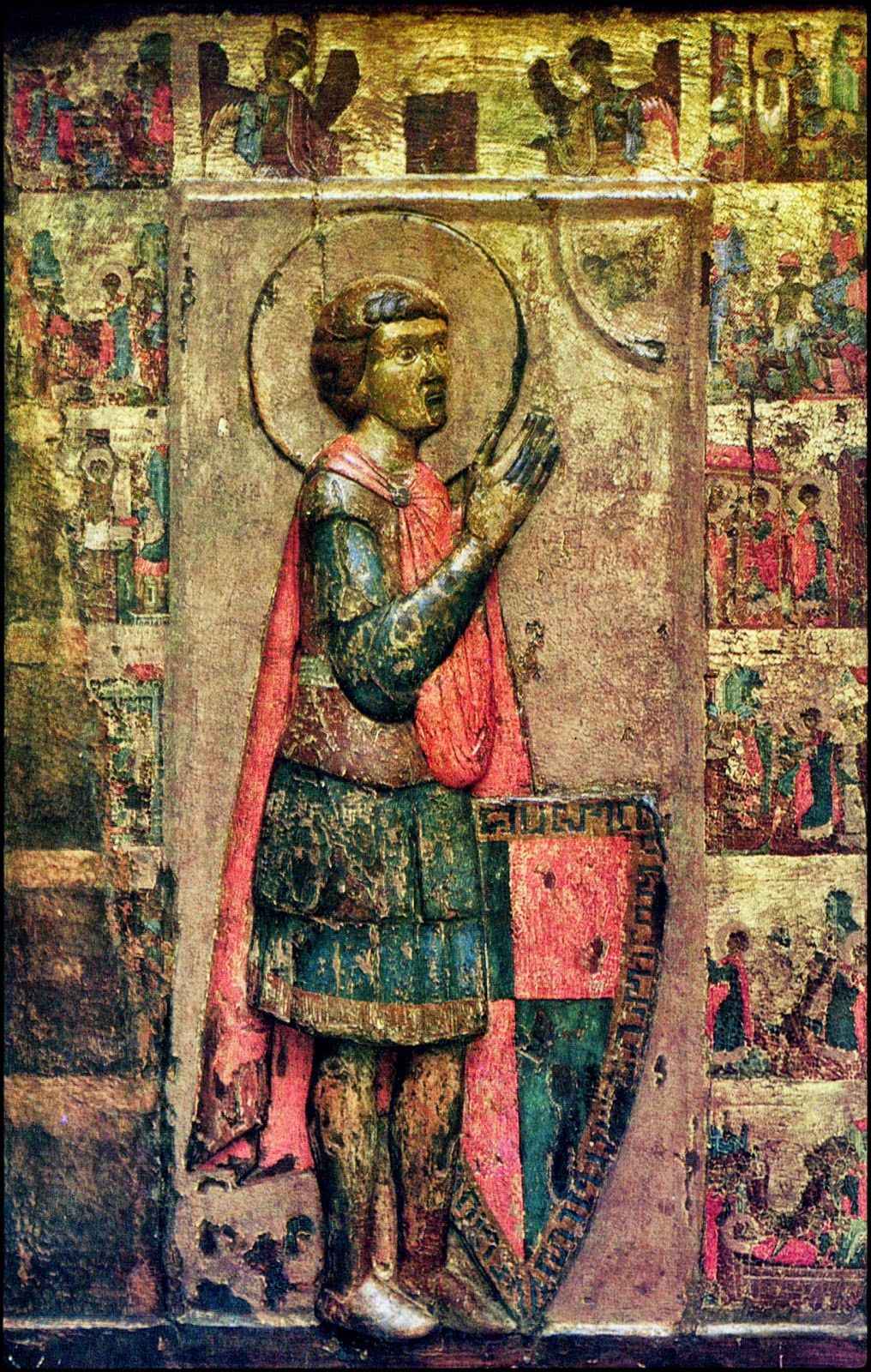
Relief icon from Kastoria, now located at the Byzantine and Christian Museum, Athens, Greece (late 13th century)

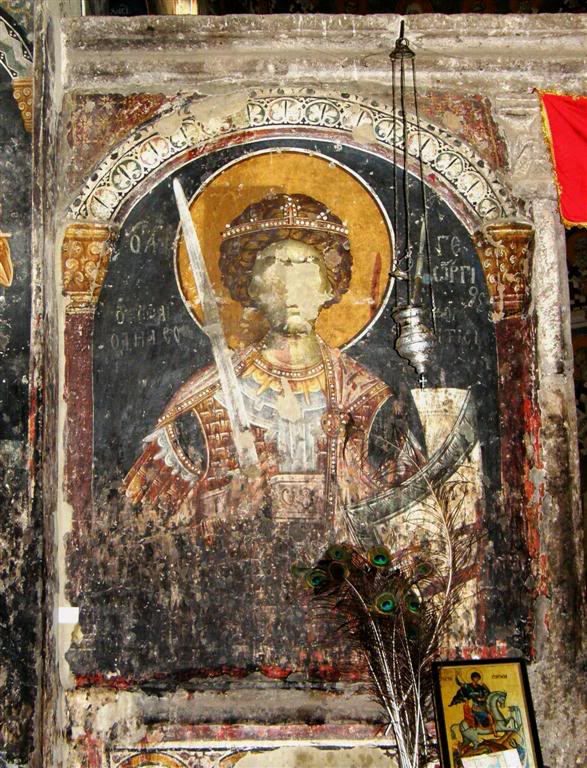
Saint George depicted on an icon part of an iconostasis in the Church of St. George, Staro Nagoričane, North Macedonia (14th century)

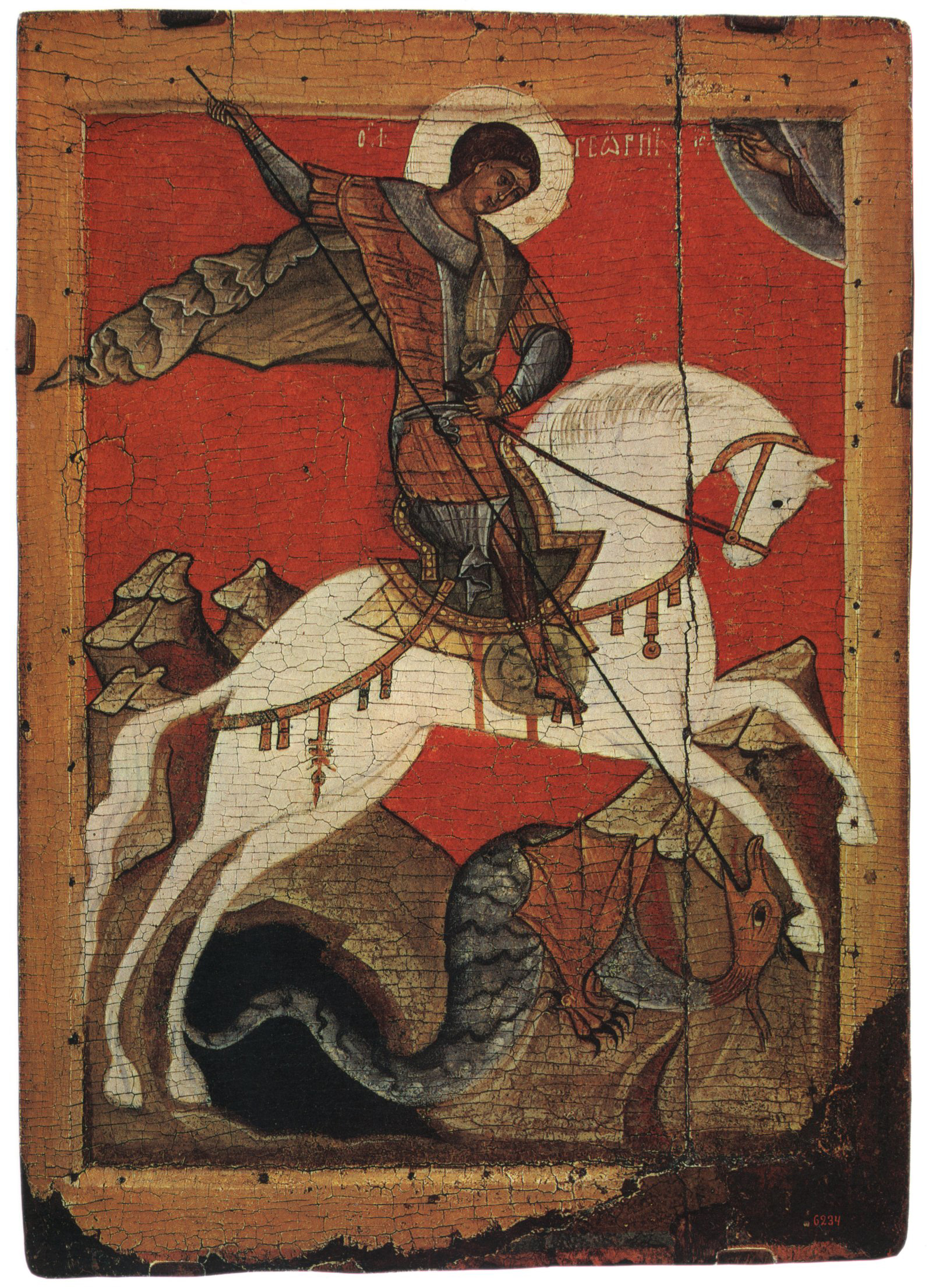
Saint George and the Dragon, Russian icon (15th century)

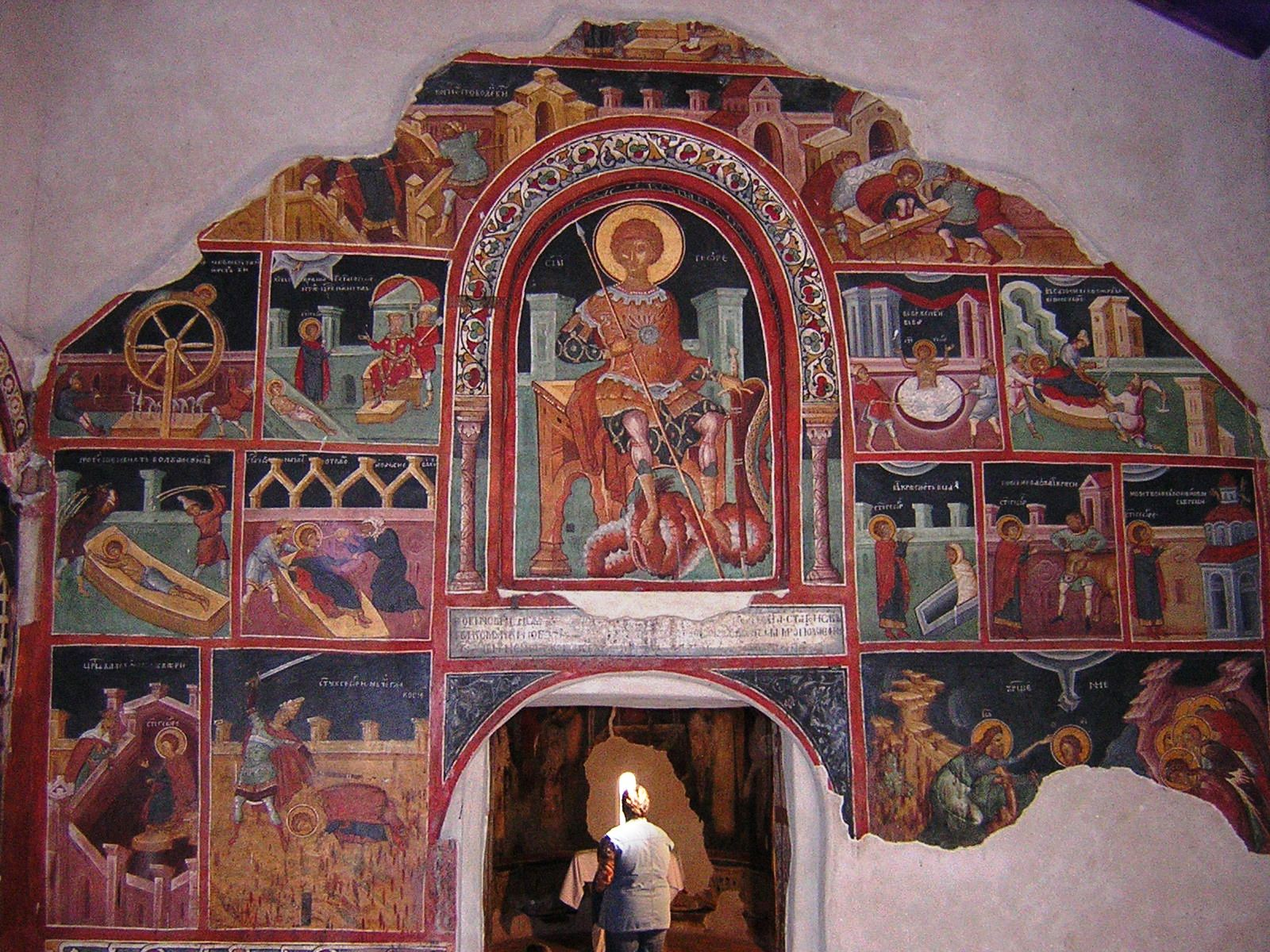
Scenes from the life of George, Kremikovtsi Monastery, Bulgaria (15th century)

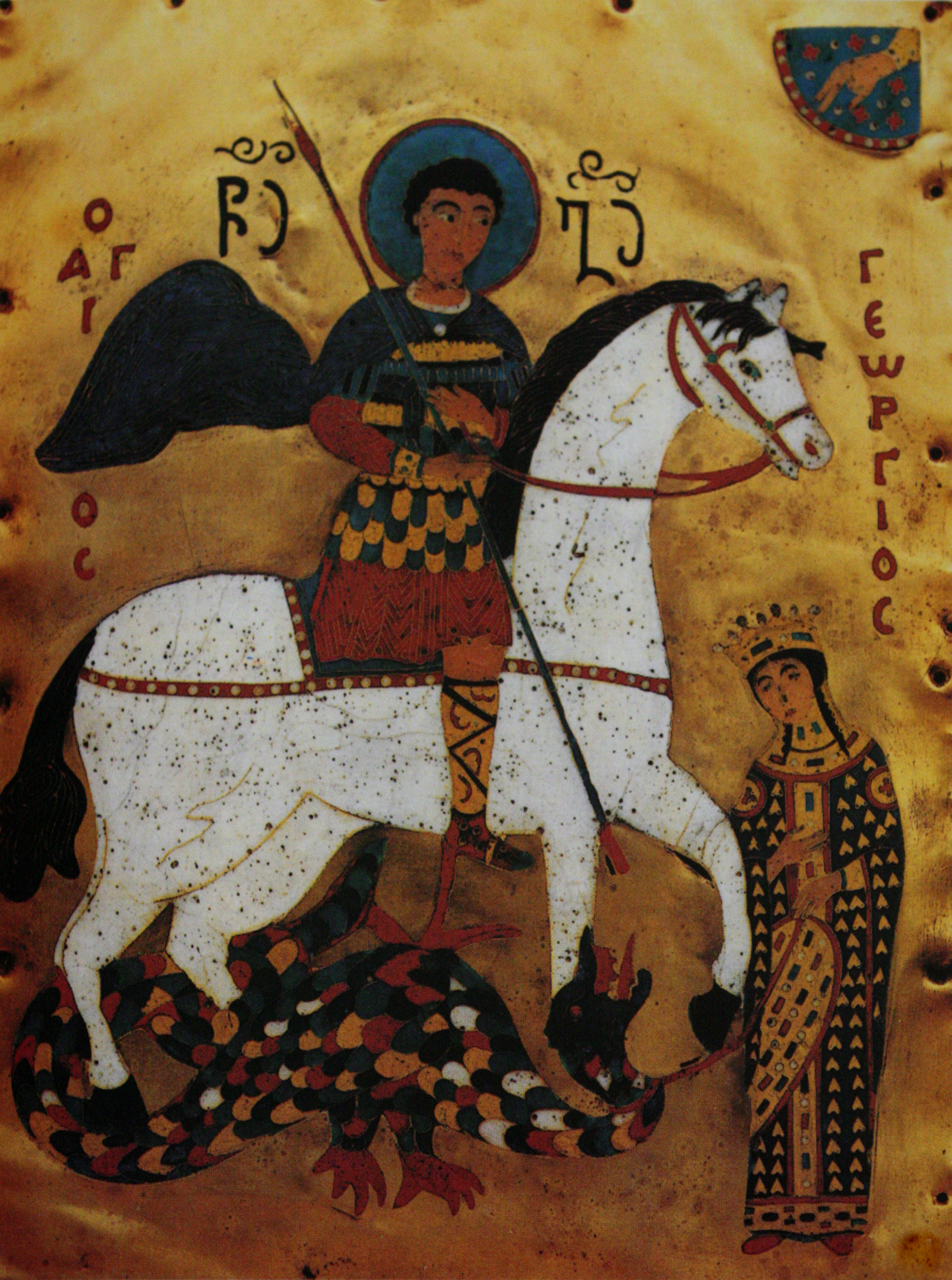
A plaque, on which is represented George rescuing the emperor's daughter (15th century)

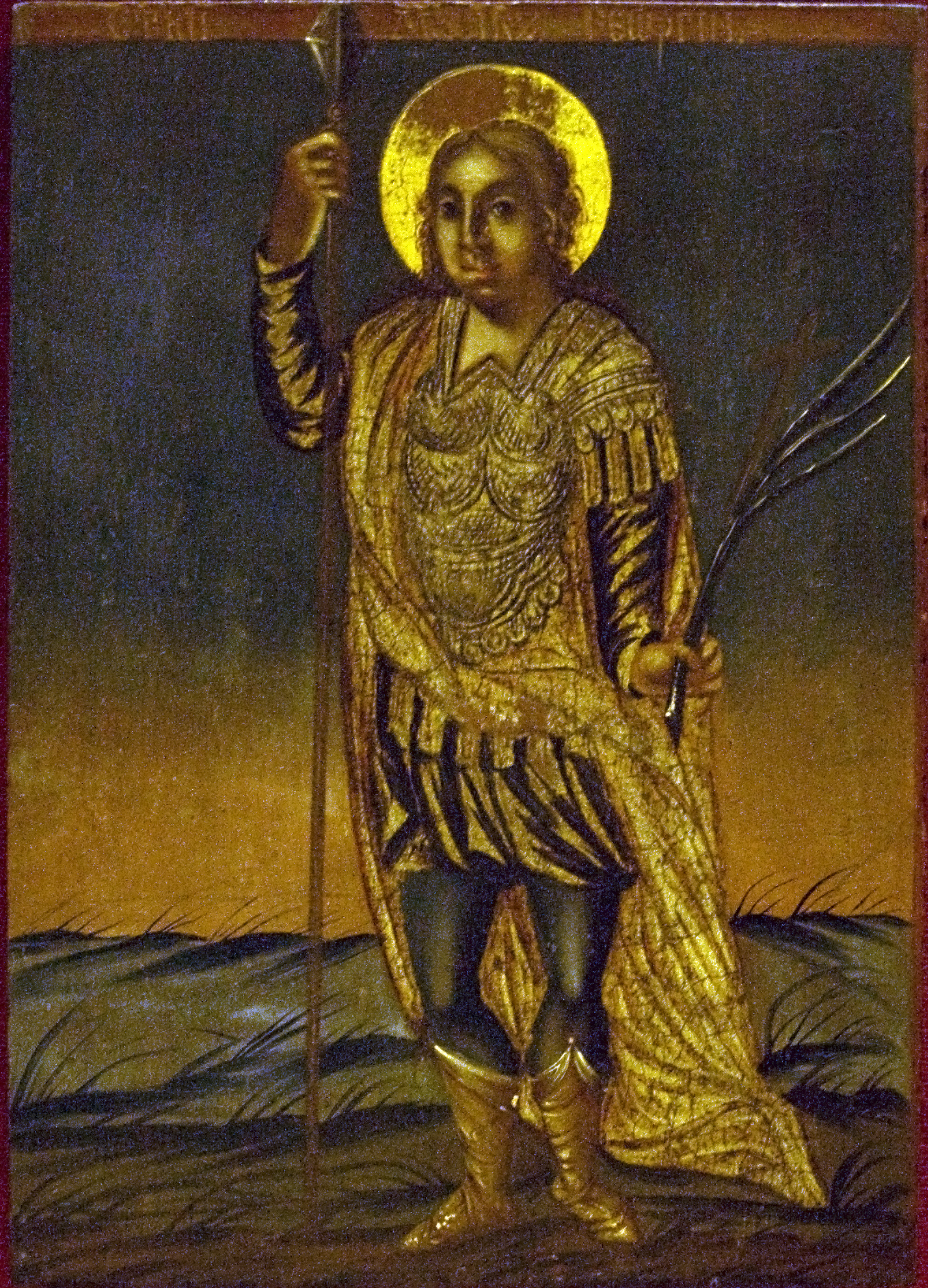
Greek Orthodox icon in the Greek Orthodox Church and Museum, Miskolc (c. 1770)

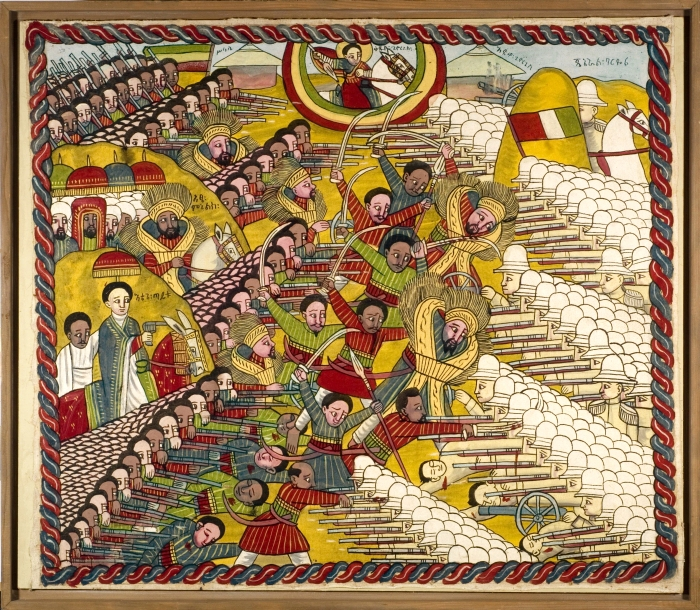
"Ethiopian Empire forces, assisted by St George (top), win the Battle of Adwa against Italy. Painted 1965–75."

Western

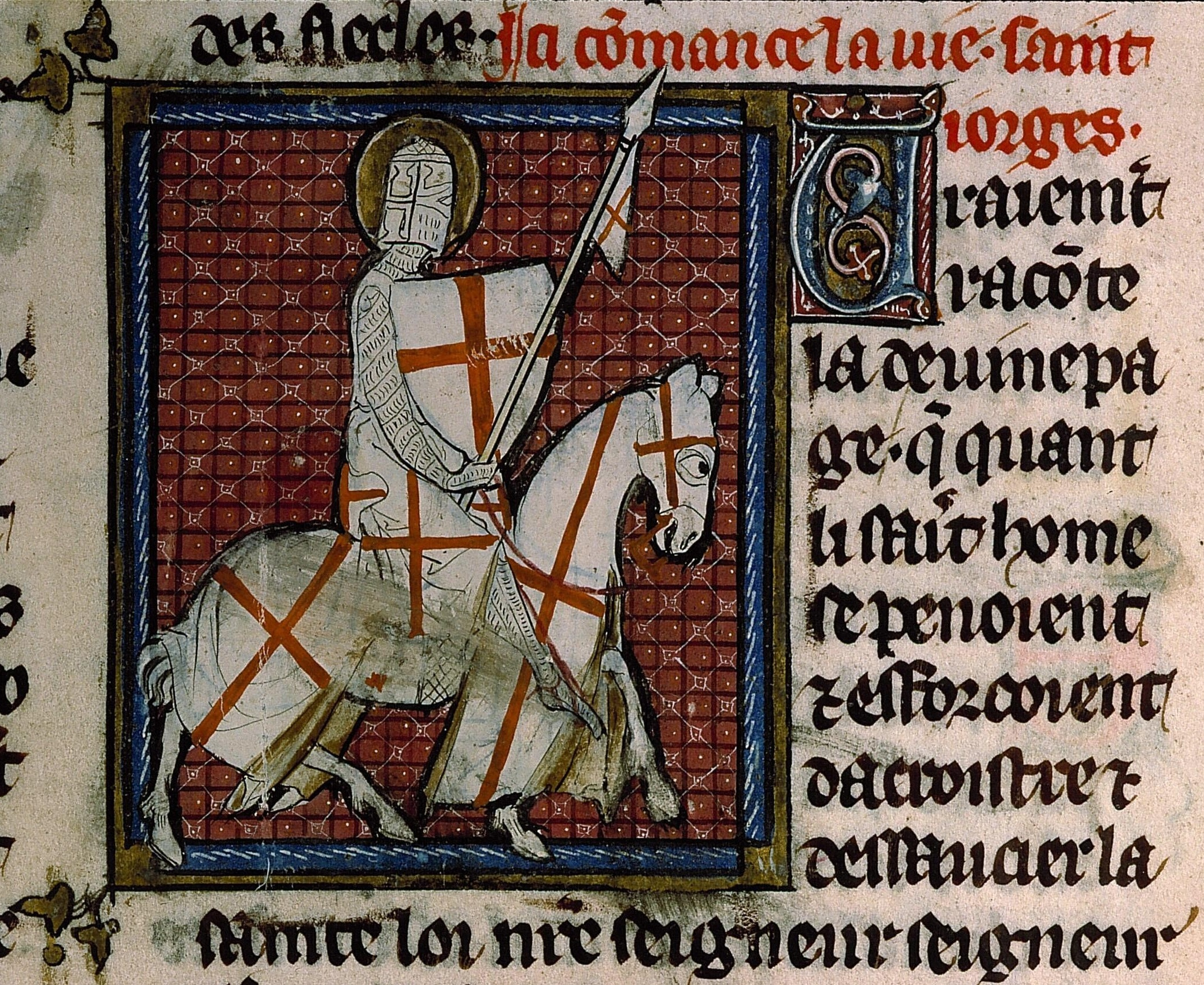
George as a knight, miniature from a ms. of Vies de Saints, c. 1290–1310 (Bibliothèque Sainte-Geneviève, Manuscrit 588)

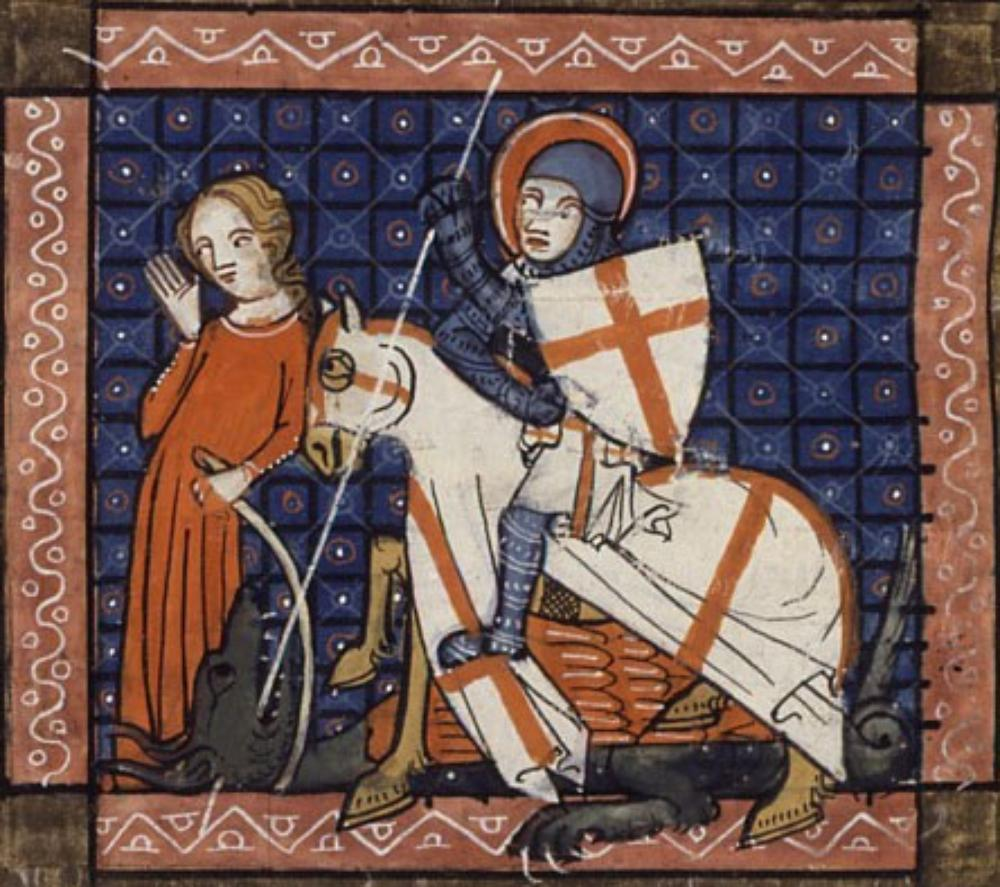
Miniature of George and the Dragon, ms. of the Legenda Aurea, dated 1348 (BNF Français 241, fol. 101v.)

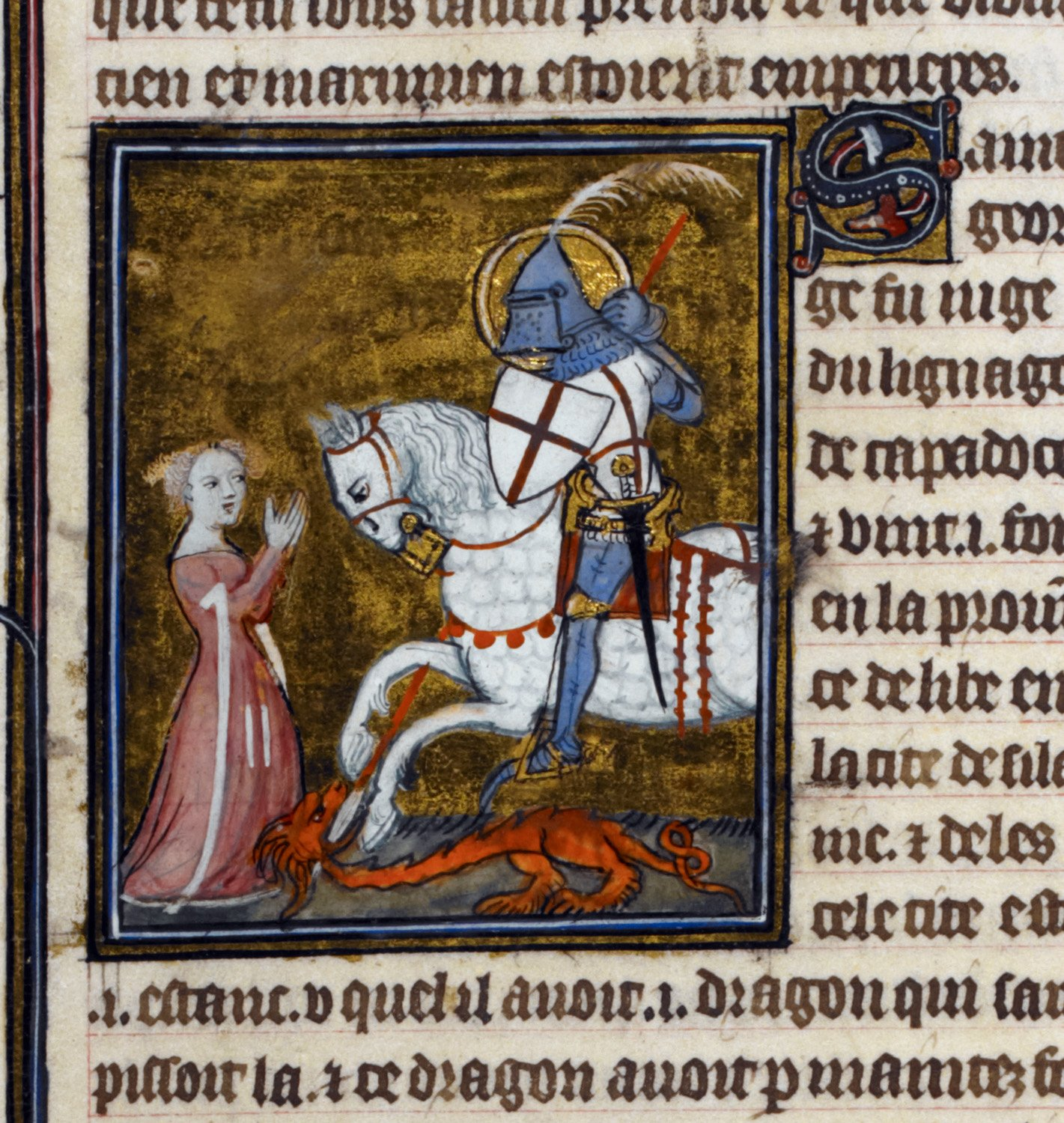
Miniature of George and the Dragon, ms. of the Legenda Aurea, Paris, 1382 (BL Royal 19 B XVII, f. 109).

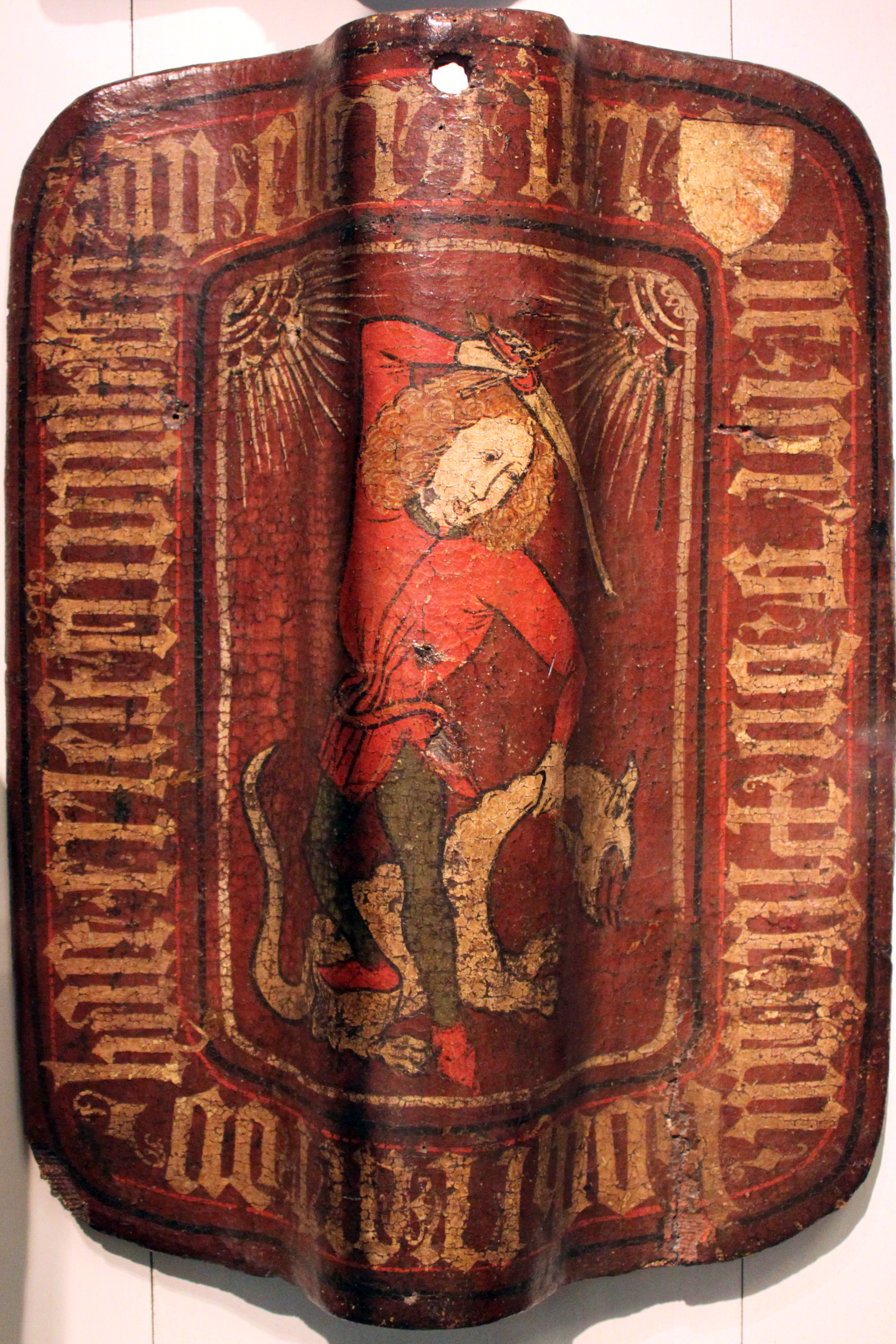
George on a small pavise (Nuremberg, c. 1480)

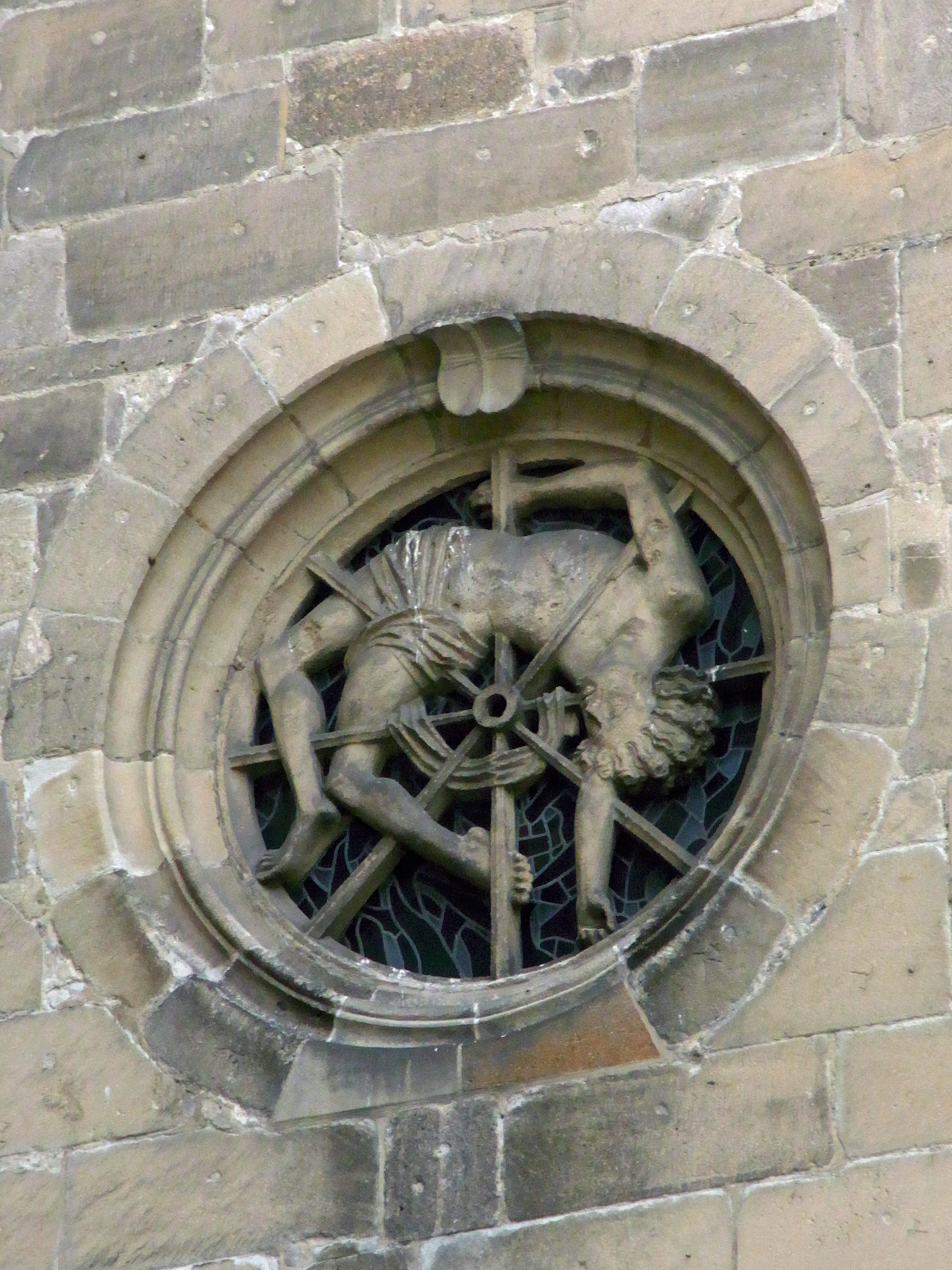
George as a martyr: St. George's Collegiate Church in Tübingen (15th century)

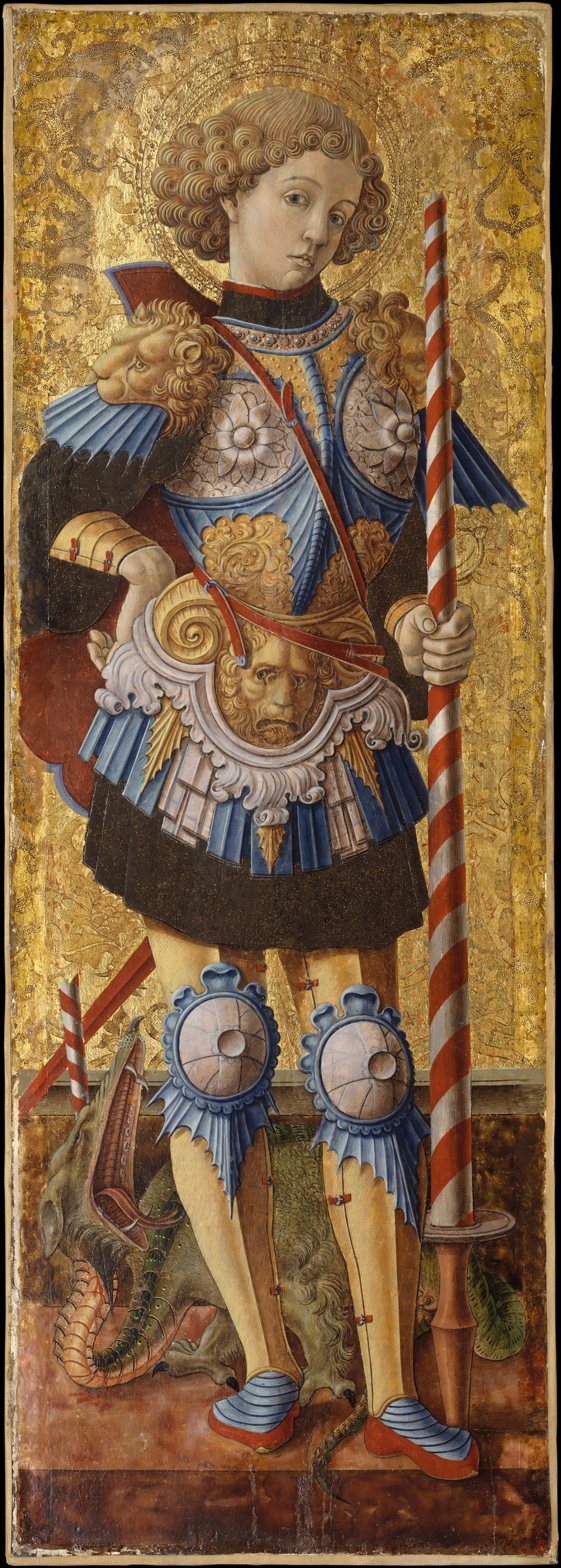
George by Carlo Crivelli

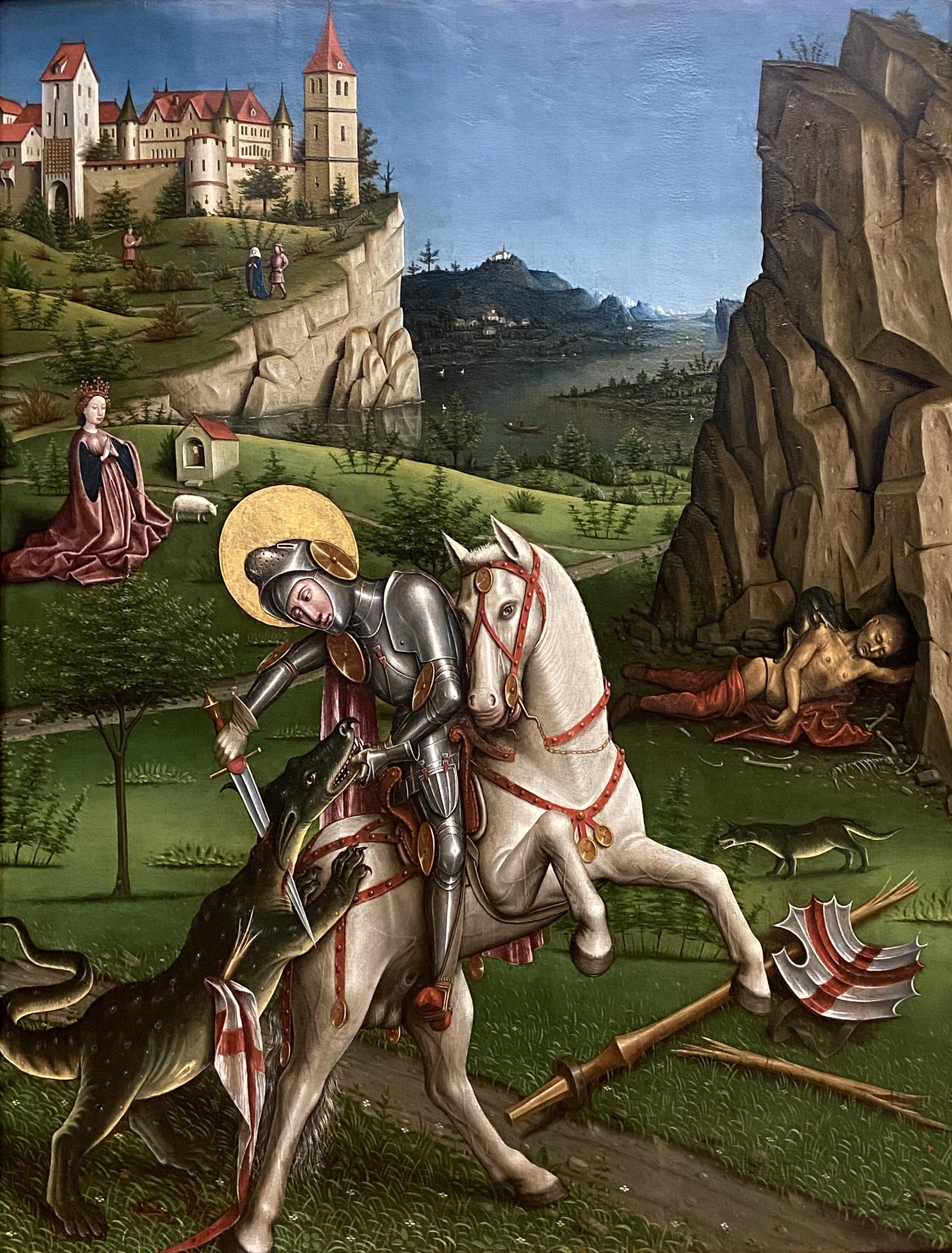
St.George by the Master of Sierentz (1440–1450)

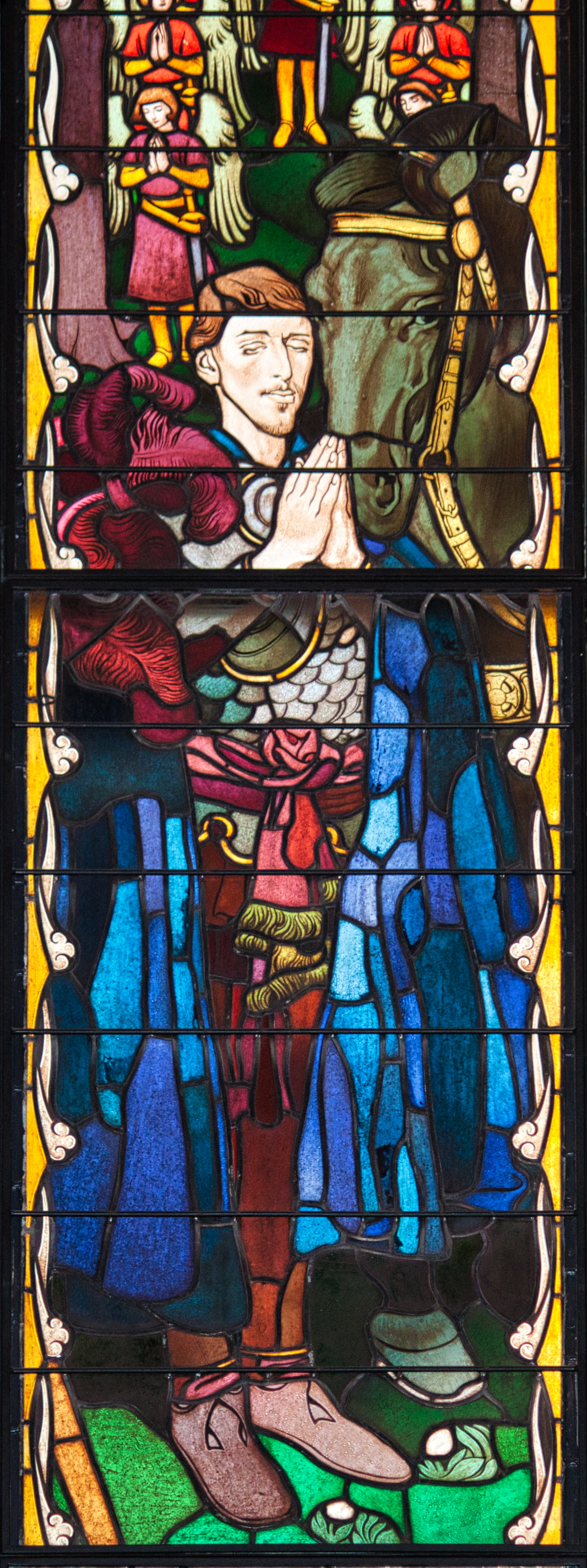
Stained-glass (by J. Mehoffer), Fribourg Cathedral

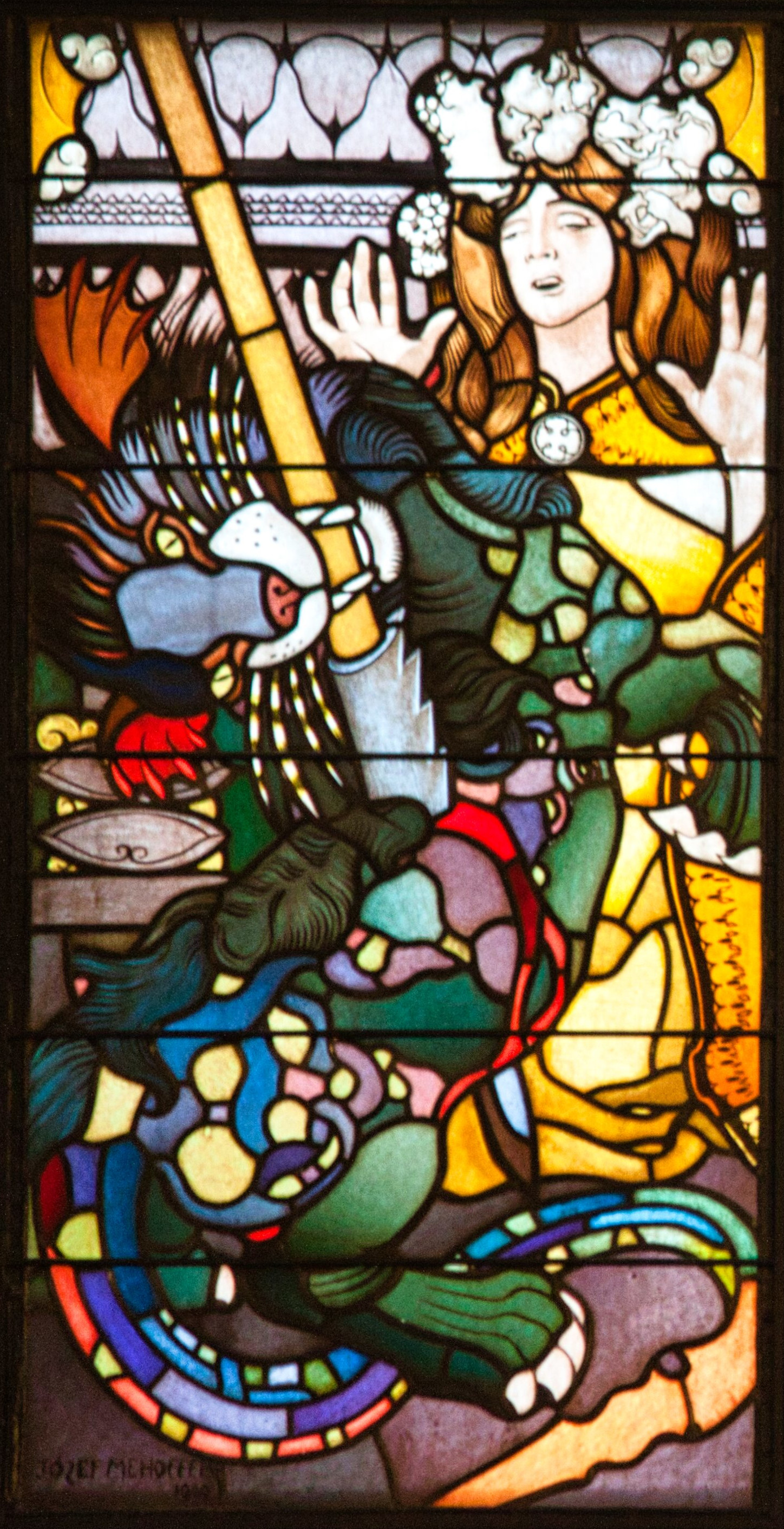
Stained-glass (by J. Mehoffer, Fribourg Cathedral)

== See also ==
- Moors and Christians of Alcoy, an international historical festival dedicated to George in Alcoy (Alicante), Spain
- Uastyrdzhi, Ossetian name for George
- Church of Saint George (Lod)
- Sacred Relic of Saint George
- List of Anglo-Saxon saints
- List of Cornish saints
- List of Northumbrian saints
- Patron saints of the Hen Ogledd, historical region, now Northern England and the southern Scottish Lowlands

== Sources ==
- Lampinen, Antti; Mataix-Ferrándiz, Emilia (2022). Seafaring and Mobility in the Late Antique Mediterranean. Bloomsbury Publishing. ISBN 9781350201712.
- Cavallo, Guglielmo (1997). The Byzantines. University of Chicago Press. ISBN 9780226097923.
