= Great Omari Mosque of Lod =

Mosque in Lod, Israel

- Arabic: المسجد العمري الكبير
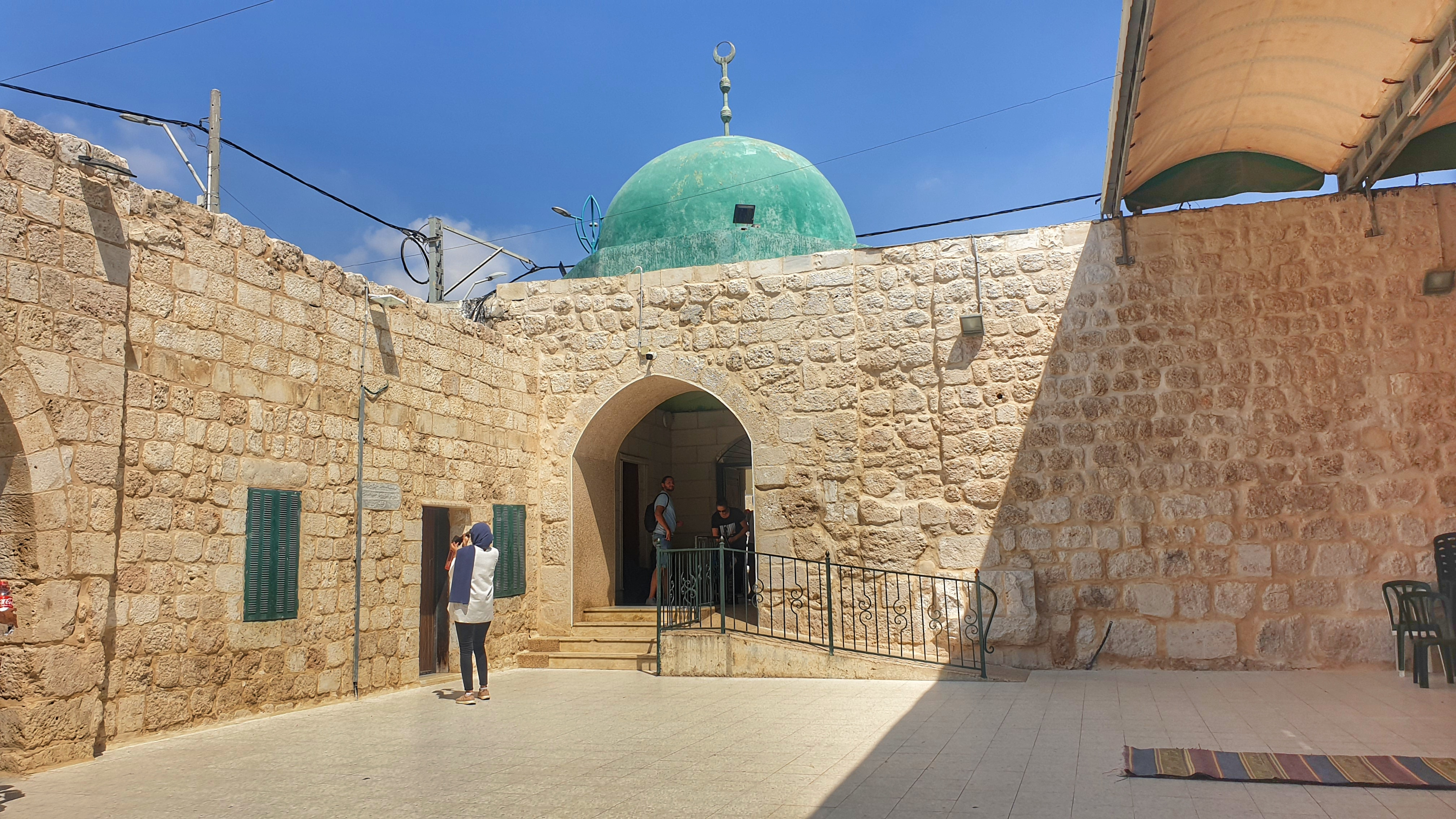
- The mosque in 2019, viewed from the sahn

- Location of the mosque in central Israel

Religion
- Affiliation: Sunni Islam
- Ecclesiastical or organizational status: Church (5th–13th centuries CE); Friday mosque (since c. 15th century CE)
- Status: Active

Location
- Location: Lod
- Country: Israel
- Interactive map of Great Omari Mosque of Lod
- Coordinates: 31°57′10.8″N 34°53′58.15″E

Architecture
- Type: Mosque architecture
- Style: Mamluk; Byzantine remnants
- Completed: 5th century CE (as a church); 15th century CE (as a mosque)
- Destroyed: 1191 CE (as a church)

Specifications
- Dome: One
- Minaret: One

The Great Omari Mosque of Lod, also known as al-Omari Mosque or the Great Mosque of Lod, is a Friday mosque located in the city of Lod, (Note: Sometimes spelled as Lydd.) in central Israel.

The 15th-century mosque is built over part of a site that contained a former medieval church that was destroyed in the 12th century and rebuilt during the 19th-century as the Greek Orthodox Church of Saint George. The 19th-century church is located adjacent to the mosque. The former medieval church was allegedly erected over the tomb of the fourth-century martyr George of Lydda, who is frequently associated with the Muslim holy figure Al-Khadr.

== History ==
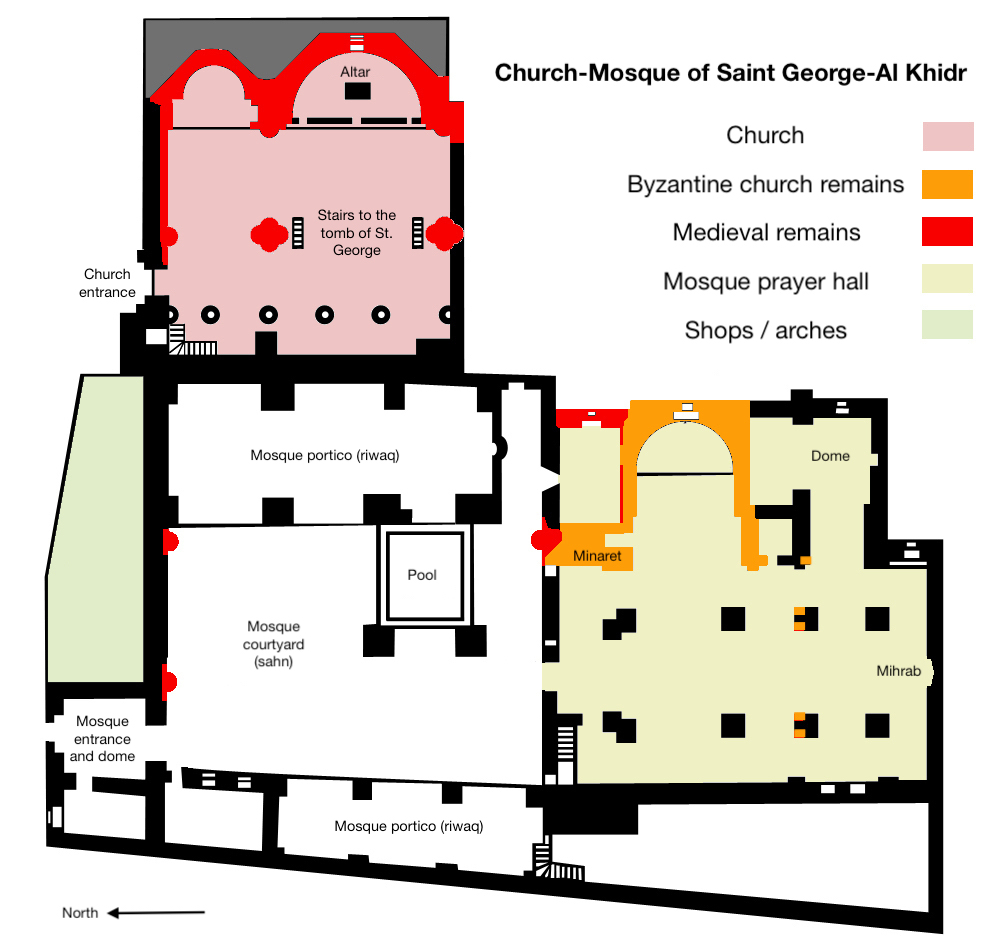
Annotated plan of the church-mosque, based upon a diagram by Charles Clermont-Ganneau

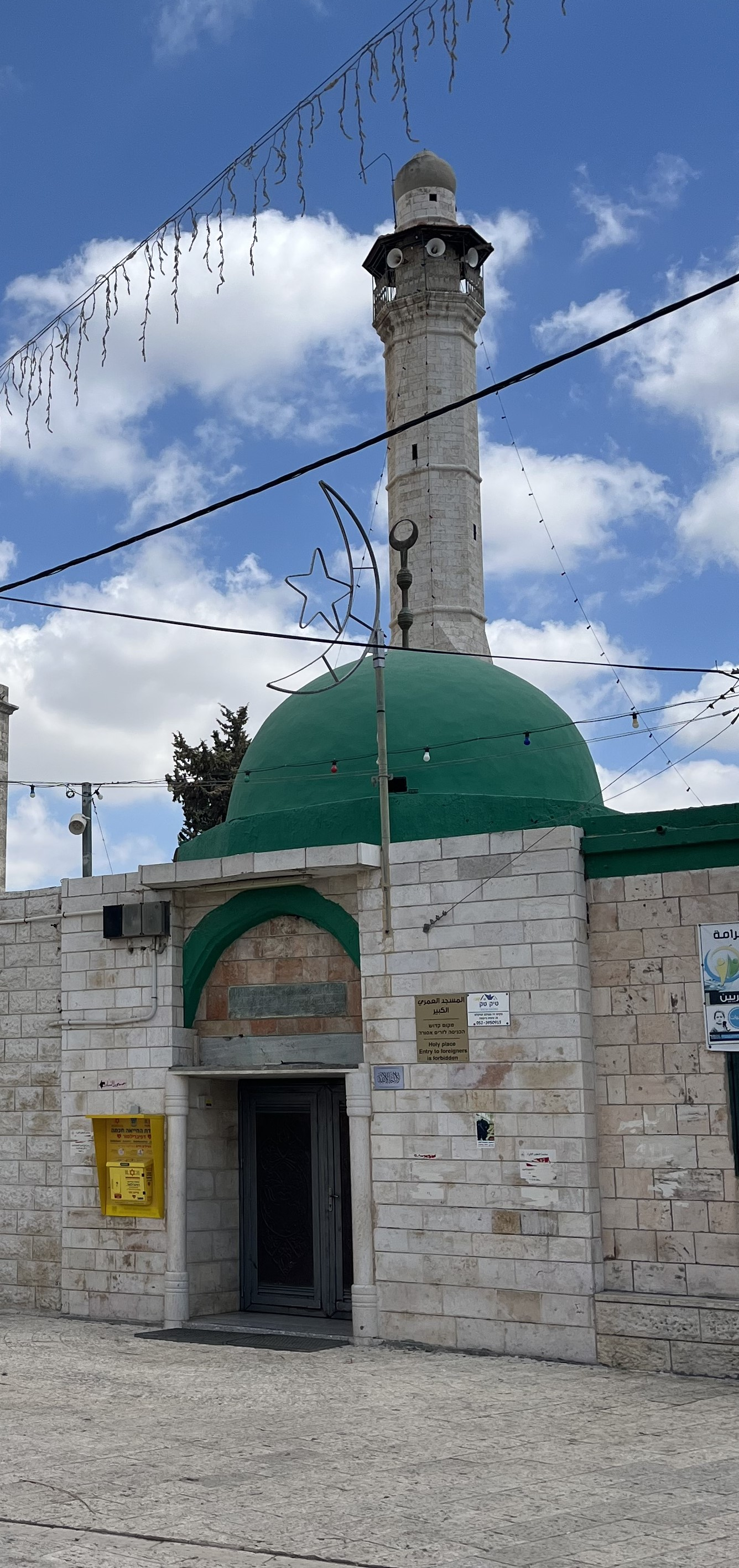
The exterior of the mosque in 2022

=== Byzantine establishment ===
The medieval church of Saint George was established in Lod by the Christian Byzantines, and was used for worship from the 5th-7th centuries. It was probably shaped as a basilica whose three aisles terminated at the east end in semi-circular apses. Beside the main basilica, the complex also contained a second, smaller church just southwest of it. The Byzantine site was destroyed in 614 CE by the Sasanids during the war which led to them conquering Jerusalem.

The Byzantine basilica may have had just one apse with two irregular pastophoria (chambers).

=== Crusader cathedral ===
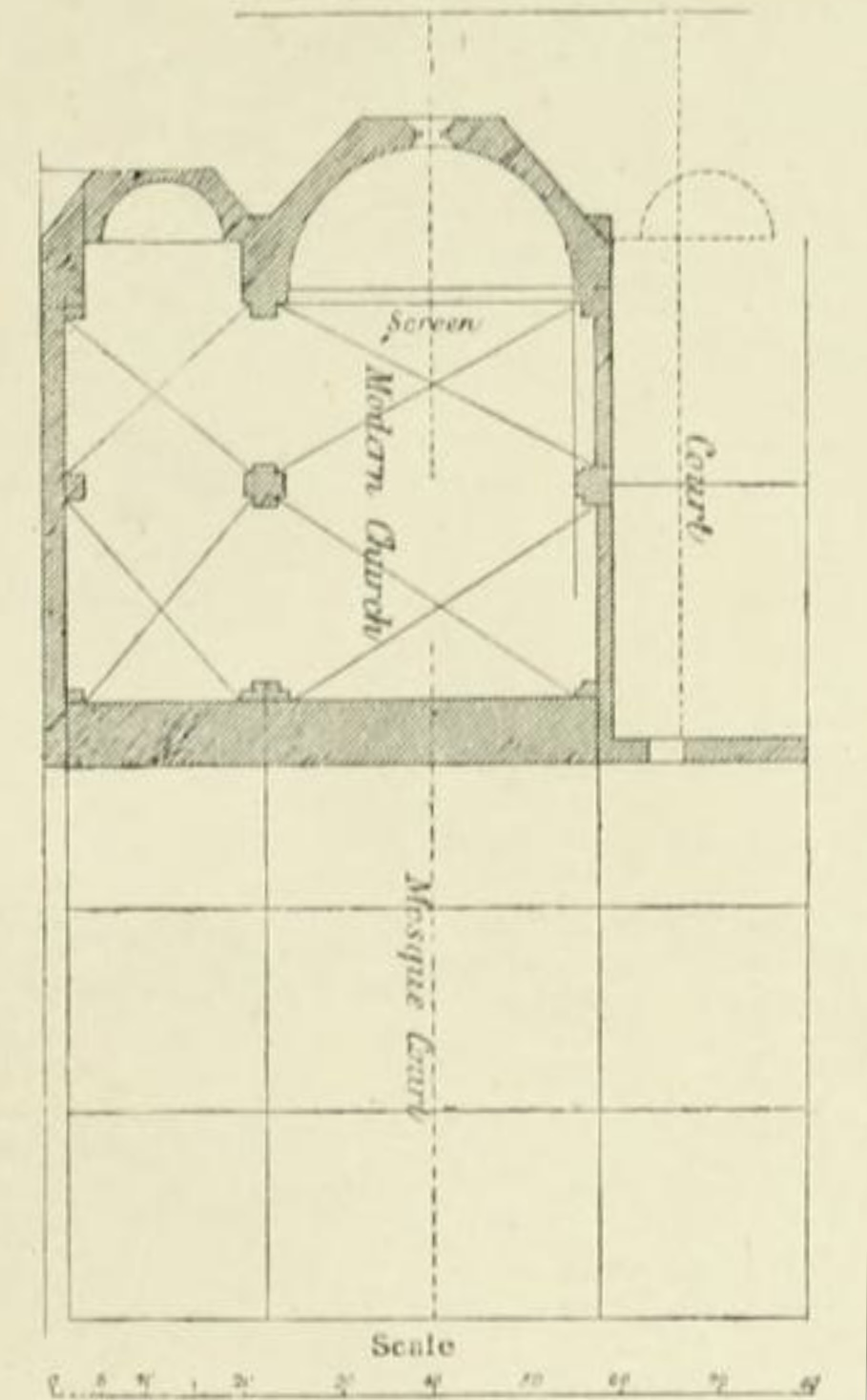
Original Crusader Church

The Crusaders established their cathedral at the exact site of the medieval Byzantine church, reusing some of its surviving masonry, and having the same internal measurements of 47 metres (154 ft) east to west, and 24 metres (79 ft) north to south. The three-aisled basilica also terminated in three semi-circular apses, with the second of five bays forming the transept. In 1177, a detachment of Saladin's army attacked the town and the inhabitants survived by taking refuge on the roof of the fortified church, which seems to indicate that by this time it had a stone roof.

After reconquering the land from the Crusaders in the aftermath of the 1187 Battle of Hattin, Saladin had the cathedral of Lydda and castle of Ramla demolished in 1191. The territory around Lydda changed hands repeatedly during the next eight decades, and the state of the church during this time is not clearly documented, with nothing to support the notion that it was rebuilt by Richard the Lionhearted. It seems that the Greek Orthodox continued using the still standing eastern part of the church, with the choir and the tomb of St George, possibly along with the smaller buildings southwest of the ruined cathedral. In 1266, Lydda fell to the Mamluk sultan Baibars. Clermont-Ganneau speculated that the Frankish materials present in secondary use at the nearby Jindas Bridge (1273) were taken from the demolished part of the Lydda church, which Adrian Boas sees as part of the wider Mamluk custom of marking the triumph over the Christians by recycling their masonry for their own constructions.

=== Mamluk mosque ===
During the Mamluk period, the ruined western part of the Crusader church was converted into a congregational mosque, the earliest mention of which comes from the early 15th century. The remains of the smaller Byzantine basilica southwest of the main church, including its apse, were incorporated into the mosque's prayer hall; today a pillar that once stood in the nave of the basilica remains inside the mosque prayer hall with an inscription in Greek. Above the entrance to the mosque is an inscription dating its construction to June 1269 (Ramadan 667 AH), as instructed by Baibars.

The northern façade of the mosque building faces the sahn, and makes use of the south wall of the Crusader church. The mosque is built as a hall divided into three by two rows of four pillars each. Its ceiling is vaulted and made in the shape of a cross. On the eastern side of the prayer hall remains a remnant of a Byzantine apse. Beneath the mosque are underground halls, built by the Crusaders and used as reservoirs for the church and city residents. Felix Fabri mentioned the mosque and minaret in the 1480s:

"The rest of the church has been cut off from the choir by a wall, and they have made that part of it into a fair mosque in honour of Mahomet, and adorned it with a lofty tower. The door stood over against us, so that we could see into the courtyard of the mosque, and into the mosque itself, and it was like Paradise for cleanliness and beauty."

— The Book of the Wanderings of Brother Felix Fabri, Felix Fabri, c. 1481.

In the Ottoman period, the entrance to the courtyard of the mosque was located on its western wall, but it was later moved to its northern side.

=== 19th-century church ===
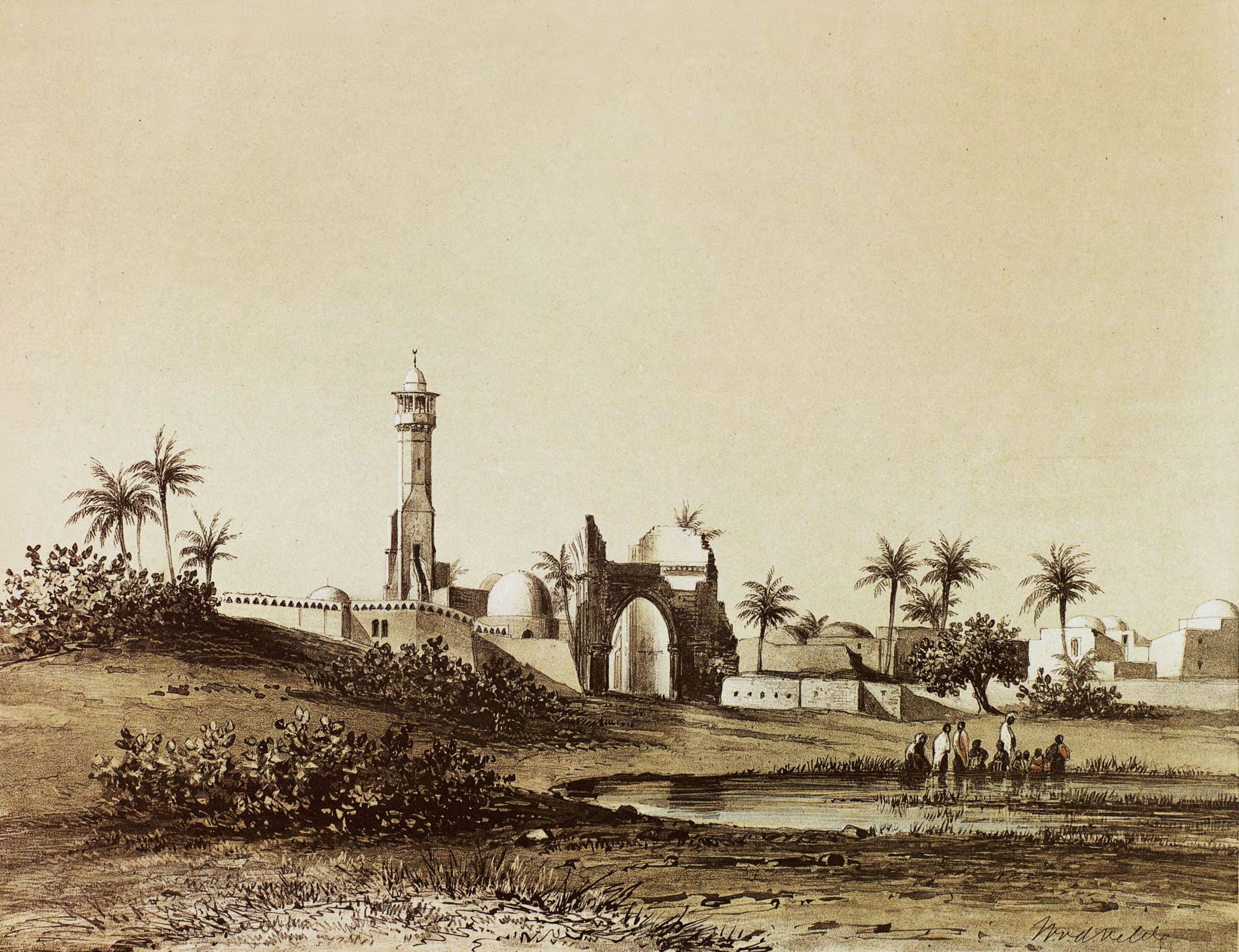
Drawing of the site prior to rebuilding by Charles William Meredith van de Velde

The current Church of Saint George incorporates only the northeast corner of the original site. During the second part of the nineteenth century, the Greek Orthodox Patriarchate of Jerusalem received permission from the Ottoman authorities to build a church on the site of the medieval ruins. The 19th-century church was built over the remains of the 12th-century Crusader structure, occupying the east end of its nave and northern aisle, from which the corresponding two apses survive.

The Ottoman authorities stipulated that part of the church plot be incorporated in the mosque courtyard. The southern part of the Crusader church dictated the shape of the mosque courtyard.

The church crypt contains a sarcophagus venerated as the tomb of Saint George.

== Gallery ==
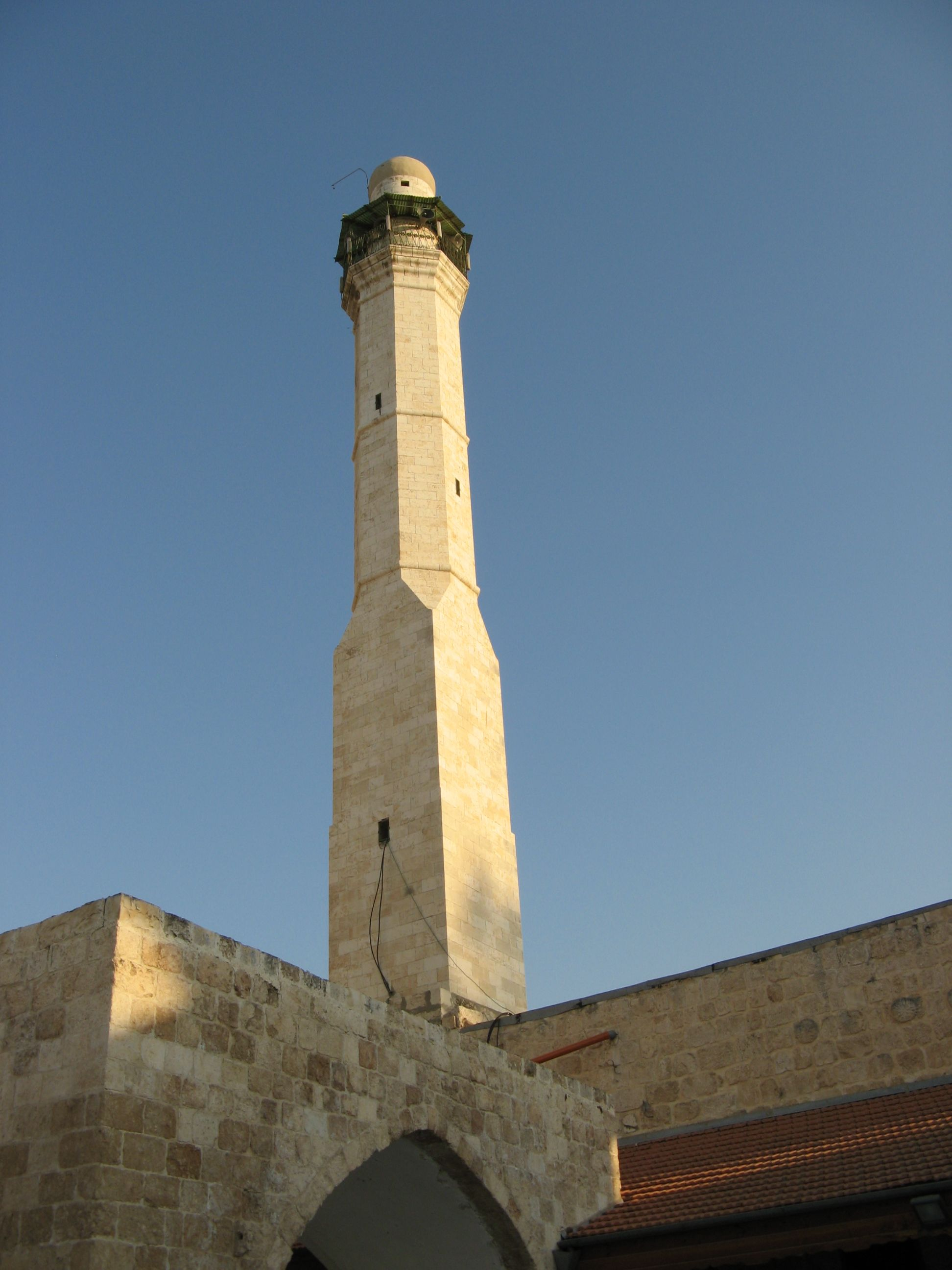
The mosque's minaret

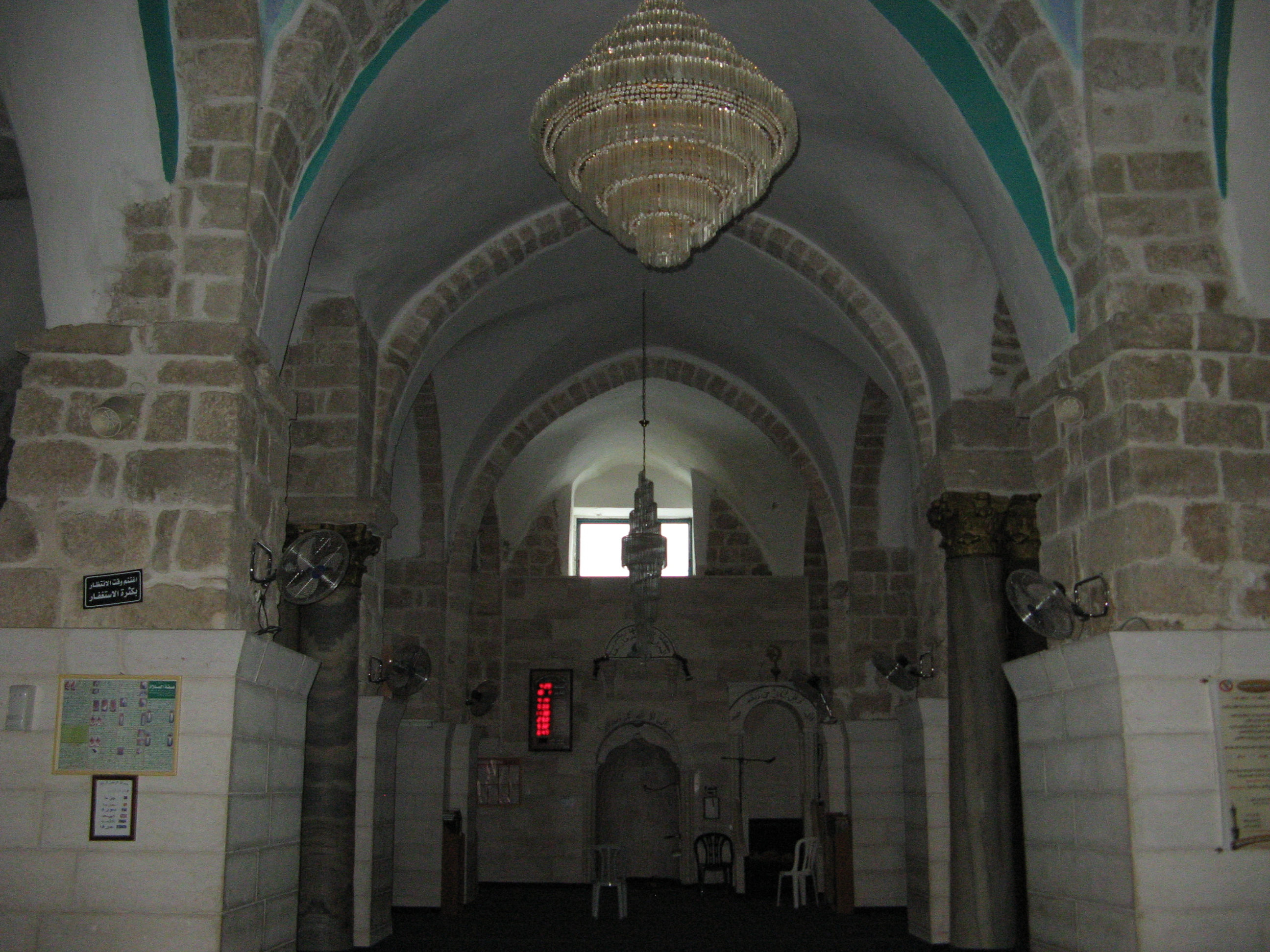
Interior of the prayer hall, including mihrab

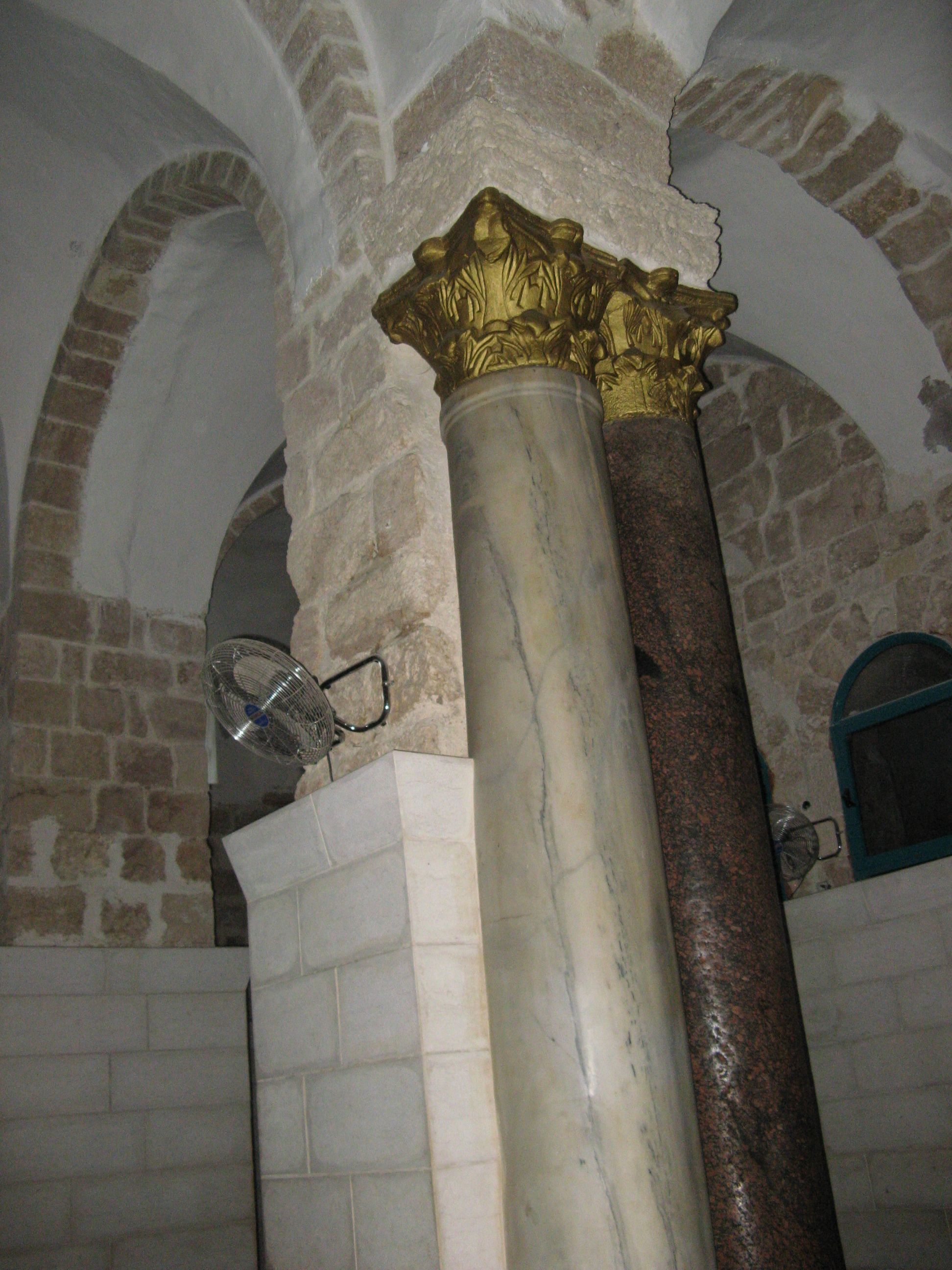
Pillars showing Byzantine remains above

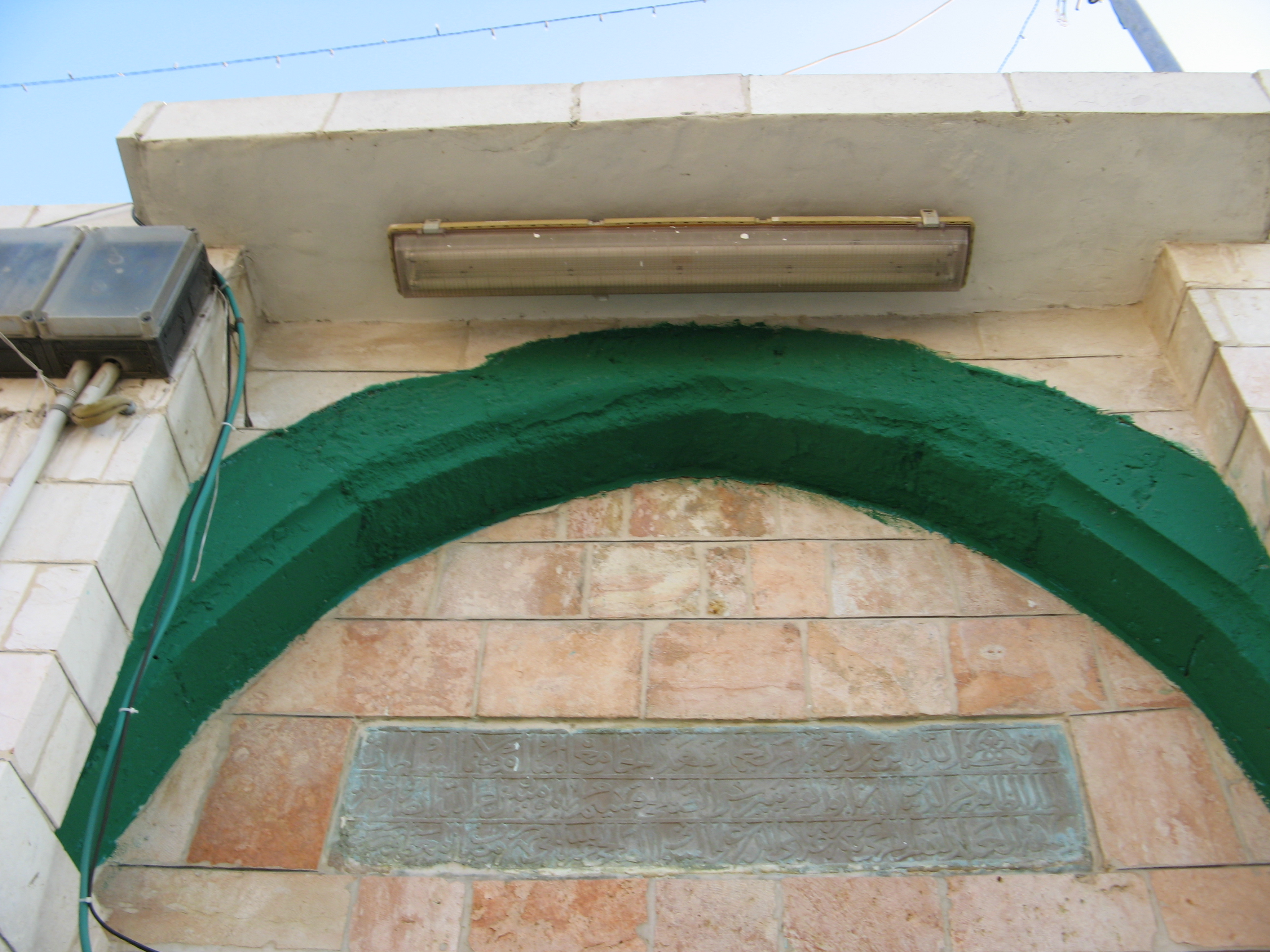
Inscription at mosque entrance

=== Historical ===
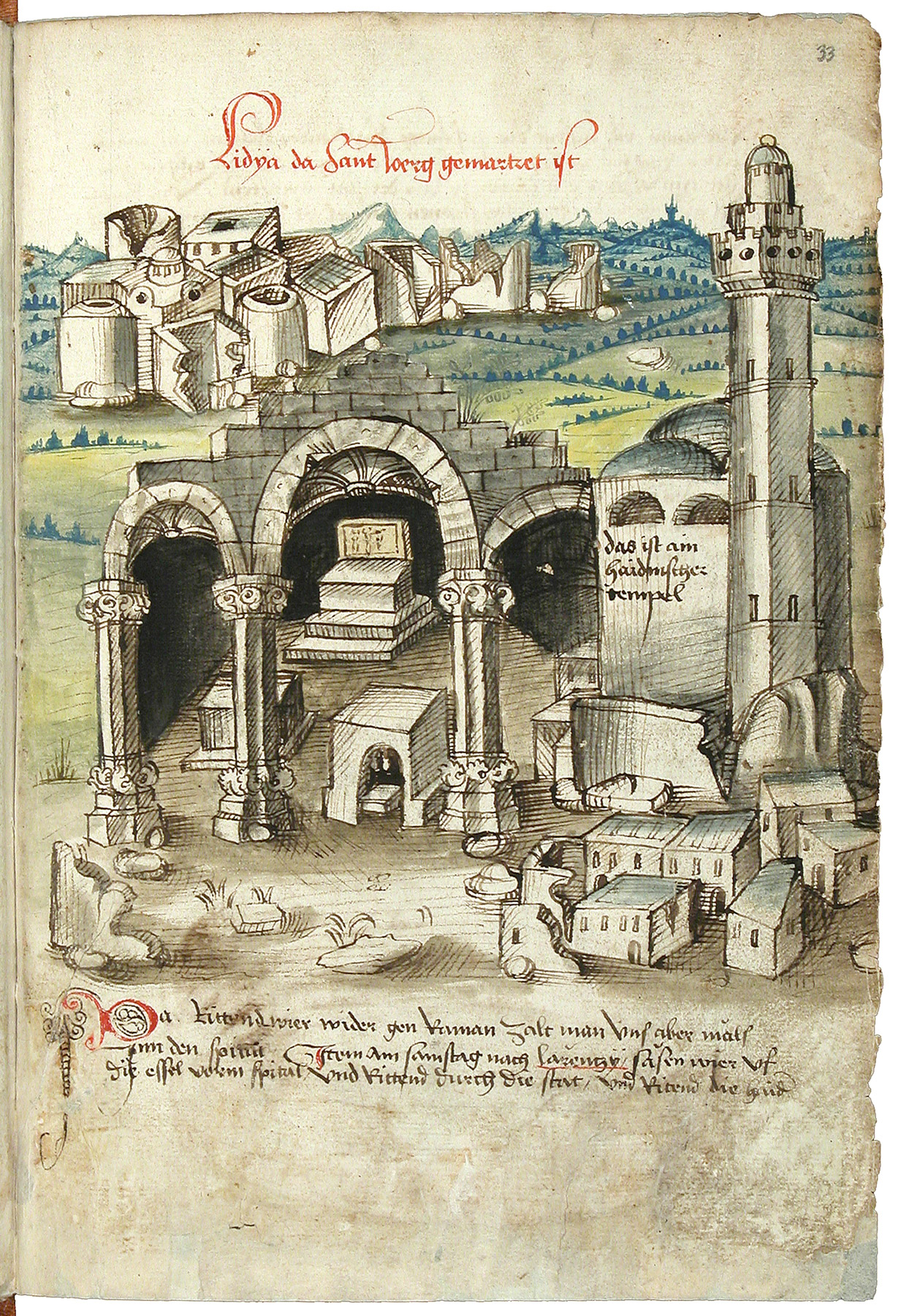
1487 drawing of ruined church over St George's tomb and Mosque by Konrad von Grünenberg

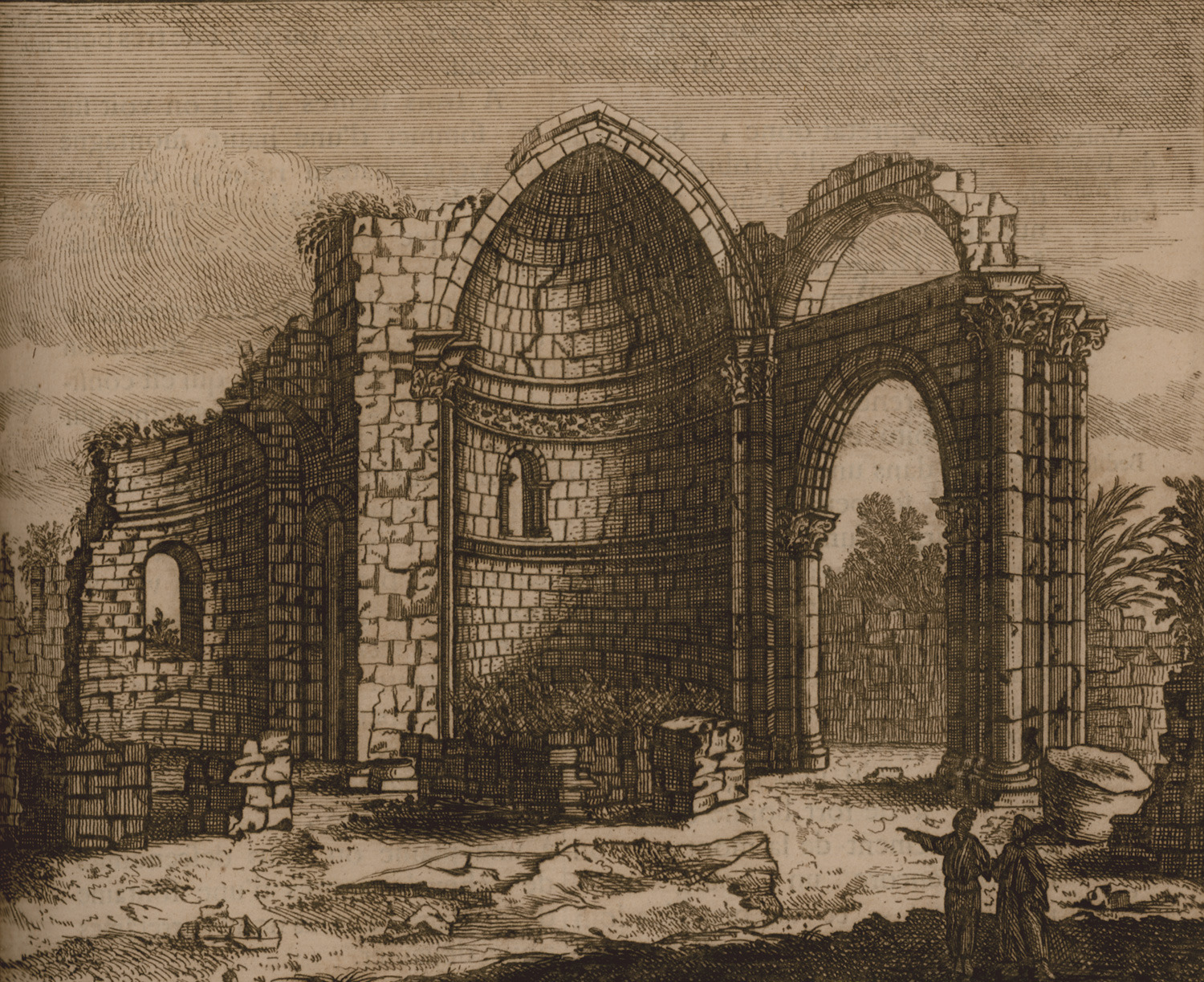
1714 drawing of ruined church over St George's tomb by Cornelis de Bruijn

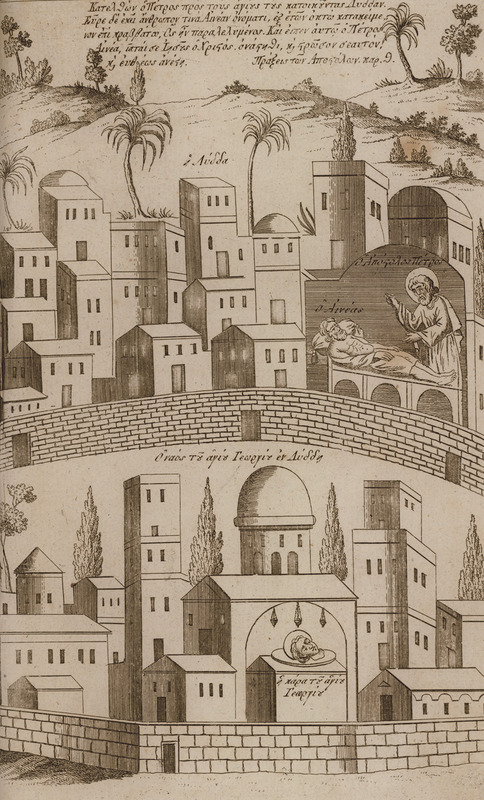
1807

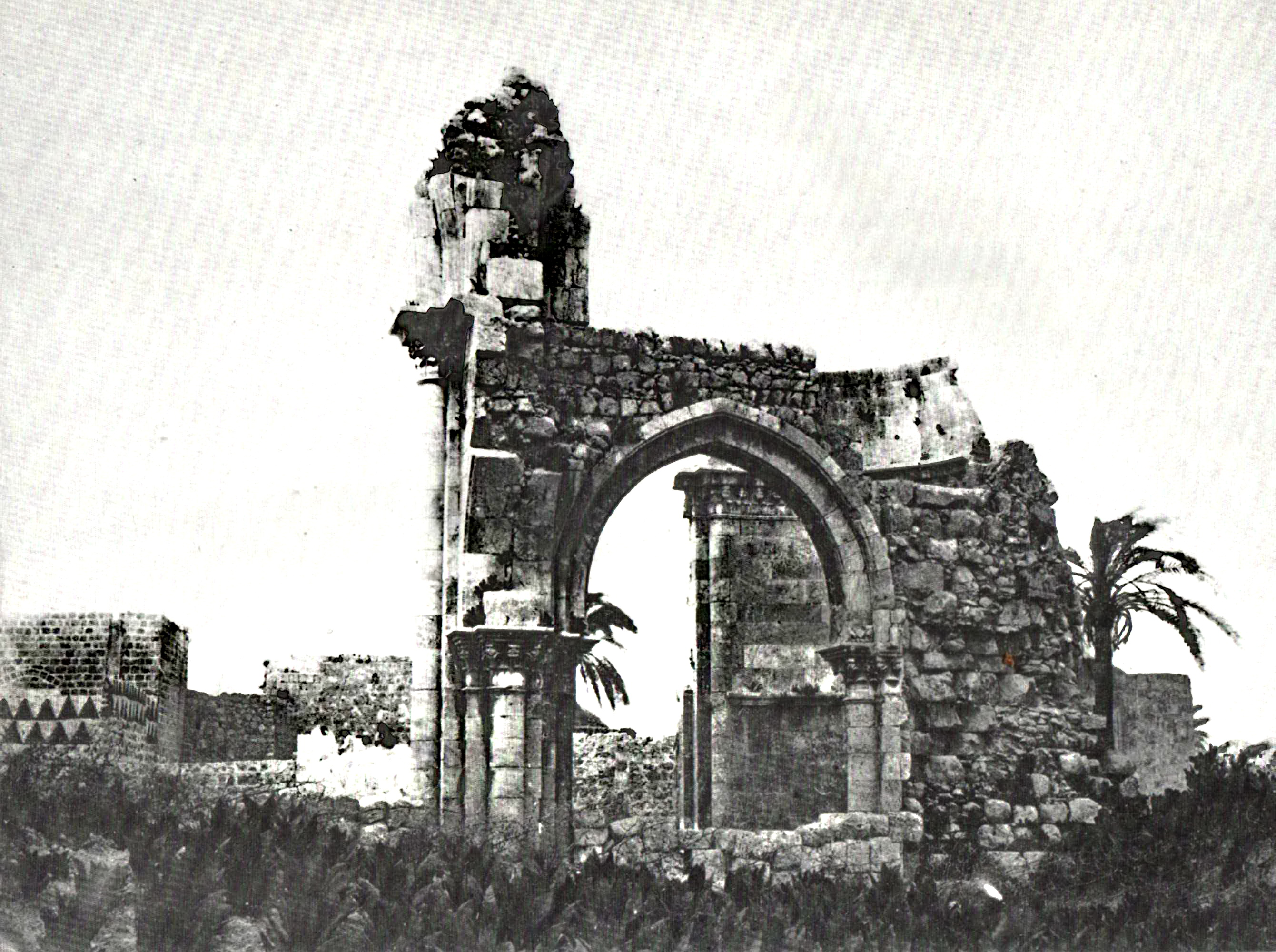
1866 (east end ruins, viewed from the south)

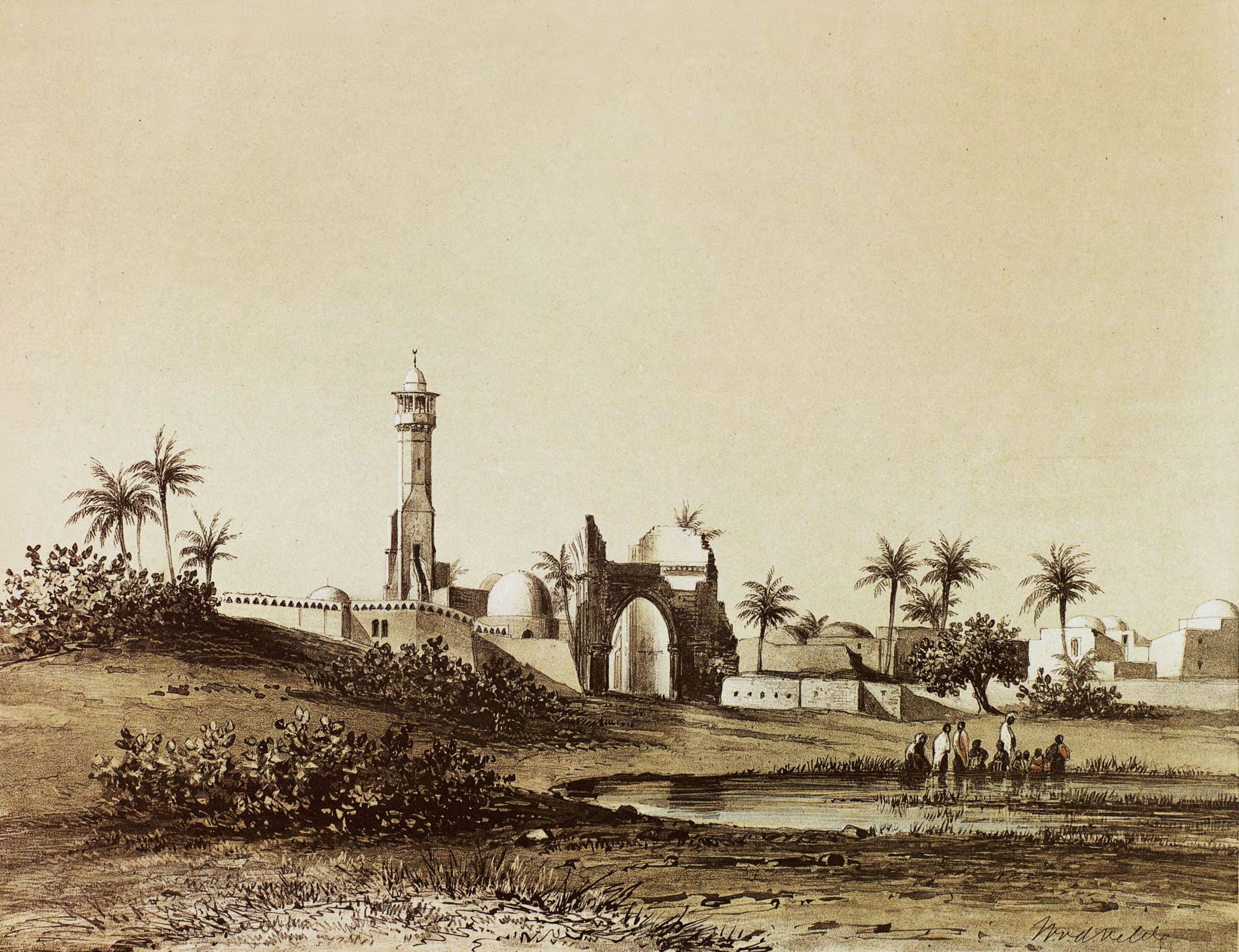
1857

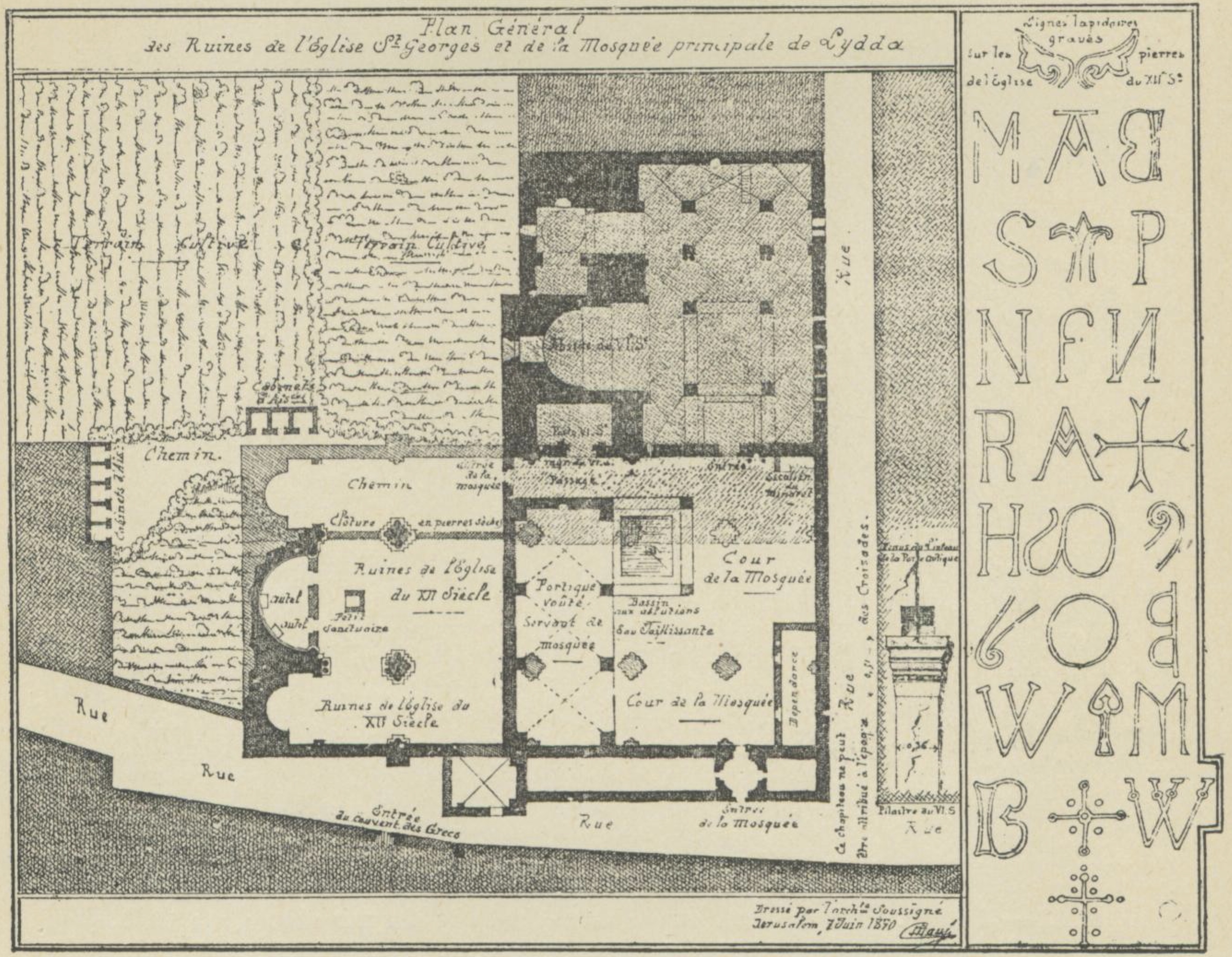
1870

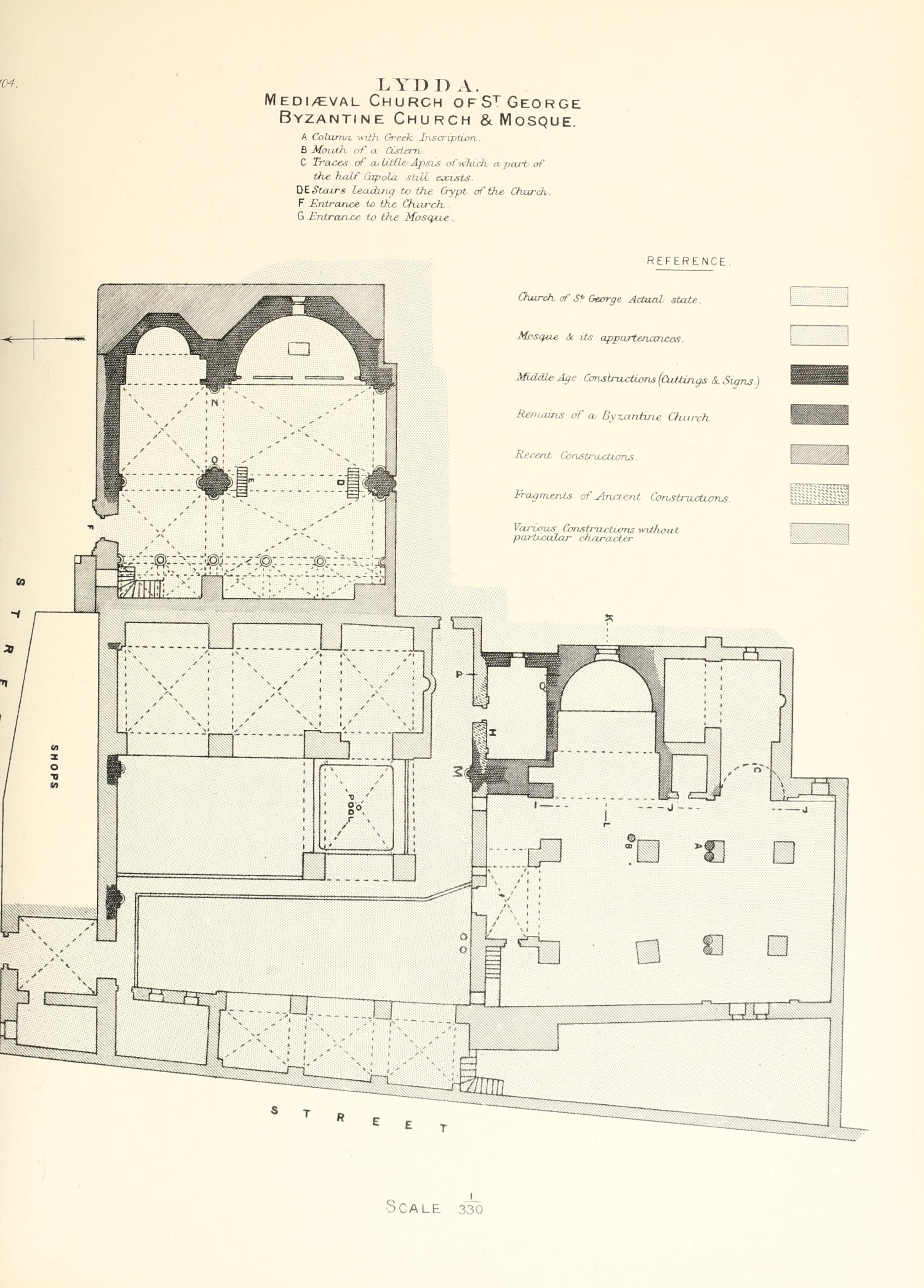
1873-74

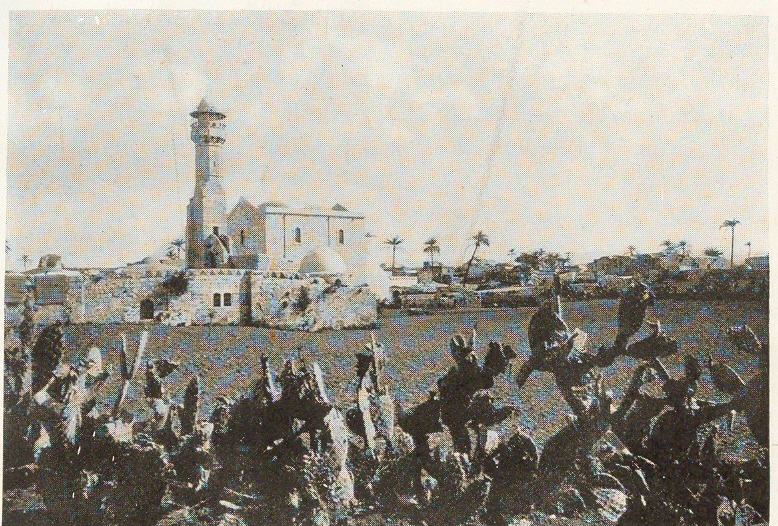
1910

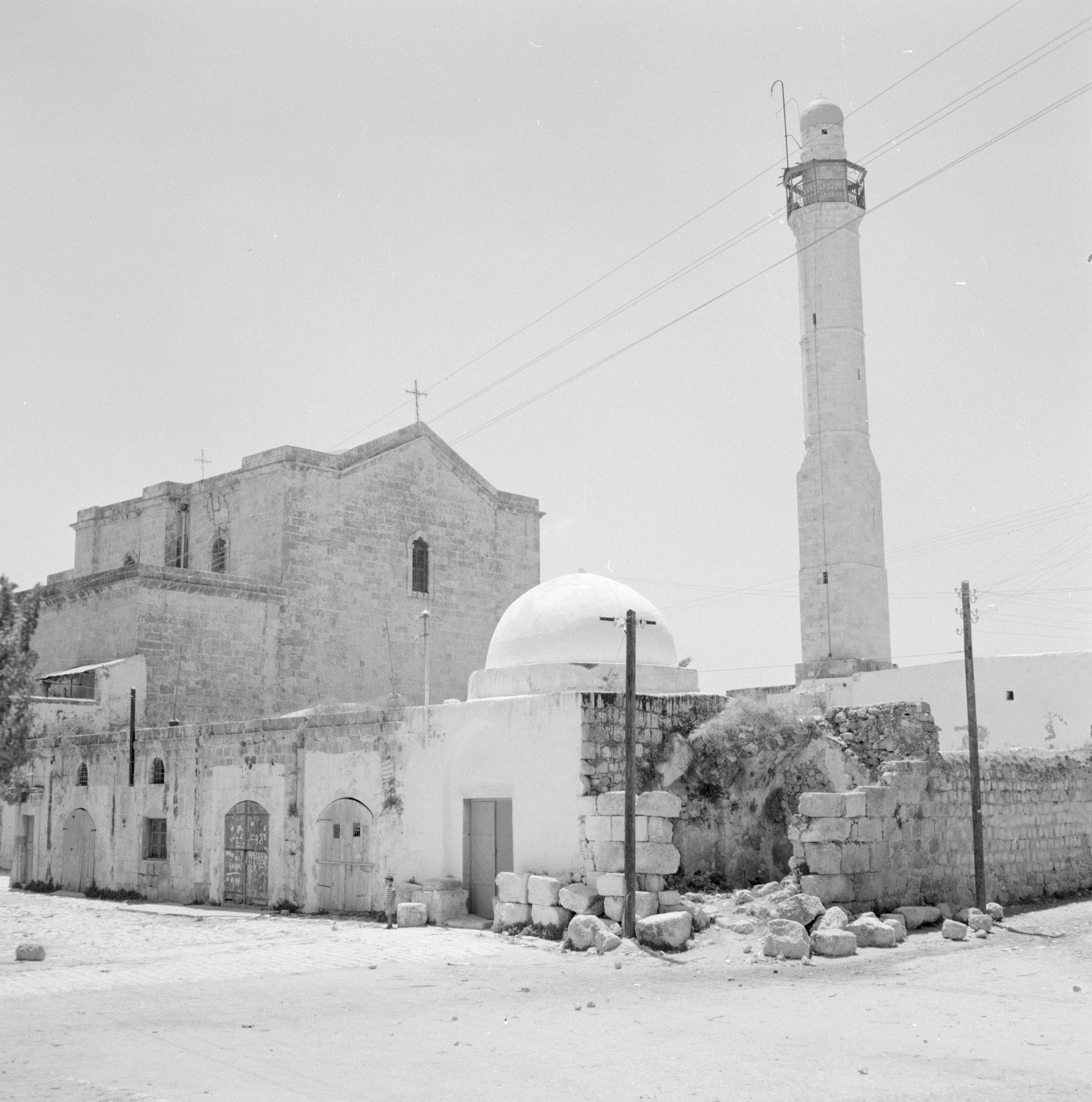
1948-49

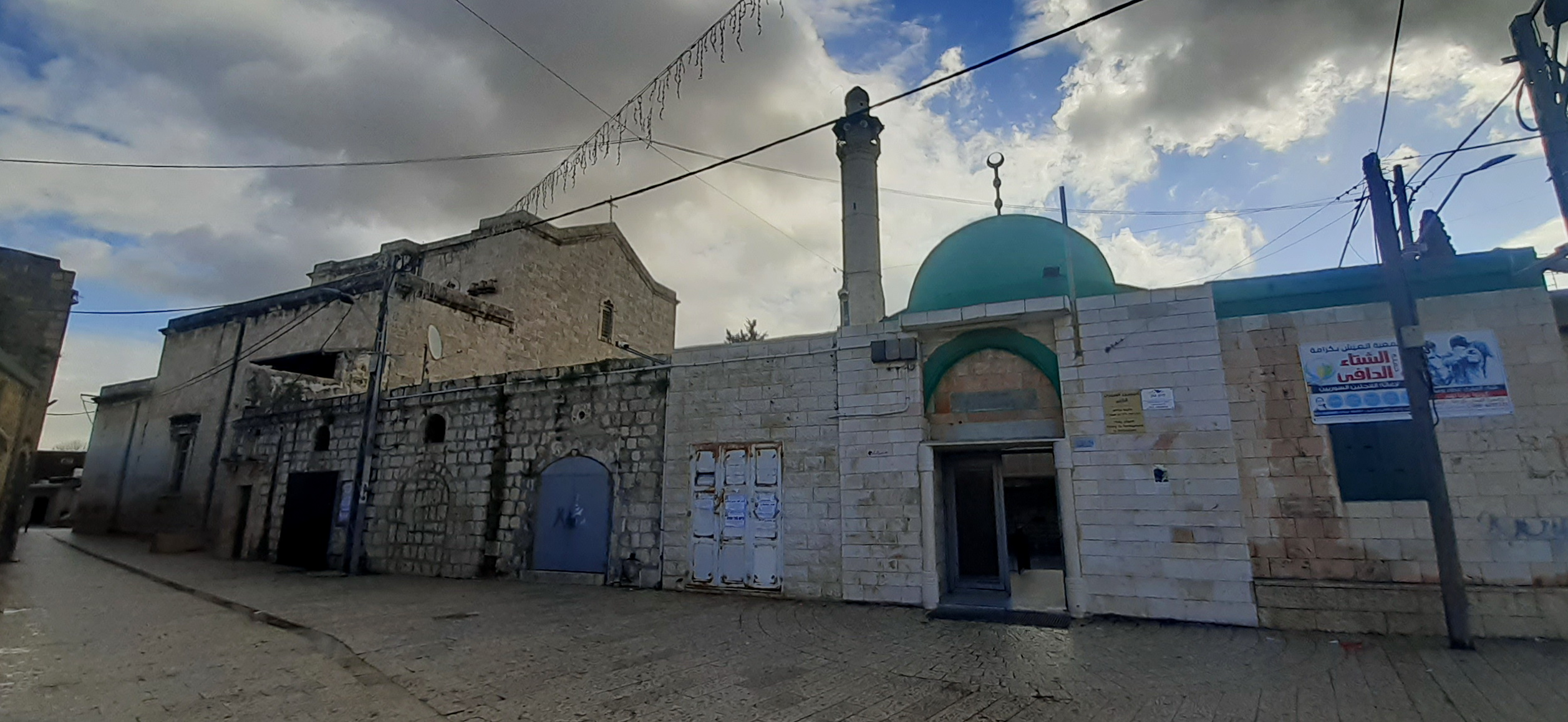
2022

== See also ==
- Islam in Israel
- List of mosques in Israel
- Saint George in devotions, traditions and prayers
- St. George's Cathedral, Jerusalem, an Anglican church in East Jerusalem
- Monastery of Saint George, al-Khader, a Greek Orthodox monastery near Bethlehem
- Religion in Israel
