= Church of Saint George (Lod) =

19th-century church in Israel

- כנסיית גאורגיוס הקדוש קוטל הדרקון
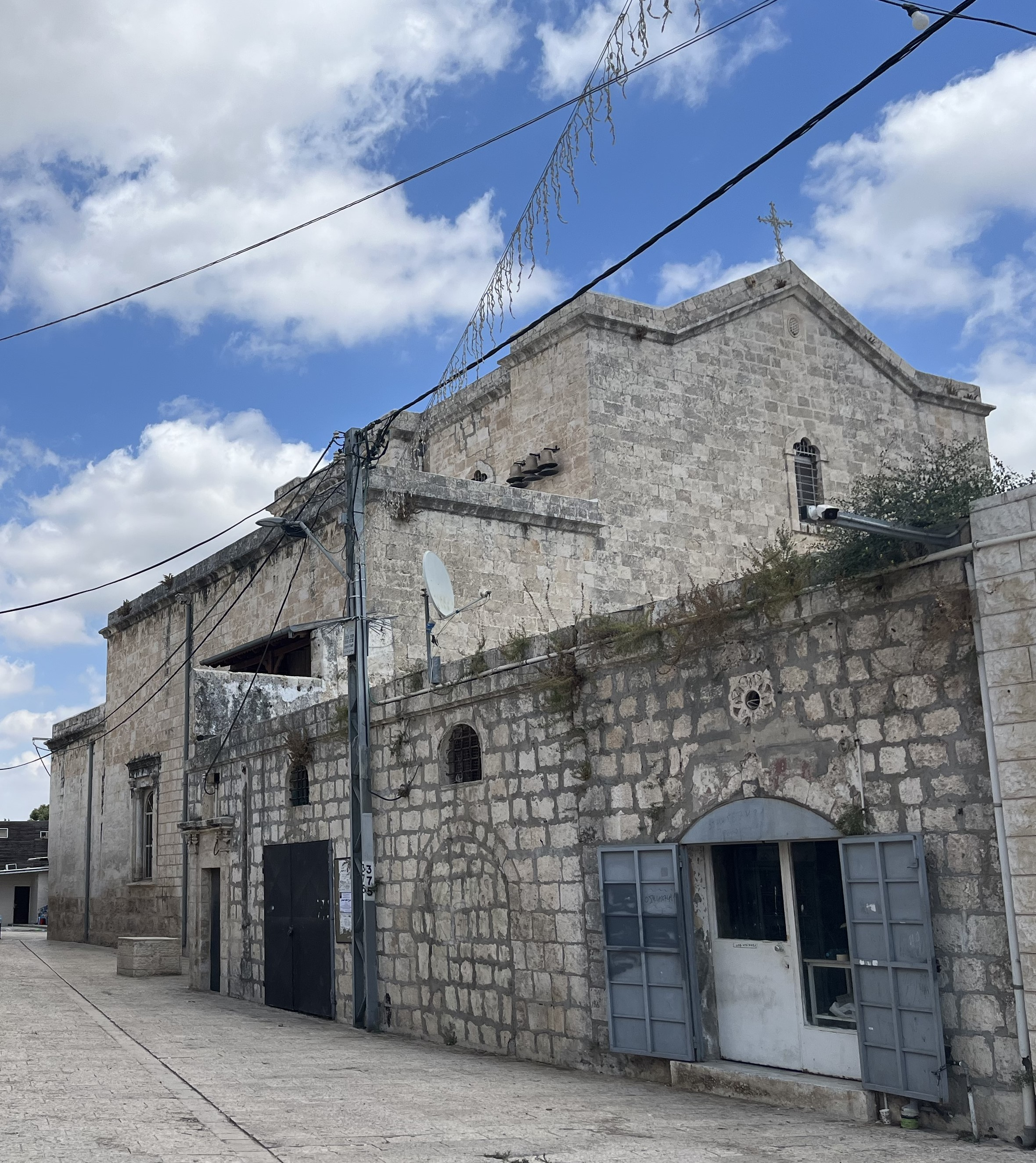
- Church of Saint George
- 31°57′10.8″N 34°53′58.15″E
- Address: Lod
- Country: Israel
- Denomination: Greek Orthodox

History
- Status: Church
- Dedication: Saint George

Architecture
- Architectural type: Church
- Style: Byzantine; Ottoman
- Completed: 5th century AD (Byzantine); 1872 AD (Ottoman)
- Demolished: 1191 AD (rebuilt)

Administration
- Diocese: Greek Orthodox Patriarchate of Jerusalem

The Church of Saint George (Hebrew: כנסיית גאורגיוס הקדוש קוטל הדרקון, lit. 'Church of Saint George the dragonslayer'; Arabic: كنيسة القديس جيورجوس or كنيسة مار جريس) is a Greek Orthodox church, located in the city of Lod, Israel. The church contains a sarcophagus venerated as the tomb of the fourth-century Christian martyr Saint George.

The 19th-century church is located adjacent to the 15th-century Great Mosque of Lod. The original site containing both the church and the mosque was a former medieval church that was destroyed in the 12th century; and rebuilt during the Crusader period.

== History ==
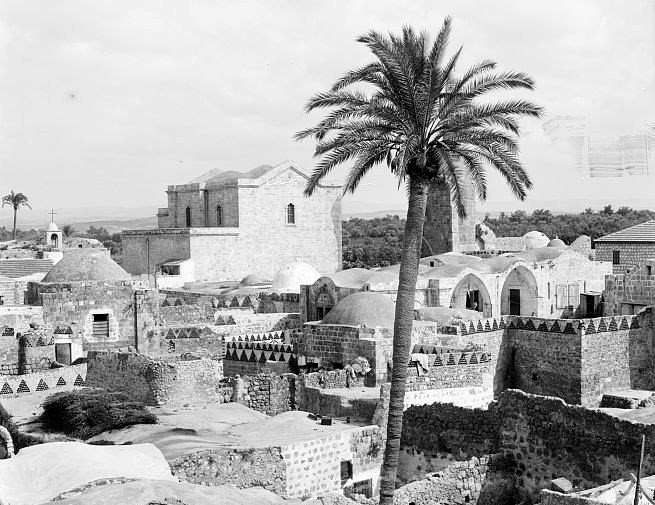
The church in c. 1920

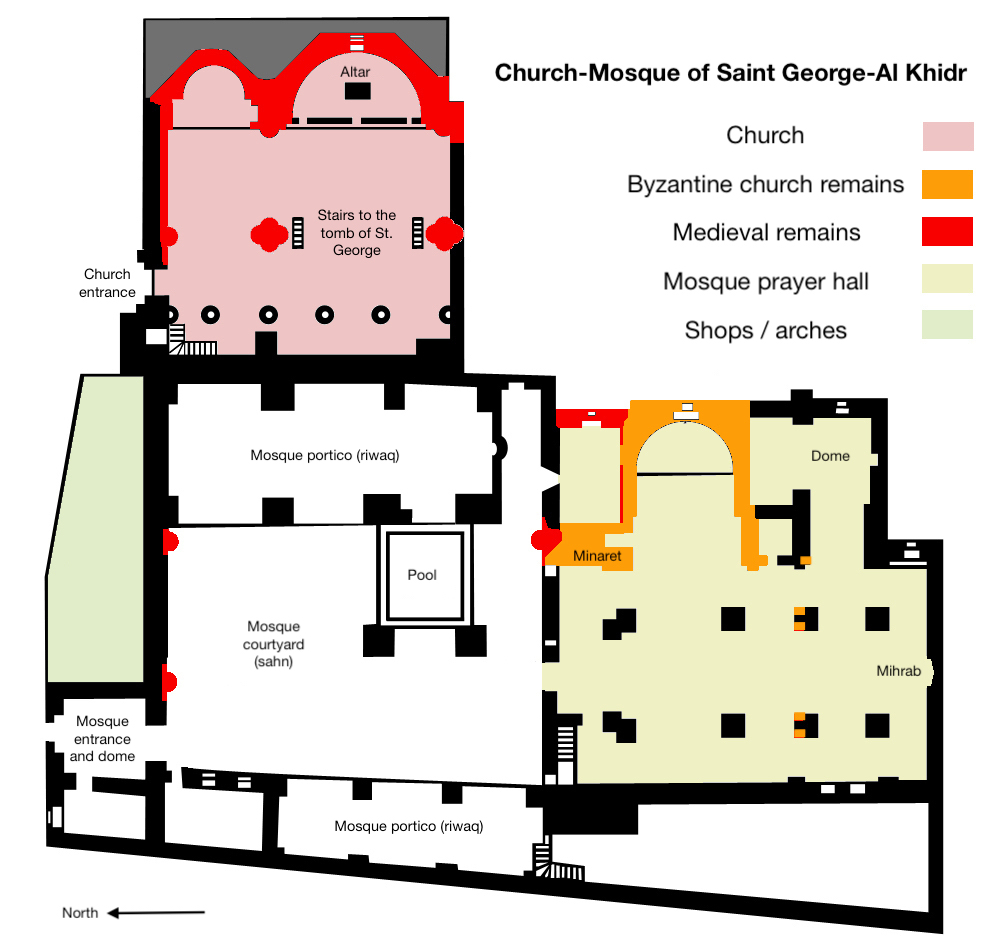
Annotated plan of the church-mosque, based upon a diagram by Charles Clermont-Ganneau

=== Byzantine establishment ===
The church of Saint George was first established in Lod by the Byzantines and stood in the 5th-7th centuries. It was probably shaped as a basilica whose three aisles terminated at the east end in semi-circular apses. Beside the basilica, the complex also contained a second, smaller church, to its southwest. The Christian site was destroyed in 614 by the Sasanids during the war which led to them conquering Jerusalem.

The Byzantine basilica may have had just one apse with two irregular pastophoria (chambers).

=== Crusader cathedral ===
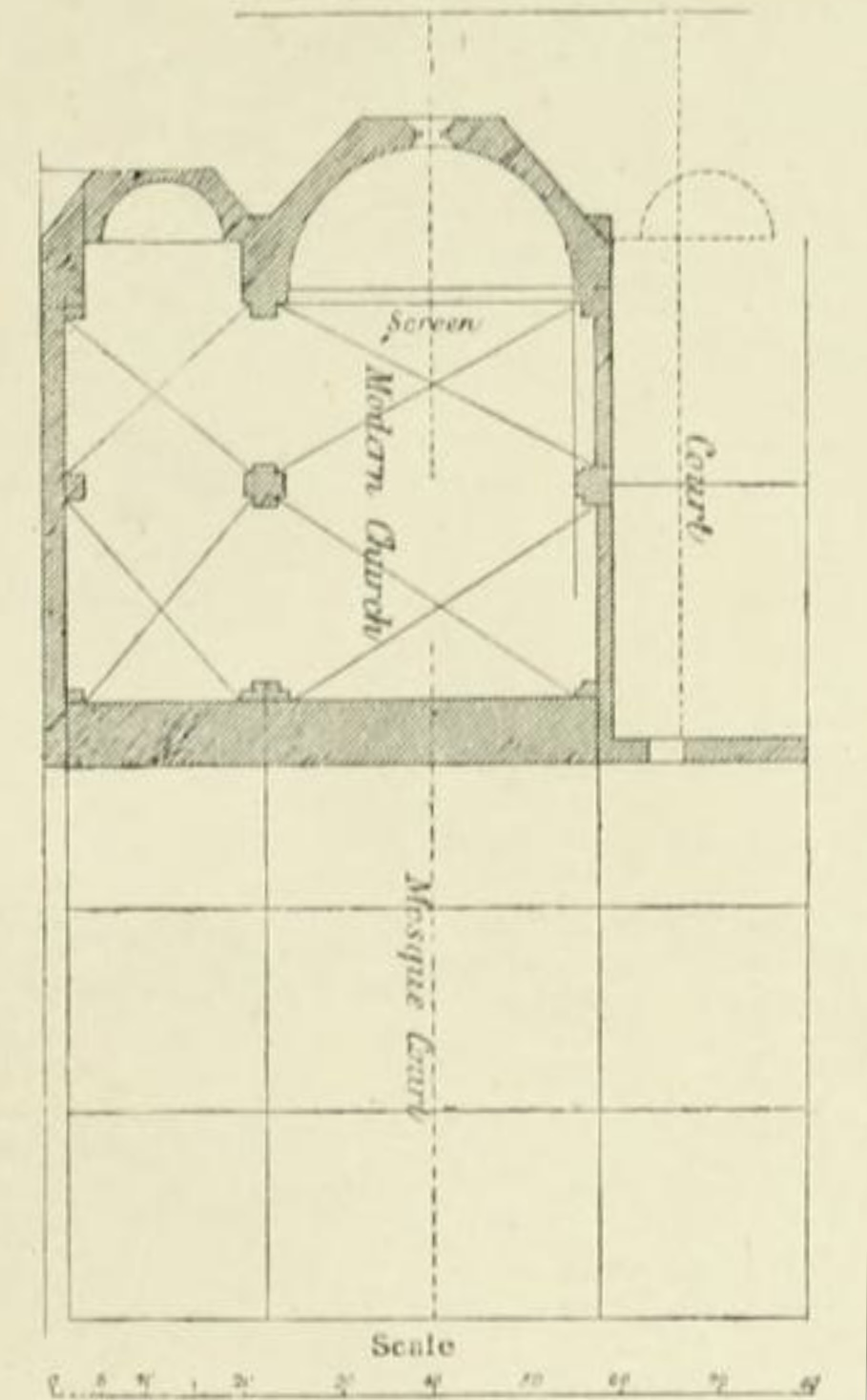
Original Crusader Church

The Crusaders established their cathedral at the exact site of the medieval Byzantine church, reusing some of its surviving masonry, and having the same internal measurements of 47 metres (154 ft) east to west, and 24 metres (79 ft) north to south. The three-aisled basilica also terminated in three semi-circular apses, with the second of five bays forming the transept. In 1177, a detachment of Saladin's army attacked the town and the inhabitants survived by taking refuge on the roof of the fortified church, which seems to indicate that by this time it had a stone roof.

After reconquering the land from the Crusaders in the aftermath of the 1187 Battle of Hattin, Saladin had the cathedral of Lydda and castle of Ramla demolished in 1191. The territory around Lydda changed hands repeatedly during the next eight decades, and the state of the church during this time is not clearly documented, with nothing to support the notion that it was rebuilt by Richard the Lionhearted. It seems that the Greek Orthodox continued using the still standing eastern part of the church, with the choir and the tomb of St George, possibly along with the smaller buildings southwest of the ruined cathedral. In 1266, Lydda fell to the Mamluk sultan Baibars. Clermont-Ganneau speculated that the Frankish materials present in secondary use at the nearby Jindas Bridge (1273) were taken from the demolished part of the Lydda church, which Adrian Boas sees as part of the wider Mamluk custom of marking the triumph over the Christians by recycling their masonry for their own constructions.

=== Mamluk mosque ===
During the Mamluk period, the ruined western part of the Crusader church was converted into a congregational mosque, the earliest mention of which comes from the early 15th century. The remains of the smaller Byzantine basilica southwest of the main church, including its apse, were incorporated into the mosque's prayer hall; today a pillar that once stood in the nave of the basilica remains inside the mosque prayer hall with an inscription in Greek. Above the entrance to the mosque is an inscription dating its construction to June 1269 (Ramadan 667 AH), as instructed by Baibars.

The northern façade of the mosque building faces the sahn, and makes use of the south wall of the Crusader church. The mosque is built as a hall divided into three by two rows of four pillars each. Its ceiling is vaulted and made in the shape of a cross. On the eastern side of the prayer hall remains a remnant of a Byzantine apse. Beneath the mosque are underground halls, built by the Crusaders and used as reservoirs for the church and city residents. Felix Fabri mentioned the mosque and minaret in the 1480s:

"The rest of the church has been cut off from the choir by a wall, and they have made that part of it into a fair mosque in honour of Mahomet, and adorned it with a lofty tower. The door stood over against us, so that we could see into the courtyard of the mosque, and into the mosque itself, and it was like Paradise for cleanliness and beauty."

— The Book of the Wanderings of Brother Felix Fabri, Felix Fabri, c. 1481.

=== 19th-century church ===
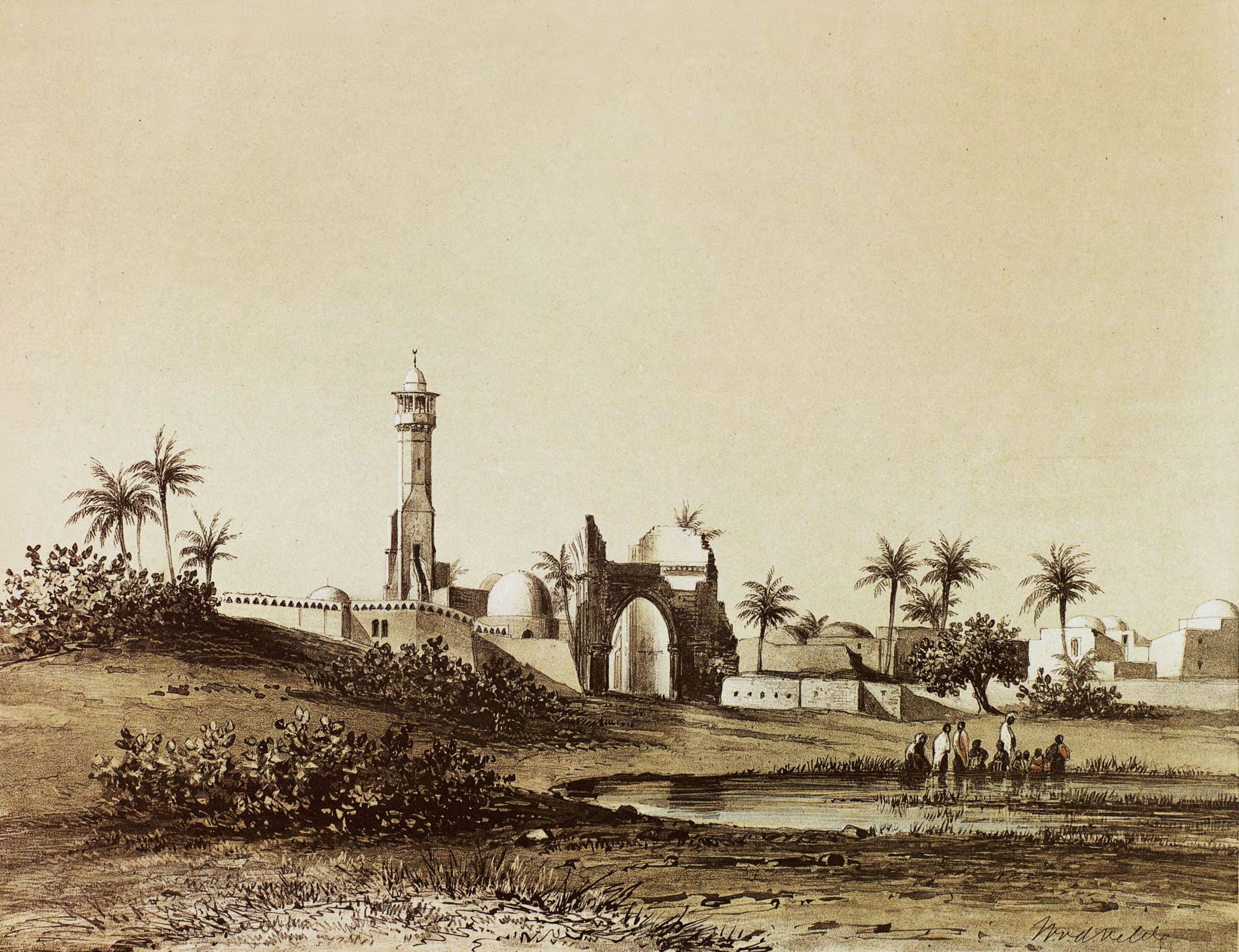
Drawing of the site prior to rebuilding by Charles William Meredith van de Velde

The current Church of St. George incorporates only the northeast corner of the original site. During the second part of the nineteenth century, the Greek Orthodox Patriarchate of Jerusalem received permission from the Ottoman authorities to build a church on the site of the medieval ruins. The 19th-century church was built over the remains of the 12th-century Crusader structure, occupying the east end of its nave and northern aisle, from which the corresponding two apses survive.

The Ottoman authorities stipulated that part of the church plot be incorporated in the mosque courtyard. The southern part of the Crusader church dictated the shape of the mosque courtyard.. During the rebuilding under the Ottomans, the Munayer and Habash families helped the church by donating money and resources to cover the costs..

The church crypt contains a sarcophagus venerated as a symbolic tomb of St George.

== Gallery ==
=== Combined site ===
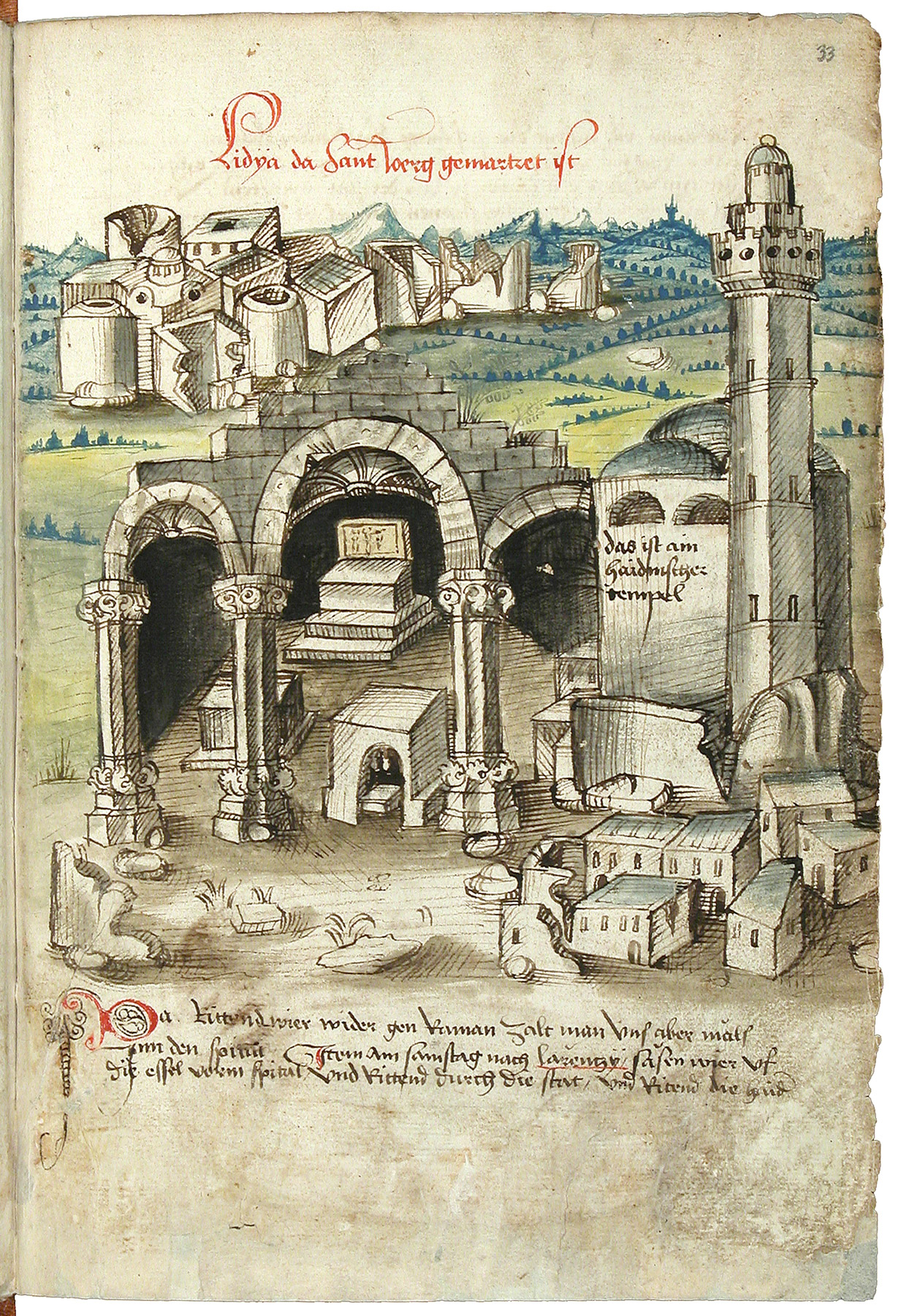
1487 drawing of ruined church over St George's tomb and Mosque by Konrad von Grünenberg

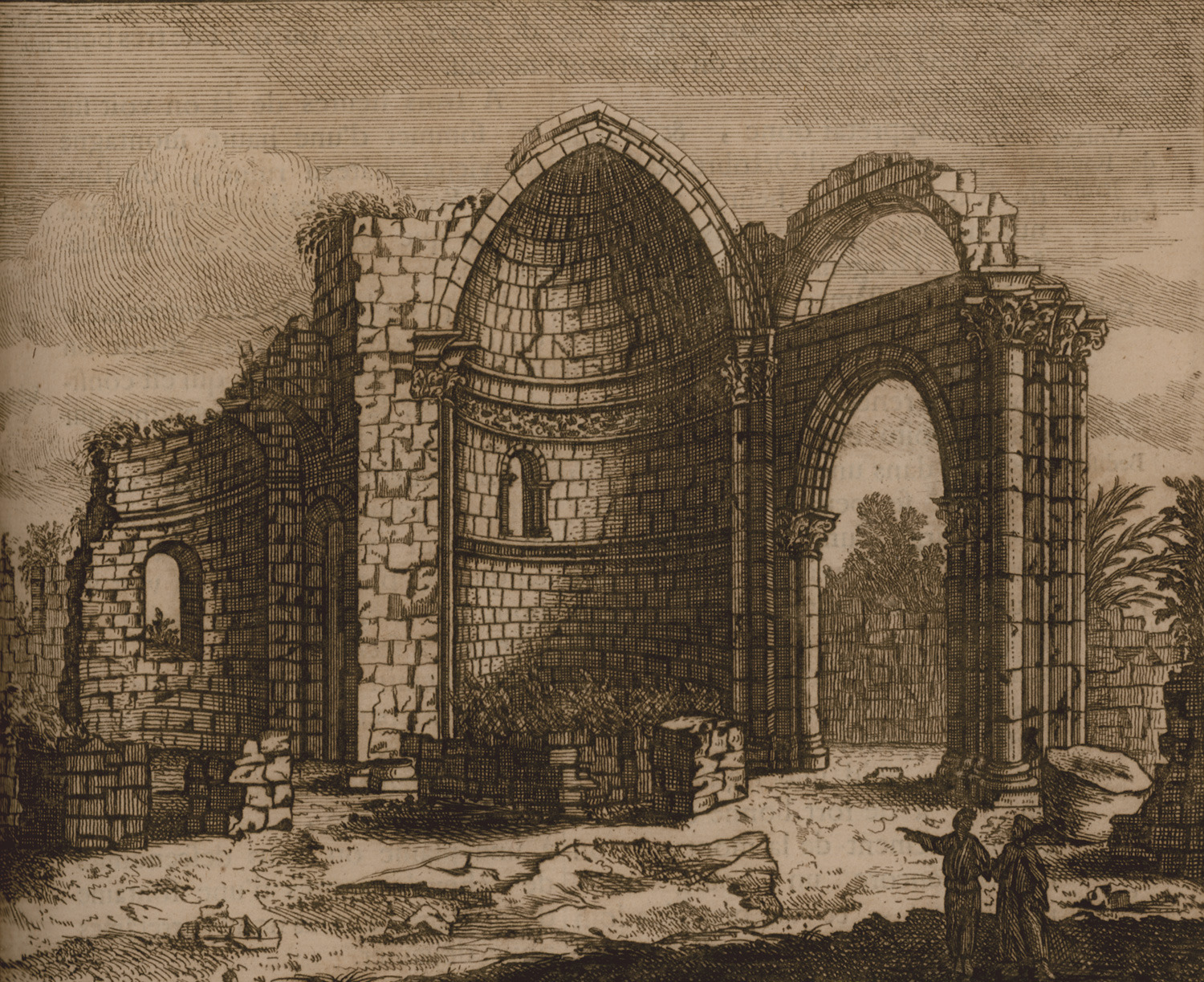
1714 drawing of ruined church over St George's tomb by Cornelis de Bruijn

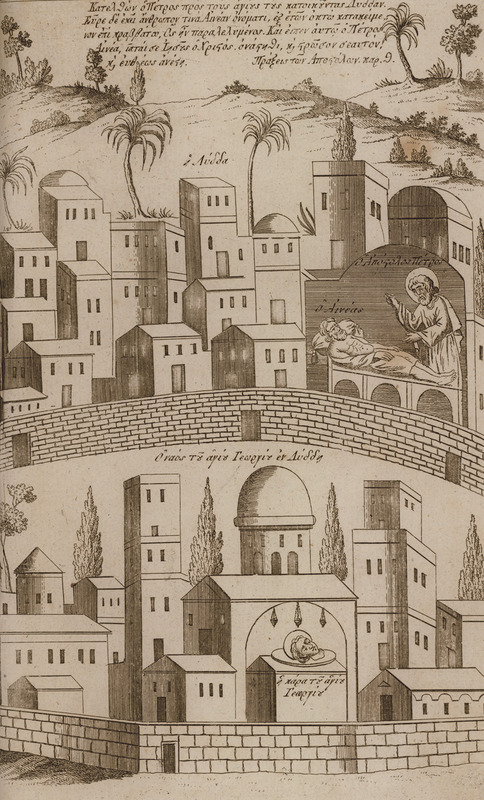
1807

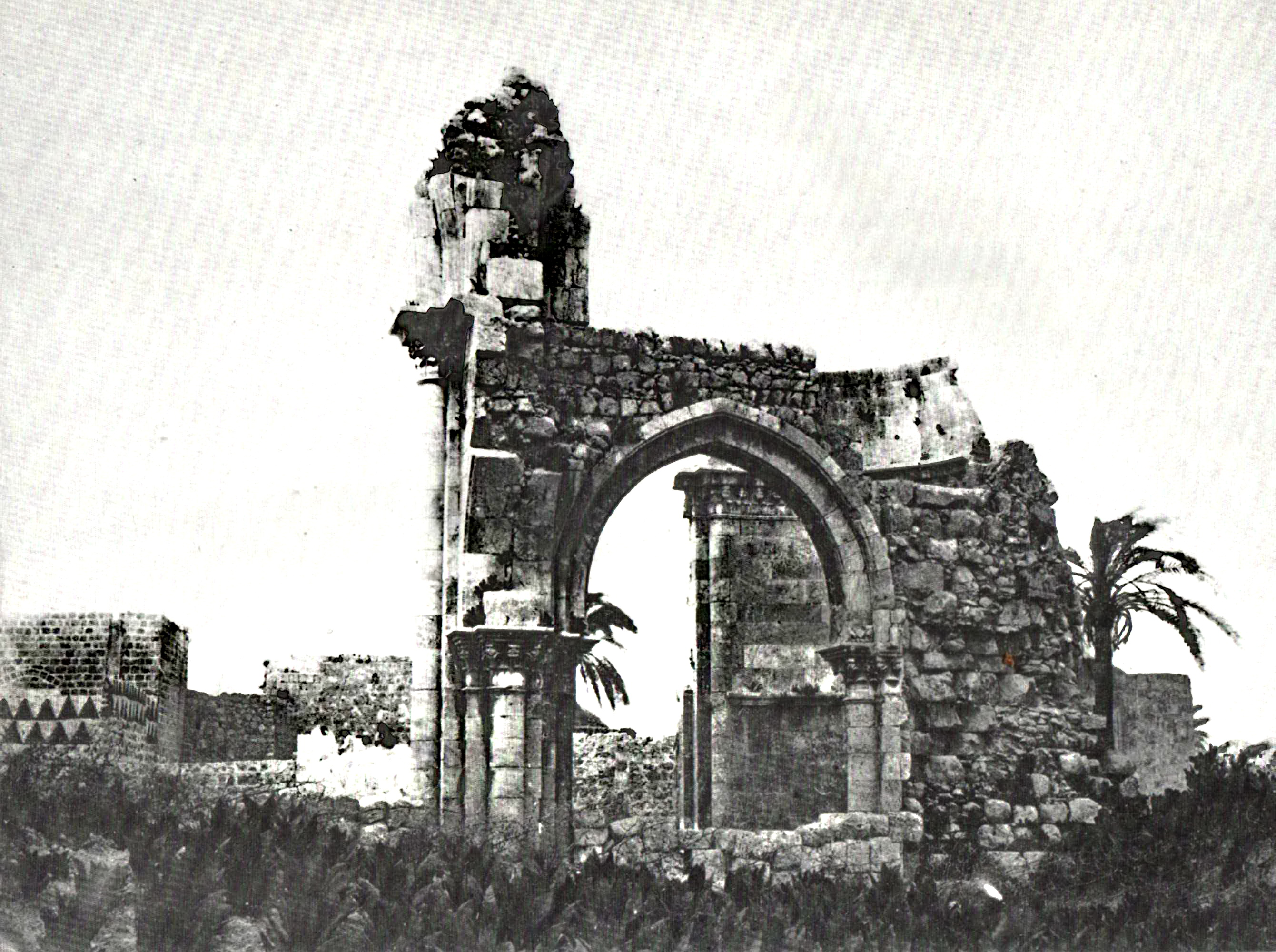
1866 (east end ruins, viewed from the south)

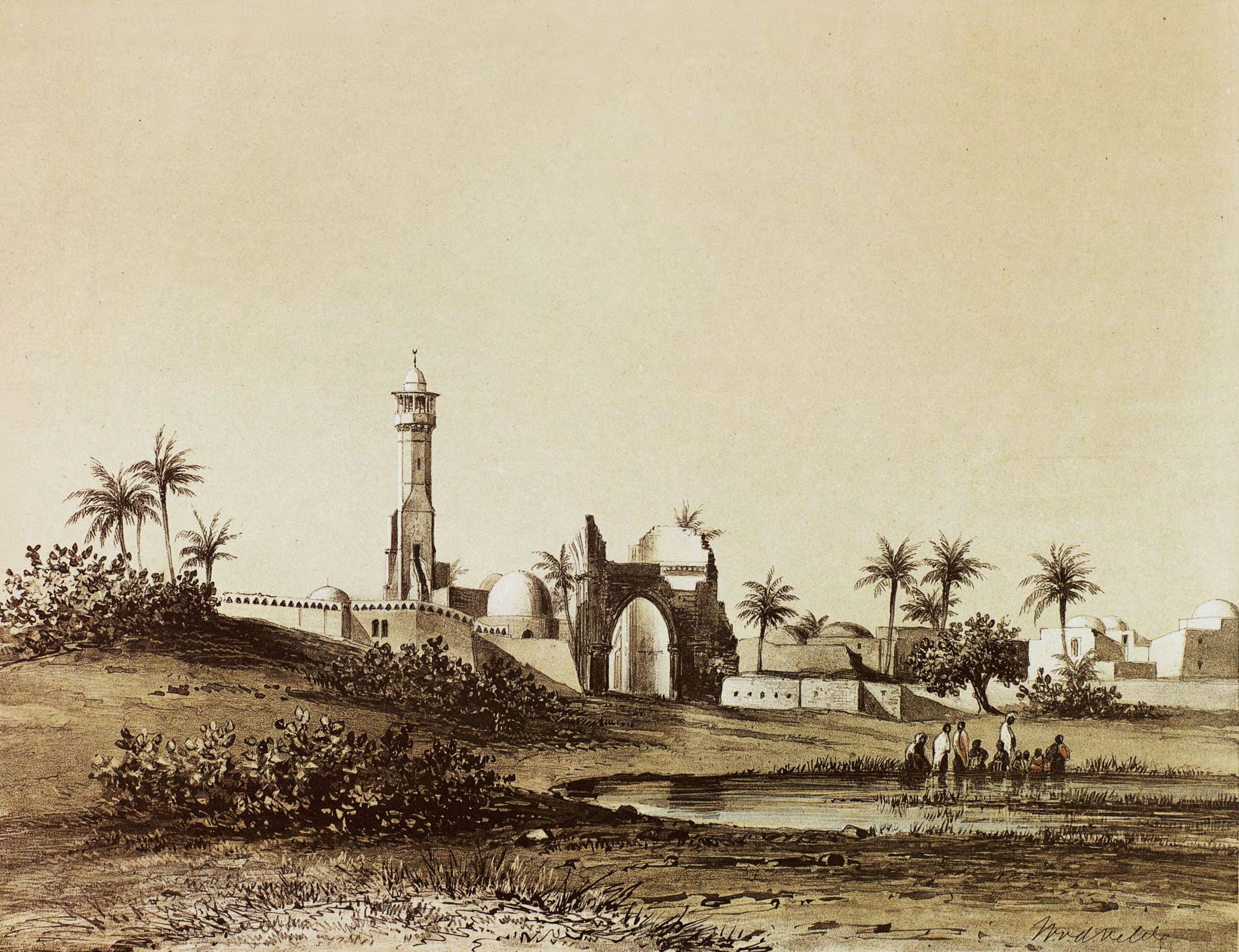
1857

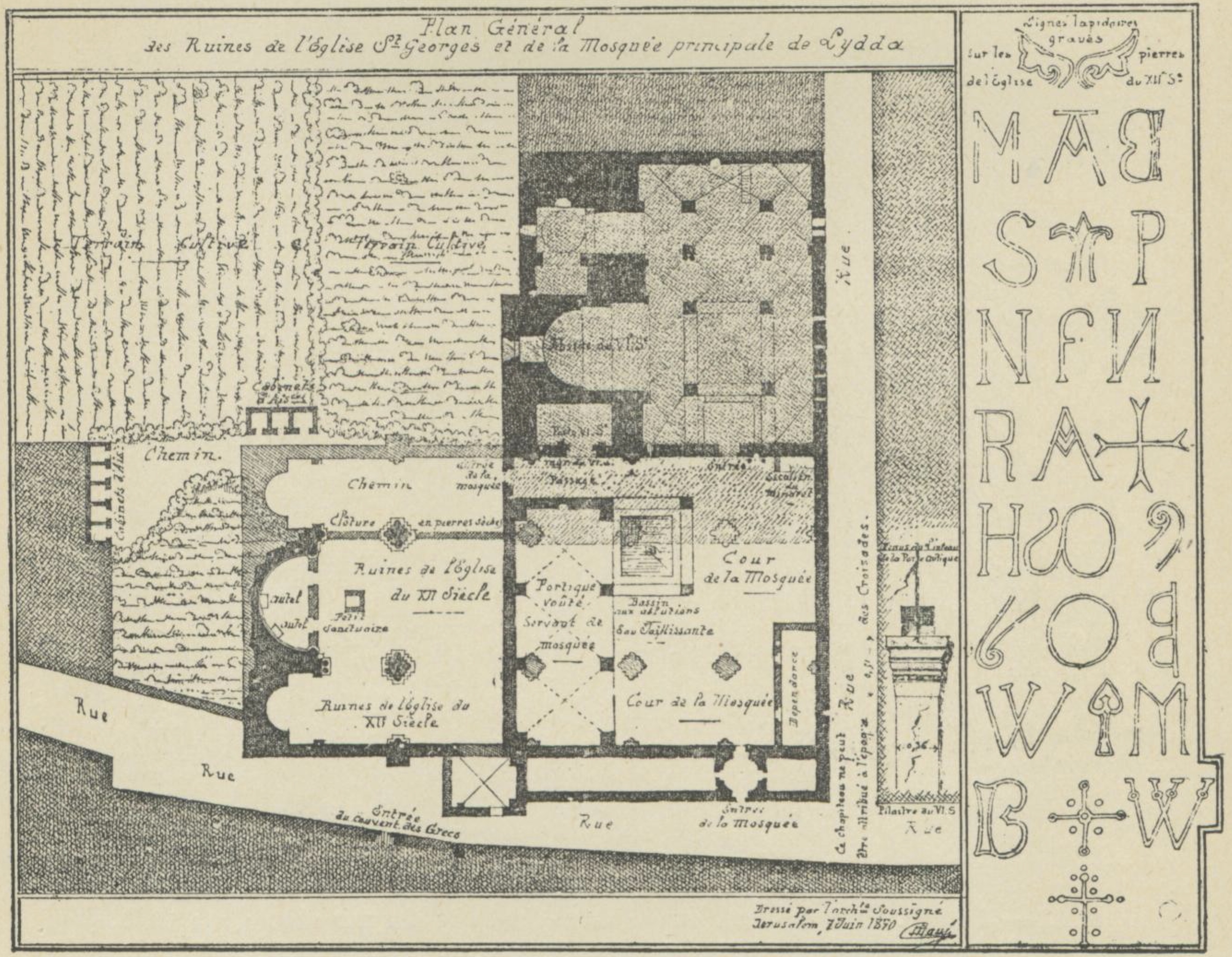
1870

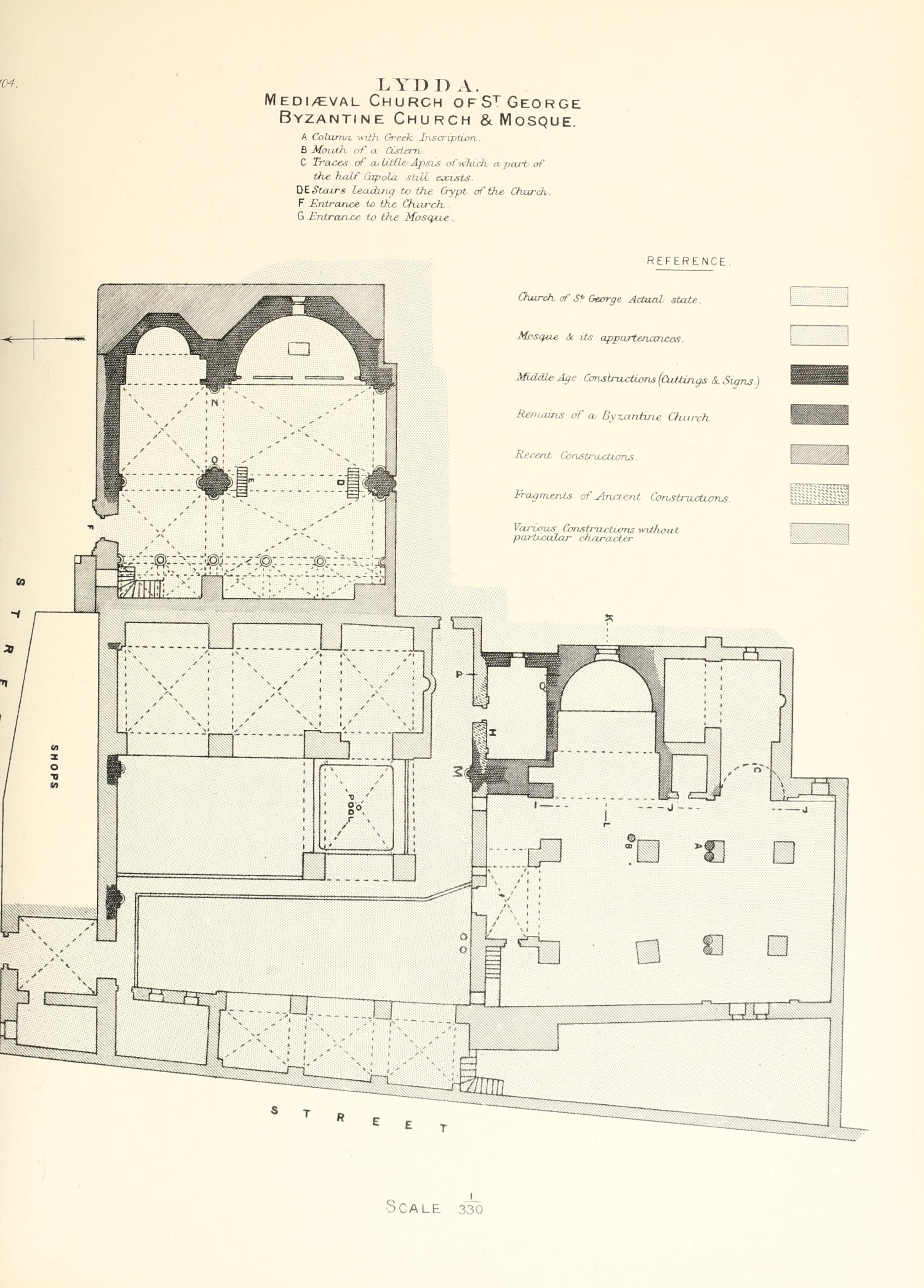
1873–74

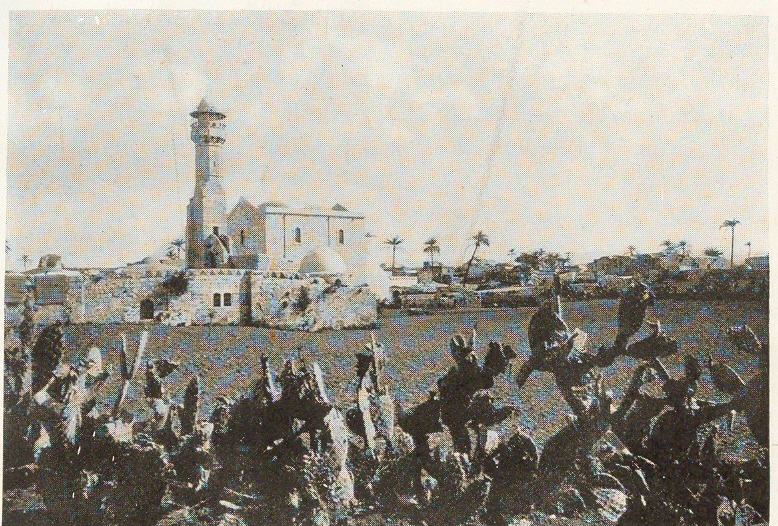
1910

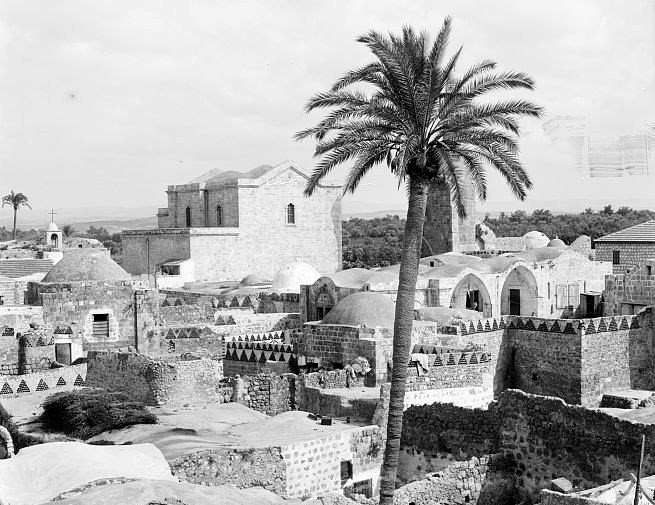
c. 1920

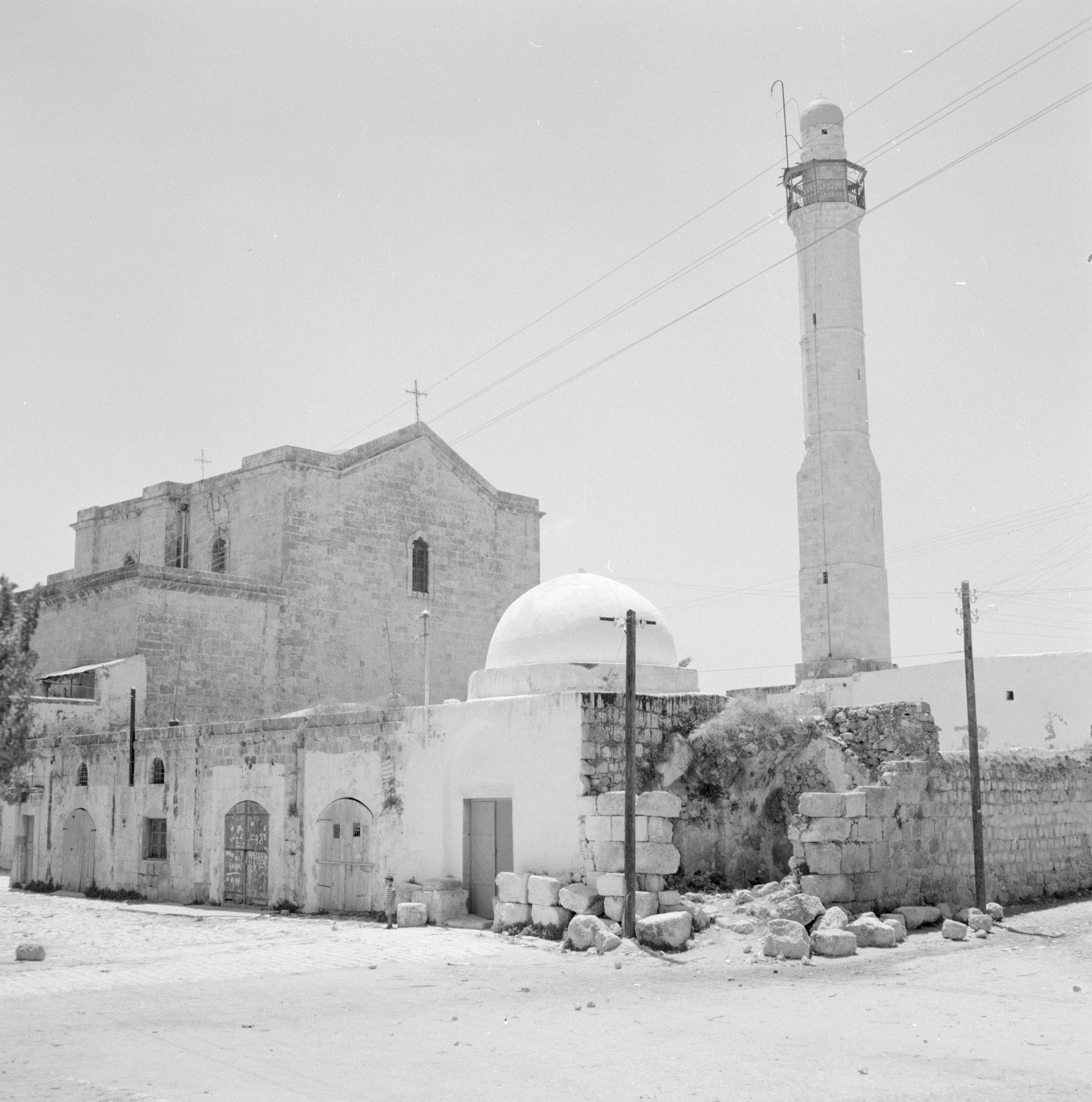
1948–49

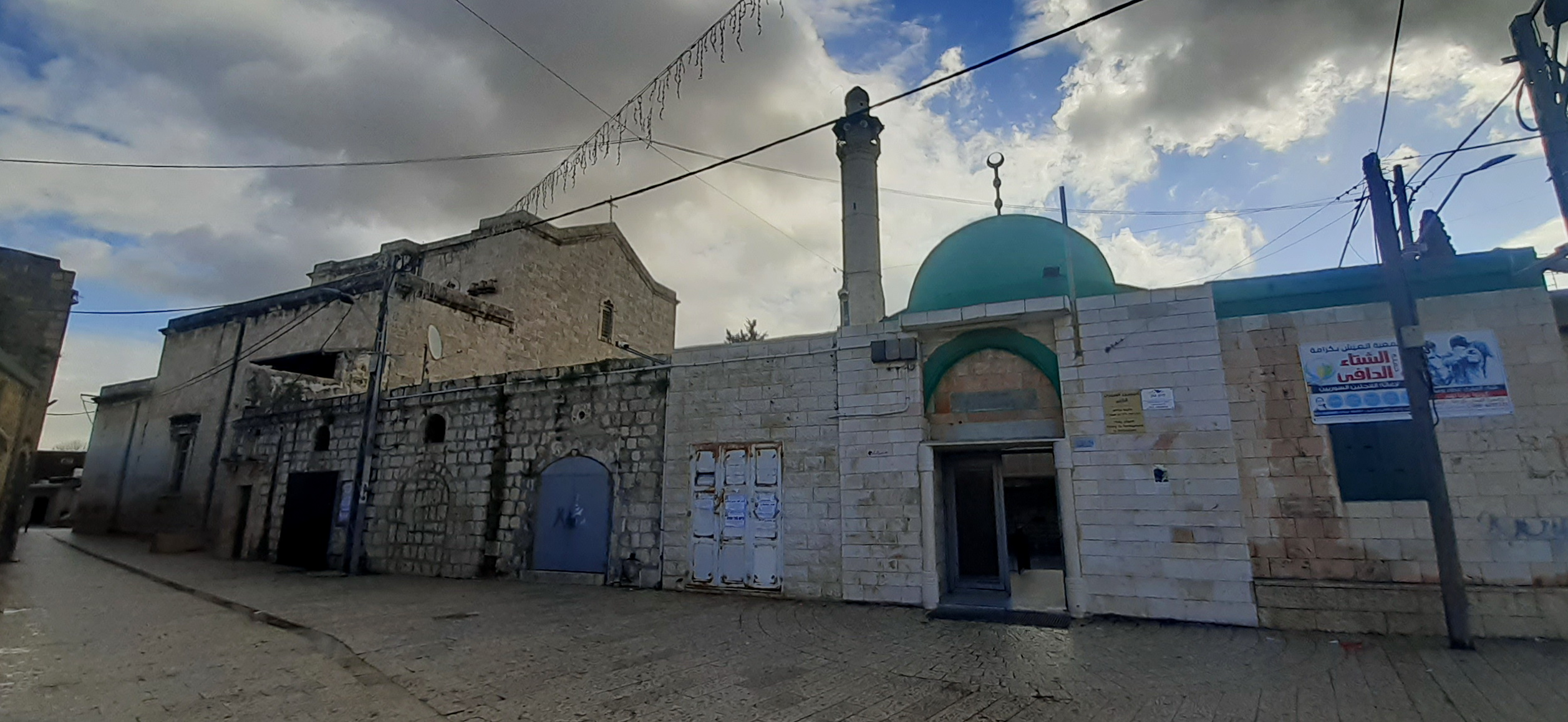
2022

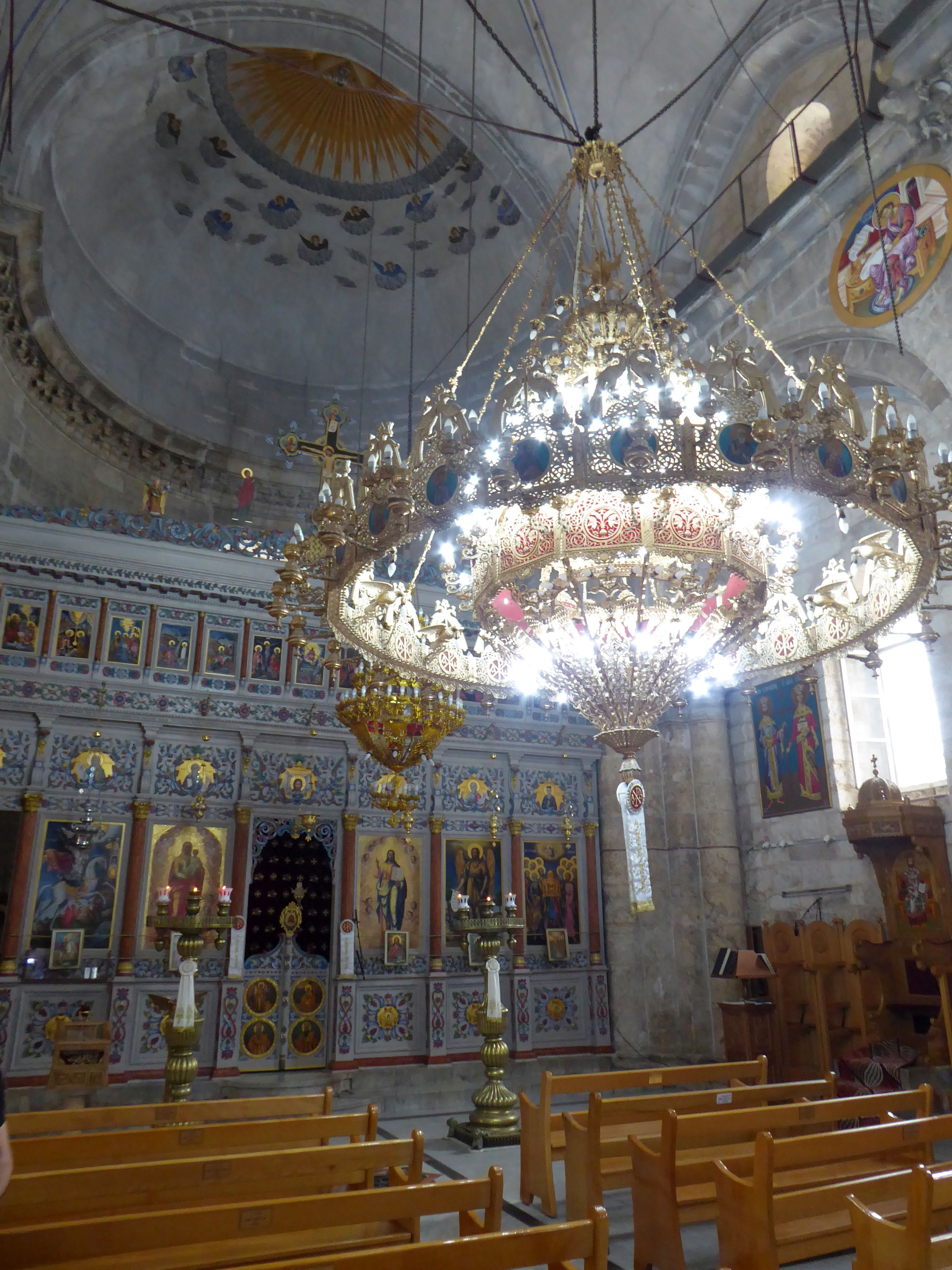
Iconostasis and chandelier

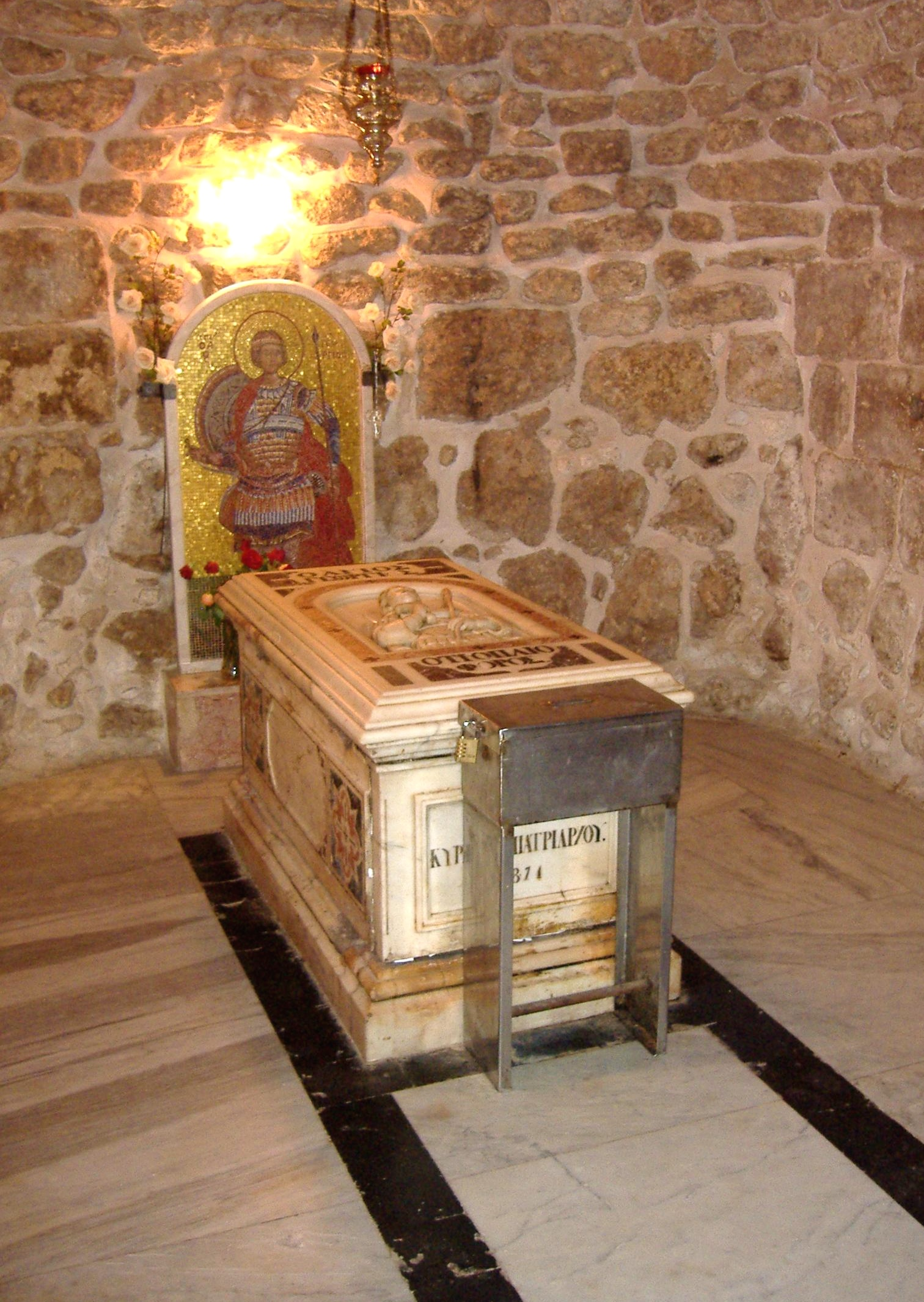
The symbolic sarcophagus of St George from the crypt

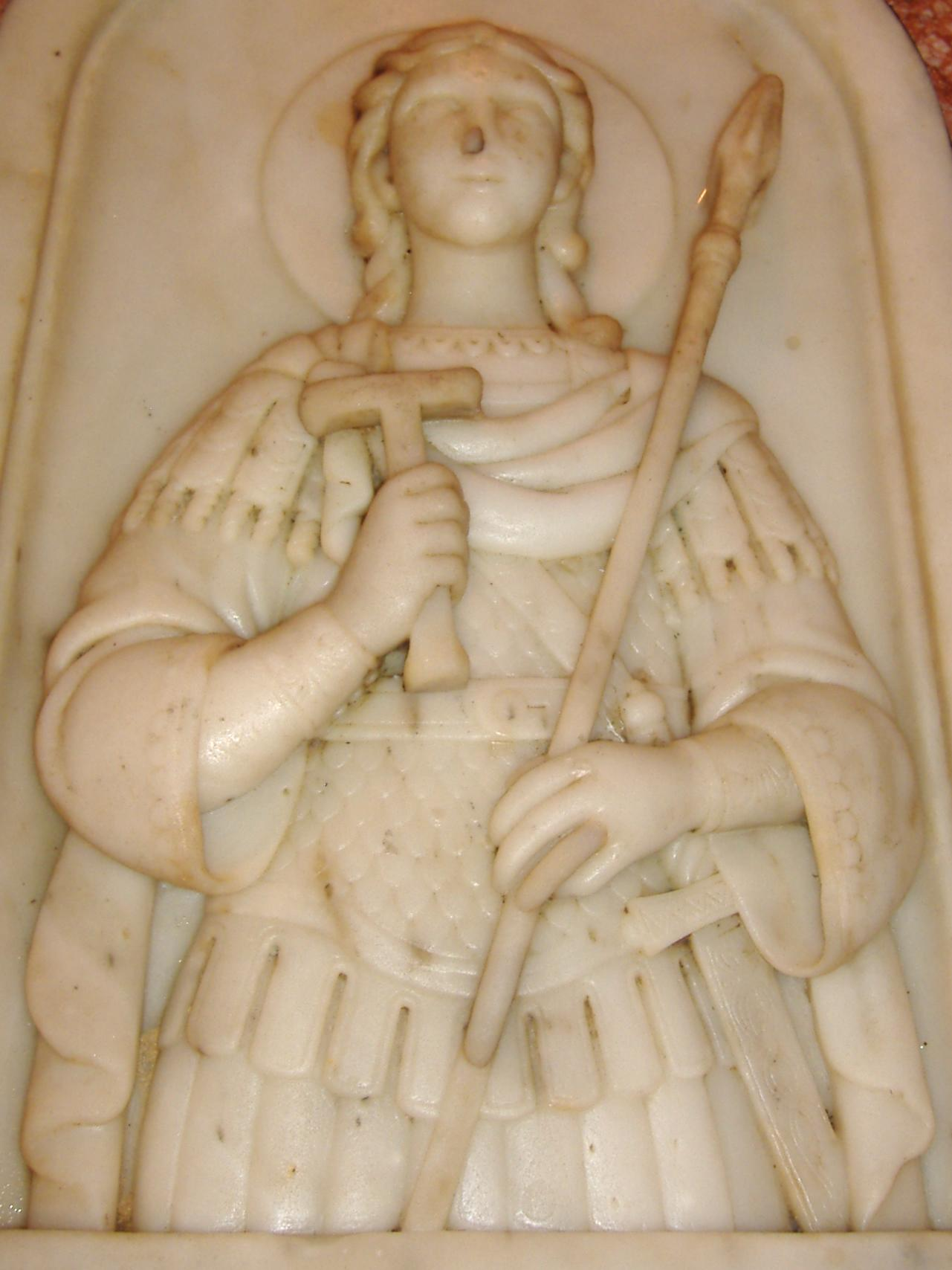
Bas-relief on the sarcophagus

== See also ==
- Saint George in devotions, traditions and prayers
- Monastery of Saint George, al-Khader, a Greek Orthodox monastery near Bethlehem
- Christianity in Israel
