= Conrad Grünenberg =

South German patrician and author (c. 1415–1494)

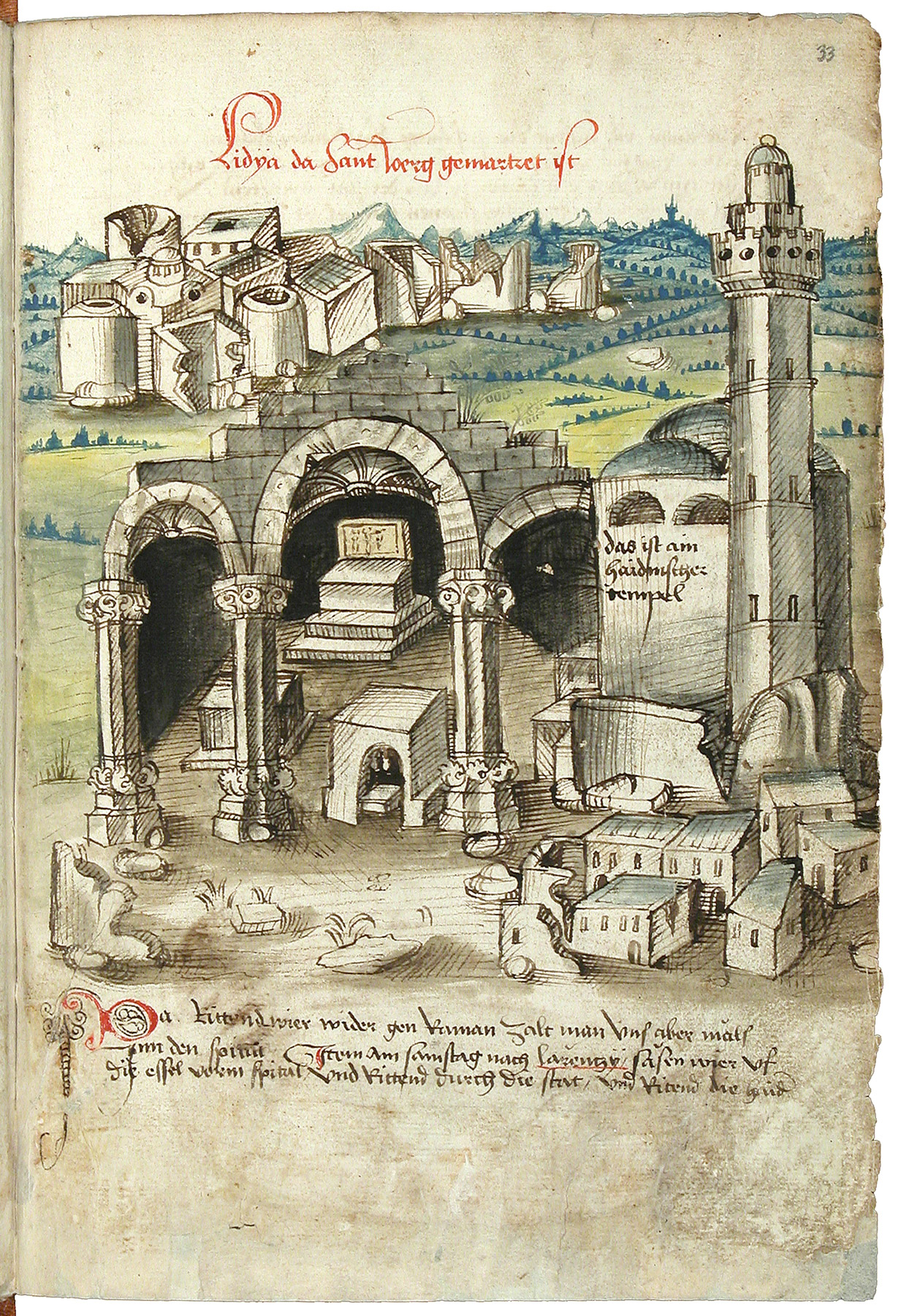
The Church of Saint George and Mosque of Al-Khadr, Lydda, with the mosque labelled as ain haidnischer tempel, "a pagan temple" (Cod. St. Peter pap. 32 fol. 33r).

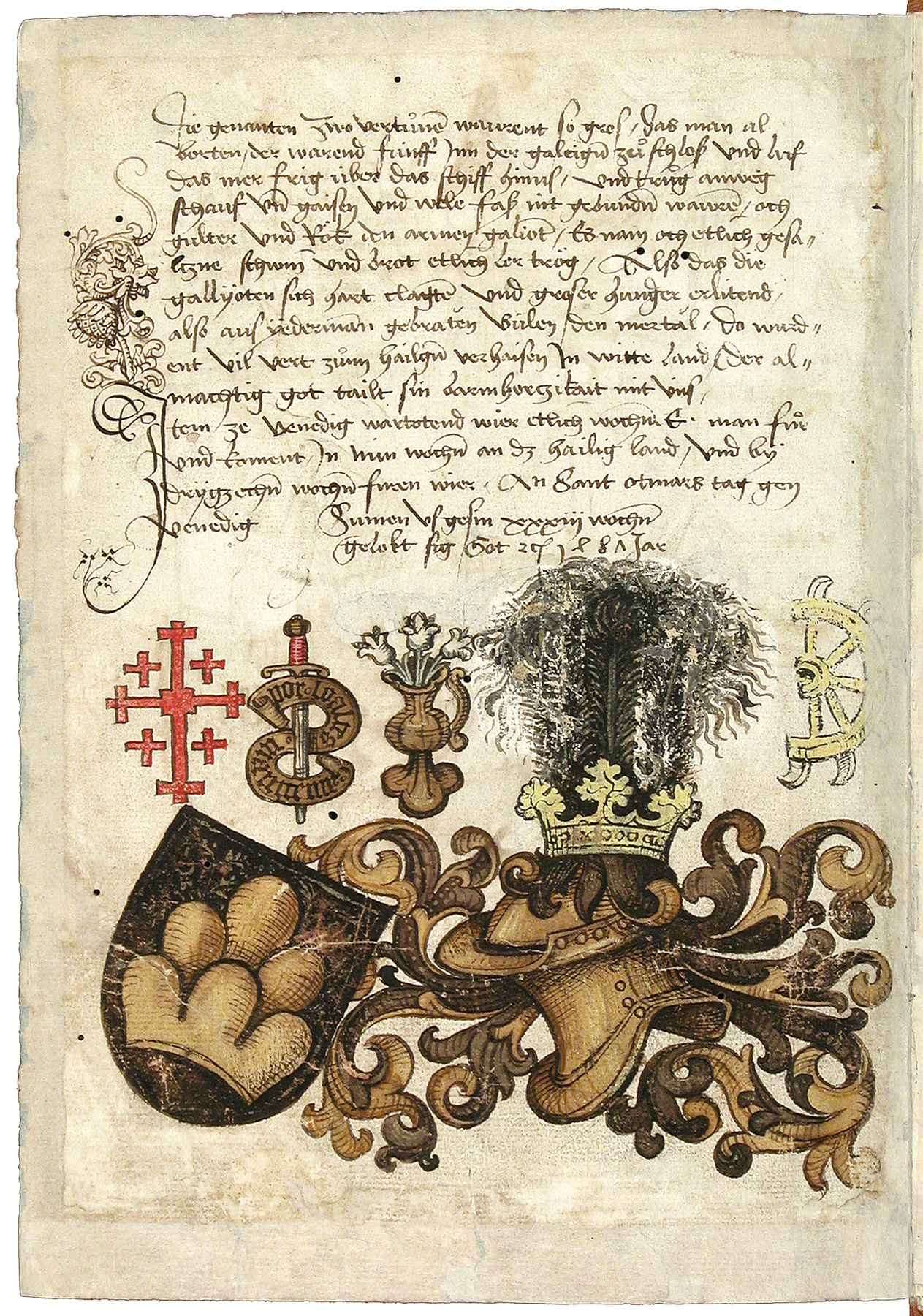
Grünenberg's coat of arms on the final page of his travelogue, with the Jerusalem cross for the Order of the Holy Sepulchre, the sword and scroll of the Cyprian Order of the Sword, the jar with the lilies of the Virgin of the Aragonese Order of the Jar, and half of the wheel of Saint Catherine.

Conrad Grünenberg, also spelled Konrad, Grünemberg, Grünberg (probably born around 1415; died 1494) was a patrician from Constance in southern Germany, known as the author of three books, two armorials and a travelogue: the Österreichische Wappenchronik (lit. 'Austrian armorial chronicle', c. 1470); the Wappenbuch (lit. 'Book of coat-of-arms', c. 1483), containing some 2000 coats-of-arms, which he presented as a gift to Emperor Frederick III; and the illustrated description of his 1486 pilgrimage to Jerusalem (extant in two original manuscripts, both from 1487, the Karlsruhe and the Gotha codices).

== Life ==
Grünenberg was perhaps born around 1415 or earlier, as the son of the mayor of Constance. He is first mentioned in 1441 as a judge and church architect. By 1465, he had been in the service of Emperor Frederick III for some time, and at the latest 1486 on held the rank of Ritter. In Jerusalem, he was probably made a Knight of the Holy Sepulchre. He was furthermore a member of the Aragonese Order of the Jar and of the Austrian Order of Saint George.

=== Holy Land pilgrimage (1486) ===
His pilgrimage to the Holy Land lasted 33 weeks, from April to early December 1486. Starting out in Constance on 22 April, he travelled to Venice via Rheineck, Sterzing in Tyrol and Trento, and (31 May) from Venice by galley via Poreč in Istria, Dalmatia (Zadar, Šibenik, Lesina, Korčula and Ragusa) to Corfu, Modon in Morea, then on to Candia on Crete, Rhodes, and Cyprus (Limassol, Galini, Famagusta), arriving in Jaffa on 24 July.

Travelling by donkey, he visited Lydda, Ramla, Emmaus (i.e. Imwas), Jerusalem and Bethlehem.

On 1 September he took a ship back from Jaffa, reaching Venice on 16 November (Saint Othmar's day), returning home in early December.

The two original illustrated manuscripts describing the pilgrimage were already completed in 1487 and are considered to be autograph. The slightly older one is being kept at the Baden State Library in Karlsruhe as Cod. St. Peter pap. 32; and the next and more detailed one is being kept at the Gotha Research Center of the University of Erfurt. Both codices contain coloured drawings, and while some of the drawings in the Karlsruhe codex seem to be made by Grünenberg himself, the Gotha codex is illustrated with larger drawings that combine features of the Karlsruhe drawings with features borrowed from Erhard Reuwich's work, originating from Reuwich's own 1483-4 pilgrimage. The Karlsruhe codex has been interpreted as Grünenberg's own private copy, with the Gotha codex, which contains a more elaborate text and more detailed drawings, interpreted as a presentation copy dedicated to some important personality.

== Revised and facsimile editions ==
- Stillfried-Alcantara, Hildebrandt, Des Conrad Grünenberg, Ritters und Burgers zu Costenz, Wappenbuch. Volbracht am nünden Tag des Abrellen do man zalt tusend vierhundert drü und achtzig jar. Görlitz 1875–1884, (new facsimile edition 2009)
- Johann Goldfriedrich, Walter Fränzel (eds.). Ritter Grünembergs Pilgerfahrt ins Heilige Land 1486, Leipzig 1912, (Voigtländers Quellenbücher 18), (new facsimile edition 2009).
- Aercke, Kristian (ed.), The story of Sir Konrad Grünemberg's pilgrimage to the Holy Land in 1486 (2005).
- Denke, Andrea, Konrad Grünembergs Pilgerreise ins Heilige Land 1486. Untersuchung, Edition und Kommentar (2010).

== Bibliography ==
- Andreas Klußmann, In Gottes Namen fahren wir. Die spätmittelalterlichen Pilgerberichte von Felix Fabri, Bernhard von Breydenbach und Konrad Grünemberg im Vergleich (2012).
- Christof Rolker, Konrad Grünenbergs Wappenbuch: acta et agenda, in: Zeitschrift für die Geschichte des Oberrheins 162 (2014), 191–207
- Philipp Ruppert, Ritter Konrad Grünenberg, in: Konstanzer geschichtliche Beiträge. Zweites Heft, Konstanz 1890, 34–3
- Claudia Zrenner, Die Berichte der europäischen Jerusalempilger (1475-1500): ein literarischer Vergleich im historischen Kontext (1981)
