= Jüri (given name) =

Estonian masculine given name

Jüri is an Estonian masculine given name. It is often a diminutive of the given name Jürgen. People named Jüri include:

- Jüri Aarma (1951–2019), actor, musician and journalist
- Jüri Adams (born 1947), politician
- Jüri Allik (born 1949), psychologist
- Jüri Alperten (1957–2020), conductor, pianist and music teacher
- Jüri Annusson (1884–1965), politician
- Jüri Arrak (1936–2022), painter
- Jüri Ehlvest (1967–2006), writer
- Jüri Jaakson (1870–1942), businessman and politician
- Jüri Jaanson (born 1965), rower
- Jüri Järvet (1919–1995), actor
- Jüri Käen (born 1970), swimmer and coach
- Jüri Kallas (born 1967), translator, publisher and editor
- Jüri-Ruut Kangur (born 1975), conductor
- Jüri Käo (born 1965), businessman
- Jüri Kaver (born 1974), politician
- Jüri Kerem (1943–1993), caricaturist and portraitist
- Jüri Kivimäe (born 1947), historian and archivist
- Jüri Kork (born 1947), politician
- Jüri Kraft (1935–2023), economist and politician
- Jüri Krjukov (1954–1997), actor
- Jüri Kukk (1940–1981), chemist, pedagogue and Soviet dissident
- Jüri Kuuskemaa (born 1942), art historian, curator, heritage advocate and radio host
- Jüri Liim (born 1940), politician, investigative journalist and long-distance runner
- Jüri Lina (born 1949), journalist, writer, music producer and film director
- Jüri Lossmann (1891–1984), long distance runner
- Jüri Lotman (1922–1993), semiotician
- Jüri Luik (born 1966), diplomat and politician
- Jüri Marksoo (1876–1941), politician
- Jüri Martin (1940–2025), politician
- Jüri Mõis (born 1956), businessman and politician
- Jüri Müür (1929–1984), film director and scenarist
- Jüri Nael (born 1975), choreographer, dance and physical theatre pedagogue
- Jüri Okas (born 1950), architect
- Jüri Parijõgi (1892–1941), children's writer and teacher
- Jüri Parik (1889–1929), politician
- Jüri Pertmann (1938–2019), dissident and civil servant
- Jüri Pihl (1954–2019), politician
- Jüri Põld (1956–2025), judge
- Jüri Pootsmann (born 1994), singer
- Jüri Raidla (born 1957), lawyer
- Jüri Randviir (1927–1996), chess player and journalist
- Jüri Ratas (born 1978), politician
- Jüri Rätsep (1935–2018), lawyer, politician and judge
- Jüri Reinvere (born 1971), composer
- Jüri Rummo (1856–1???), outlaw and folk hero
- Jüri Saar (born 1956), politician
- Jüri Selirand (1928–2017), archaeologist, historian, and translator
- Jüri Sepp (born 1952), economist
- Jüri Sillart (1943–2011), film operator, director and producer
- Jüri Talvet (born 1945), poet and academic
- Jüri Tamm (1957–2021), hammer thrower and politician
- Jüri Tarmak (1946–2022), high jumper
- Jüri Toomepuu (born 1930), journalist and politician
- Jüri Truusmann (1856–1930), Estonian writer, ethnographer and linguist
- Jüri Tuulik (1940–2014), writer and playwright
- Jüri-Mikk Udam (born 1994), rower
- Jüri Üdi, pseudonym of Juhan Viiding (1948–1995), poet and actor
- Jüri Uluots (1890–1945), politician
- Jüri Uustalu (1889–1973), politician
- Jüri Välbe (1911–1964), footballer
- Jüri Vetemaa (1956–2003), chess player and chess journalist
- Jüri Vilms (1889–1918), politician
- Jüri Vips (born 2000), racing driver
- Jüri Võigemast (born 1956), Estonian politician

== See also ==
- Juri (disambiguation)
- Jüri, settlement in Estonia, named after Saint George (Püha Jüri in Estonian)
