= Iury =

Iury is a Brazilian masculine first name. It is a variation of Yury. It is also a variation of the Spanish and Portuguese name Jorge.

== People with this name ==
- Iury (footballer, born 1995), Brazilian footballer
- Iury (footballer, born 1998), football player for Villa Nova

== See also ==
- Yuri (disambiguation)
- Yury
