= Truusmann =

Truusmann is an Estonian surname. Notable people with the surname include:

- Jaan Truusmann (1866–1932), Estonian teacher, farmer, and public figure
- Jüri Truusmann (1856–1930), Estonian censor, writer, ethnographer, and linguist
