= Juri =

Juri, JURI or Jüri may refer to:

== Law ==
- Dative singular case of Latin Jus
- Committee on Legal Affairs, committee of the European Parliament, known as JURI

== Places ==
- Juri Upazila, subdistrict (upazila) in Maulvibazar District, Sylhet Division, Bangladesh
- Jüri, settlement in Rae Parish, Harju County, Estonia
- Juri, Razavi Khorasan (جوري), a village in Razavi Khorasan Province, Iran

== People ==
=== Given name ===
- Jüri (given name), an Estonian masculine given name
- variant romanization of Yury (George)
  - Juri De Marco (born 1979), Italian football goalkeeper
  - Juri Judt (born 1986), German footballer
  - Juri Kurakin (born 1987), Estonian ice dancer
  - Juri Schlünz (born 1961), German football player and coach
  - Juri Toppan (born 1990), Italian footballer
- 樹里, a feminine Japanese name
  - Juri Hara (born 1993), former Japanese professional baseball player
  - Juri Ide (井出 樹里; born 1983), Japanese triathlete
  - Juri Manase (born 1975), Japanese actress
  - Juri Misaki (born 1980), Japanese manga artist
  - Juri Osada, Japanese figure skater
  - Juri Ueno (born 1986), Japanese actress
  - Juri Yokoyama (born 1955), Japanese volleyball player
  - Juri Takahashi (born 1997), Japanese singer

=== Surname ===
- Aurelio Juri (born 1949), Slovenian politician
- Carla Juri (born 1985), Swiss actress
- Sakiho Juri (born 1971), Japanese actor

=== Fictional characters ===
- Juri Nijou, a member of the United Air Force in Chouriki Sentai Ohranger
- Juri Arisugawa (Revolutionary Girl Utena) a member of the school council, also becomes a duelist later on in the series
- Juri Han, a playable character in the Street Fighter series

== See also ==
- Yuri (disambiguation)
