= Iuri =

Iuri may refer to:

- Iuri Akobia (1937–2014), Georgian composer
- Iuri Alcântara, Brazilian mixed martial arts fighter
- Iuri Fernandes, Portuguese kickboxer
- Iuri Filosi, Italian cyclist
- Iuri Gabiskiria, Georgian footballer
- Iuri Gomes, Portuguese footballer
- Iúri Leitão (born 1998), Portuguese cyclist
- Iuri Lomadze, Georgian Greco-Roman wrestler
- Iuri Medeiros (born 1994), Portuguese footballer
- Iuri Miguel, Portuguese footballer
- Iuri Osip'ovi, Soviet fencer
- Iuri Tabatadze (born 1999), Georgian footballer
- Iuri Tavares (born 2001), Cape Verdean footballer

== See also ==
- Iurie
- Yuri (disambiguation)
