= Välbe =

Family name

Välbe is an Estonian surname. Notable people with the surname include:

- Jüri Välbe (1911–1964), Estonian footballer
- Katrin Välbe (1904–1981), Estonian actress
- Urmas Välbe (born 1966), Estonian cross-country skier
- Yelena Välbe (born 1968), Russian cross-country skier
