= George's Day in Autumn =

Orthodox Christian feast day

Saint George's Day Saint George's Day in Autumn
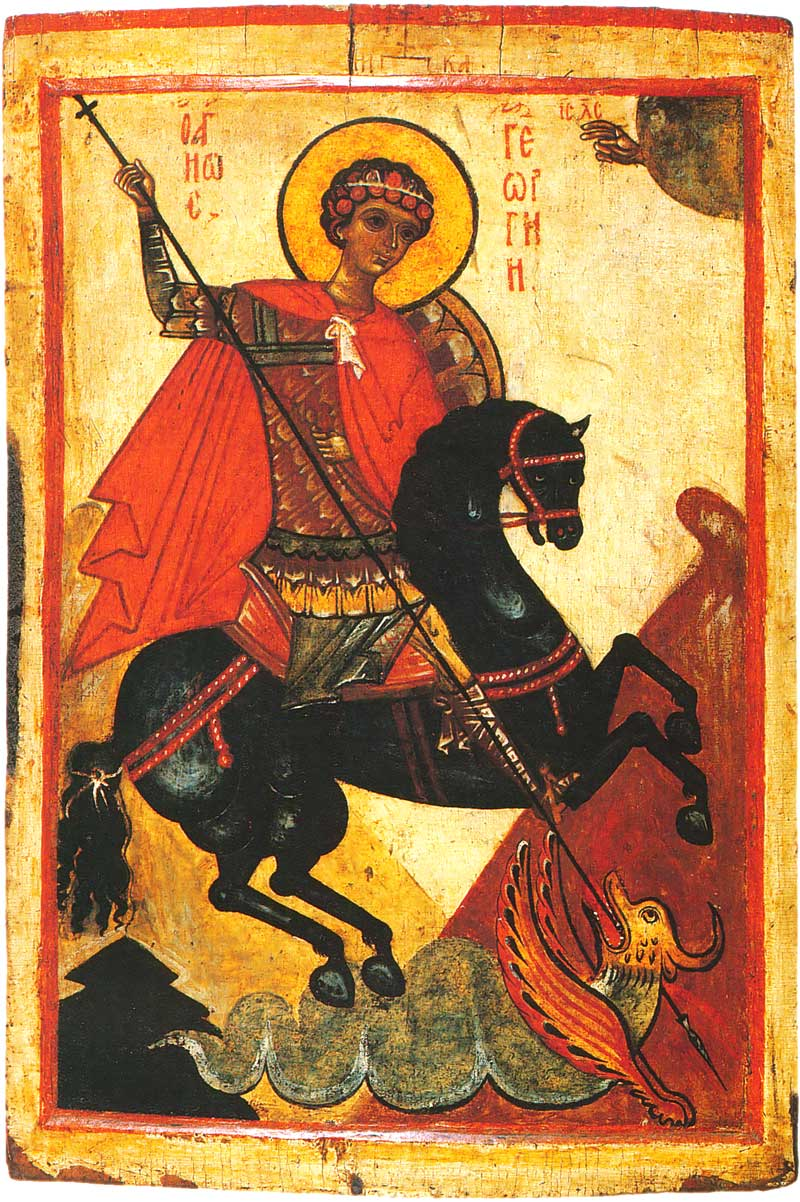
- Russian icon of Saint George, Novgorod, mid-14th century
- Date: 16 November
- Next time: 16 November 2026
- Frequency: annual
- Related to: Saint George's Day, and George's Day in Spring

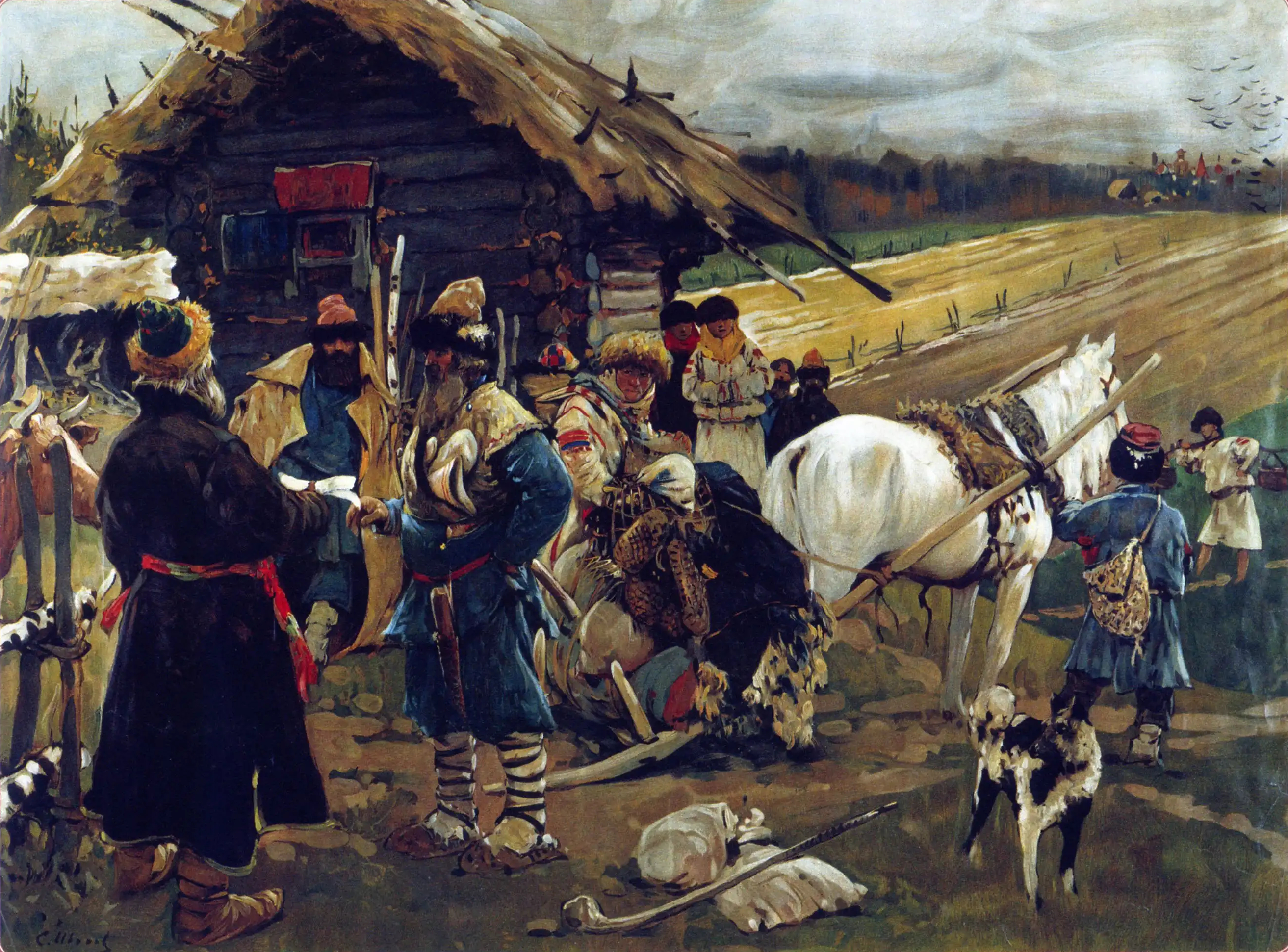
Yuri's Day in the Autumn. A Peasant Leaving His Landlord on Yuri's Day, painting by Sergey Ivanov

George's Day in Autumn, or Saint George's Day, (Note: Russian: Егорий Осенний, romanized: Yegoriy Osenniy, lit. 'George's Day in Autumn', or Russian: Юрьев день, romanized: Yuriev den, lit. 'George's Day'; Serbian: Ђурђиц / Đurđic.) is one of two feasts of Saint George, celebrated by the Russian Orthodox Church (9 December [O.S. 26 November]), the Serbian Orthodox Church (16 November [O.S. 3 November]), and the Georgian Orthodox Church (23 November [O.S. 10 November]), the other being Saint George's Day of Spring (6 May [O.S. 23 April]).

Đurđic is one of major Serbian Slava (patron saint) days.

== History ==
Yuri's Day in the Autumn, celebrated after the end of the agricultural year and the gathering of the harvest, had a special significance on the calendar of Russian peasants during the centuries when the system of Russian serfdom was becoming established. From the mid-15th century, and particularly after the Sudebnik of 1497 was codified, Muscovite law defined the two weeks' period around the autumn as Yuri's Day (one week before the feast and one week after it) and as the only time of the year when Russian peasants were free to move from one landowner to another, provided that they had fulfilled their obligations and settled any debt. The government later tried to limit the movement of peasants from their place of work, and in 1597, during Boris Godunov's regency, the government allowed landowners to recall peasants who had left them.

A popular Russian expression harking back to that event still survives: "вот тебе, бабушка, и Юрьев день", meaning "so much for Yuri's Day, Granny", referring to a broken promise or, more generally, to any failed expectation. The Russian word "объегорить" (meaning to deceive or fool someone, literally, "to Yegor around", with Yegor also being one of the variants of the name "George") has the same origin.

== See also ==
- George's Day in Spring
- Saint George's Day

== Bibliography ==
- Crummey, Robert O. (6 June 2014). The Formation of Muscovy 1300 - 1613. Routledge. ISBN 978-1-317-87200-9.
- Panchenko, Alexander. Review of the book by Laura Stark, Peasants, Pilgrims, and Sacred Promises: Ritual and Supernatural in Orthodox Karelian Folk Religion
