= Yuri =

Yuri may refer to:

== Art and media ==
- Yuri (genre), Japanese female-female romance genre

== People ==
=== Given name ===
- Yuri (Slavic name), the Slavic masculine form of the given name George, including a list of people with the given name Yuri, Yury, etc.
- Yuri (Japanese name), feminine Japanese given names, including a list of people and fictional characters
- Yu-ri (Korean name), Korean given name, including a list of people and fictional characters

=== Mononym ===
- Yuri Gagarin (1934–1968), Soviet pioneer cosmonaut, sometimes referred to mononymously

==== Singers ====
- Yuri (Japanese singer), vocalist of the band Move
- Yuri (singer, born 1976), member of Girl Friends
- Yuri (Mexican singer), stage name by Yuridia Valenzuela Canseco

==== Footballers ====
- Yuri (footballer, born 1982), full name Yuri de Souza Fonseca, Brazilian football forward
- Yuri (footballer, born 1984), full name Yuri Adriano Santos, Brazilian footballer
- Yuri (footballer, born January 1996), full name Yuri Antonio Costa da Silva, Brazilian footballer
- Yuri (footballer, born 2001), full name Yuri de Oliveira, Brazilian football midfielder
- Yuri Araújo (born 1996), full name Yuri Nascimento de Araujo, Brazilian footballer
- Yuri Lara (born 1994), full name Yuri Lima Lara, Brazilian football midfielder
- Yuri Lima (born 1994), full name Yuri Oliveira Lima, Brazilian football defensive midfielder
- Yuri Naves (born 1989), full name Yuri Naves Roberto, Brazilian football defensive midfielder
- Yuri Messias (born 1991), full name Yuri de Jesus Messias, Brazilian footballer
- Yuri Tanque (born 1998), full name Yuri Jonathan Vitor Coelho, Brazilian footballer

==== Fictional characters ====
- Yuri (Doki Doki Literature Club!), from the video game Doki Doki Literature Club!
- Yuri Katsuki and Yuri Plisetsky, from the anime Yuri on Ice
- Yuri Lowell, from the video game Tales of Vesperia
- Yuri Sakazaki, from the Art of Fighting video game series

==== Other ====
- Carabayo, an uncontacted indigenous group in Colombia also called Yuri

== Languages ==
- Yuri language (Amazon), a possibly extinct language of Colombia and Brazil thought to be connected with Ticuna
- Karkar language, a language isolate spoken in Papua New Guinea also known as Yuri

== Places ==
- Yuri (island), one of the Kuril islands claimed by Japan
- Yuri, Akita, Japan, a former town in Akita Prefecture, Japan; now part of Yurihonjō
- Yuri District, Akita, Japan, a former district

== Other uses ==
- Yuri (satellite), the first dedicated Japanese broadcasting satellite and start of the BS-series
- Yuri I, a human-powered helicopter developed in Japan
- Yuri (unit), an unofficial unit of specific strength

== See also ==
- Typhoon Yuri (disambiguation)
- Yuriko (disambiguation)
- Juri (disambiguation)
- Iuri (disambiguation)
- Yūrei, figures in Japanese folklore, analogous to Western legends of ghosts
