= Joeri =

Joeri (Dutch pronunciation: [ˈjuːri]) is a Dutch transliteration of the Slavic masculine given name Yury (George) and as such a given name in Belgium and the Netherlands since the early 1960s. It is occasionally spelled Joerie. People with this name include:

- Joeri Adams (born 1989), Belgian cyclist
- Joeri Calleeuw (born 1985), Belgian cyclist
- Joeri Dequevy (born 1988), Belgian footballer
- Joeri van Dijk (born 1983), Dutch sailor
- Joeri Fransen (born 1981), Belgian pop singer
- Joeri de Groot (born 1977), Dutch rower
- Joeri Jansen (born 1979), Belgian middle-distance runner
- Joeri de Kamps (born 1992), Dutch footballer
- Joeri van Leeuwen (born 1975), Dutch astronomer
- Joerie Mes (born 1979), Dutch kickboxer
- Joeri Poelmans (born 1995), Belgian footballer
- Joeri Schroyen (born 1991), Dutch footballer
- Joeri Stallaert (born 1991), Belgian cyclist
- Joerie Vansteelant (born 1982), Belgian duathlete and triathlete
- Joeri Vastmans (born 1983), Belgian footballer
- Joeri Verlinden (born 1988), Dutch swimmer
