= Painküla =

Village in Estonia

Coordinates: 58°43′N 26°24′E

- Village
- Interactive map of Painküla
- Country: Estonia
- County: Jõgeva County
- Parish: Jõgeva Parish
- Time zone: UTC+2 (EET)
  - Summer (DST): UTC+3 (EEST)

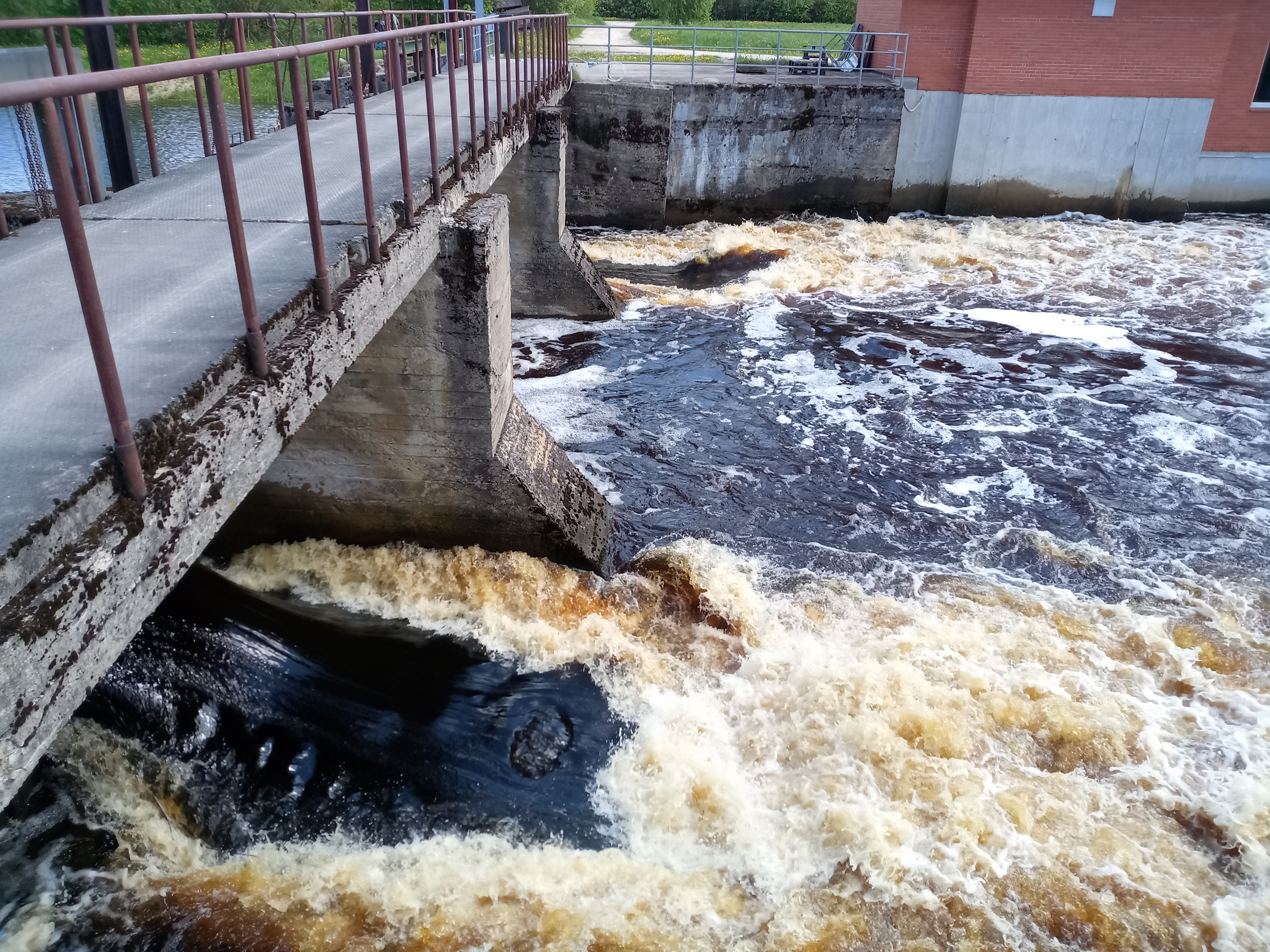
Painküla Dam on the Pedja River (Painküla, May 2021)

Painküla is a village in Jõgeva Parish, Jõgeva County in eastern Estonia.

== Name ==
Painküla was attested in historical sources as Pankull in 1601, Painkull in 1624, and Painkül in 1739. The second part of the name, küla, means 'village', but the origin of the first part of the name is uncertain. Based on phonological similarity, various words can be associated with the first element (e.g., pain(e) 'wooden block used for bending a horse bow', painand 'wooden vessel with bent sides', painard 'scythe handle', etc.). However, it is unclear how such phonetic equivalents would be associated with this place name.

== History ==
The neighboring village of Eristvere, about 1.6 kilometers (0.99 mi) to the northwest, was merged with Painküla in 1977.

== Notable people ==
Notable people that were born or lived in Painküla include the following:

- Vambola Rähn (1923–1984), playwright and theatre critic
- Martin Taras (1899–1968), opera singer
- Jaan Truusmann (1866–1932), teacher, farmer, and public figure
- Jüri Truusmann (1856–1930), censor, writer, ethnographer, and linguist
