= Saint George's Day =

Feast day of Saint George

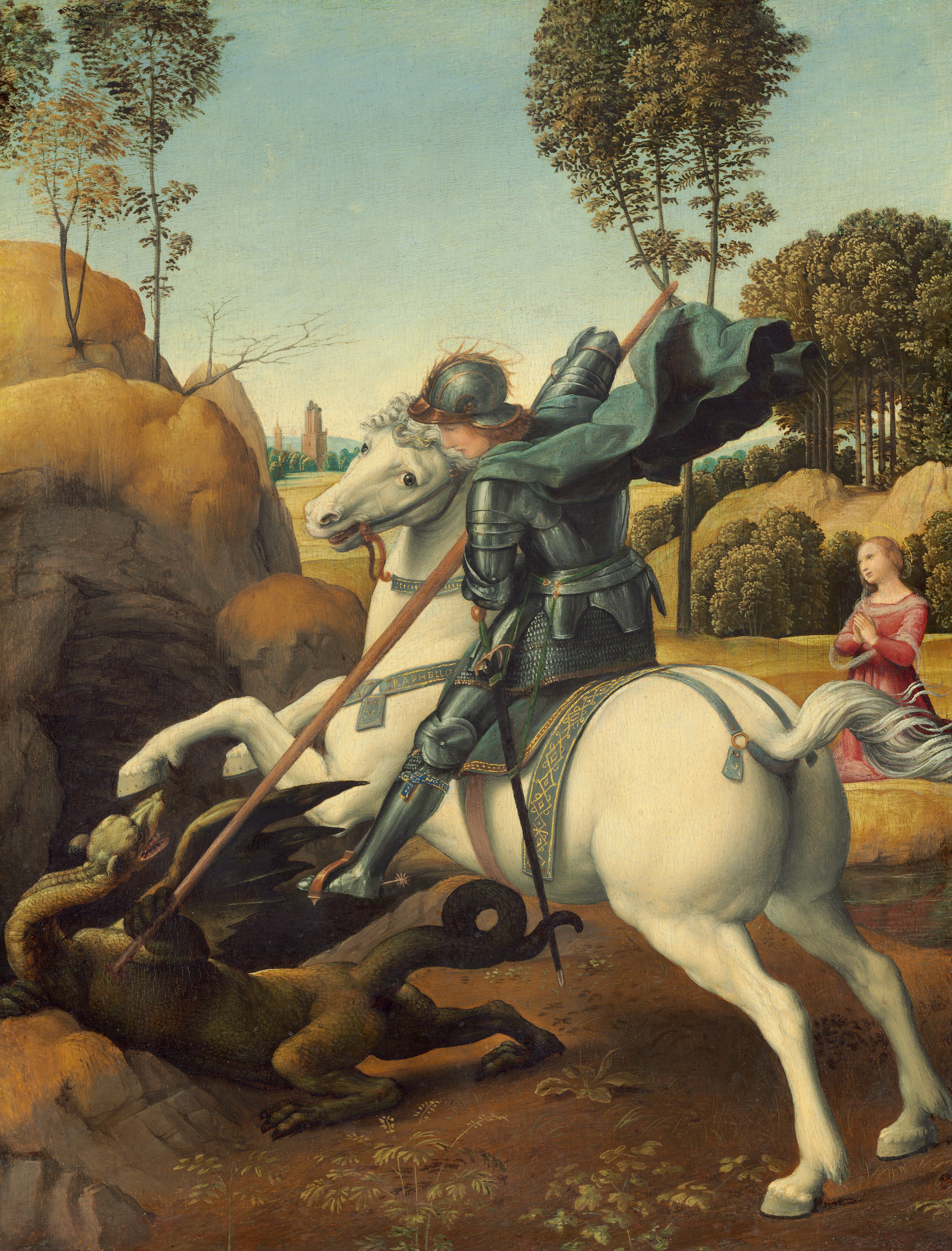
- Saint George and the Dragon; Oil painting by Raphael (1505–1506)
- Observed by: Churches: Roman Catholic Church (see calendar); Lutheran Churches (see calendars); Anglican Communion (see calendars); Eastern Orthodox Church (see calendar); Oriental Orthodox Church (see calendar); Countries and regions: Nations or Regions of which Saint George is the patron saint; Albania; Aragon; Bosnia and Herzegovina; Bulgaria; Catalonia; England; Greece; Georgia; Kosovo; Lebanon; Newfoundland and Labrador; North Macedonia; Palestine; Portugal; Rio de Janeiro; Romania; Serbia; Syria; Hungary
- Type: Feast day; national day of England, national day of Aragon, cultural and romantic national holiday in Catalonia
- Observances: Church services, flying of the St. George's Cross
- Date: 23 April, 24 April, 6 May, 23 November, 25 January
- Frequency: Annual
- Related to: George's Day in Spring; George's Day in Autumn; Catalan Diada de Sant Jordi; English Saint George's Day; Đurđevdan; Palestinian Feast of Saint George

Saint George's Day is the feast day of Saint George, celebrated by Christian churches, countries, regions, and cities from which he is the main patron saint, including England, Ethiopia, Georgia, Catalonia, Aragon, Palestine, Rio de Janeiro, Alcoi, and Genoa, and also where he is an important patron saint, including Albania, Bosnia and Herzegovina, Bulgaria, Greece, Lithuania, Portugal, Romania, Serbia, Syria, and Lebanon.

Saint George's Day is usually celebrated on 23 April, (Note: Some Eastern Christians that use the Julian calendar also celebrate the day on 23 April according to that calendar, which is now May 6 on the Gregorian calendar.) the traditionally accepted date of the saint's death in the Diocletianic Persecution. However Saint’s days are not observed if they fall between Palm Sunday and the second Sunday of Easter, they will then be celebrated the following Monday.

== Date ==
In the calendar of the Lutheran Churches, those of the Anglican Communion, and the General Calendar of the Roman Rite, the feast of Saint George is normally celebrated on 23 April. Since Easter often falls close to Saint George's Day, the church celebration of the feast may be moved from 23 April: for 2011, 2014, 2019, 2022 and 2025 the Lutheran, Anglican and Catholic calendars celebrated Saint George's Day on the first available weekday after the Octave of Easter (see Easter Week) (2 May 2011, 28 April 2014, 29 April 2019, 25 April 2022 and 28 April 2025 respectively).

Common Worship says "When St George's Day ... falls between Palm Sunday and the Second Sunday of Easter inclusive, it is transferred to the Monday after the Second Sunday of Easter" but it does not say what to do if that day is 25 April – normally St Mark's Day. This will next occur in 2033.

The church celebrations of nearly all saints' days are transferred if they fall on a Sunday (because Sunday is the celebration of Christ's Resurrection, which is far more important than a saint's commemoration).

In fact, despite the rule above, the Roman Catholic Church in England and Wales celebrated St George's Day on Tuesday 26 April 2022, with the feast day of St Mark taking precedence and being celebrated on Monday 25 April. The Church of England's Common Worship lectionary for 2022 had the same dates, with St George's Day being celebrated on Tuesday 26 April, according to the image of the physical book shown on social media.

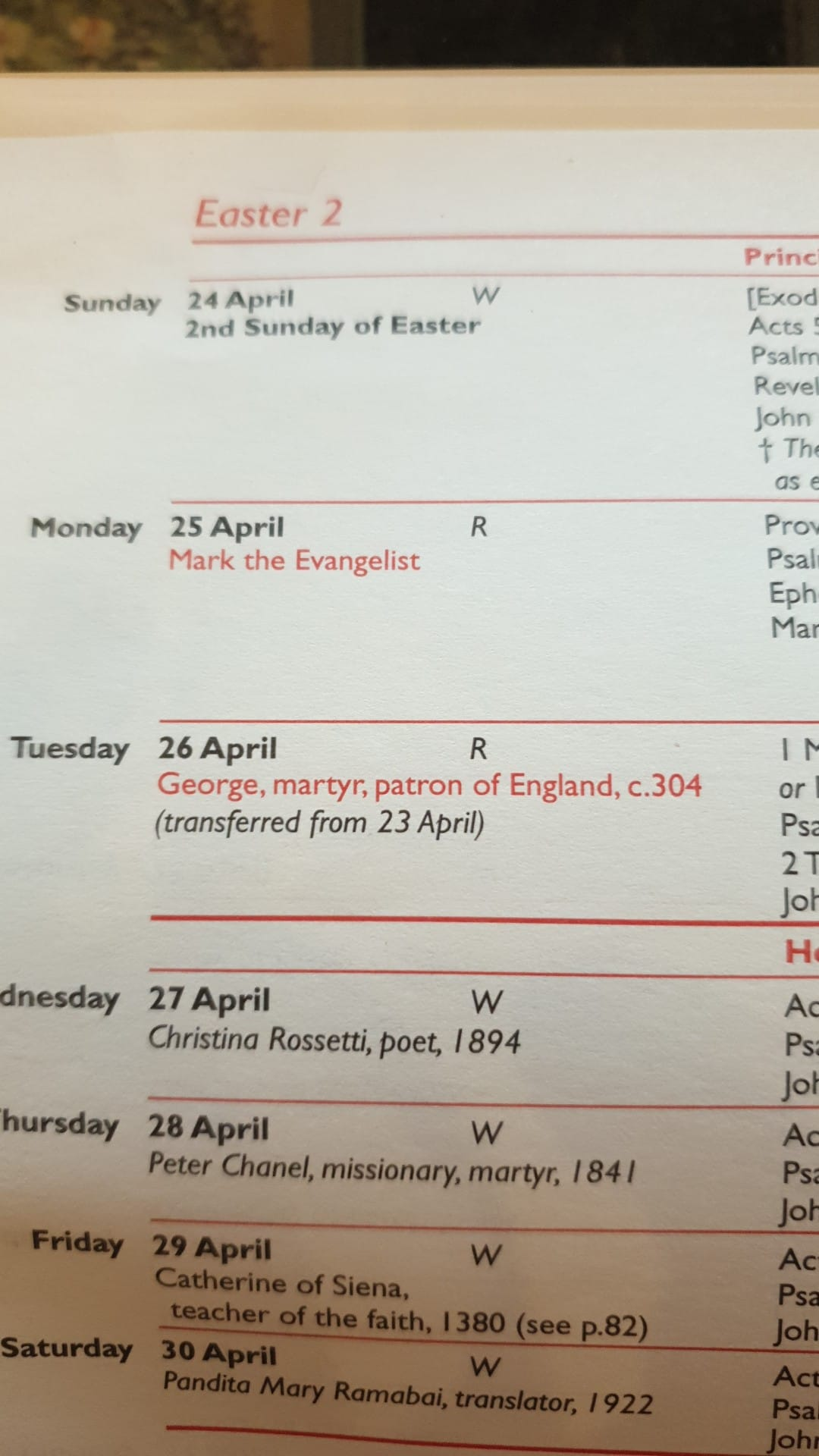

Similarly, the Eastern Orthodox celebration of the feast moves accordingly to the first Monday after Easter or, as it is sometimes called, to the Monday of Bright Week. Besides the 23 April feast, some Orthodox Churches have additional feasts dedicated to St George. The country of Georgia celebrates the feast of St George on 23 April and, more prominently, 10 November (Julian calendar), which until the year 2100 fall on 6 May and 23 November (Gregorian calendar), respectively. The Russian Orthodox Church celebrates the dedication of the Church of St George in Kiev by Yaroslav the Wise in 1051 on 26 November (Julian calendar), which until the year 2100 falls on 9 December on the Gregorian calendar.

Forthcoming years in which the date will be subject to transference in England are 2028 (24 April), 2030 (29 April), 2033 (25 April), 2038 (3 May), 2041 (29 April), 2044 (25 April), 2049 (26 April), 2052 (29 April), 2055 (26 April), 2057 (30 April), 2060 (26 April), 2068 (30 April) and 2071 (27 April).

In the Tridentine calendar Saint George's Day was given the rank of "Semidouble". In Pope Pius XII's 1955 calendar this rank is reduced to "Simple". In Pope John XXIII's 1960 calendar the celebration is just a "Commemoration". In Pope Paul VI's revision of the calendar that came into force in 1969, it was given the equivalent rank of a "Memorial", of optional use. In some countries, such as England, the rank is higher.

== Western Christian tradition ==
=== Evangelical-Lutheran tradition in the Nordic-Baltic region ===
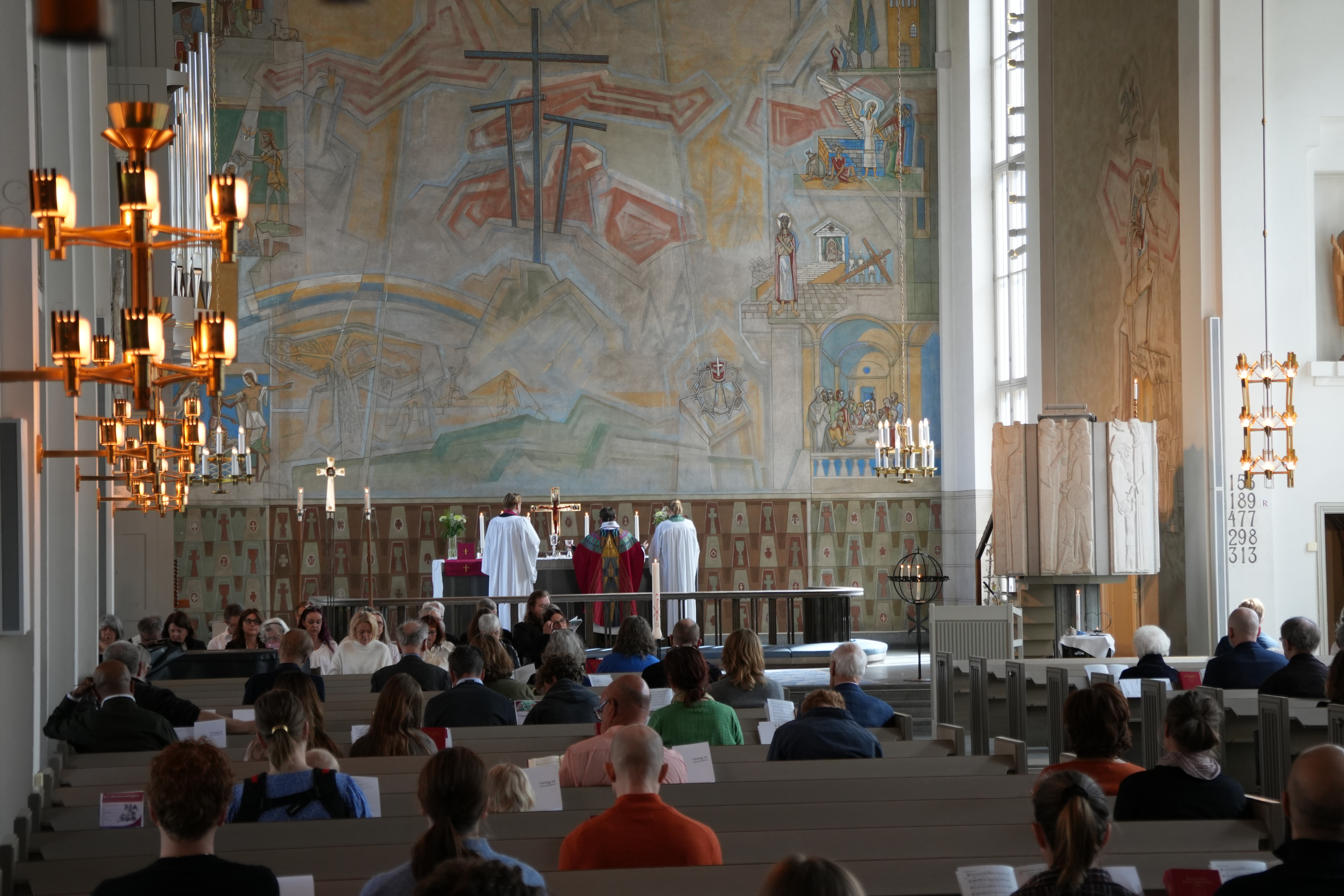
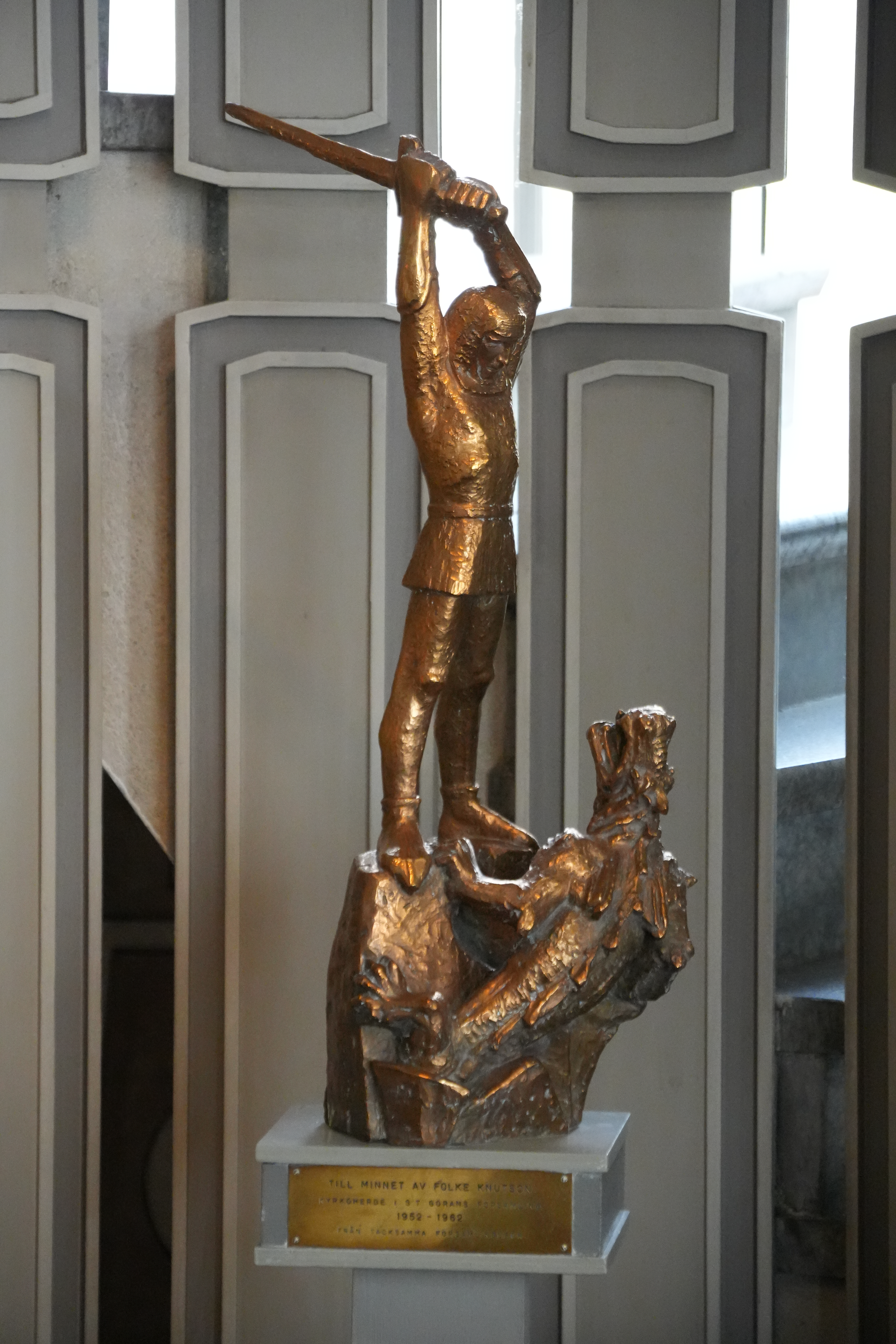
The celebration of Saint George's Day Mass by an Evangelical-Lutheran priest of the Church of Sweden at Saint George's Church in Stockholm (top). A statue of Saint George in Saint George's Church in Stockholm (bottom).

In the Evangelical-Lutheran Churches, Saint George's Day is celebrated on April 23 and churches are named in honour of him. In Evangelical-Lutheran countries, Saint George is widely cherished; in Sweden, Saint George is viewed as one of the nation's patron saints. Throughout Sweden, "On every working day at 12 noon, throughout the land, the ballad of St. George rings out through the radio network; and twice daily in summertime the victory of St. George over evil is re-enacted by the clock figures on the great tower of Stadshuset, the City Hall, in full view of the citizens of Stockholm, the city that was saved from the invading Danes through the aid of the saintly Protector." Saint George's Day, in the Evangelical-Lutheran Church of Sweden, is celebrated through the offering of the Mass, which is often observed on the Sunday nearest to the Feast of Saint George on April 23.

=== English Catholic and Anglican tradition ===
Flag of England, derived from Saint George's Cross

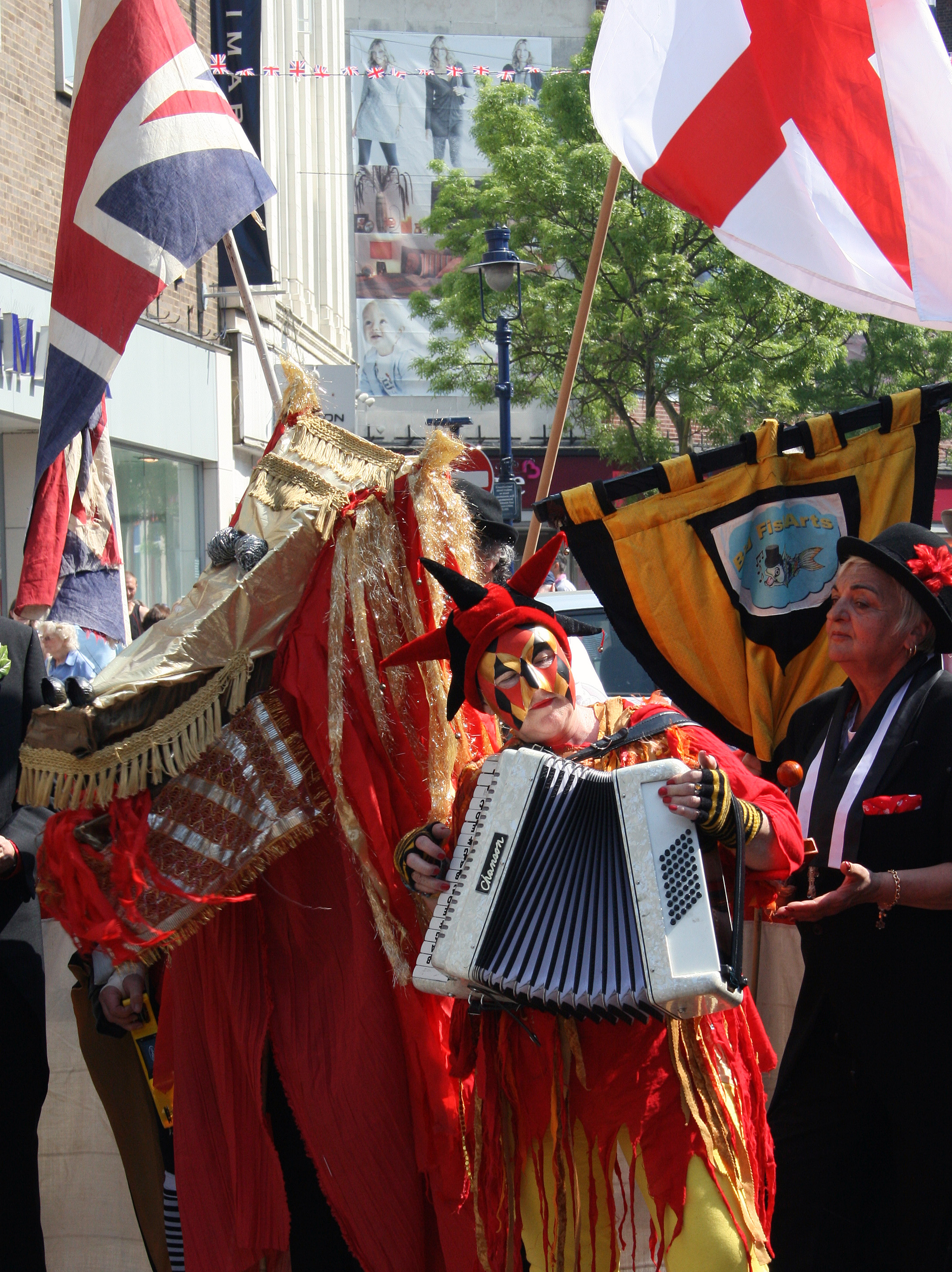
A St. George's Day celebration in Kent, 2011

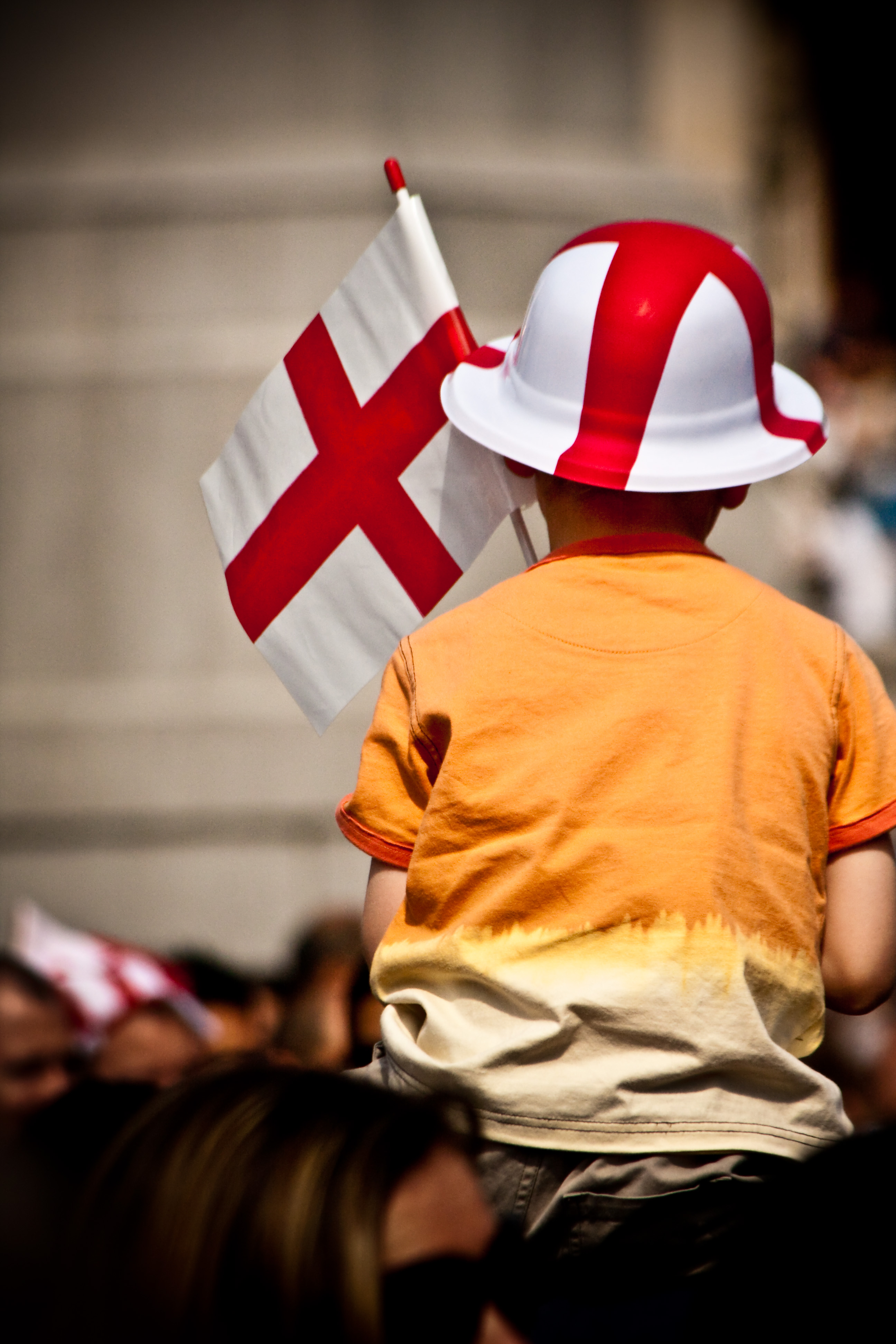
A child with an English flag and hat on St. George's Day

The earliest documented mention of St. George in England comes from the venerable Bede (c. 673–735). His feast day is also mentioned in the Durham Collectar, a ninth-century liturgical work. The will of Alfred the Great is said to refer to the saint, in a reference to the church of Fordington, Dorset. At Fordington a stone over the south door records the miraculous appearance of St. George to lead crusaders into battle. Early (c. 10th century) dedications of churches to St. George are noted in England, for example at Fordingham, Dorset, at Thetford, Southwark and Doncaster. In the past, historians mistakenly pointed to the Synod of Oxford in 1222 as elevating the feast to special prominence, but the earliest manuscripts of the synod's declaration do not mention the feast of St. George. The declarations of the Province of Canterbury in 1415 and the Province of York in 1421 elevated the feast to a double major, and as a result, work was prohibited and church attendance was mandatory. Edward III (1327–1377) put his Order of the Garter (founded c. 1348) under the banner of St. George. This order is still the foremost order of knighthood in England and St. George's Chapel at Windsor Castle was built by Edward IV and Henry VII in honour of the order. The badge of the Order shows Saint George on horseback slaying the dragon. Froissart observed the English invoking St. George as a battle cry on several occasions during the Hundred Years' War (1337–1453). Certain English soldiers also displayed the pennon of St. George.

[1552] wher as it hathe bene of ane olde costome that sent Gorge shulde be kepte holy day thorrow alle Englond, the byshoppe of London commandyd that it shulde not be kepte, and no more it was not.

— Chronicle of the Grey Friars of London, 1852

St. George's Day was a major feast and national holiday in England on a par with Christmas from the early 15th century. The tradition of celebration St. George's day had waned by the end of the 18th century after the union of England and Scotland. Nevertheless, the link with St. George continues today, for example Salisbury holds an annual St. George's Day pageant, the origins of which are believed to go back to the 13th century. In recent years the popularity of St. George's Day appears to be increasing gradually. BBC Radio 3 had a full programme of St. George's Day events in 2006, and Andrew Rosindell, Conservative MP for Romford, has been putting the argument forward in the House of Commons to make St. George's Day a public holiday. In early 2009, Mayor of London Boris Johnson spearheaded a campaign to encourage the celebration of St. George's Day, and during the 2017 and 2019 General Elections the Labour Party campaigned for it to be a public holiday. Today, St. George's day may be celebrated with anything English including morris dancing and Punch and Judy shows.

A traditional custom on St. George's day is to fly or adorn the St. George's Cross flag in some way: pubs in particular can be seen on 23 April festooned with garlands of St. George's crosses. It is customary for the hymn "Jerusalem" to be sung in cathedrals, churches and chapels on St. George's Day, or on the Sunday closest to it.

There is a growing reaction to the recent indifference to St. George's Day. Organisations such as English Heritage and the Royal Society of St. George have been encouraging celebrations. There have also been calls to replace St. George as patron saint of England on the grounds that he was an obscure figure who had no direct connection with the country. However, there is no obvious consensus as to whom to replace him with, though names suggested include Edmund the Martyr, Cuthbert of Lindisfarne, or Saint Alban, with the last having topped a BBC Radio 4 poll on the subject. Recently there have been calls to reinstate St. Edmund as the patron Saint of England as he was displaced by George some 400 years ago.

Religious observance of St. George's day changes when it is too close to Easter. According to the Church of England's calendar, when St. George's Day falls between Palm Sunday and the Second Sunday of Easter inclusive, it is moved to the Monday after the Second Sunday of Easter. In 2011, for example, 23 April was Holy Saturday, so St. George's Day was moved to Monday 2 May. The Catholic Church in England and Wales has a similar practice.

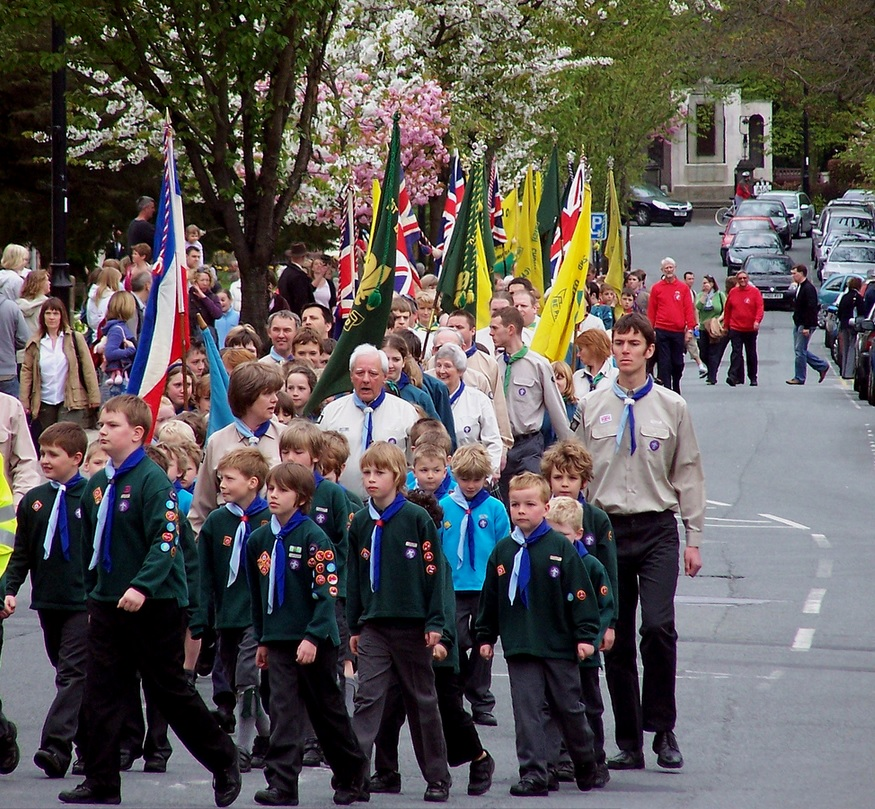
A St. George's Day Scouts parade in West Yorkshire, England

Saint George is the patron saint of The Scout Movement, which has held St. George's Day parades since its first years. St. George is the patron saint of many other organisations. In the United States, the National Catholic Committee on Scouting uses the saint for many of their awards and activities.

In sport, 23 April is also the anniversary of the St. George Dragons Rugby League Football Club. The St. George club coincidentally played their inaugural New South Wales Rugby League first grade match on St. George's Day, 23 April 1921 at the Sydney Sports Ground in Australia.

In Newfoundland and Labrador, St. George's Day is a provincial holiday, usually observed on the Monday nearest 23 April.

=== Hungary ===
The coat of arms of the Order of Saint George

St George's Day has a rich culture in Hungary, and in many regions it is one of the biggest celebrations, and was believed to hold mystical power. On this day, there was often a feast bigger than a wedding feast. It was a day of magical practices, forest walks and ritual bathing. They believed that this day marked the beginning of the real Spring. Celebrations, puppet shows and the appearance of the world's first secular order of knights, the Order of Saint George (Hungarian: Szent György Vitézi Lovagrend, "Vitézly Order of Cavalry of Saint George") are common.

According to the Hungarians, the witches held their Witches Sabbath this day. Witches were believed to congregate on mountains, such as Gellért Hill. On this day, willow or birch twigs were put in windows and stables, incense was burnt around them (and sometimes onion garlands were hung), to ward off curses. The animals were given herbs and enchanted pogácsa, believed to have special properties.

Superstition said, whoever's gate jambs were carved by witches that night, that meant his cows milk was taken away. Dojdole traditions are also held this day. Similarly to this ritual, in other areas, girls, shepherds and sheep were thrown water at, not for rain but cow-milk stimulation.

The Roman Palilia, pagan shepherd's festival was the basis for later animal herding rituals. Many pastoral customs can be observed on this day. To ward off evil spirits and witches and to charm fertility, cattle were driven through on chains, axes or other objects. In Szeklerland Saint George's day fire was used instead. Shepherds were contracted on this day and offered eggs, szalonna, wine and pálinka and sing together.

It was not just a day of knighthood, folk celebration and the lifting of curses. It was for a reason that this day was thought to be of the Sabbath, St. George's Day was considered by Hungarian folklore to be a time for casting spells, when rituals were particularly powerful. This day, people were capable of dew-picking(harmatszedés). It was believed that dew squeezed from the field into the pot multiplied the butter. Fertility could also be 'stolen'. If you stole dew from a field that was growing well and then wiped it on your own lawn, you could steal the fertility of their land.

But one must be careful, because at the dawn of Saint George's day the witches are also stealing dew, so you might catch a glimpse of them at road junctions. There are other supernatural beings to watch out for on this day. The Szépasszony spirits on this day, trick people and braid or entangle horses' manes. This can be guarded against by sprinkling blessed poppy seeds around the horses, saying:

Szépasszony, akkor fond be a lovam sörényit, ha ezt a mákot megolvastad!

by which you obligate the spirit to count all of them.

This day enables mortals to cast many other spells: for example, catching a snake on this day can give you great physical strength, but losing it will weaken you.

It was also considered a day for walking in the woods and treasure hunting. In Berettyóújfalu, it was believed that every seventh year, flames would burst out of the ground, revealing treasure, guarded by an old man (presumably a ghost or goblin).

Popular courses for the feast this day include: mutton pörkölt, Hungarian-grey-goulash, mangalitsa skewers.

=== Iberian peninsula ===
==== Aragon, Catalonia and Valencia ====
Cross of Alcoraz. This shield appears in the official Coat of arms of Aragon and the Flag of Sardinia

Saint George became the patron saint of the former Crown of Aragon, when King Peter I of Aragon won the Battle of Alcoraz in 1096 commending his army and people to the auspices of the saint. He is also patron of several former territories under the Crown of Aragon, including Aragon, Catalonia, Valencia, Sicily, Sardinia, and several regions of Italy. The international expansion of the Crown that followed over the next two centuries across the Mediterranean also led to the adoption of the cross of Saint George as a coat of arms by Christian Crusaders.

On 23 April (Saint George's day) Aragon celebrates its "Día de Aragón" ('Day of Aragon').

In Catalonia, the Diada de Sant Jordi (Catalan for "Saint George's Day") involves traditions similar to those of Valentine's Day in Anglophone countries. A celebration established in the Principality of Catalonia in the Late Middle Ages, in modern times boys give girls a red rose and girls give boys a book on this day, although today the exchange of books and roses regardless of gender is also customary. Among roses, many piles of books are for sale in Catalan streets; 1.5m books were sold in 2015. Despite being a working day, it is regarded as one of Catalan national holidays due to its overwhelming popularity.

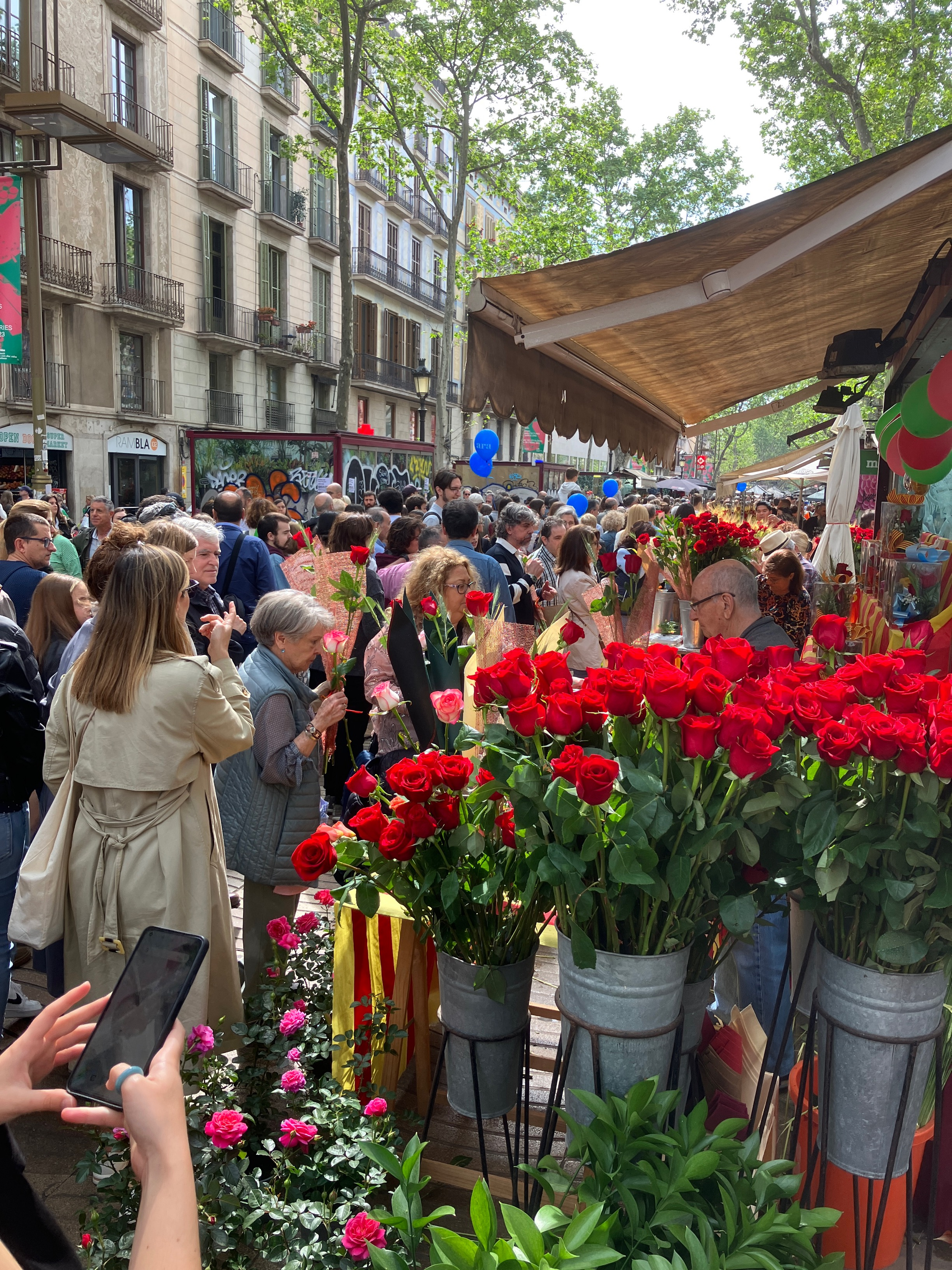
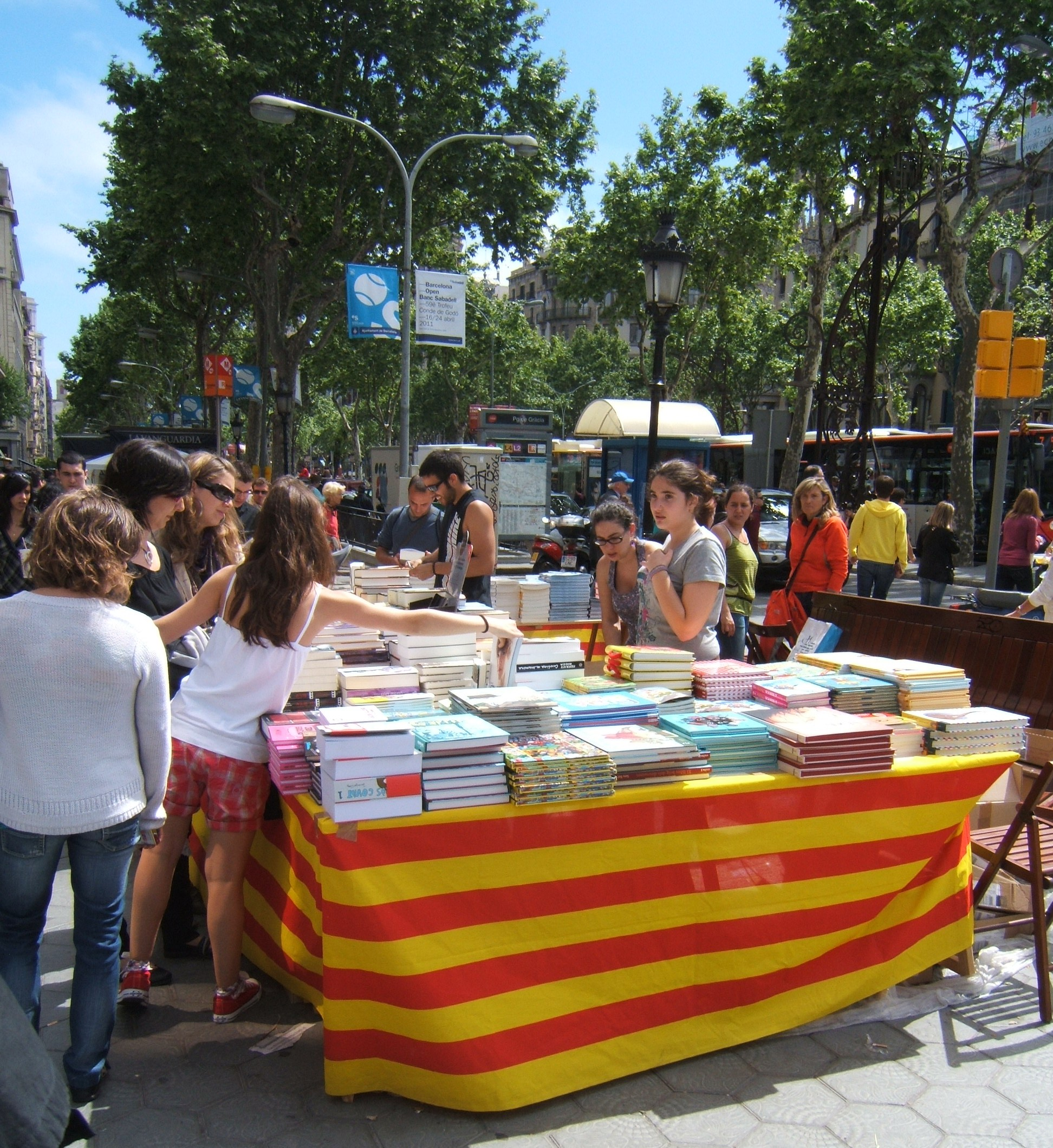
Scenes of Saint George's Day in Catalonia. Left: Selling roses on April 23, 2023, Barcelona. Right: Book selling in Passeig de Gràcia, Barcelona, 2020

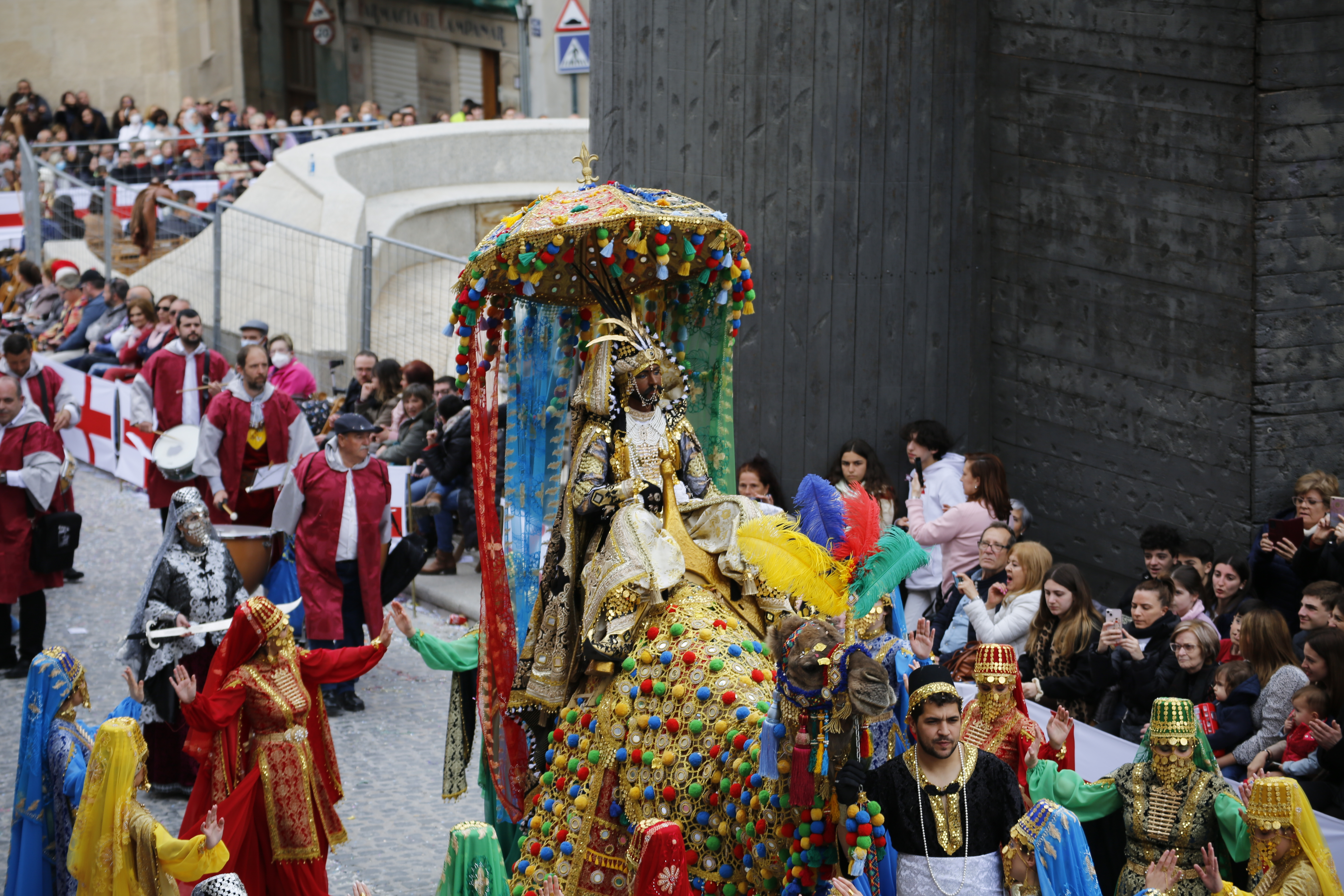
Moors and Christians of Alcoi, 2022.

In the Valencian city of Alcoi, Saint George's Day is commemorated as a thanksgiving celebration for the purported aid the saint provided to the Christian troops fighting the Muslims in the siege of the city. Its citizens commemorate the day with a festivity in which thousands of people parade in medieval costumes, forming two "armies" of Moors and Christians and re-enacting the siege that gave the city to the Christians.

==== Rest of Spain ====
In Cáceres, in the western region of Extremadura, the capital city of Cáceres celebrates the reconquest of the city from Muslim rule on 23 April 1229 by King Alfonso IX of León, with commemorative celebrations which begin on the eve of the feast day with a parade of Moors and Christians and various effigies of Saint George and the Dragon on horseback. Once the parade reaches the main square, they reenact a battle between both camps culminating with the burning of a winning Dragon effigy (as selected and voted by the people of the city).

The town Viérnoles in Cantabria celebrates several days of "Las Fiestas de San Jorge" at the end of April and/or the beginning of May.

==== Portugal ====
Devotions to Saint George in Portugal date back to the twelfth century, and Saint Constable attributed the victory of the Portuguese against what is now mostly modern day Spain, in the battle of Aljubarrota in the fourteenth century to Saint George. During the reign of King John I (1357–1433) Saint George became the patron saint of Portugal and the King ordered that the saint's image on the horse be carried in the Feast of Corpus Christi procession. In fact, the Portuguese Army motto means Portugal and Saint George, in perils and in efforts of war.

=== Germany Georgiritt ===
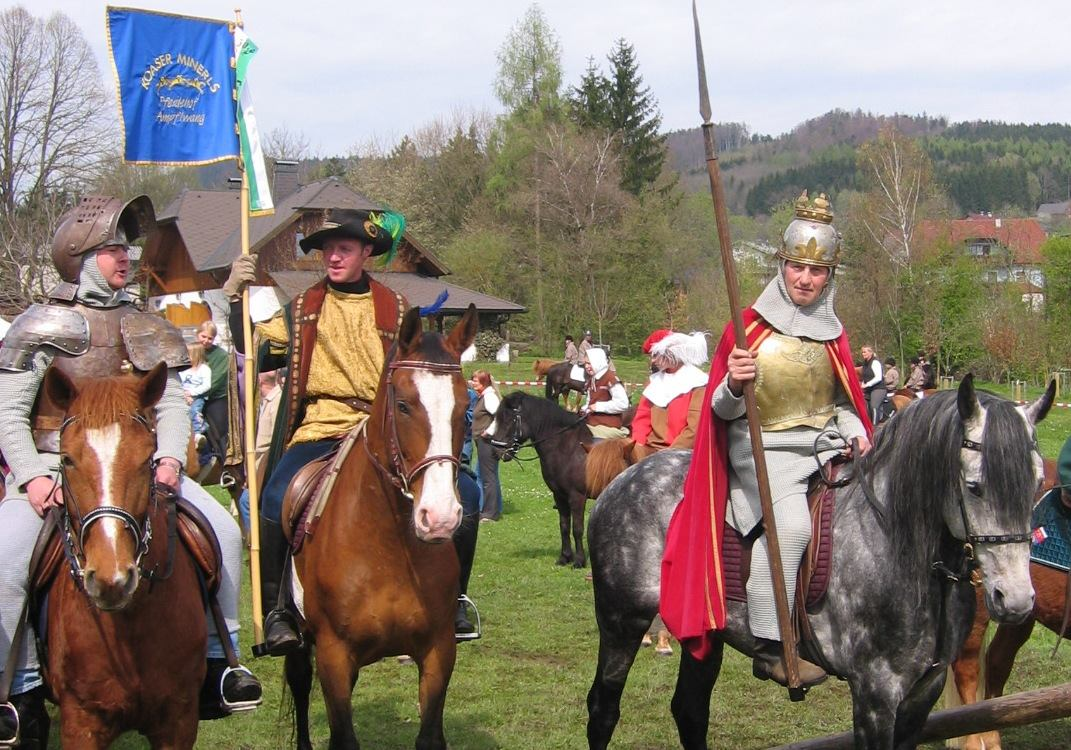
Georgiritt

In tradition-rich Buttenheim and many other towns in Bavaria, Georgiritt (plural Georgiritte; "George's Ride") takes place around St. George's Day 23. April, especially around churches dedicated to the saint. Brightly decorated horses and wagons parade several times around the church, in which a service is then held at which the riders and horses are blessed. Various competitions may be held afterwards.

=== Rio de Janeiro ===
Patron Saint of the Brazilian Army Cavalry, Saint George is celebrated in a horseback riding throughout the country. In Rio de Janeiro, where the saint is extremely popular, is a day of popular festivities, such as feijoada, fireworks, among other celebrations.

On April 23, the churches begin their festivities at 3:30 am with a moment of Adoration of the Blessed Sacrament. Soon after, around 4 am, the façade takes on new colors with a mapped projection show and light show. The presentation precedes the traditional fireworks display and the solemn mass of "Alvorada de São Jorge", at 5 am.

=== 24 April ===
Exceptionally in the Czech Republic, Hungary and Slovakia, Saint George's Day comes on 24 April. The reason why it was moved from 23 April in case of the Czech's svátek sv. Jiří is, that there is a day of St. Adalbert of Prague (in Czech Svatý Vojtěch), Czech national patron saint, who was martyred on 23 April 997. It is celebrated in a special way.

In Hungary, 24 April is the day of Saint George the Dragonslayer, thus it is the name day of men named György. It is also the Day of the Police, who honour him as a patron saint.

== Eastern Orthodox tradition ==
Under the state atheism of former Eastern Bloc countries, the celebration of Saint George's Day was historically suppressed.

If St. George's Day falls during Great Lent or Holy Week or on Easter Day, it is observed on Easter Monday.

=== Eastern Slavic tradition ===
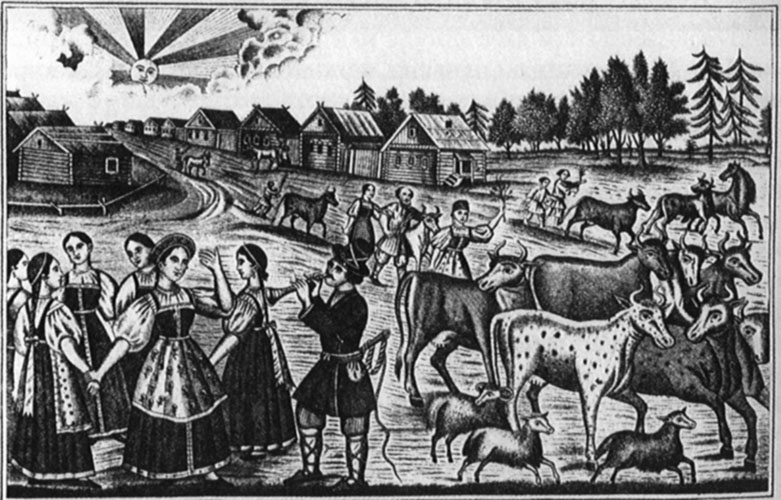
19th-century illustration of the Spring Yuri's Day in Russia

The Russian Orthodox Church, which uses the Julian calendar, has two important feasts of Saint George. Besides the feast of 23 April (Julian calendar), common through all Christendom, Russians also celebrate the anniversary of the dedication of the Church of St. George in Kiev by Yaroslav the Wise (1051) on 26 November (Julian calendar), which currently falls on 9 December. One of the Russian forms of the name George being Yuri, the two feasts are popularly known as Vesenniy Yuriev Den (Yuri's Day in the Spring) and Osenniy Yuriev Den (Yuri's Day in the Fall).

=== South Slavic tradition and Balkan spring festival ===
In Serbian, St. George's Day is called Đurđevdan (Cyrillic: Ђурђевдан) and is celebrated on 6 May every year, as the Serbian Orthodox Church uses the Julian, Old Style calendar. St. George's Day is one of the most common Slavas (family patron day) among the Serbs. Đurđevdan is also celebrated by both Orthodox and Muslim Romani and Muslim Gorani. Đurđevdan is celebrated, especially, in the areas of Raška in Serbia. Apart from being the Slava of many families, St. George's Day is marked by morning picnics, music, and folk dances.

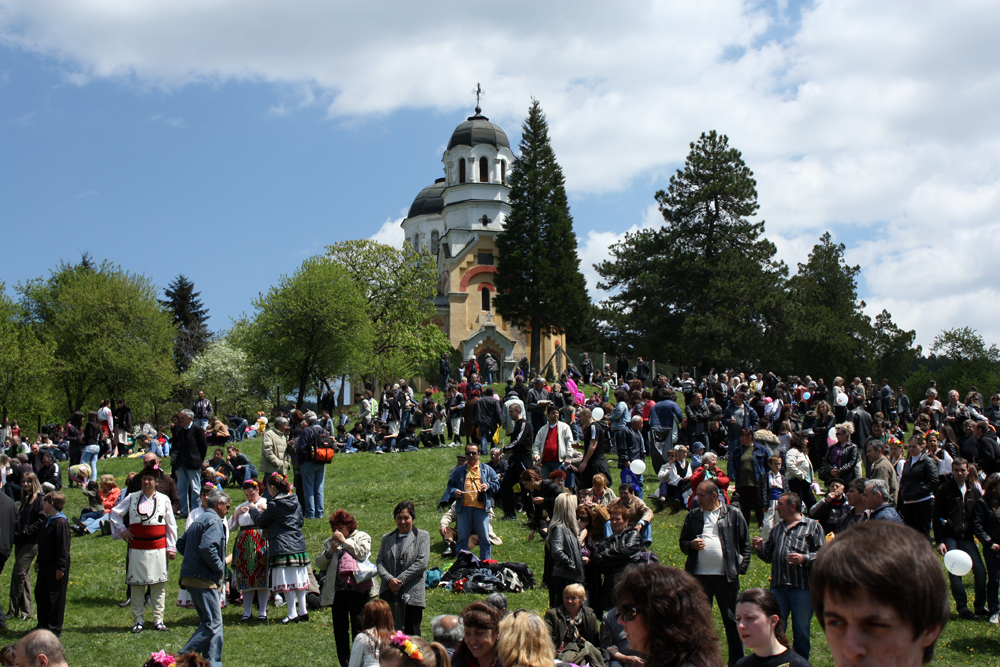
Saint George's Day celebrations in Bulgaria

Possibly the most celebrated name day in Bulgaria, St. George's Day (Гергьовден, Gergyovden) is a public holiday that takes place on 6 May each year. A common ritual is to prepare and eat a whole lamb, which is an ancient practice possibly related to Slavic pagan sacrificial traditions and the fact that St. George is the patron saint of shepherds. It is also believed to be a magical day when all evil spells can be broken. It was believed that the saint helps the crops to grow and blesses the morning dew, so early in the morning they walked in the pastures and meadows and collected dew, washed their face, hands and feet in it for good luck and even in some rural parts of Bulgaria it was a custom to roll in it naked.

St. George's Day is also Bulgarian Armed Forces Day, made official with a decree of Prince Alexander of Battenberg on 9 January 1880. Parades are organised in the capital Sofia to present the best of the equipment and manpower of the Bulgarian military, as well as in major cities nationwide.

St. George's Day is also called Đurđevdan and is celebrated by Bosnian Serbs and Romani (both Orthodox and Muslim), but also has been celebrated by the other ethnic groups in Bosnia and Herzegovina. Đurđevdan's widespread appeal can be seen in the folk song Đurđevdan popularised by Bijelo Dugme as well as Meša Selimović's novel Death and the Dervish.

In the Greek Orthodox Church, Saint George's Day is celebrated on 23 April, unless this date falls during Lent or Holy Week when it is celebrated on the day following Easter. Other, lesser saints are commemorated during Lent or Holy Week on their usual dates. However, because of St. George's standing as one of the church's most venerated megalomartyrs the celebration date is moved outside of Lent and Holy Week so that people can fully celebrate the day.

In the Georgian Church, St. George the Victory-Bearer is commemorated twice a year: on 23 November (the Breaking on the Wheel of Holy Greatmartyr George) and 6 May (the Beheading of St. George). The celebrations likely began in the 4th to 5th centuries. In Georgia, the feast day on 23 November is credited to Saint Nino of Cappadocia, who in Georgian hagiography is a relative of St. George, and is primarily credited with bringing Christianity to the Georgians in the fourth century.

The Romanian Orthodox Church, which uses the Revised Julian calendar, celebrates St. George's Day on 23 April.

== Middle East ==
Veneration of St. George as a martyr originates in the Levant, spread from Palestine through Lebanon to the rest of the Byzantine Empire – though the martyr is not mentioned in the Syriac Breviarium. A titular church built in Lydda during the reign of Constantine the Great (reigned 306–37) was consecrated to "a man of the highest distinction"; the identity of this man with St. George was asserted by the 7th century. The church was destroyed by Muslims in 1010, but was later rebuilt and dedicated to Saint George by the Crusaders. In 1191 and during the conflict known as the Third Crusade (1189–92), the church was again destroyed by the forces of Saladin, Sultan of the Ayyubid dynasty (reigned 1171–93). A new church was erected in 1872 and is still standing.

Christians in the Middle East continue to celebrate St. George's Day, and the custom has been adopted in Muslim tradition via identification of the saint with the figure of Al-Khidr and an association in folk belief with medicine and healing. In Palestinian culture, the feast is held on 5 May. The feast is held in the Palestinian town of al-Khader, just south of Bethlehem. Historically, the feast attracted even non Christians throughout Palestine to visit the Monastery of Saint George. On the morning of 6 May, Palestinian Christians from Beit Jala, Bethlehem, Beit Sahour and other parts of Palestine would march in a procession to the monastery.

In Mosul, northern Iraq, St. George's Monastery was destroyed in November 2014 by ISIS militants.

Saint George's Day (Jeries) is celebrated widely in Jordan, especially in a town near Amman called Fuheis. In Jordan, many churches are dedicated to St. George.

St. George's Day is celebrated throughout Iraq and Lebanon, but especially in towns and villages where churches for St. George have been erected.

Many Christian denominations in Syria celebrate St. George's Day, especially in the Homs Governorate. Following this, participants traditionally dine and dance.

== In literature ==
In the 1897 book Dracula by Bram Stoker, evil things are said to occur on St. George's Eve, beginning at midnight. The date of St. George's Day presented in the book, 5 May (on the Western Gregorian calendar), is St. George's Day as observed by the Eastern Orthodox churches of that era. The belief is that moroi (living vampires), witches, and other dark creatures must gather all the evil power they can between midnight and the dawn of the saint's holy day, so it is unsafe to go outside on that night.

"Do you know what day it is?" I answered that it was the fourth of May. She shook her head as she said again: "Oh, yes! I know that, I know that! but do you know what day it is?" On my saying that I did not understand, she went on: "It is the eve of St. George's Day. Do you not know that tonight, when the clock strikes midnight, all the evil things in the world will have full sway?

— Dracula (1897), Chapter 1, Jonathan Harker's Journal, 4 May

The 1961 play Andorra by Max Frisch focusses greatly on the (fictionalised) Andorran celebrations of St. George's Day. The play begins and ends with references to a ceremonial whitewashing of houses by the town's virgins, again reflecting the day's central theme of purity.

The 2009 play Jerusalem by Jez Butterworth takes place on St. George's Day, 23 April, also the day of death and estimated birth day of William Shakespeare.

Lee Sheridan's debut novella St George's Day, set in Maynooth on 23 April 2020, examines the day in the life of a part-time supermarket worker.
