= Spring rite of Juraŭski Karahod =

Spring rite of Juraŭski Karahod Юраўскі карагод
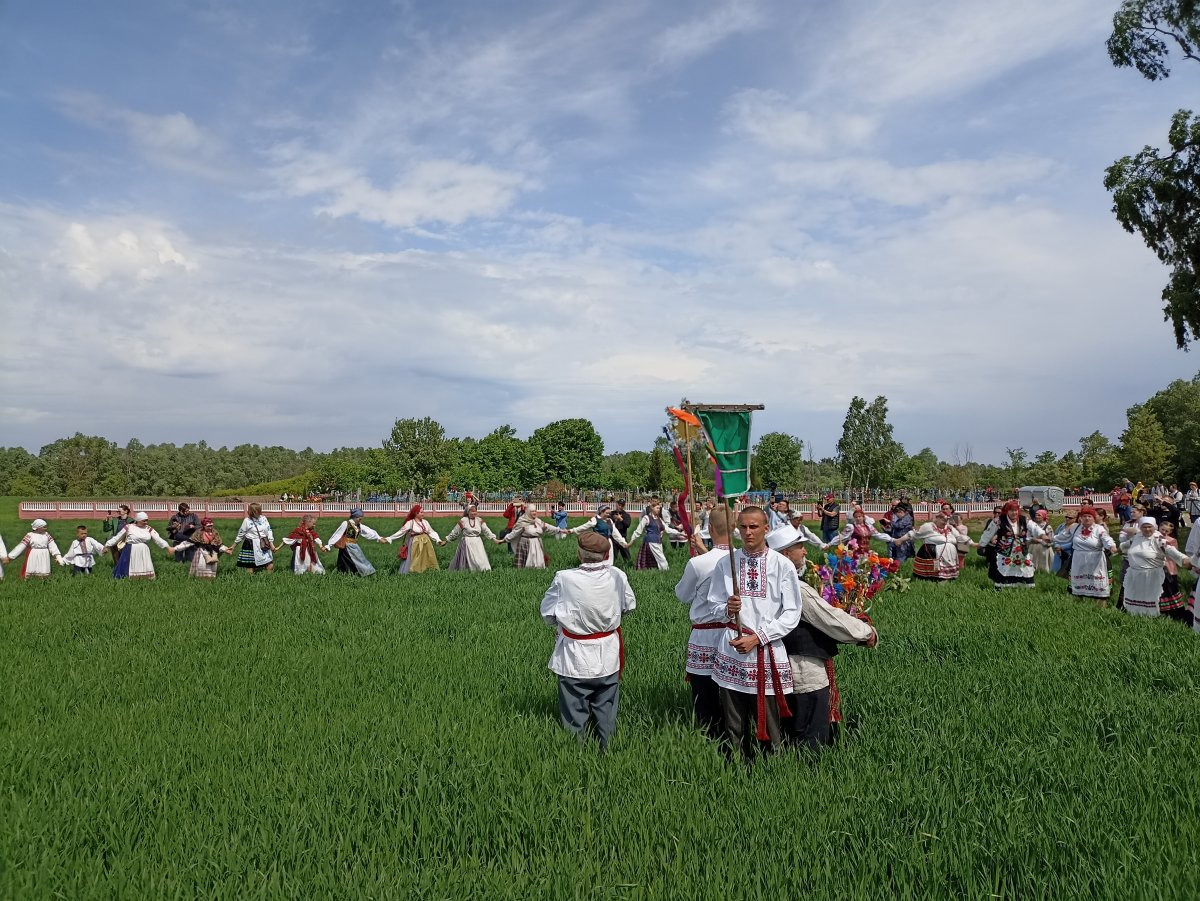
- Date: George's Day
- Frequency: Annual
- Locations: Pahost, Belarus

Spring rite of Juraŭski Karahod
- UNESCO Intangible Cultural Heritage
- Country: Belarus
- Reference: 01458
- Region: Europe and North America

Inscription history
- Inscription: 2019 (14th session)
- List: Need of Urgent Safeguarding

Spring rite of Juraŭski Karahod (Belarusian: Вясновы абрад "Юраўскі карагод") is a ritual performed by the residents of Pahost village, Žytkavičy District, Homieĺ Region, Belarus on St. George's Day. In 2019, it was inscribed on the UNESCO List of Intangible Cultural Heritage in Need of Urgent Safeguarding.
