= Jüri Kallas =

Estonian writer, translator and editor

Jüri Kallas (born 20 April 1967) is an Estonian science fiction expert, translator, publisher and editor. Jüri Kallas has worked for publishers Elmatar and Fantaasia as a compiler and editor. He is currently working on handing out the Estonian Science Fiction Association award Stalker, developing the Estonian science fiction bibliography and is an active contributor for the online science-fiction magazine Reaktor. He has written afterwords for novels and collections. He has translated into Estonian texts by Vladimir Arenev, Alexander Belyaev, Kir Bulychev, Robert E. Howard, Rafał Kosik, Henry Kuttner, H. P. Lovecraft, H. L. Oldie, Viktor Pelevin, Alexandr Siletsky, Mikhail Uspensky, Ilya Varshavsky and others. In addition, Jüri Kallas has worked for different publishers, choosing and editing dozens of crime and romance novels and written forewords for them. He has also published literature criticism and his views and opinions about current political events in Estonia. He has been an editorial board member of the online magazine Algernon.

== Publications ==
=== Anthologies (compiler) ===
- "Olend väljastpoolt meie maailma" (Öölane) Tartu: Elmatar, 1995
- "Stalker 2002" (Maailma fantastikakirjanduse tippteoseid) Tartu: Fantaasia, 2002

=== Collections (compiler and/or foreword) ===
- H. P. Lovecraft "Pimeduses sosistaja" (Öölane) Tartu: Elmatar, 1996
- Robert E. Howard "Conan ja Musta ranniku kuninganna" (Tempus fugit) Tartu: Elmatar, 1999
- Robert E. Howard "Conan ja värelev vari" (Tempus fugit) Tartu: Elmatar, 2000
- Robert E. Howard "Conan ja punane kants" (Tempus fugit) Tartu: Elmatar, 2000
- Veiko Belials "Helesiniste Liivade laul" (Maailma fantastikakirjanduse tippteoseid) Tartu: Fantaasia, 2002
- Indrek Hargla "Hathawareti teener" (Maailma fantaasiakirjanduse tippteosed) Tartu: Fantaasia, 2002
- Robert E. Howard "Pimeduse rahvas" (Maailma fantaasiakirjanduse tippteosed) Tartu: Fantaasia, 2002
- H. G. Wells "Mister Skelmersdale haldjamaal" (Hea tuju raamat) Tartu: Fantaasia, 2002
- Robert E. Howard "Aed täis hirmu" (Maailma fantastikakirjanduse tippteoseid) Tartu: Fantaasia, 2003
- Stephen King "Kõik on mõeldav: 14 sünget lugu" Tallinn: Pegasus, 2003
- Stephen King "Kõik on mõeldav: 14 sünget lugu" Tallinn: Pegasus, 2005
- Indrek Hargla "Suudlevad vampiirid" (Eesti fantastikakirjanduse tippteosed) Tartu: Fantaasia, 2011

=== Novels (afterwords) ===
- Isaac Asimov "Teine Asum" Tallinn: Eesti Raamat, 1996
- Roger Zelazny "Valguse Isand" (Öölane) Tartu: Elmatar, 1997
- Robert A. Heinlein "Nukkude isandad" (Tempus fugit) Tartu: Elmatar, 1998
- Robert Silverberg "Aja maskid" (Tempus fugit) Tartu: Elmatar, 1998
- Ray Bradbury "Vist on kuri tulekul" (Tempus fugit) Tartu: Elmatar, 1999
- Arthur C. Clarke "Lapsepõlve lõpp" (Tempus fugit) Tartu: Elmatar, 1999
- Philip K. Dick "Blade Runner: Kas androidid unistavad elektrilammastest?" (42) Tallinn: Tänapäev, 2001
- Kurt Vonnegut "Kassikangas" (42) Tallinn: Tänapäev, 2001
- Michael Moorcock "Saatusemerel purjetaja" (Maailma fantaasiakirjanduse tippteoseid) Tartu: Fantaasia, 2002
- Tiit Tarlap "Meie, kromanjoonlased" (Ulmeguru soovitab) Pärnu: Ji, 2009

== Appearances ==
- 5. märts 2013 lennukisadamas https://www.youtube.com/watch?v=m9_QO1Z7f6s Mereulmest, teadusulmest
- 13. detsember 2014 Tartu kirjanike majas https://www.youtube.com/watch?v=Jm_Mqi2jW7Y Ulmegeto – vajadus või paratamatus
- 19. juuli 2014 Estcon https://www.youtube.com/watch?v=vvyKUaD-cTs Ulmeraamatute kaanekujundused maailmas

== Sources ==
- Eesti Wikipedia
- Raamatukoi raamatupood
- Kirjastus Elmatar
- 16 küsimust Jüri kallasele
- kirjed e-kataloogis Ester
