= Juri De Marco =

Italian football goalkeeper

Personal information
- Date of birth: 12 July 1984 (age 42)
- Place of birth: Benevento, Italy
- Height: 1.82 m (5 ft 11 1/2 in)
- Position: Goalkeeper

Team information
- Current team: Perugia
- Number: 12

Senior career*
| Years | Team | Apps | (Gls) |
| 2004–2006 | Avellino | 0 | (0) |
| 2006–2007 | Giugliano | 24 | (0) |
| 2007–2009 | Avellino | 1 | (0) |
| Jan. 2009 | Perugia Calcio | 2 | (0) |
- * Club domestic league appearances and goals as of 23 November 2007

Juri De Marco (born 12 July 1979 in Benevento) is an Italian football goalkeeper who currently plays for Perugia Calcio.

== Appearances on Italian Series ==
Serie B : 1 app

Serie C1 : 2 apps

Serie C2 : 24 apps

Total : 27 apps
