= Jüri Kaver =

Estonian politician (born 1974)

Jüri Kaver (27 February 1974 in Võru) is an Estonian politician. He was a member of IX Riigikogu and former mayor Võru from 21 April 2011 to 11 November 2013.
