= Vrtovac =

- Village
- Location within Serbia
- Coordinates: 43°24′14″N 22°27′33″E
- Country: Serbia
- District: Zaječar District
- Municipality: Knjaževac

Population (2002)
  - Total: 218
- Time zone: UTC+1 (CET)
  - Summer (DST): UTC+2 (CEST)

Vrtovac is a village in the municipality of Knjaževac, Serbia. According to the 2002 census, the village has a population of 218 people.
