= Jaan Truusmann =

Estonian teacher (1866–1932)

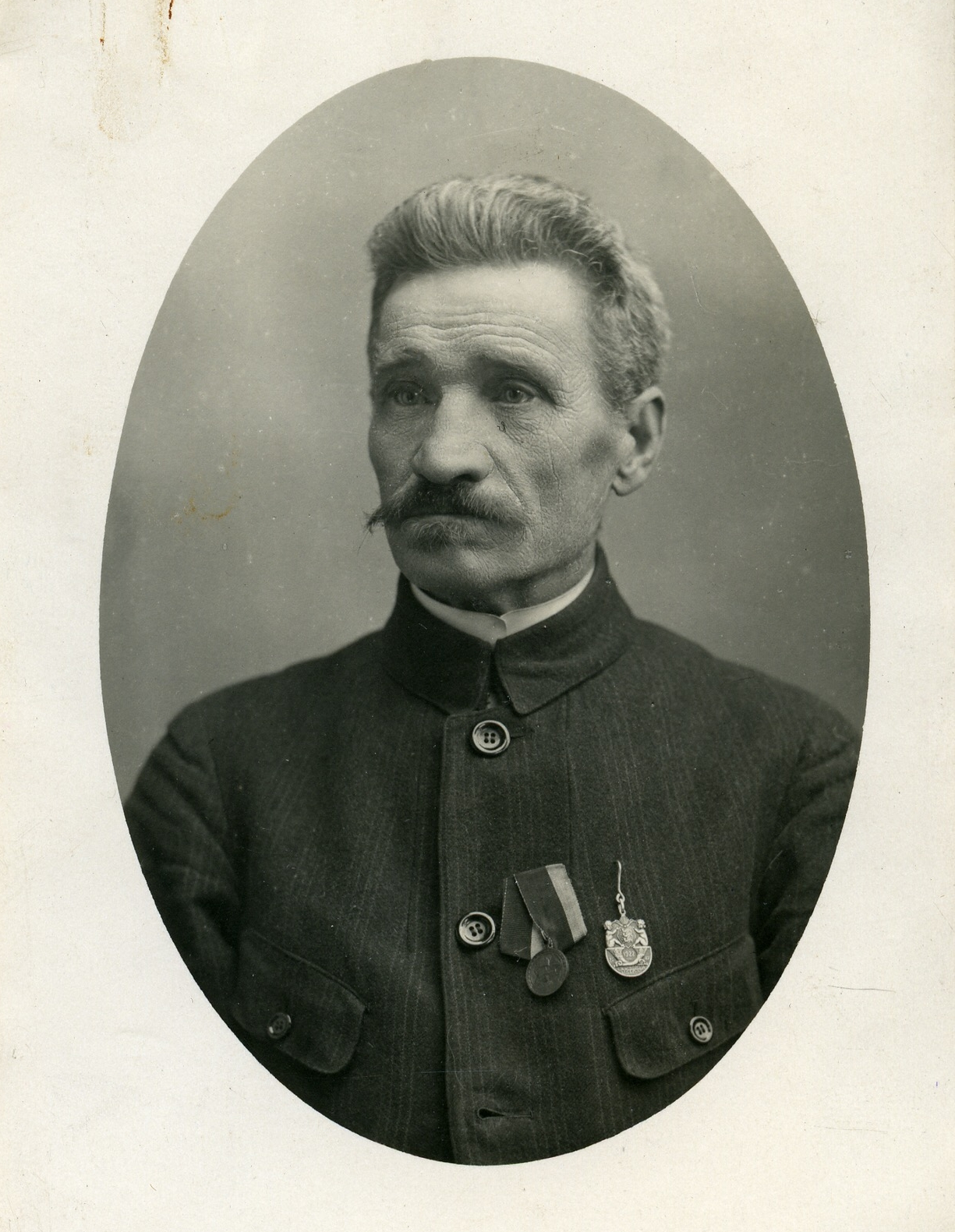
- Jüri Truusmann between 1922 and 1932
- Born: October 13, 1866; Eristvere (now Painküla), Estonia
- Died: August 13, 1932 (aged 65); Eristvere (now Painküla), Estonia
- Occupations: Teacher, farmer, public figure
- Relatives: Jüri Truusmann (brother)

Jaan Truusmann (October 13 [O.S. October 1] 1866 – August 15, 1932) was an Estonian teacher, farmer, and public figure.

== Early life and education ==
Jaan Truusmann was born in the village of Eristvere (today part of Painküla) in Laiuse Parish, Tartu County, as the seventh son of the tenant farmer Jüri Truusmann (1826–1916) and Mai Truusmann (née Rehemaa, 1825–1895) on the Tõnnu farm. He was educated at the Painküla village school (1875–1877) and the Orthodox parish schools in Nina (1879–1882) and Laiuse (1882–1884). In Nina, his older brother Mart (a.k.a. Martin; 1852–1926) was his teacher.

== Career ==
At the beginning of 1886, he started working as an assistant teacher at the Väike-Lähtru Orthodox parish school, but already at the beginning of the next academic year he left there to become a teacher at the Orthodox auxiliary school in Nõva, where he worked as a teacher until the end of 1894.

From 1892, in addition to his teaching profession, he ran a small shop in Nõva, being a merchant of the second guild of Tallinn. At the end of 1894, however, he gave up his teaching profession altogether and focused entirely on his trade as a merchant. In 1895, he worked as a merchant in Uniküla (now part of Avispea) and from 1896 to 1903 in Hirla, where he ran a shop in Lilleoru.

In 1903, Truusmann acquired the Iisaku (Jaagu) farm in Eristvere, next to his birthplace and father's farm, where he began to work more extensively as a farmer, primarily as a beekeeper and trout farmer. He also enjoyed hunting. The trout ponds built on his farm were the first and largest of their kind owned by an Estonian at the time. In some years, 25,000 to 30,000 trout fry were released into the pond. Truusmann traveled to St. Petersburg to sell the trout, which was a large and expensive undertaking for a single fish farmer. After World War I, the Russian market practically disappeared for Estonians, and Truusmann gave up fish farming.

As a beekeeper, Truusmann published the book Täielik mesilastepidamise õpetus (Complete Beekeeping Instruction), which was published in 1903 in Tallinn by the publishing house C. Keyler ja Poeg (second edition in 1908 in Tartu and third edition in 1923 in Tallinn). The book is notable for being one of the first Estonian-language beekeeping textbooks. As a beekeeper, Truusmann participated in agricultural courses organized by Hendrik Laas in Tartu several times as a teacher between 1901 and 1909.

Truusmann died on August 15, 1932 at his home in Eristvere and was buried on August 18 in Siimusti Cemetery.

== Social activities ==
Truusmann also took part in local social life. He was one of the founders and a member of the management of the Simuna Loan and Savings Association, a member of the Simuna Farmers' Association, one of the founders and a member of the council of Jõgeva Cooperative Bank (Estonian: Jõgeva Ühispank), a member of the Jõgeva Economic Association and chairman of the audit committee, and a member of the Jõgeva rural municipal council.

Truusmann represented farmers and ranchers at conferences and meetings on several occasions. For example, in 1905 he participated in the School Organization Conference in Riga as a representative of the peasants of Tartu County and in 1919 at the National Agricultural Congress held at the Estonia Theatre in Tallinn, where he made a speech calling on the leading political parties (the Labor Party, People's Party, and Rural Alliance) to cooperate with each other.

As a socially active individual and a representative of the rural municipality of Jõgeva, Truusmann sought to enter national politics on a few occasions. Thus, in 1912, he was a candidate for the Tartu County electorate to the State Duma. In 1917, he was nominated as a candidate for the rural municipality of Jõgeva in the Provincial Assembly elections. However, these few attempts failed and he did not become a politician.

Among other activities, Truusmann contributed to the newspapers Valgus (1883–1894), Olevik, Teataja, Päevaleht, Vaba Maa, Põllumees, Valgamaalane (1883–1894), Mesilane, and Majapidaja.

While working as a teacher in his youth, Truusmann also took part in collecting antiques and folklore, mainly collecting folklore from Nõva.

== Family ==
Jaan Truusmann's brothers were the tsarist Tallinn censor, ethnographer, and writer Jüri Truusmann (1856–1930), the Orthodox seminary teacher Mart Truusmann (1852–1928), and the farmer Mihkel Truusmann (1850–1936). His brother Joosep died in infancy. He also had three sisters: Mari (married Välbe, 1860–1943), Mai (married Villmann, 1862–1941), and Ann Truusmann (1868–1918).

Jaan Truusmann married Maria Kadanik (1872–1964) in 1892, whom he met through his brother Jüri when Maria worked as a housemaid for him in Tallinn. Jaan and Maria had eight children, two of whom died in infancy.

== Works ==
=== Books ===
- 1903: Täielik mesilastepidamise õpetus (Complete Beekeeping Instruction). Tallinn, C. Keyler ja Poeg (2nd rev. ed., 1908, Tartu, G. Zirk; 3rd rev. ed., 1923, Tallinn, Agronoom)

=== Articles ===
- 1907: "Kewade näitab kiiresti liginema" (Spring Seems to Be Approaching Quickly). Tartumaalt Päewaleht 70 (March 26), p. 2.
- 1911: "Kuidas ma mesilastepidajaks sain" (How I Became a Beekeeper). Talu 3, 1911.
- 1913: "Jõgewalt" (From Jõgeva). Olevik 28 (April 10), p. 220.
- 1915: "Üleskutse ja Palwe Kalakaswatajatele" (A Call and a Prayer to Fish Farmers). Päewaleht 7 (January 10).
- 1920: "Linade monopol" (The Linen Monopoly). Päewaleht 37 (February 14).
