= Jüri Truusmann =

Estonian writer (1856–1930)

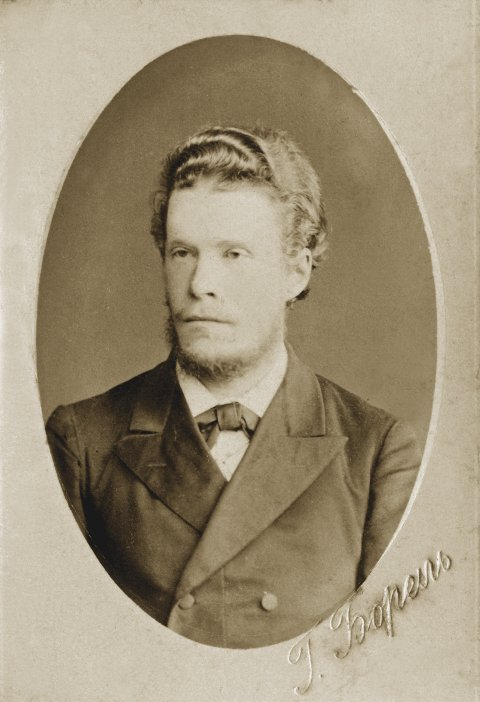
- Jüri Truusmann c. 1885
- Born: December 27, 1856; Eristvere (now Painküla), Estonia
- Died: June 2, 1930 (aged 73); Pskov-Caves Monastery, Pechory, Russia
- Occupations: Censor, writer, ethnographer, and linguist
- Relatives: Jaan Truusmann (brother)

Jüri Truusmann (Russian: Георгий Георгиевич Трусман; December 27 [O.S. December 15] , 1856 – June 2, 1930) was an Estonian censor, writer, ethnographer, and linguist.

== Early life and education ==
Jüri Truusmann was born in the village of Eristvere (today part of Painküla) in Laiuse Parish, Tartu County, as the son of the tenant farmer Jüri Truusmann (1826–1916) and Mai Truusmann (née Rehemaa, 1825–1895) on the Tõnnu farm. He received his primary education at the local Orthodox village school. Apparently, it was the local Orthodox curate Jaan Poska (father of the well-known politician Jaan Poska), who, noticing Truusmann's talent, recommended that the boy be sent to study at the Riga Theological School. Poska himself had studied there, and later his four sons also studied there. From 1869 to 1879, Truusmann studied at the Riga Theological School and the Riga Theological Seminary. From Riga, he moved to Saint Petersburg, where he graduated with a master's degree in theology from the Saint Petersburg Theological Academy in 1883. In his master's thesis (Введение христианства в Лифляндии 'The Introduction of Christianity in Livonia', published in 1884 in St. Petersburg), he discussed the arrival of Christianity in the Baltics. After his studies, he briefly taught Latin at the Alexander Nevsky Theological Seminary in St. Petersburg. In addition to Latin, he also spoke Greek, Hebrew, Russian, German, French, and English.

His studies at the Riga Seminary and the St. Petersburg Theological Academy undoubtedly influenced Truusmann's worldview. The friendships and knowledge he gained there increased his sense of belonging to his Estonian compatriots and his negative attitude toward the dominance of the Baltic Germans.

== Career ==
In 1885, Truusmann was appointed the censor for foreign and domestic literature in Tallinn. His task also included censoring the newspaper Valgus, and later also Teataja and Virmaline. Truusmann belonged to the pro-Russian circle in Tallinn, being one of its leaders, and he had good relations with Governor-General Sergei Shakhovskoy. He also had good relations with the group known as the Petersburg patriots, especially Johann Köler.

As a censor during the height of Russification, Truusmann often had to make unpopular and controversial decisions. This meant balancing his official duties with supporting the national aspirations of his compatriots. Truusmann's work made him many enemies, especially among those whose works he had had to ban as a censor. The Estonian politician, poet, and translator Hans Pöögelmann later described him as "a watchdog of the tsarist government's policy in Estonian literature and social life, a snitch and a hellhound, ... a rapist of literature." Those that did not have such experience with Truusmann knew him as a talented man and an active Estonian nationalist. According to Aleksei Bellegarde, who served as the governor of Estonia, "he was an embarrassingly precise and careful person ... one of the most active Estonian nationalists in the best sense of the word; he loved his people passionately and was burning with the desire to improve their situation, which was very difficult in many respects." At the same time, Truusmann favored the publication of the newspaper Teataja, edited by Konstantin Päts, despite opposition and reprimands from the Bureau of Censorship. Truusmann saw Teataja as a means of raising the national consciousness of Estonians and encouraging them to fight for their independence.

Truusmann served as a censor until 1907. The reason for his resignation from the position of censor is unknown, with claims of both voluntary resignation and dismissal.

== Ethnographic and linguistic activities ==
Truusmann studied ethnography and Seto culture, Finno-Ugric languages, and place names, and he published several literary works and articles. In Russian-speaking circles, Truusmann's linguistic works on the study of place names in the Pskov Governorate, Vitebsk Governorate, and other governorates have attracted the most attention, and he is primarily known as a researcher of Estonian history, philology, and ethnography.

Truusmann's contribution as a researcher of Seto culture and as a champion of their cultural self-determination and independence is quite significant. According to Truusmann, the Setos are indigenous, a branch of ancient Baltic Finnic peoples that once inhabited the entire area beyond Lake Peipus and most of the Pskov Governorate, and he argued against the view that the Setos had ever migrated from the Estonian interior to their current location.

The core of Truusmann's comparative linguistic work was the belief in the relationship of Finno-Ugric languages to Indo-European languages, especially Latin and Greek. Truusmann also had a deep interest in Estonian folklore. He was the first to translate the Estonian national epic Kalevipoeg into Russian (prose translation 1886–1889).

== Membership in societies ==
Truusmann became a member of the Society of Estonian Literati in 1881. Already at that time, the work of the society was characterized by fierce ideological conflicts between its members, which worsened over time. In 1887, Truusmann was elected vice-president of the society, but he did not particularly participate in the society's activities. By 1893, when the president of the society was Truusmann's good friend Johann Köler, the conflicts within the society had reached their peak, and a petition was submitted to the governor with Truusmann's participation to close the society.

In the early years of this activity, Truusmann also belonged to the Riga Theological Seminary alumni society in St. Petersburg until he was expelled from it by the society's court of honor in 1887 for a pro-Russian article in a Russian religious magazine.

He was also an honorary member of the Tallinn Estonian Farmers' Society and a member of the Imperial Russian Geographical Society.

== Later activities ==
Truusmann spent the last years of his life withdrawn from public life, initially living with relatives in Laiuse parish in Tartu County, and later at Pskov-Caves Monastery, where he was the monastery's librarian, continuing his writing and research work. To the dismay of many, Jüri Truusmann was one of three men to receive a pension from the Estonian state. Despite this, he lived a rather modest, almost monastic life. Truusmann died at the Pskov-Caves Monastery and is buried in the cemetery of Forty Martyrs of Sebaste Church in Pechory.

== Family ==
Jüri Truusmann's father Jüri Truusmann Sr. (1826–1916) was a tenant farmer, formerly also a municipal judge and councilor, and was a convert to Orthodoxy. His mother Mai (née Rehemaa, 1825–1895) was a Lutheran. He had three brothers and three sisters. His brother Mart (Martin) Truusmann (1852–1926) was an Orthodox curate schoolteacher. His brother Jaan Truusmann (1866–1932) was an Orthodox school teacher, merchant, farmer, beekeeper and trout breeder, and public figure. The third brother, Mihkel Truusmann (1850–1936), was a farmer and beekeeper.

Jüri Truusmann married Aleksandra Troitskaya (1860–?), the daughter of the Orthodox priest Pavel Troitski (1820–1886). His son Paul Truusmann (1888–1936) was a school teacher and lecturer, and for a short time also the director of the high school in Pechory (1920–1923).

The Orthodox high priest Juhan Rehemaa (1859–1924) was his cousin. On his mother's side, the Orthodox priest and bishop Jüri Välbe was also a relative.

== Awards and recognitions ==
- St. Stanislaus Medal of Honor, 3rd Class (1890)
- State Councilor of Russia
- Silver Medal of the Imperial Russian Geographical Society for the 1885 research expedition to the Pskov Setos
- Honorary member of the Tallinn Estonian Farmers' Society

== Works ==
=== Books ===
- Введение христианства в Лифляндии (The Introduction of Christianity in Livonia; St. Petersburg, 1884)
- Новейшие религиозные движения в Эстляндии (The Newest Religious Movements in Estonia, as Юлий Остерблом, Yuliy Osterblom; St. Petersburg, 1885)
- Финские элементы в Гдовском уезде Санкт-Петербургской губернии (Finnish Elements in the Gdovsky District of the St. Petersburg Province; Izvestiya Russkogo Geograficheskogo Obshchestva, vol. 21, 1885)
- Калевич (Kalewi poeg). Древняя эстонская сага в 20 песнях. (Kalevipoeg: An Ancient Estonian Saga in 20 Songs; Tallinn, 1886 and 1889)
- Начало и распространение в древности православия между финскими племенами: К 900-летию крещения Руси (The Origins and Spread of Orthodoxy among the Finnish Tribes in Antiquity: On the 900th Anniversary of the Baptism of Rus′; Tallinn 1888)
- Чудские письмена (Chud Letters; Tallinn, 1896)
- Этимология местных названий Псковского уезда (Etymology of Local Names in the Pskov District; Tallinn, 1897)
- Этимология местных названий Витебской губернии (Etymology of Local Names in the Vitebsk Governorate; Tallinn, 1897)
- Чудско-литовские элементы в Новгородских пятинах. Часть I. Пятины Водьская, Деревская и Шелонская (Chud-Lithuanian Elements in the Novgorod Pyatinas. Part 1. The Vodskaya, Derevskaya, and Shelonskaya Pyatinas; Tallinn, 1898)
- Древнѣйшая ливонская хроника и ея авторъ (The Earliest Livonian Chronicle and Its Author; St. Petersburg, 1907)
- Летто-Славянск. элементы въ Этрускихъ надписяхъ (Letto-Slavic Elements in Etruscan Inscriptions; Tallinn, 1911)

=== Articles ===
- "О месте Ледового побоища" (The Site of the Battle on the Ice). Журнал министерства народного просвещения, 1884, 231(1): 44–46
- "Ложи сына Калева" (The Lodges of Kalev's Son). Эстляндские губернские ведомости Nov. 19, 1887, 44: 20–21
- "Vana Eestlaste ja Liivlaste nimed" (Names of Ancient Estonians and Livonians). Oma Maa Feb. 15, 1889, 2: 107–108
- "Полуверцы Псково-Печорского края" (The Setos of the Pskov-Pechory Region). Живая старина, 1890, 1: 31–62 (Ali Kikkas's abridged translation of the article: "Petserimaa Setud" (The Setos of Petseri County). Mäetagused 2002, 19: 176–190)
- "Eesti muinasjut Ruurikest, Sineussist ja Truworist" (Estonian Folk Tales about Rurik, Sineus, and Truvor). Valgus Sept. 5, 1890, 37: 2–3
- "О происхождении Корси (Курон)" (The Origin of the Name Curonian). Живая старина, 1893, 1(9): 64–91
- "Двина-река" (The Daugava River). Живая старина, 1893, 1(9): 135
- "О происхождении названия г. Пскова" (The Origin of the Name of the City of Pskov). Живая старина, 1894, 1(13): 120–122
- "О происхождении названия г. Изборска и древнего населения его окрестностей" (The Origin of the Name of the City of Izborsk and the Ancient Population of Its Environs). Живая старина, 1894, 3–4(15–16): 549–554
- "Исакскіе полувѣрцы вь Зстляндской губерніи" (The Orthodox Estonians of Iisaku Parish in the Governorate of Estonia). In: Временник Эстляндской губернии, 2, Tallinn, 1895
- "О происхождении псково-печорских полуверцев" (The Origin of the Pskov-Pechora Setos). Живая старина, 1897, 1(25): 37–47
- "Tallinna nimed" (Names of Tallinn). Vaba Maa Feb. 9, 1923, 33: 4
- "Wene=Setu wahekord ajalooandmetel" (The Russian–Seto Relationship Based on Historical Data). Päevaleht Jun. 27, 1924, 169: 5
- "Mälestused Tõnis Waresest" (Recollections of Tõnis Wares). Õigus 1925, 7: 163–166
- "Kui wana wõib olla Eesti keel?" (How Old Can the Estonian Language Be?). Postimees Oct. 26, 1925, 290: 2
