= Iurie =

Iurie is a Romanian and Moldovan given name for males. Notable people with the name include:

- Iurie Arcan (born 1964), Moldovan football manager
- Iurie Bolboceanu (born 1959), Moldovan politician
- Iurie Ciocan (born 1971), politician and professor from the Republic of Moldova
- Iurie Colesnic (born 1955), Moldovan politician
- Iurie Darie (1929–2012), Romanian actor
- Iurie Leancă (born 1963), Moldovan politician
- Iurie Miterev (1975–2012), Moldovan footballer
- Iurie Platon (born 1963), Moldovan painter and sculptor
- Iurie Priganiuc (born 1978), Moldovan professional footballer
- Iurie Reniţă (born 1958), Moldovan diplomat
- Iurie Roşca (born 1961), Moldovan politician, president of the Christian-Democratic People's Party (CDPP) since 1994
- Iurie Țap (born 1955), Moldovan politician
- Iurie Țurcanu (born 1973), Moldovan politician
