= Yuri (Slavic name) =

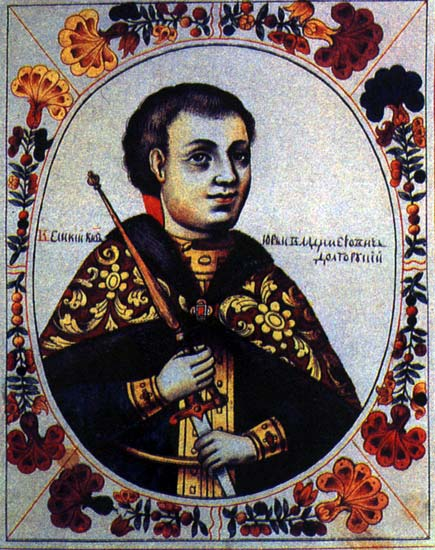
- Yuri Dolgoruky
- Pronunciation: Belarusian: [ˈju.rɨ], Russian: [ˈjʉrʲɪj], Ukrainian: [ˈjur⁽ʲ⁾ij]
- Gender: masculine
- Language: Slavic

Origin
- Origin: Georgios

Other names
- Alternative spelling: Yury, Youri, Yuriy, Yurij, Iurii, Iouri, Juri, Jurij
- Variant forms: Georgy, Yegor

Jury, Jurij, Iurii, Iouri, Yury, Yuri, Youri, Yurii, Yuriy or Yurij is the Slavic (Belarusian: Юры, romanized: Jury, or Bulgarian: Юрий, romanized: Jurij, or Ukrainian: Юрій, romanized: Yurii, or Russian: Юрий, romanized: Yuriy, or Rusyn: Юрко, romanized: Yurko) form of the masculine given name George; it is derived directly from the Greek form Georgios and related to Polish Jerzy, Czech Jiří, and Slovak and Croatian Juraj, akin to Spanish and Portuguese Jorge, and German Jürgen, and assimilated in modern forms such as German and Italian Juri, Portuguese Iúri, Estonian Jüri, and Dutch Joeri.

The Slavic form of the name originates with Yuri Dolgoruky (c. 1099–1157), in early accounts recorded as Gyurgi, Dyurgi.

== Ancient and medieval world ==
(Listed chronologically)

- Yuri Dolgorukiy or Yuri I Vladimirovich (c. 1099–1157).
- Yuri II of Vladimir (1189–1238), Grand Prince of Vladimir
- Yuriy Drohobych (1450–1494), Ruthenian philosopher, astrologist, writer, and doctor
- Yury Ivanovich (1480–1536), a son of Ivan the Great

== Modern world ==
(Listed alphabetically)

- Yuri Andropov (1914–1984), Chairman of the KGB and leader of the Soviet Union
- Yuri Antonov (born 1945), Russian composer, singer, and musician
- Yuri Berchiche (born 1990), Spanish footballer
- Yuri Bezmenov (1939–1993), Soviet journalist and eventual anti-communist who defected to Canada
- Yuri Collins (born 2001), American basketball player
- Yuri Gagarin (1934–1968), Soviet cosmonaut and the first human in space
- Yury Gelman (born 1955), Ukrainian-born American Olympic fencing coach
- Yuri Gorlov (born 1977), Belarusian politician
- Yury Grigorovich (1927–2025), Soviet and Russian ballet dancer, ballet master, and choreographer
- Yuri Kasparyan (born 1963), Soviet and Russian musician and guitarist
- Yurii Kerpatenko (1976–2022), Ukrainian conductor
- Yuri Irsenovich Kim, birth name of Kim Jong-il (1941 or 1942–2011), Supreme Leader of North Korea
- Yuri Knorozov (1922-1999), Soviet/Russian linguist, epigraphist, and ethnologist
- Yuri Korolev (ice hockey) (born 1934), Soviet/Russian ice hockey administrator
- Yuri Korolyov, (1962–2023) Russian gymnast
- Yuriy Kozhanov (born 1990), Kazakh basketball player
- Yuri Lowenthal (born 1971), American actor, producer and screenwriter best known for his voice-over work
- Yuri Luchko, German professor of mathematics
- Yury Luzhkov (1936–2019), Russian politician
- Yuri Lyapkin (born 1945), Russian ice hockey player
- Yuriy Mushketyk (1929–2019), Ukrainian writer and journalist
- Yuri Nikitin (author) (1939–2025), Russian sci-fi author
- Yuri Nikitin (gymnast) (born 1978), Ukrainian trampolinist
- Yuri Nikulin (1921–1997), Soviet/Russian actor and clown
- Yuri Oganessian (born 1933), Russian nuclear physicist for whom Element 118 was named
- Yury Prilukov (born 1984), Russian swimmer
- Yuriy Prylypko (1960-2022) Ukrainian politician and mayor of Hostomel
- Yury Rudov (1931–2013), Soviet fencer
- Yuriy Rybchynskyi (born 1945), Ukrainian poet and playwright
- Yuri Shatunov (1973–2022), Russian singer
- Yuri Shchekochikhin (1950–2003), Russian investigative journalist, writer and liberal politician
- Yuri Schwebler (1942–1990), Yugoslavia-born American conceptual artist and sculptor
- Yuri Shevchuk (born 1957), Soviet/Russian rock musician, singer and songwriter
- Yuri Shymko (born 1940), Canadian politician
- Yuriy Tarnawsky (1934–2025), Ukrainian-American poet, writer and linguist
- Yuriy Trubetskoy (c. 1643–1679), Ruthenian prince
- Yuri Tsaler (born 1973), Russian musician in the band Mumiy Troll
- Yury Usachov (born 1957), Russian retired cosmonaut
- Yuri Vasiliev, Russian basketball player
- Yuri Vizbor (1934–1984), Soviet bard, poet and actor
- Yuri Vladimirov (1942–2025), Russian Bolshoi Ballet dancer
- Yuri Zhirkov (born 1983), Russian footballer

== See also ==
- Igor (given name)
