= Jüri Välbe =

Estonian footballer

Personal information
- Full name: Jüri Välbe
- Date of birth: 26 February 1911
- Place of birth: Tõrva, Estonia
- Date of death: 23 March 1964 (aged 53)
- Place of death: Estonia
- Position: Forward

Senior career*
| Years | Team | Apps | (Gls) |
- Tervis Pärnu

International career
| 1934 | Estonia | 1 | (0) |
- * Club domestic league appearances and goals

Jüri Välbe (26 February 1911 – 23 March 1964) was an Estonian footballer who played as a forward and made one appearance for the Estonia national team.

== Career ==
Välbe earned his first and only cap for Estonia on 10 August 1934 in the Turaani Turniir against Hungary, which finished as a 2–2 draw in Tallinn.

== Personal life ==
Välbe died on 23 March 1964 at the age of 53.

== Career statistics ==
=== International ===
Estonia
| Year | Apps | Goals |
|---|---|---|
| 1934 | 1 | 0 |
| Total | 1 | 0 |
