= Dome of al-Khidr =

Islamic building in Al-Aqsa, Jerusalem

- Qubbat al-Khidr قبة الخضر
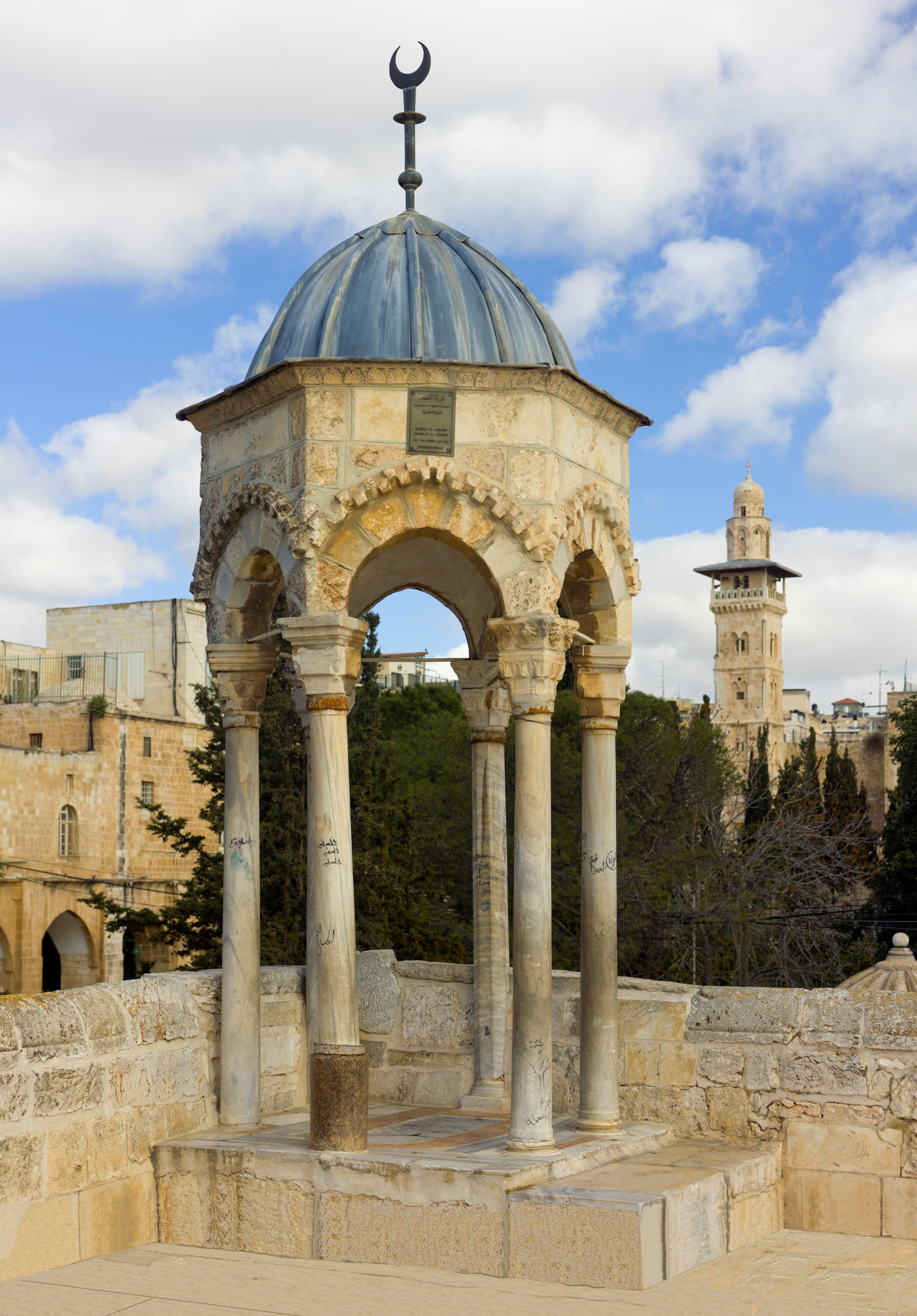

- Location within the Old City of Jerusalem

Religion
- Affiliation: Islam

Location
- Location: Jerusalem
- Interactive map of Dome of al-Khidr
- Coordinates: 31°46′42″N 35°14′05″E

Architecture
- Established: 16th century

The Dome of al-Khidr (Arabic: قبة الخضر, romanized: Qubbat al-Khidr) or the Dome of St. George is a small domed-building located in the southwest corner of the Temple Mount (Haram ash-Sharif), in the Old City of Jerusalem. Is it dedicated to Khidr, who is associated with Saint George in local tradition.

== History and description ==
According to tradition, the dome of al-Khidr was built in the 16th century, in commemoration of Khidr, a saint mentioned in verse 65-82, chapter 18 of the Koran and would rise on the spot where Khidr stopped to pray to Allah.

The dome has a hexagonal structure and is supported by six gray marble columns. Inside the dome, it has a red stone niche.

== See also ==
- St. George's Monastery, Al-Khader
- Church of Saint George and Mosque of Al-Khadr
