= Feast of Saint George (Palestine) =

Palestinian interfaith holiday

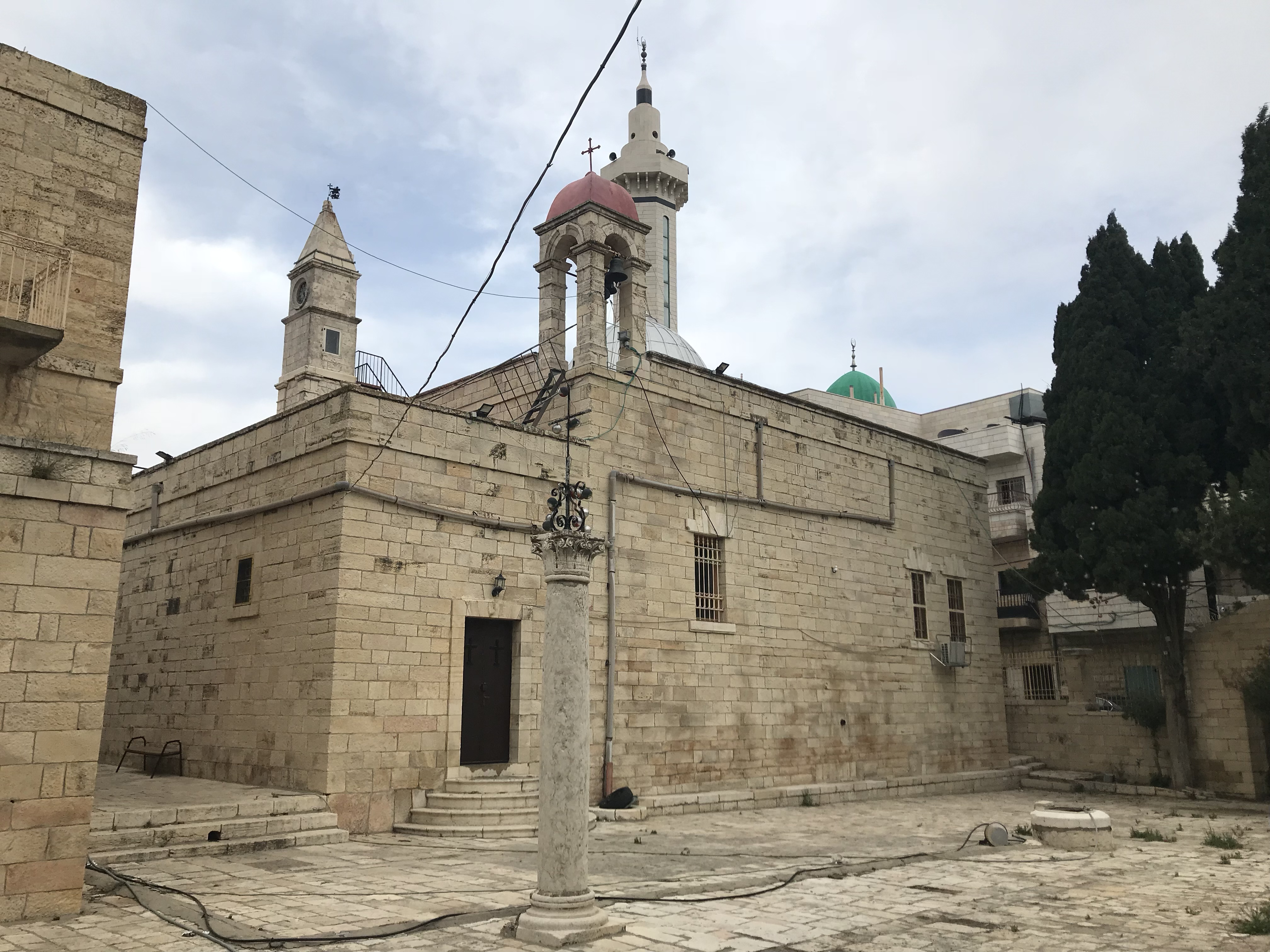
- Al Khader monastery
- Observed by: Palestinian Christians and Muslims in Bethlehem-area
- Type: Popular feast day
- Significance: Requests from Saint George (al-Khader) for protection
- Observances: Ritual animal sacrifice, children's baptism, offering of meat to others
- Date: 5 May-6 May
- Related to: Saint George's Day

The Feast of Saint George (also called al-Khader) is a Palestinian holiday commemorating Saint George, known as Mar Jeries or Jirjis and al-Khader, in Palestinian Arabic. The feast occurs annually on 5 May, and although it is originally a local Christian holiday, both Palestinian Christians and Muslims participate. The feast is held in the Palestinian town of al-Khader, just south of Bethlehem.

== Origins ==
Palestinian folklore suggests that the feast originated during the Byzantine rule of Palestine. According to the folktale,

"the feast came and the young men stood together making their vows. One said, 'I will give a goat,' another 'I will give a sheep.' Then Jirjis (Jeries), the son of a widow, desired to offer something. They had but one cow. Then he said, 'I will sacrifice a cow,' and he went and killed the cow."

At evening time his mother called to him and said, 'Where is the cow?' He said, 'I gave it to El Khader. (St. George)' His mother said, 'You have cut our lives. Let me not see your face again.' That night, the young man had a vision. A white haired man appeared to him and said, 'Fear not, I am El Khader: thou shalt go to Constantinople and to the king’s palace. Only each day thou shalt call a blessing upon me.' ...

== Religious traditions ==
=== Christian ===
Previously, the feast attracted people, Muslim and Christian, from throughout Palestine to visit the Monastery of Saint George and trade loaves of bread, make sacrifices they vow to fulfill and gather for picnics under the olive trees surrounding the monastery.

The same tradition continues today, with many Christian pilgrims coming to baptize their children, due to the abundance of stories about the healing properties of Saint George. Although the priest accepts meat as a gift, the Christian tradition of the monastery itself does not sacrifice the animals. On the morning of 6 May, Palestinian Christians from Beit Jala, Bethlehem, Beit Sahour and other parts of Palestine would march in a procession to the monastery.

=== Islamic ===
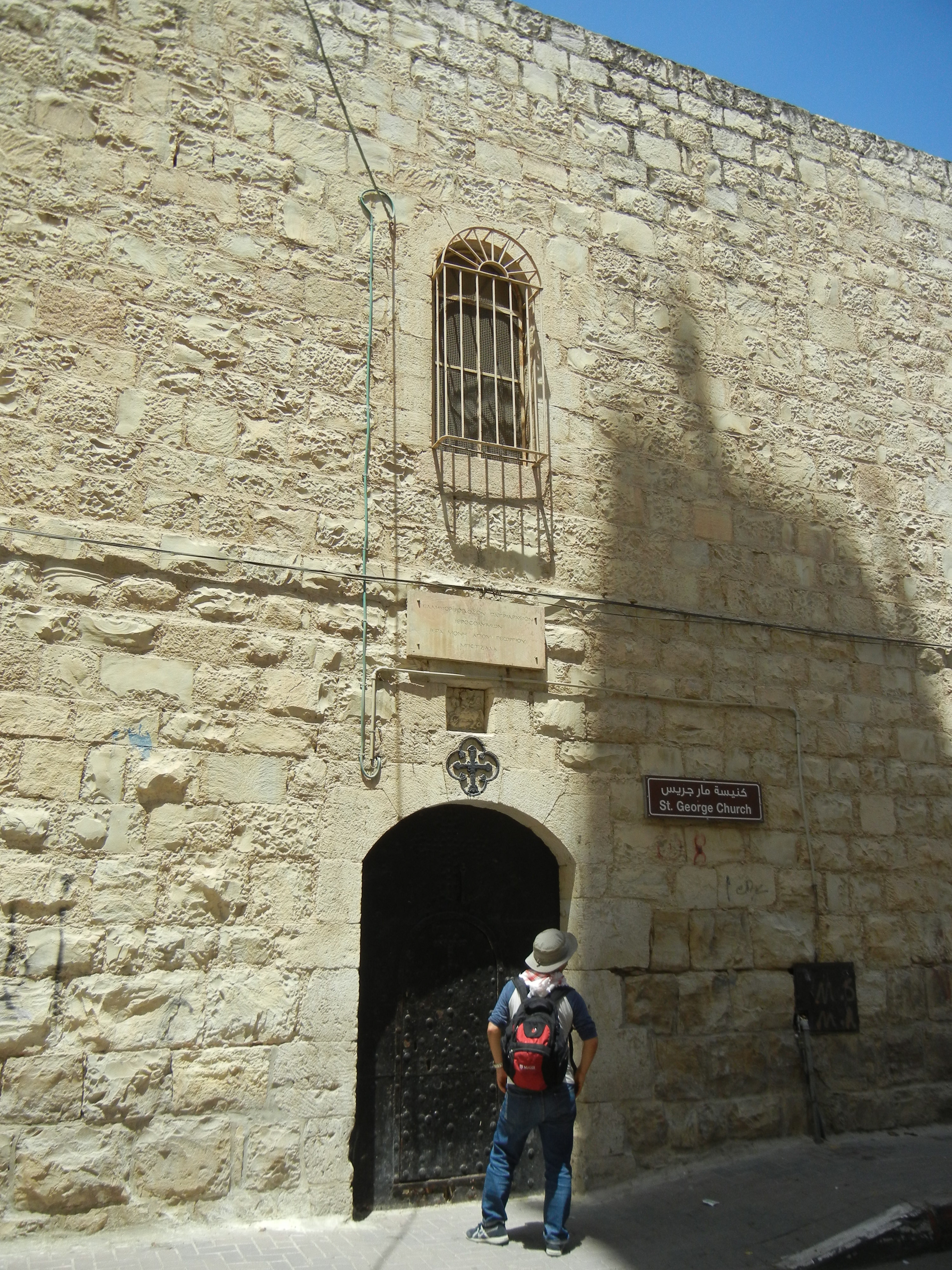
St.George church

Traditionally, Muslims guard the entrance of the church and welcome pilgrims. Like the Christians, the Muslims too sacrifice sheep during the feast and offerings are stored in a sheep pen in the garden of the monastery. In Islam, two sacrifices are offered: The first is the dhabihah, which requires that one-third of the immolated lamb be set aside for consumption by its owner, while the remaining two-thirds are for Allah and given as charity. The second offering is that of a live animal, bequeathed as a gift to Saint George.

Muslim signs dot the courtyard of the monastery and traces of the sacrifices are evident in the form of the lamb hides left on the balustrades to dry.

== See also ==
- Thursday of the Dead
- Nabi Musa
