= St. George's Monastery, Al-Khader =

Eastern Orthodox Christian monastery and church in al-Khader, West Bank, Palestine

Church of Saint George in Al-Khader
- دير وكنيسة القديس جاورجيوس
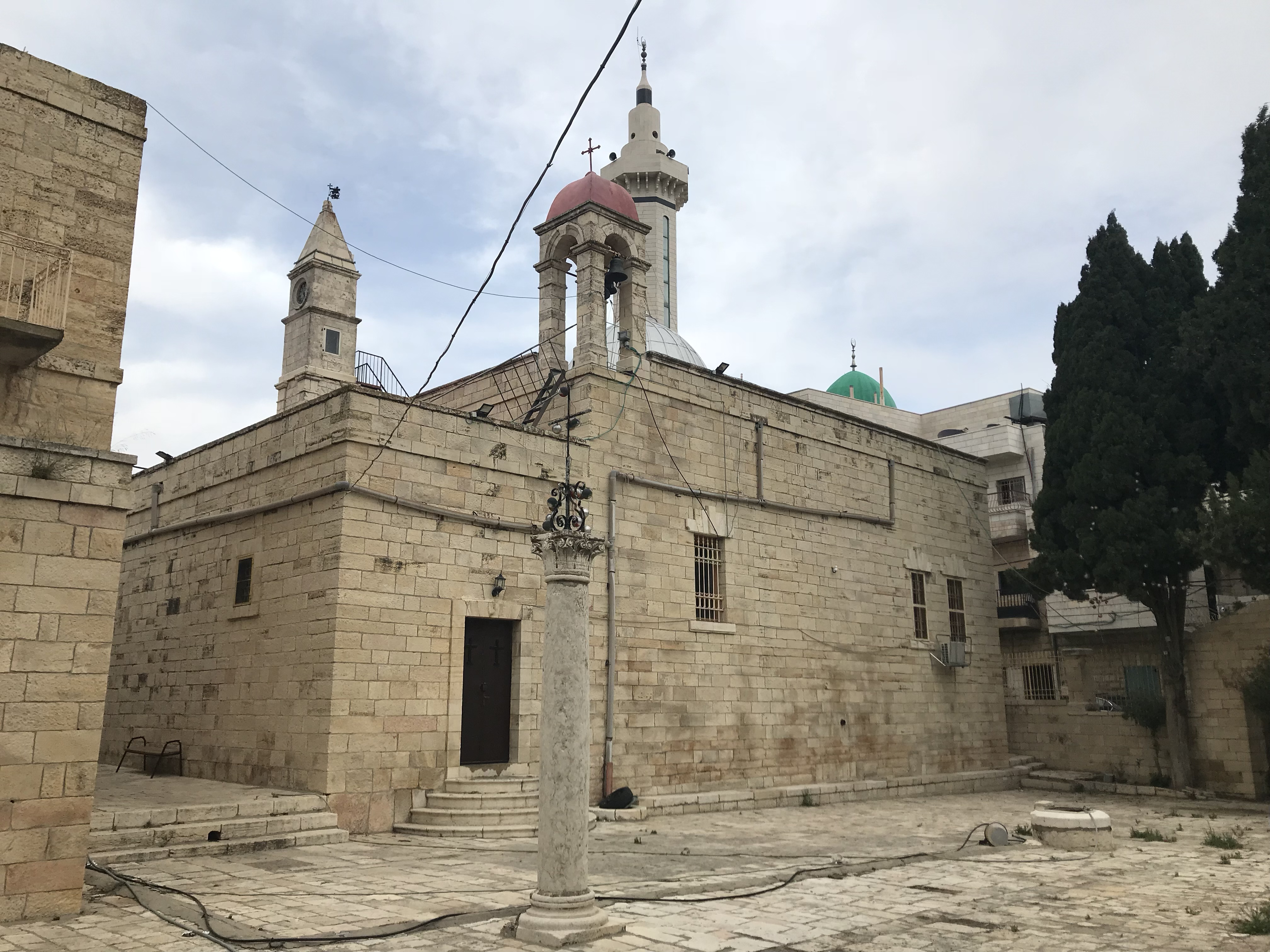

Religion
- Affiliation: Eastern Christian monasticism

Location
- Location: al-Khader, West Bank
- Country: Palestine
- Interactive map of Church of Saint George in Al-Khader
- Palestine grid: 1654/1235
- Coordinates: 31°42′13″N 35°09′41″E

The Monastery and Church of Saint George in Al-Khader (Arabic: دير وكنيسة القديس جاورجيوس) is an Eastern Orthodox Christian religious site in the Palestinian town of al-Khader, near Beit Jala and Bethlehem, in West Bank, Palestine. The town of Al-Khader is named after Saint George, who in Arab culture is known as "al-Khadr"; the church is considered to be the most important sanctuary to al-Khadr in Palestine.

According to local tradition, Saint George was imprisoned in the town of al-Khader, where the current church stands. The chains holding him were relics that were said to hold healing power.

== History ==
=== Crusader/Ayyubid and Mamluk periods ===
In the thirteenth century, an anonymous Greek text noted: ‘After Bait Jala, there is to be seen the church of the Great George; and in it is kept the chain that was laid on his back’.

Around 1421/1422 the Church of St. George was mentioned by Western traveler John Poloner as situated on a hill near Bethlehem. In 1480 Felix Fabri noted: "At the side of this church there was once a great and fair monastery of Greek monks, but now it has been laid in ruins, and their remains only a little hovel, leaning against the church, wherein two Greek monks dwell."

=== Ottoman period ===
Around 1740, Richard Pococke still noted it as a Greek convent, but in 1838, when Edward Robinson passed, the former church had become a mosque.

In 1863, Victor Guérin noted "As for the convent or Deir el-Khadher, it is not very considerable and does not seem so old. It is administered by a single religious Greek, assisted by two brothers and a few servants. A small number of narrow cells are reserved for foreigners. A solid, iron-clad door gives access to the interior of the cloister."

During the late 19th century, part of the convent were used for the mentally ill.

The modern church was built in 1912 but the remains of the chapel date back to the 16th century. The edifice has an Eastern Orthodox interior, and the dome contains a portrait of Christ Pantocrator.

=== Modern era ===
The Feast of Saint George is an annual popular celebratory ritual in Palestine and draws both Christians and Muslims from the Bethlehem area and beyond to the church and monastery on May 5 and 6 to mark it. People come to pay homage, give thanks or receive blessings and protection. A special holy bread is made for this feast, some plain, other versions stamped with a cross or the image of Saint George slaying the dragon.

Those seeking special blessings, particularly protection or healing, line up to kiss and pass the chains with which Saint George was bound overtheir heads (three times) and then step over them. Others might use the oil under the main icon of Saint George in the church, dipping their fingers into it and making the sign of cross. Reverence for Saint George or al Khader ("the green one") transcends religious sect in Palestine, so that Muslims, and even Western Christians, all partake in this commemoration at the Orthodox Christian site.

== Gallery ==
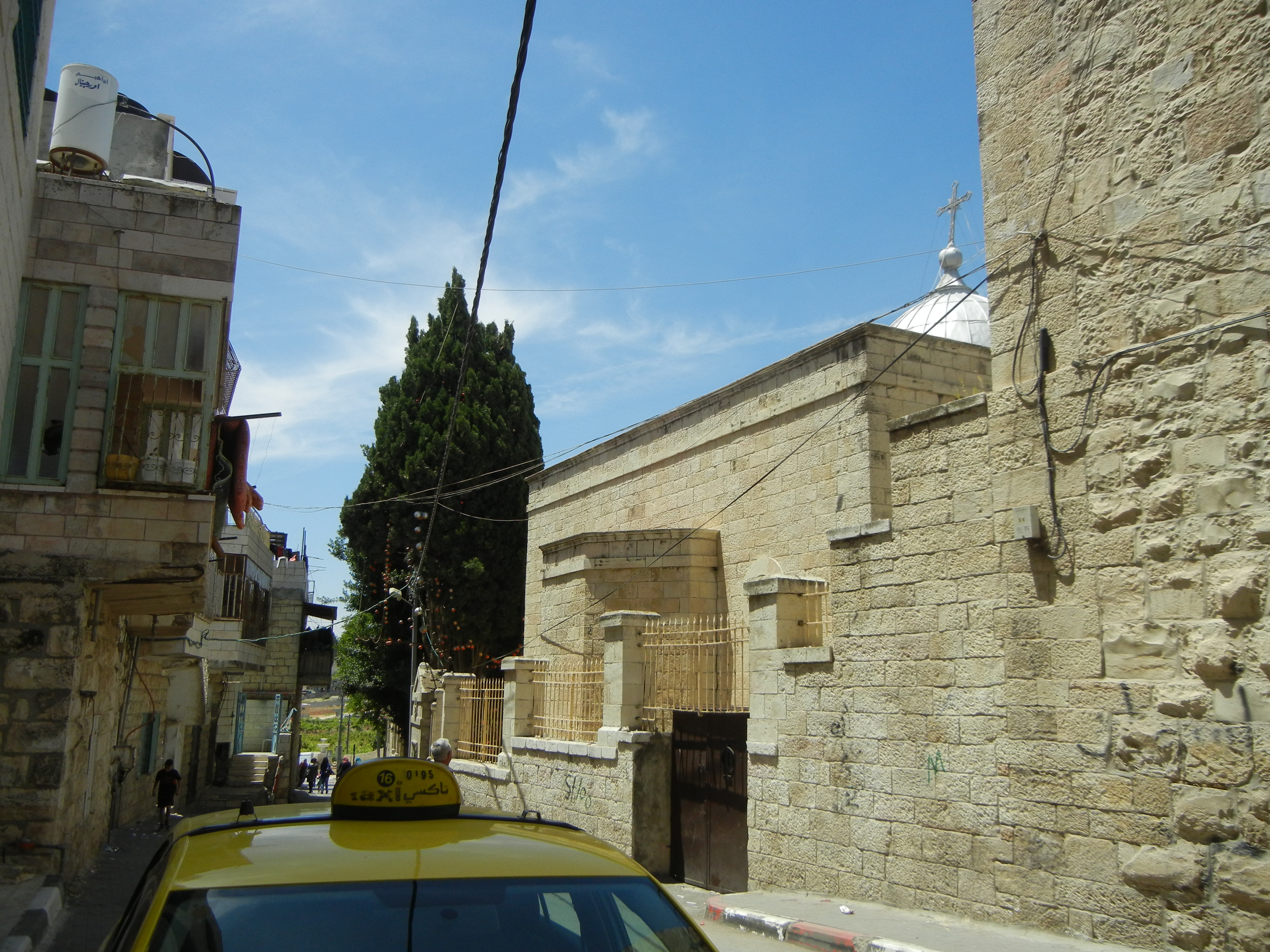

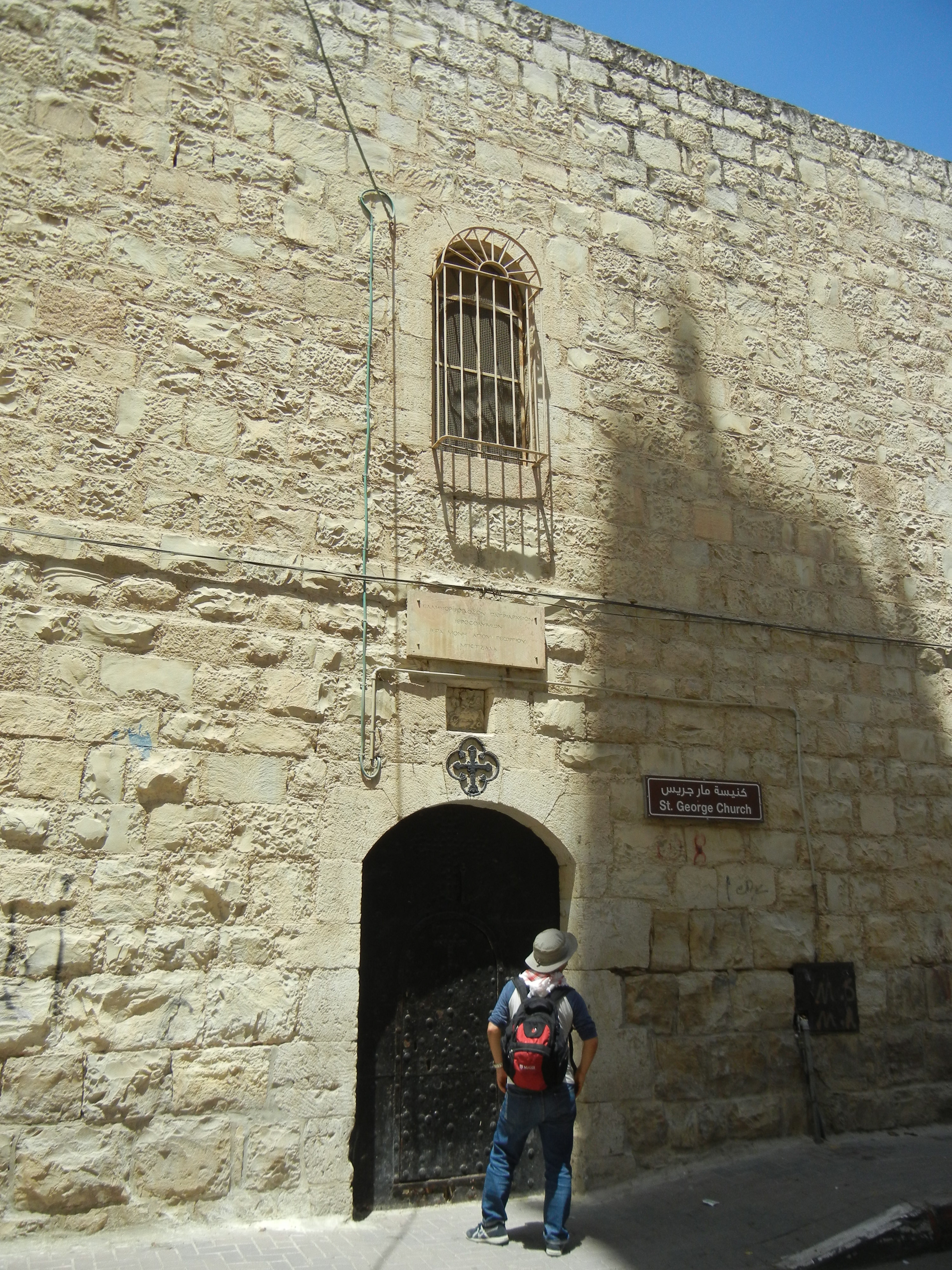

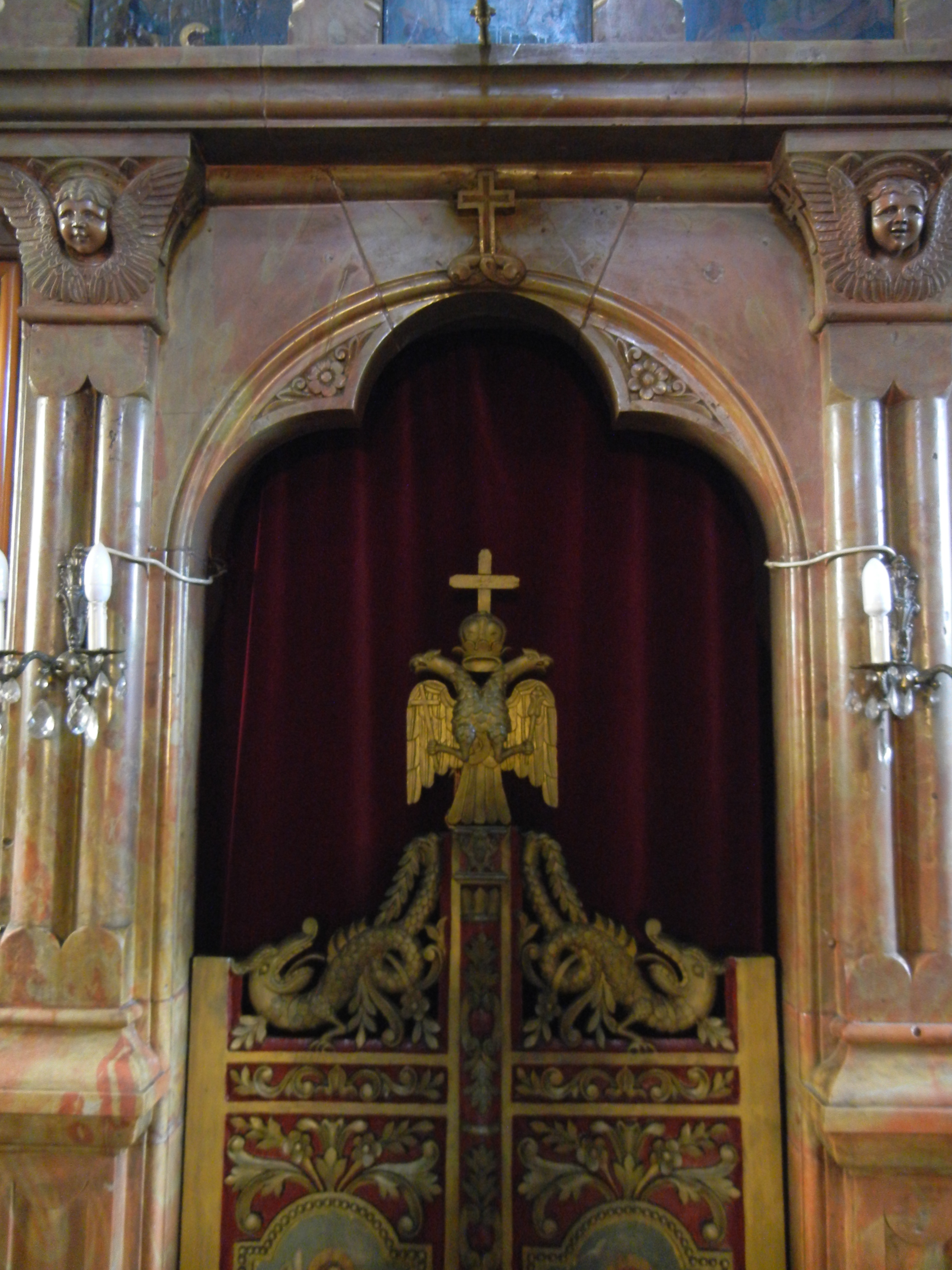

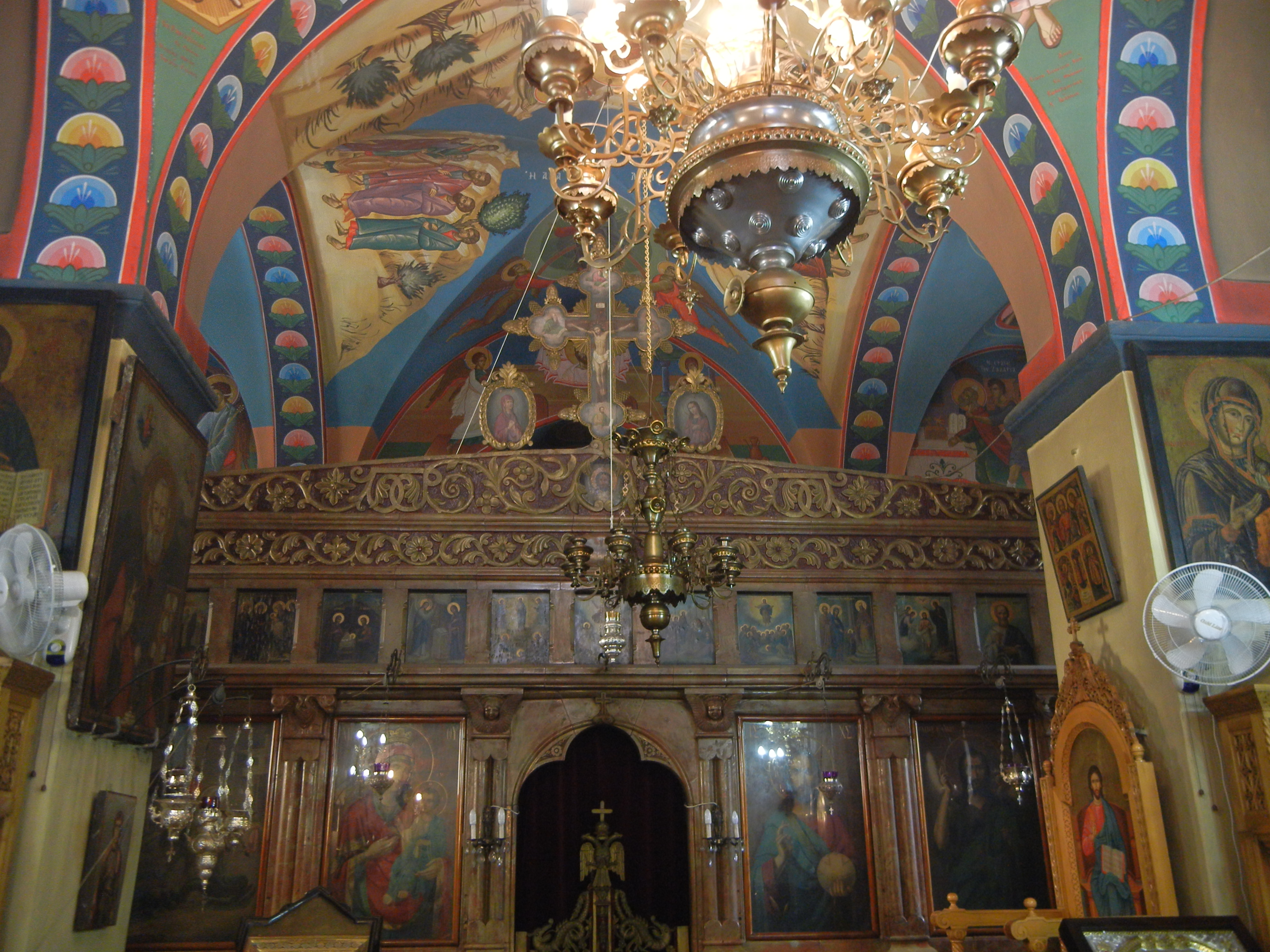

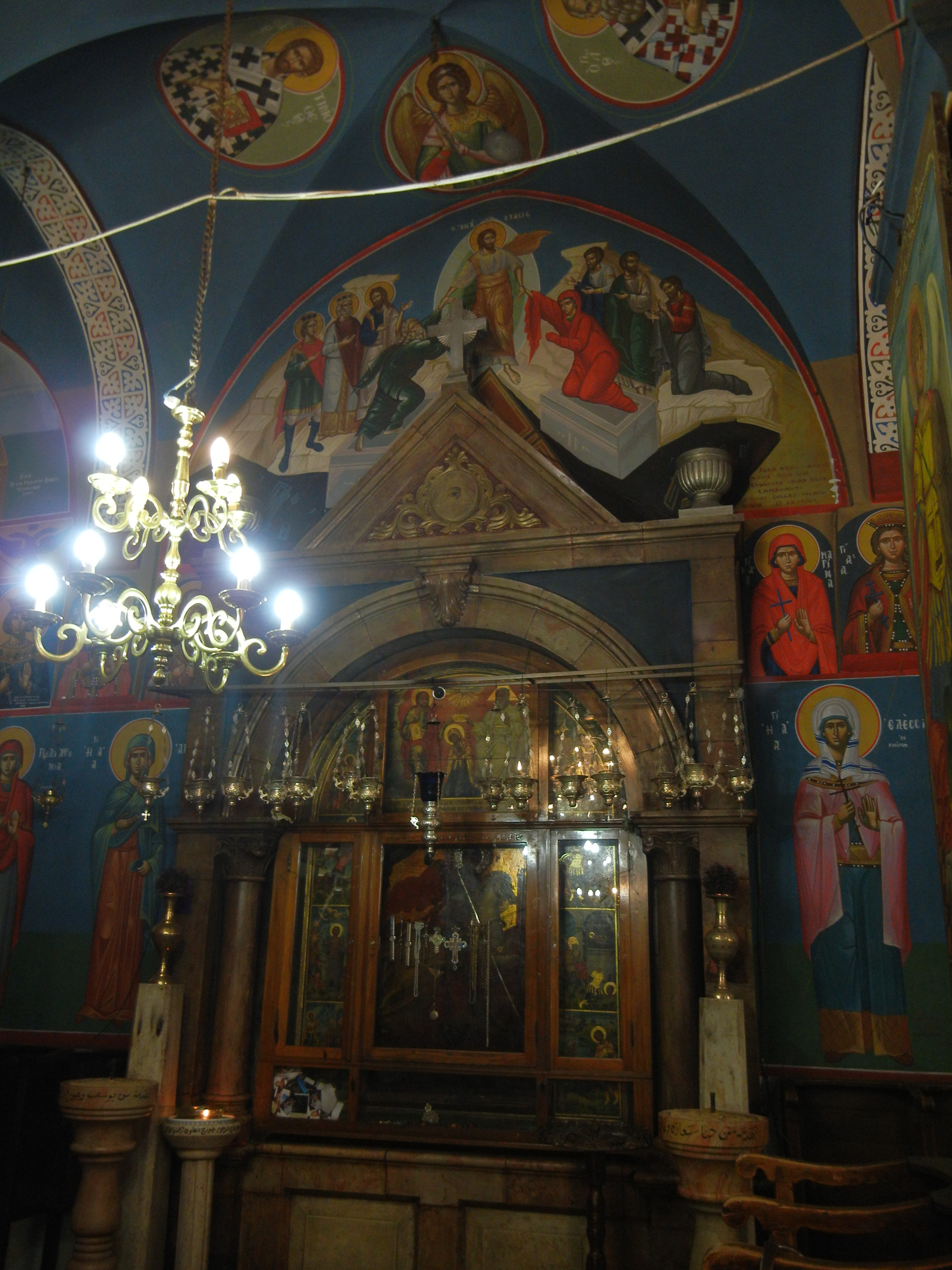

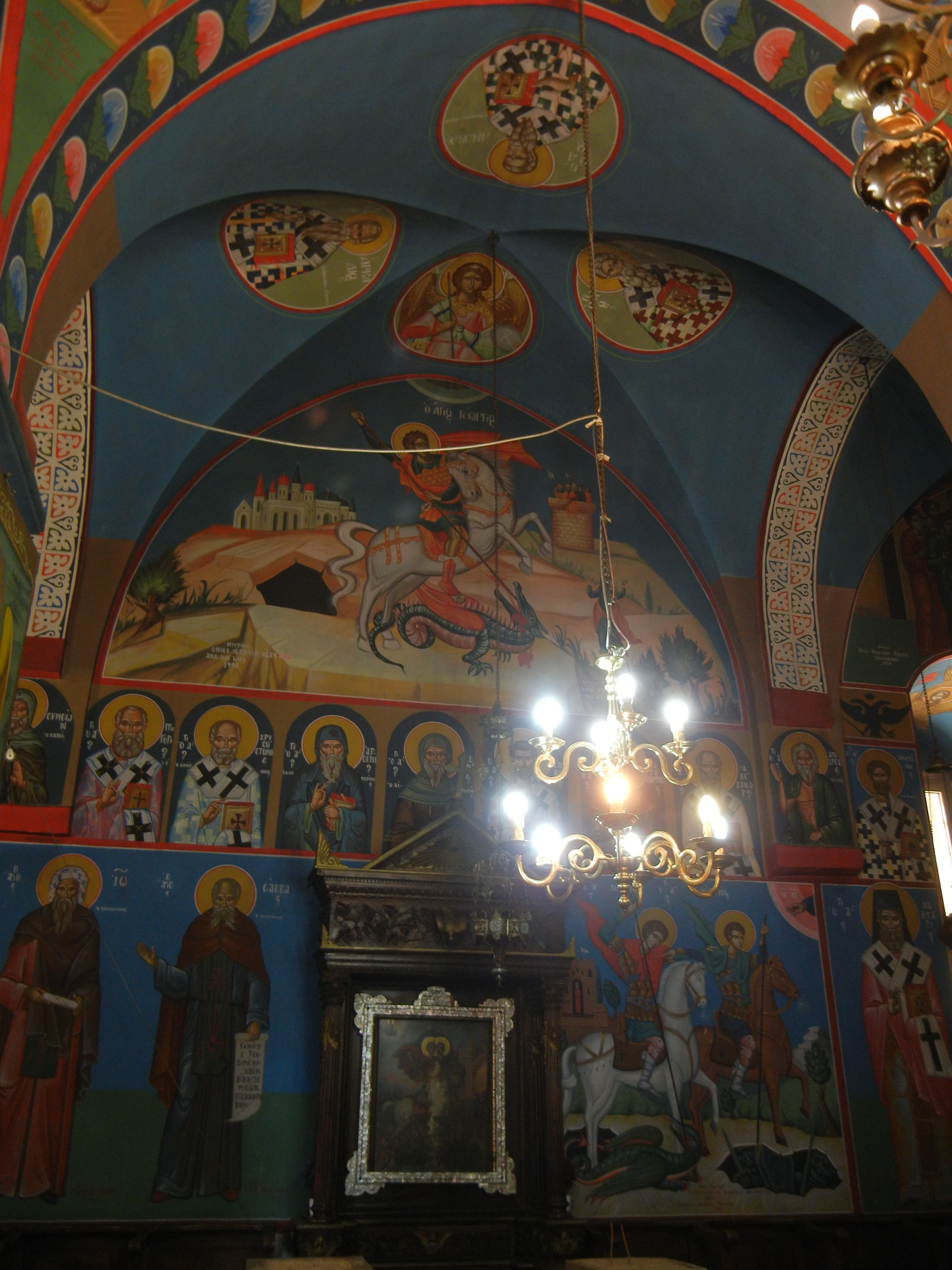

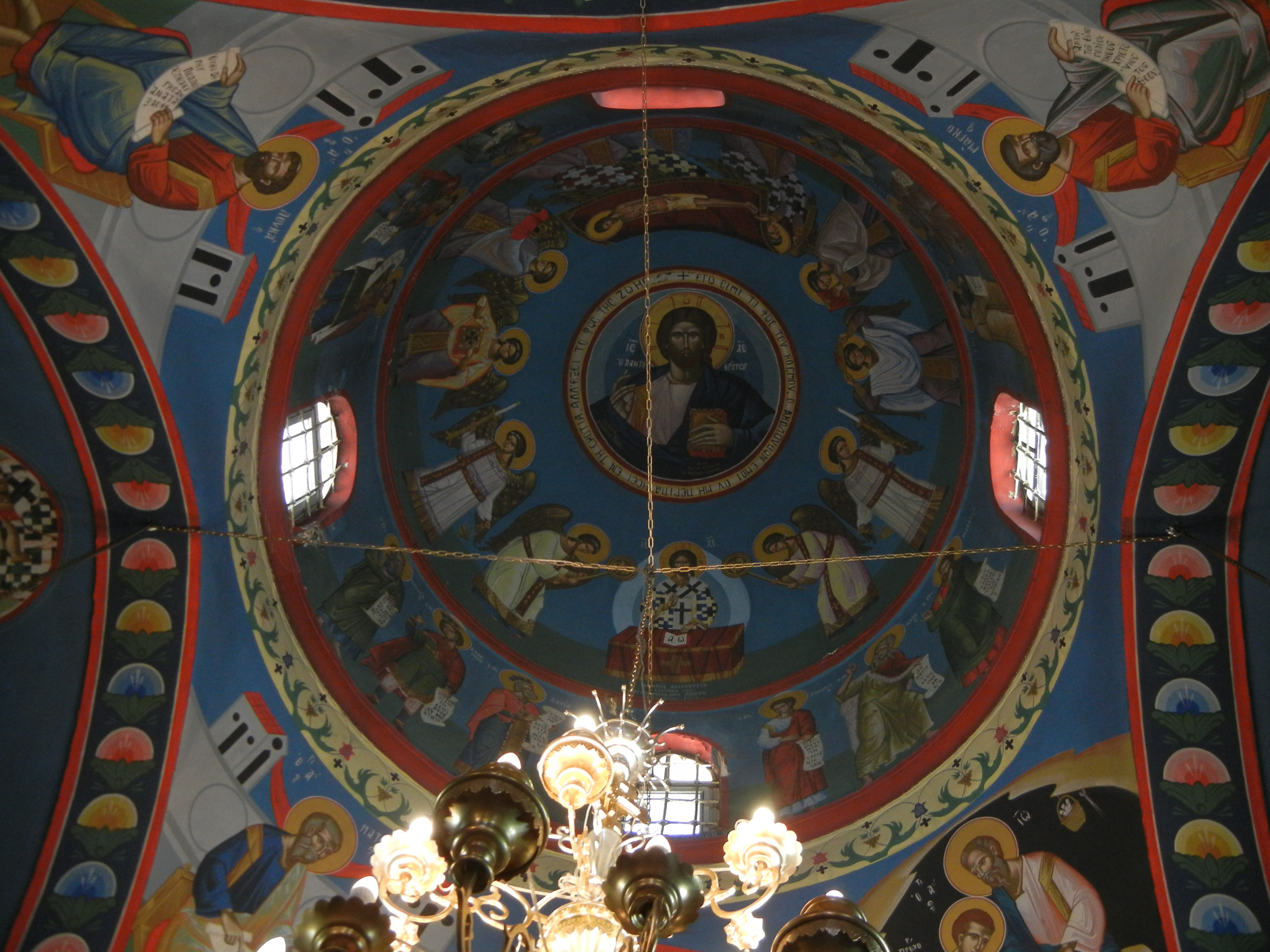

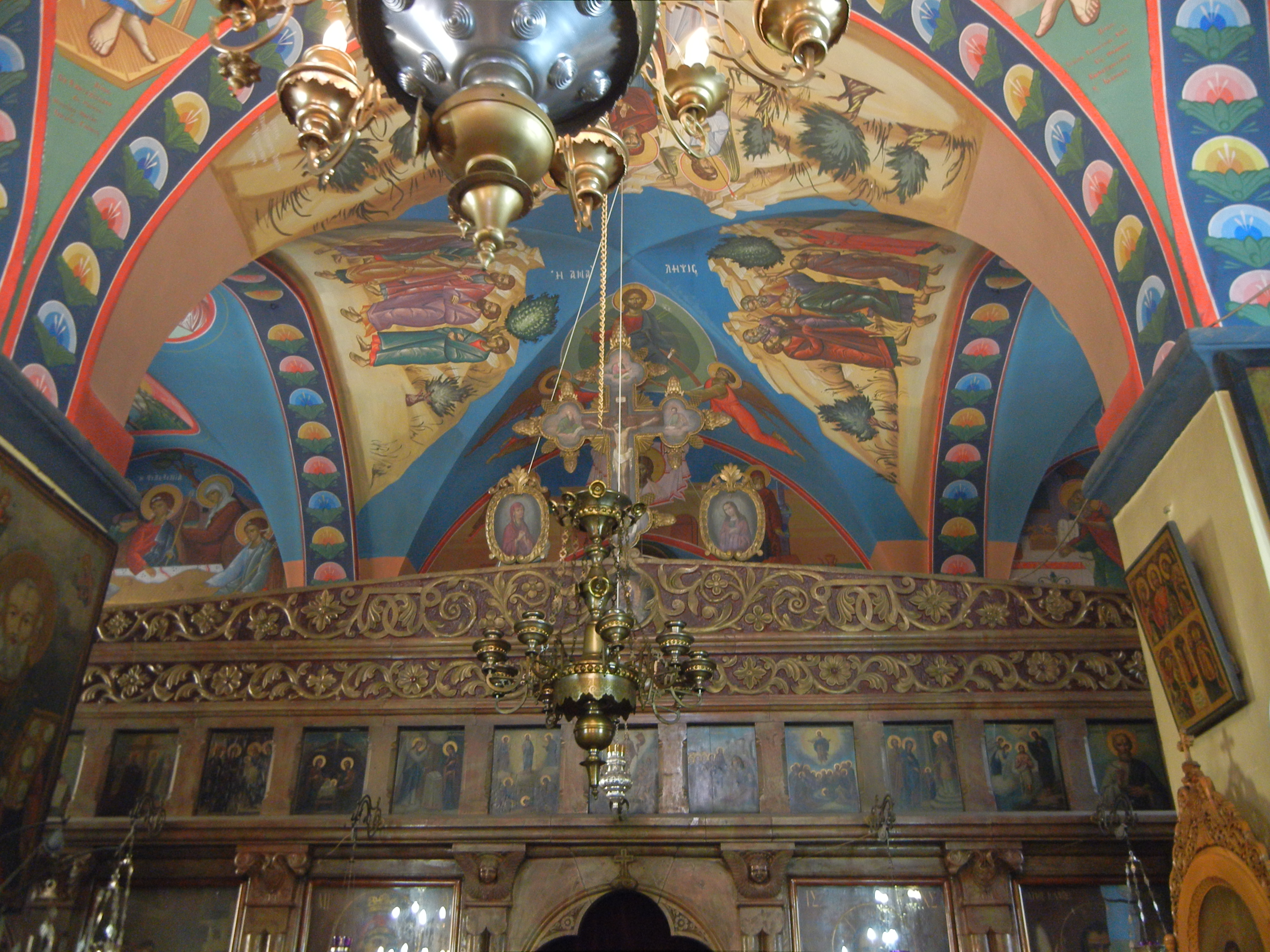

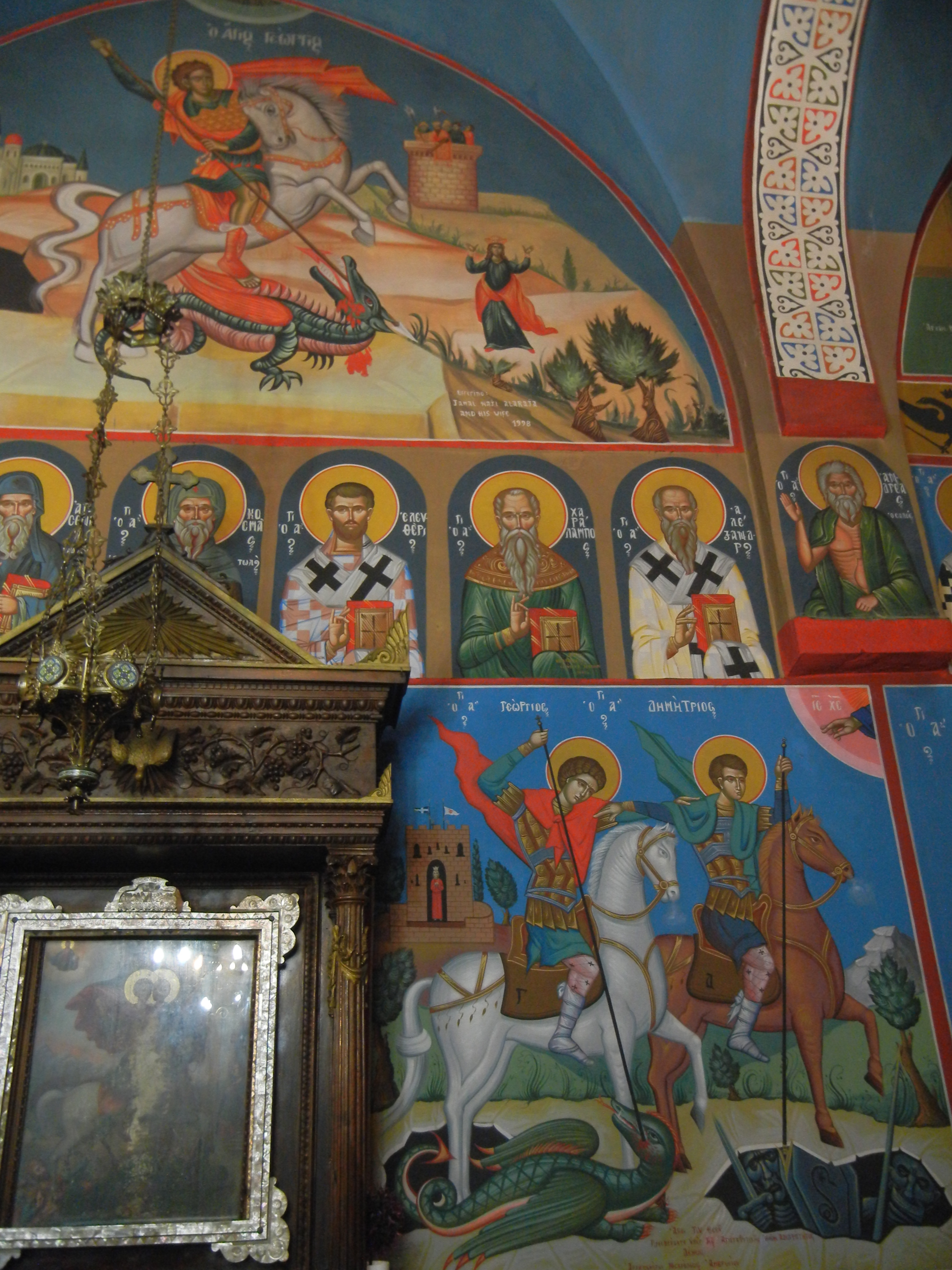

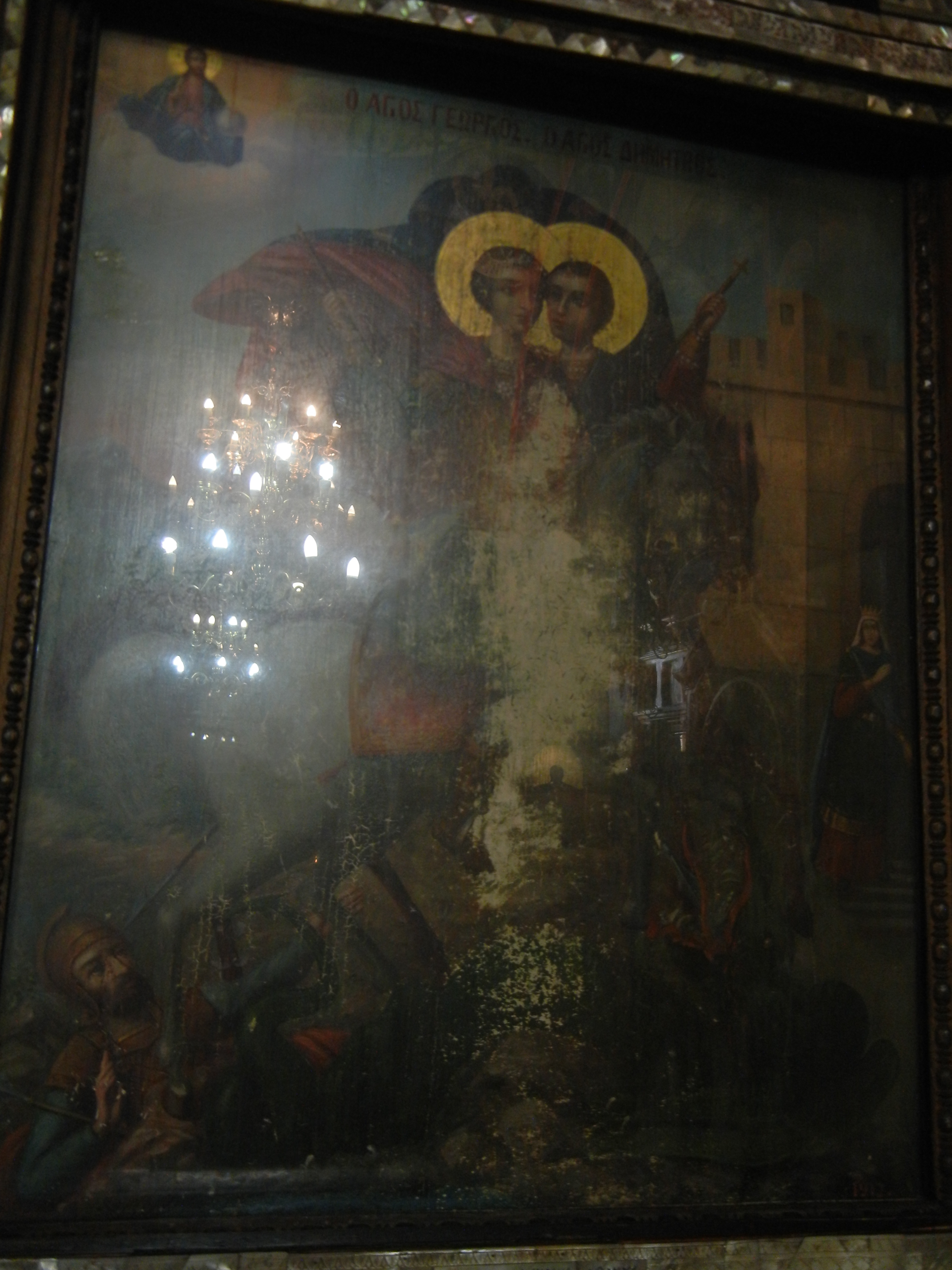

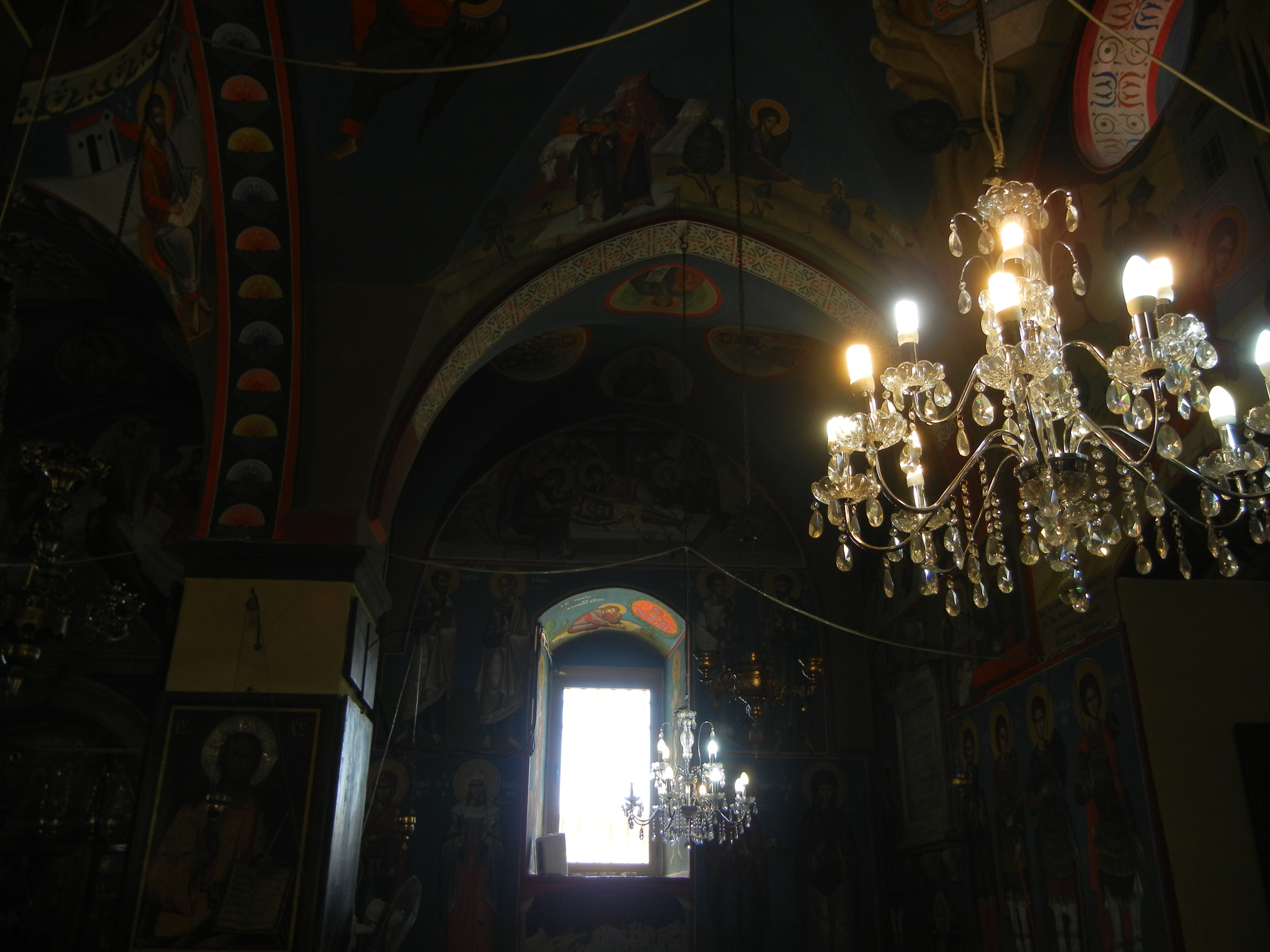

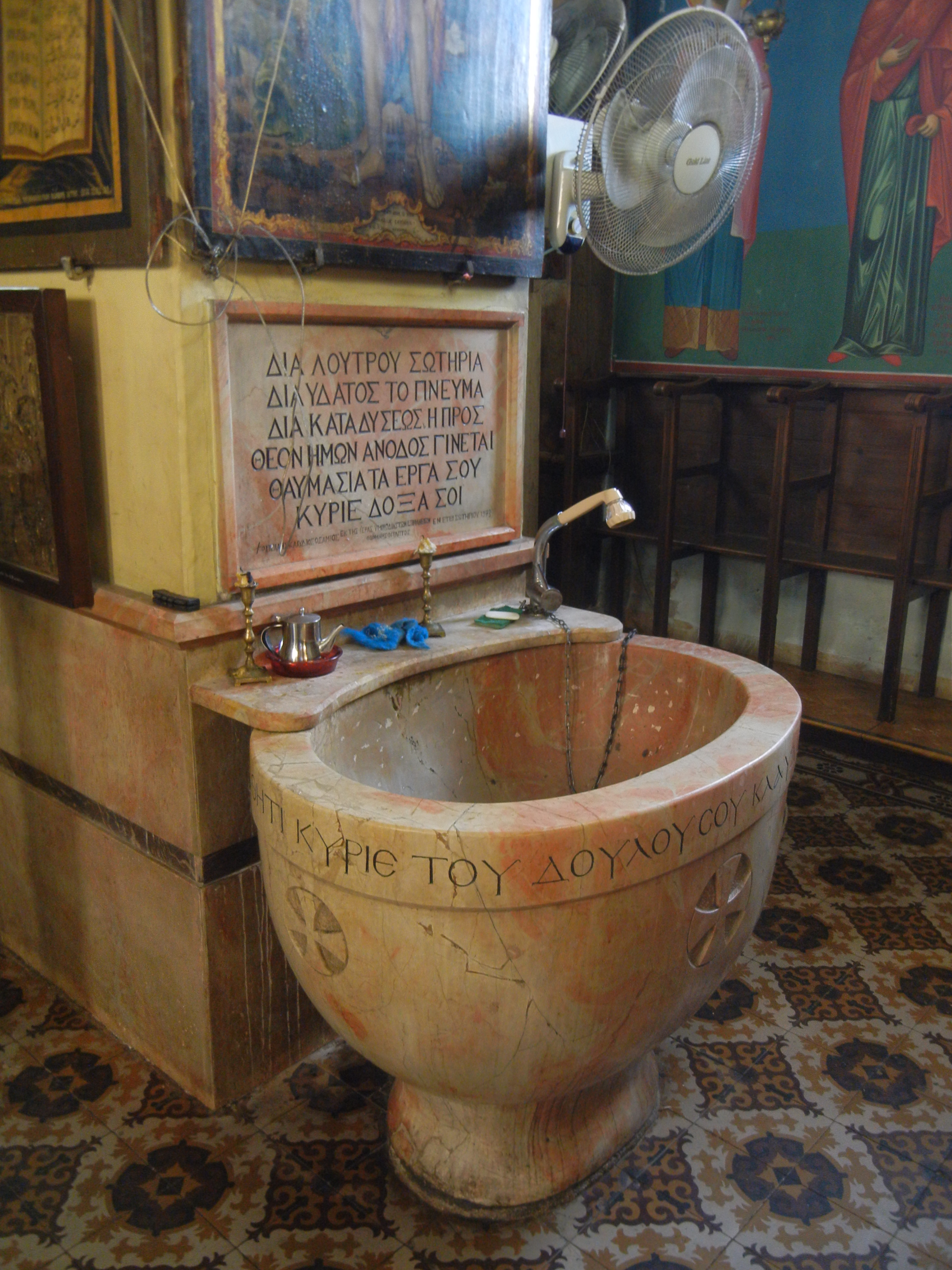

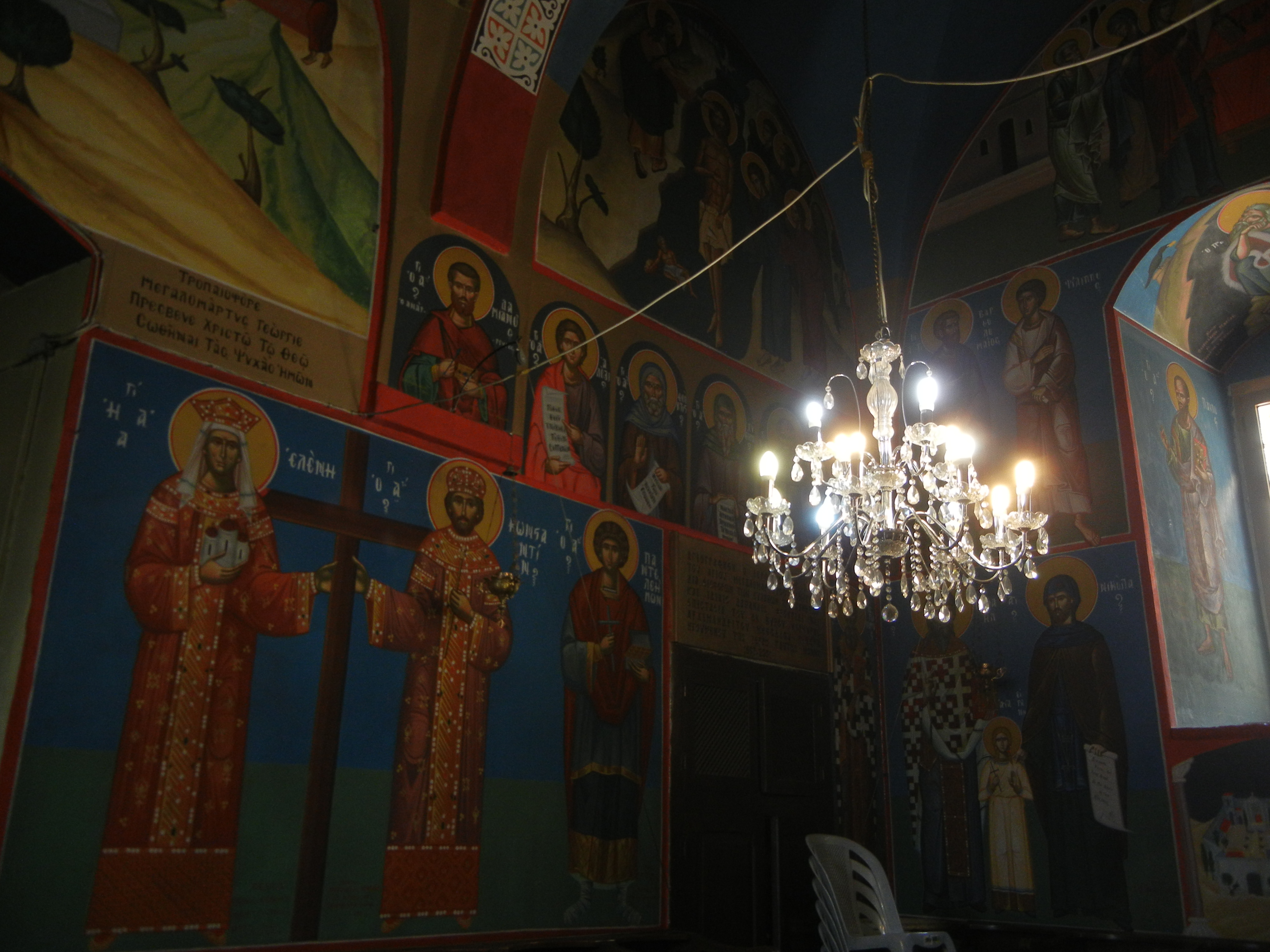

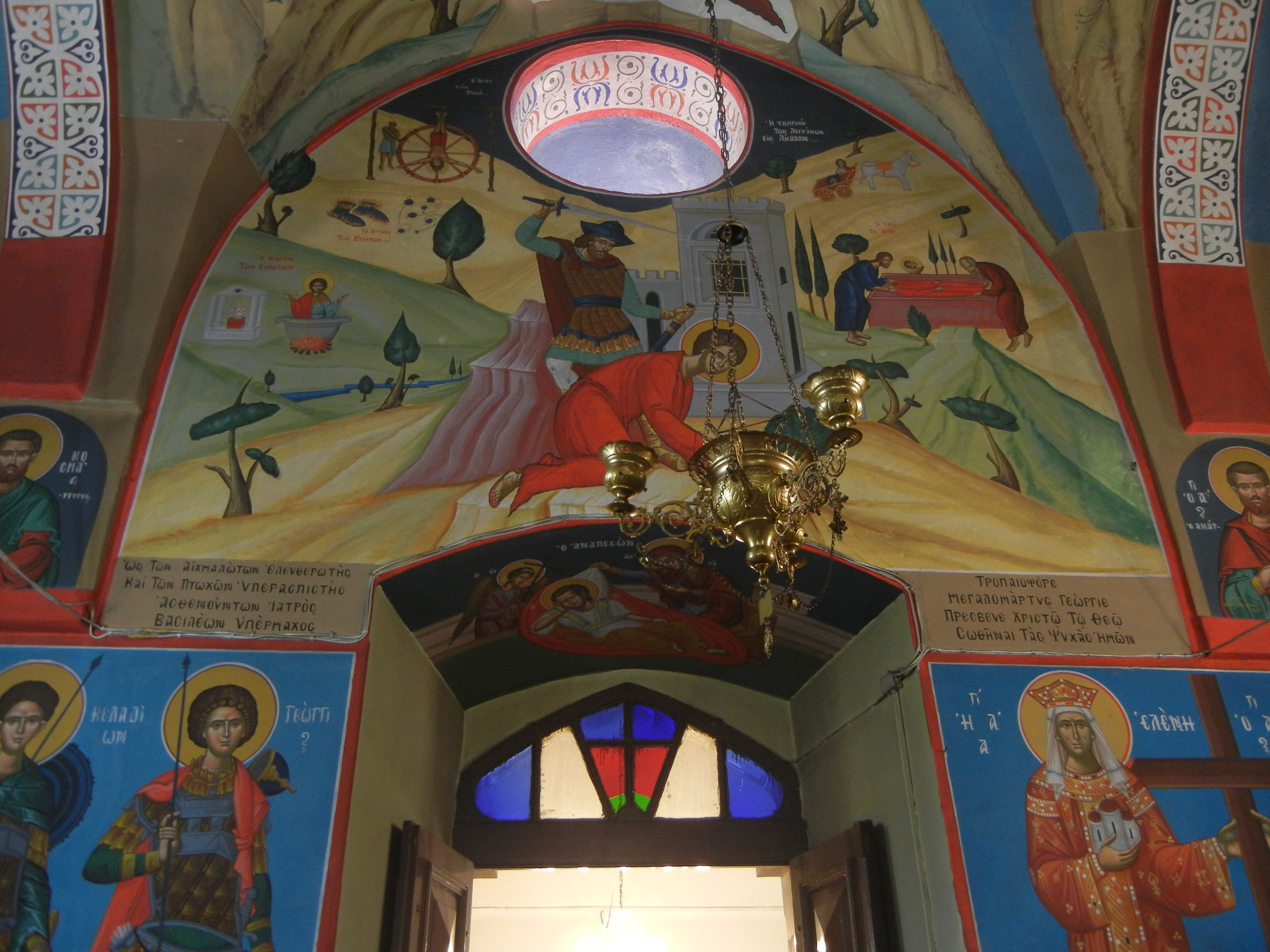

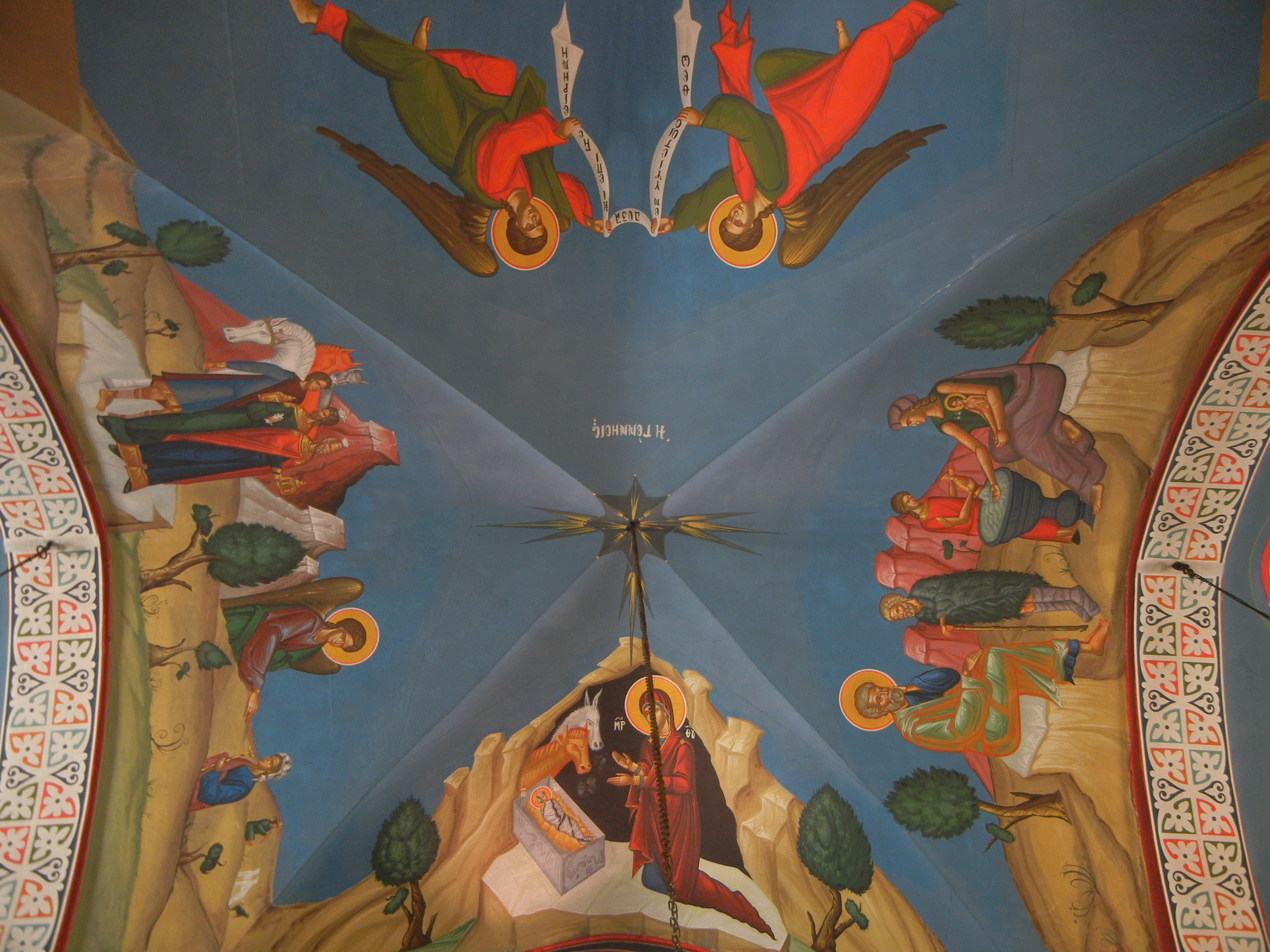

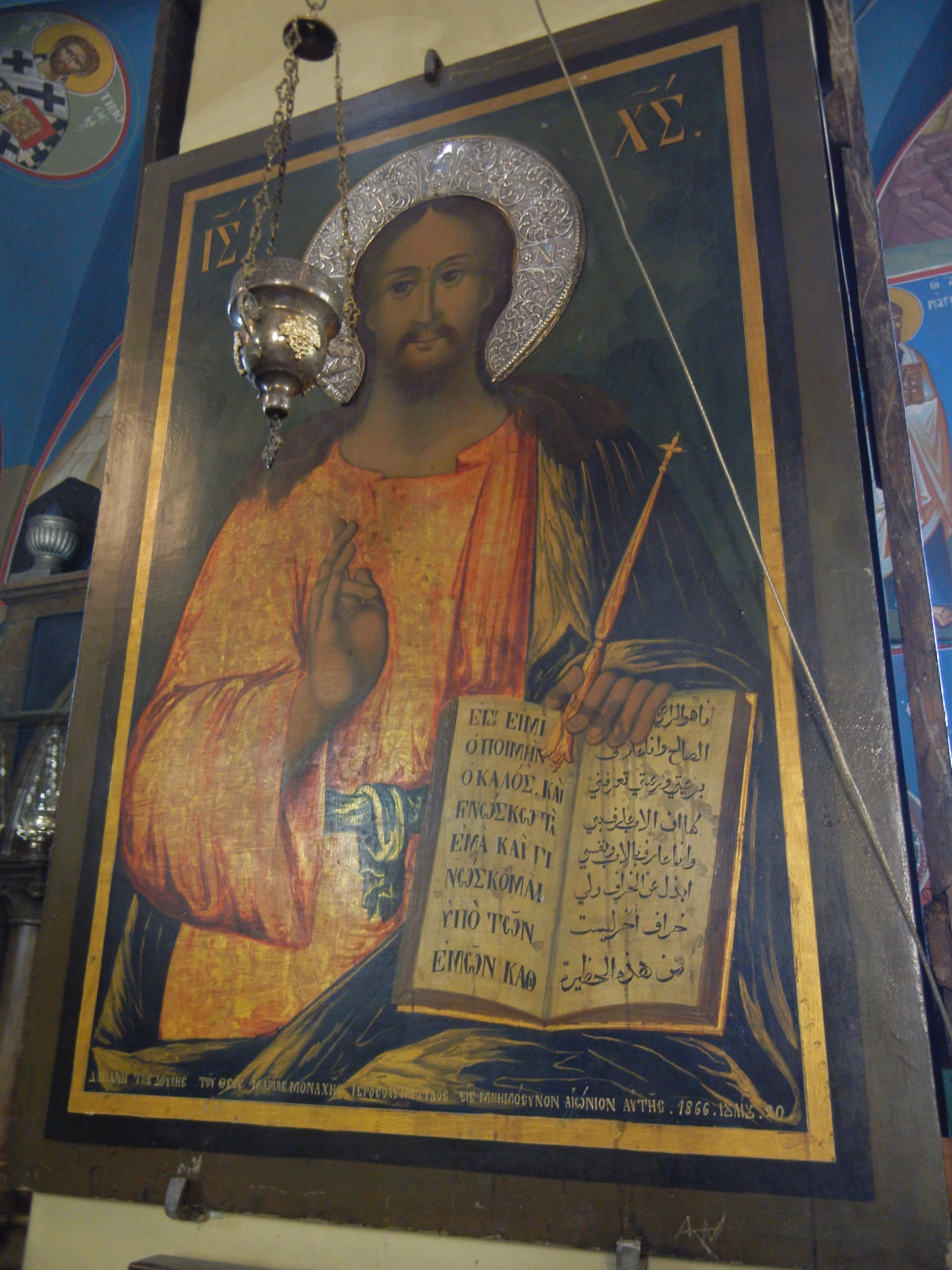

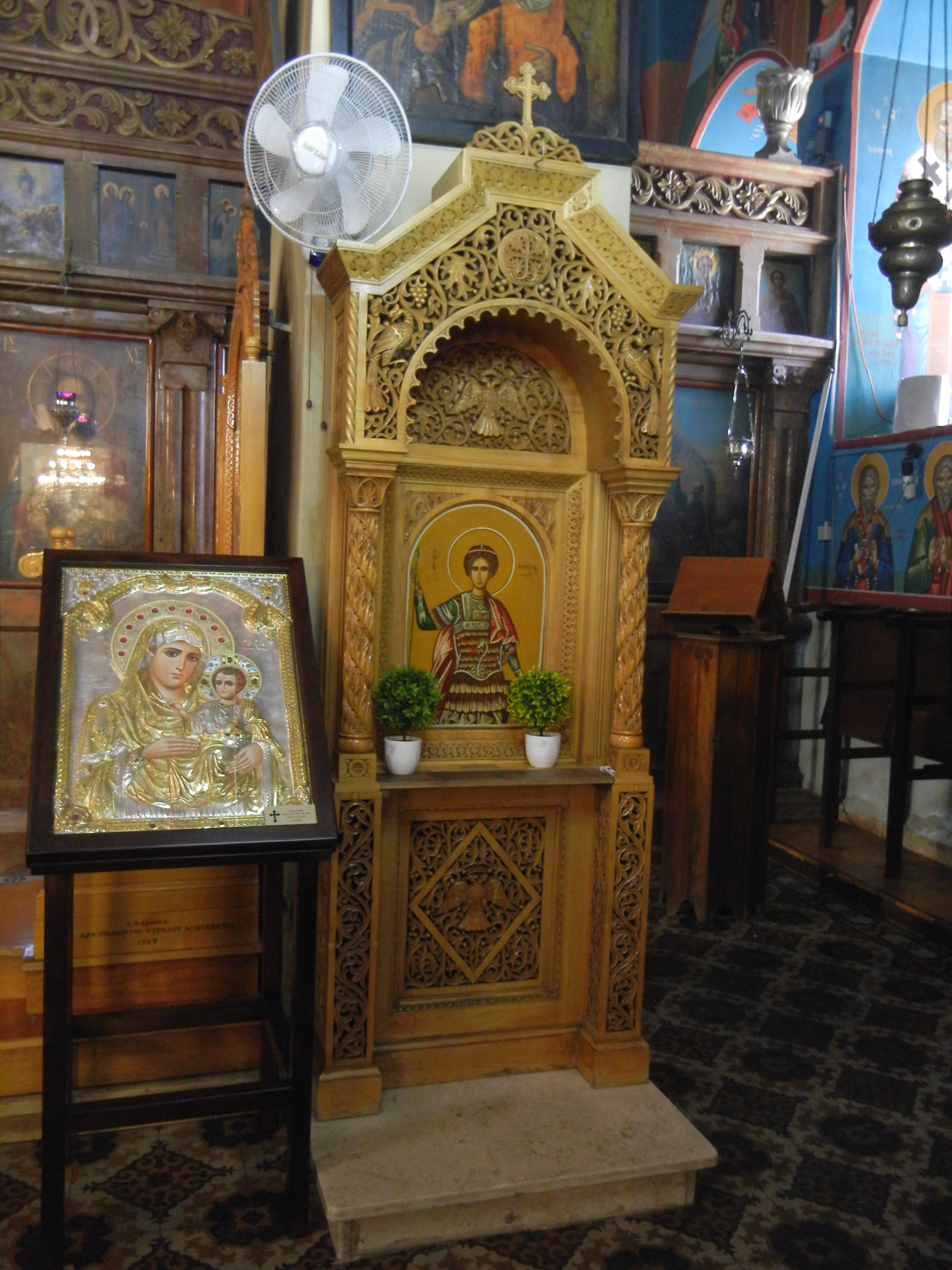

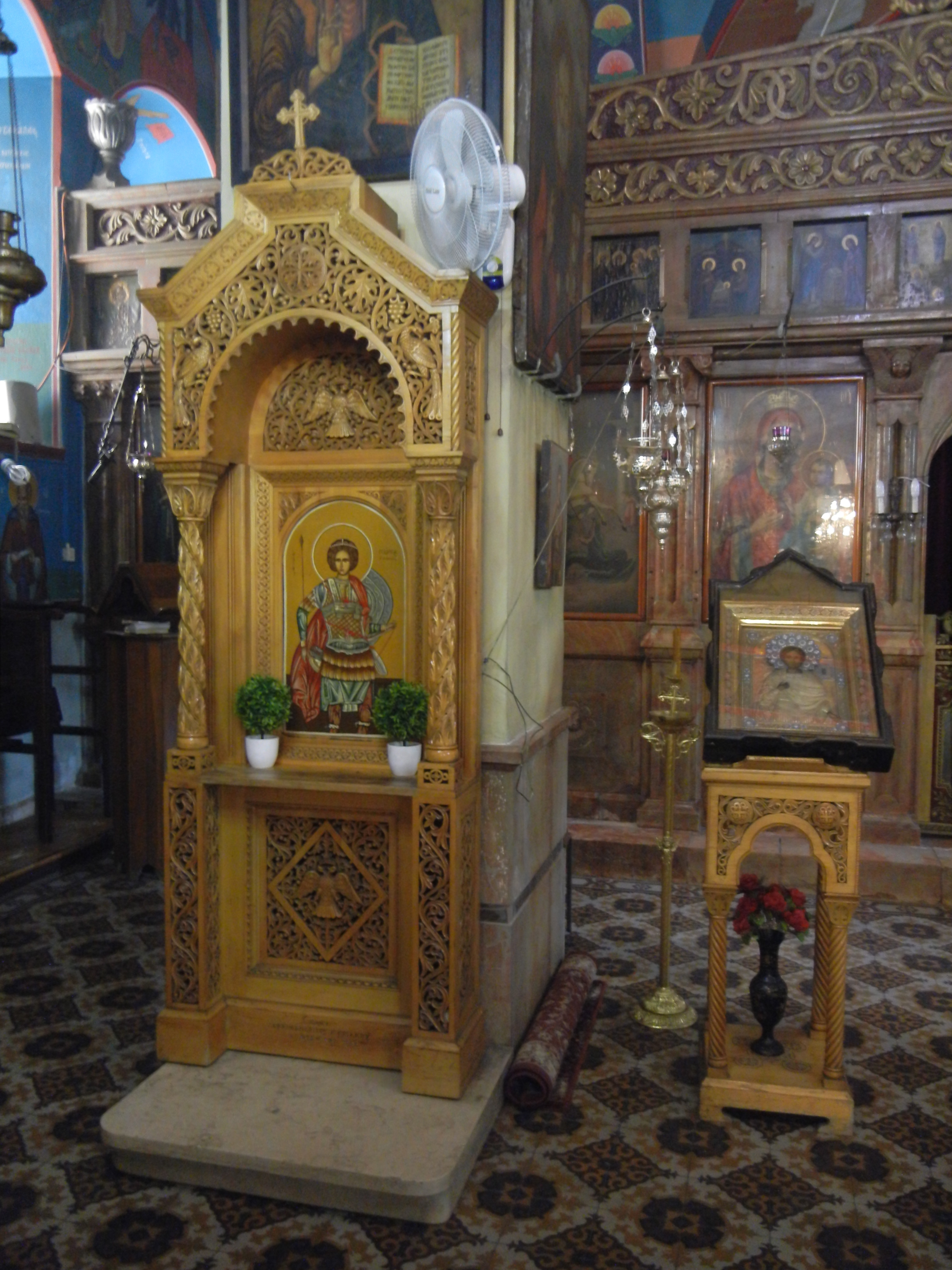

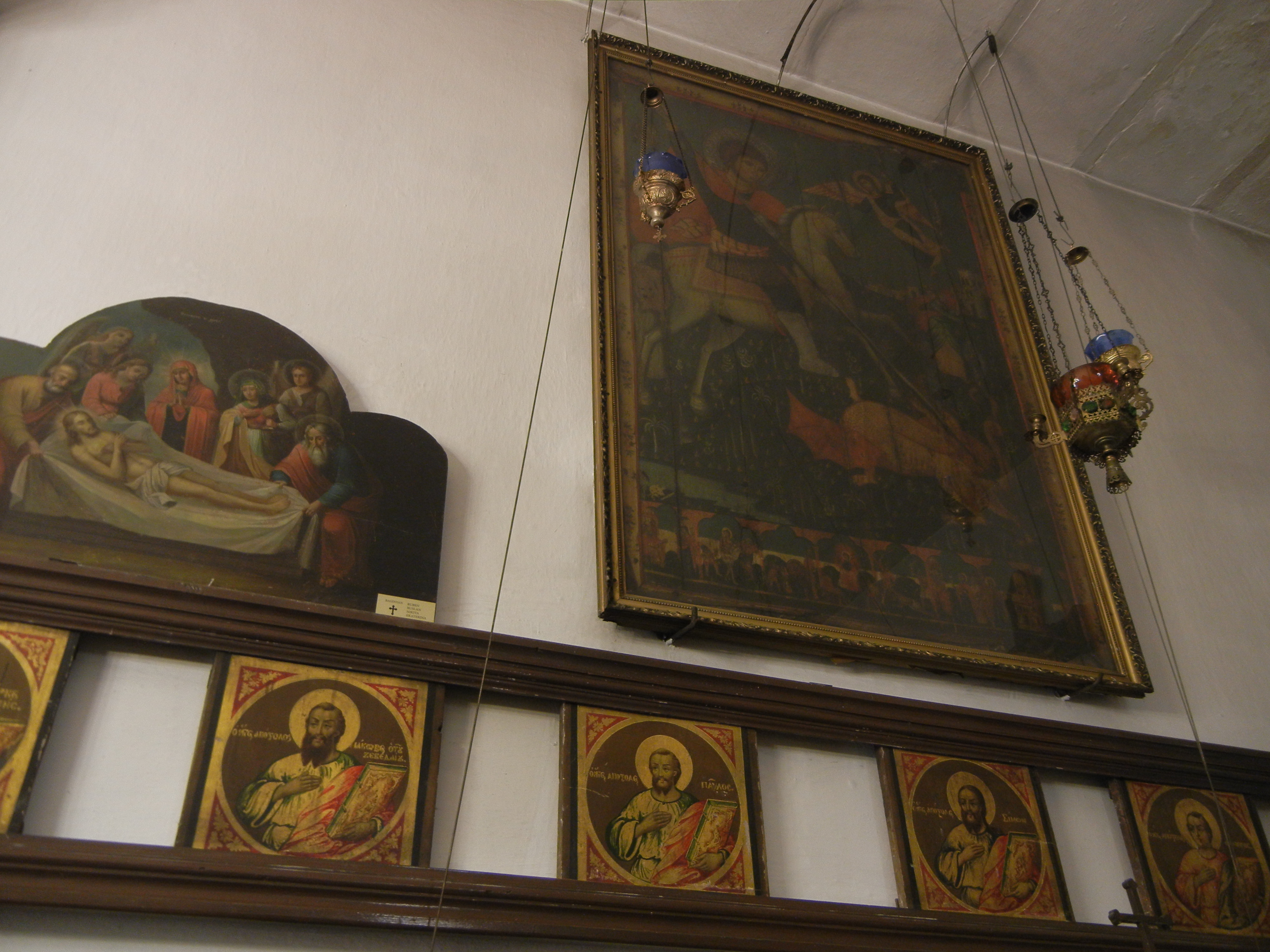

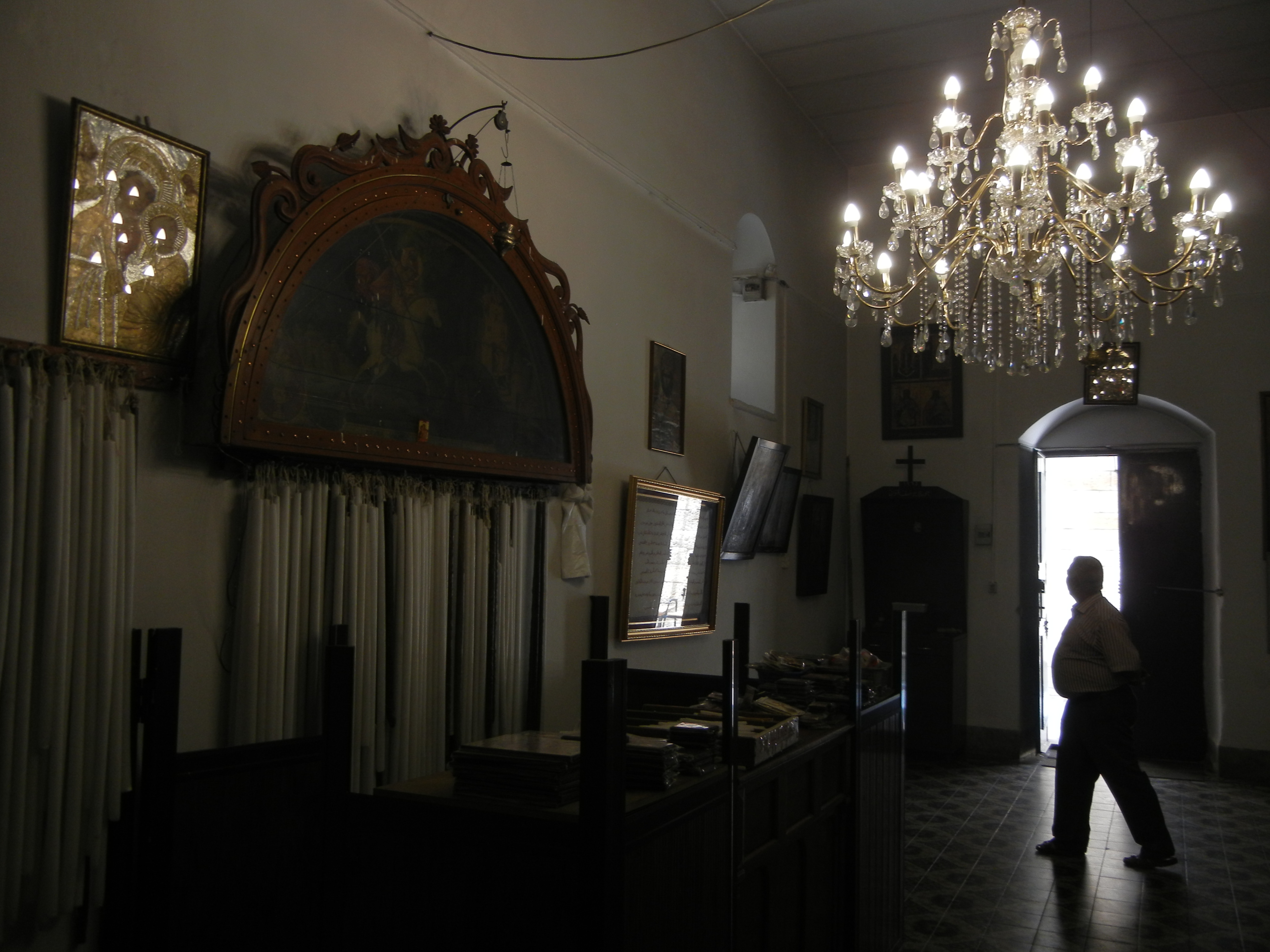

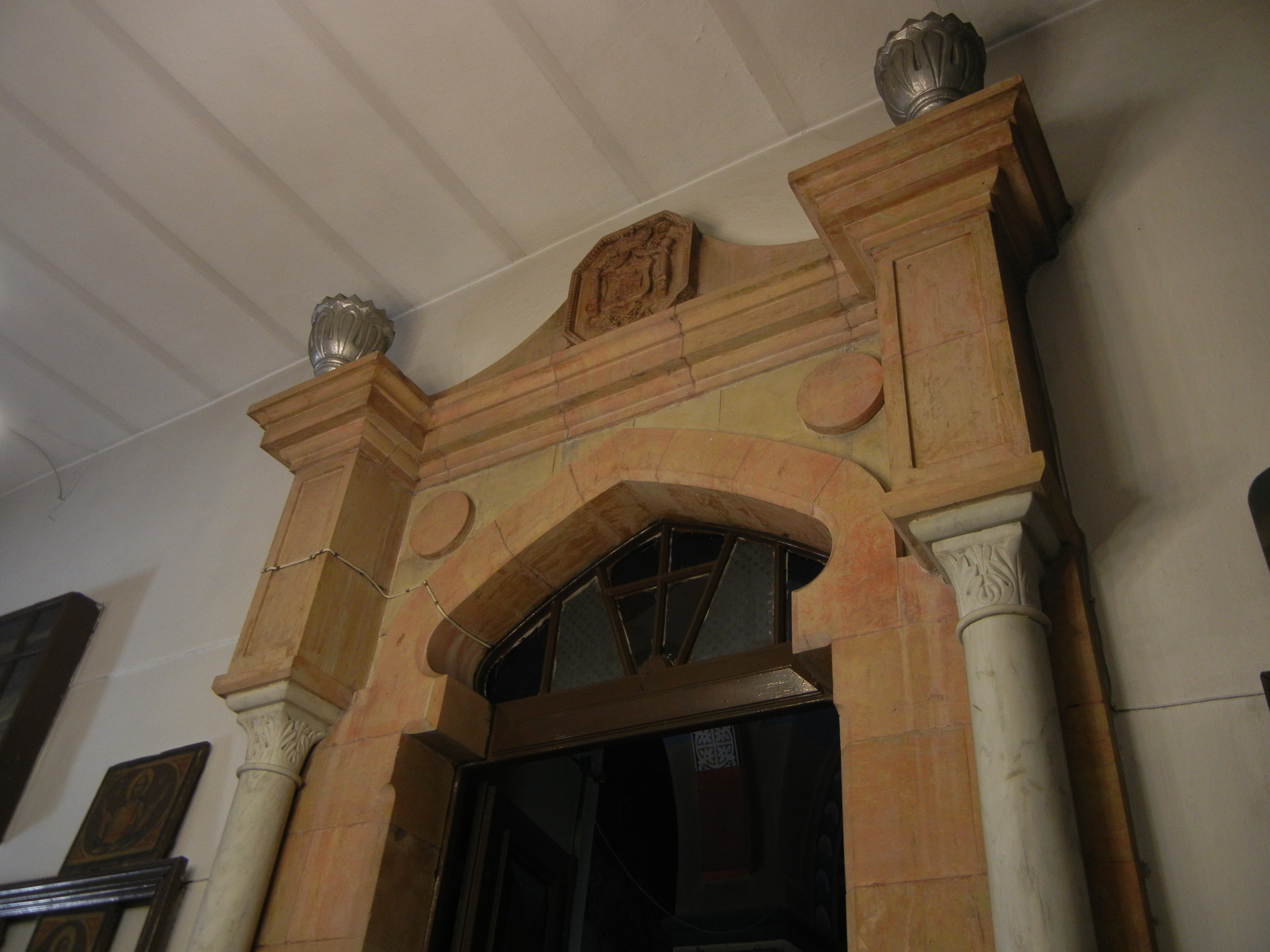

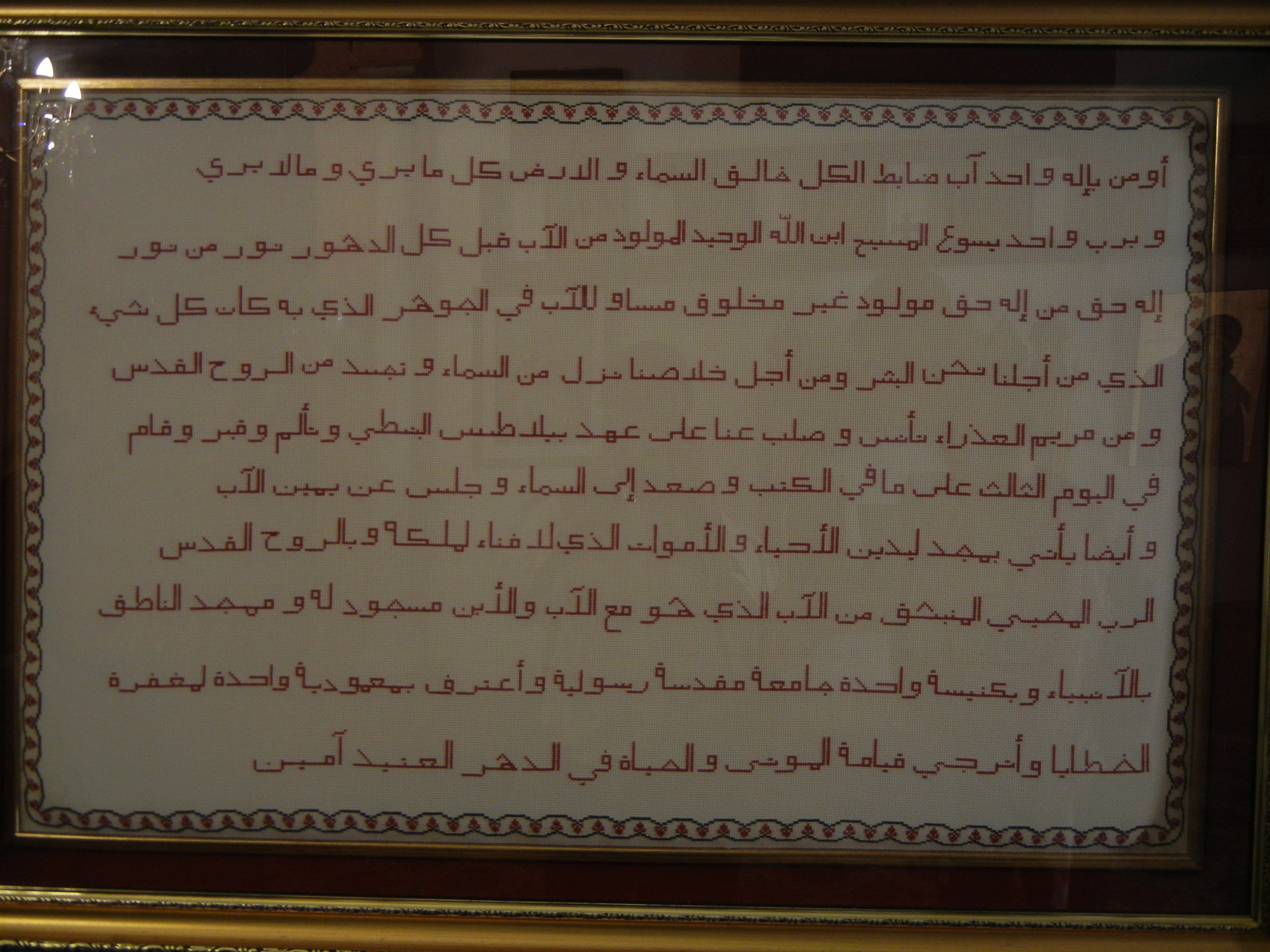

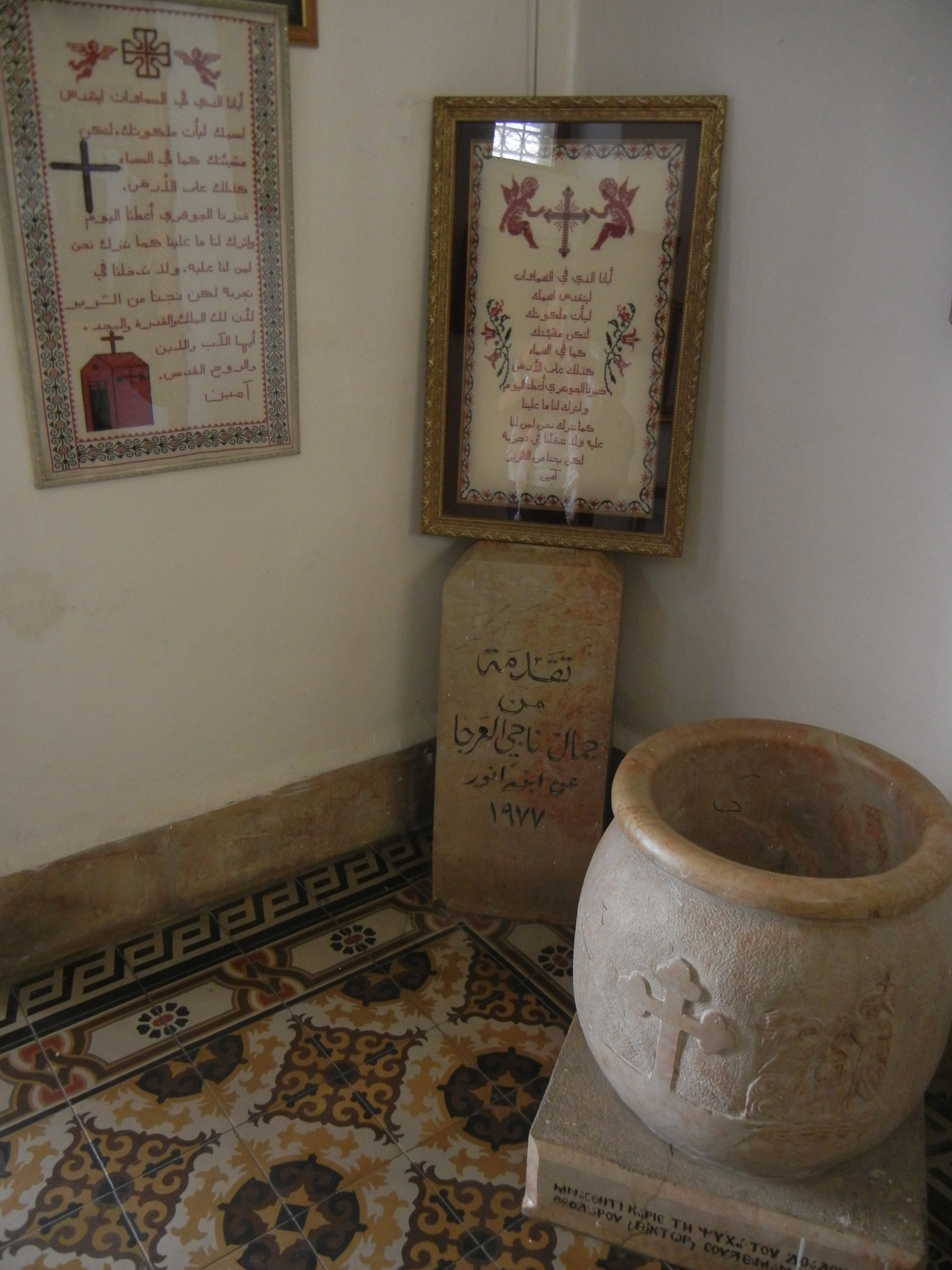

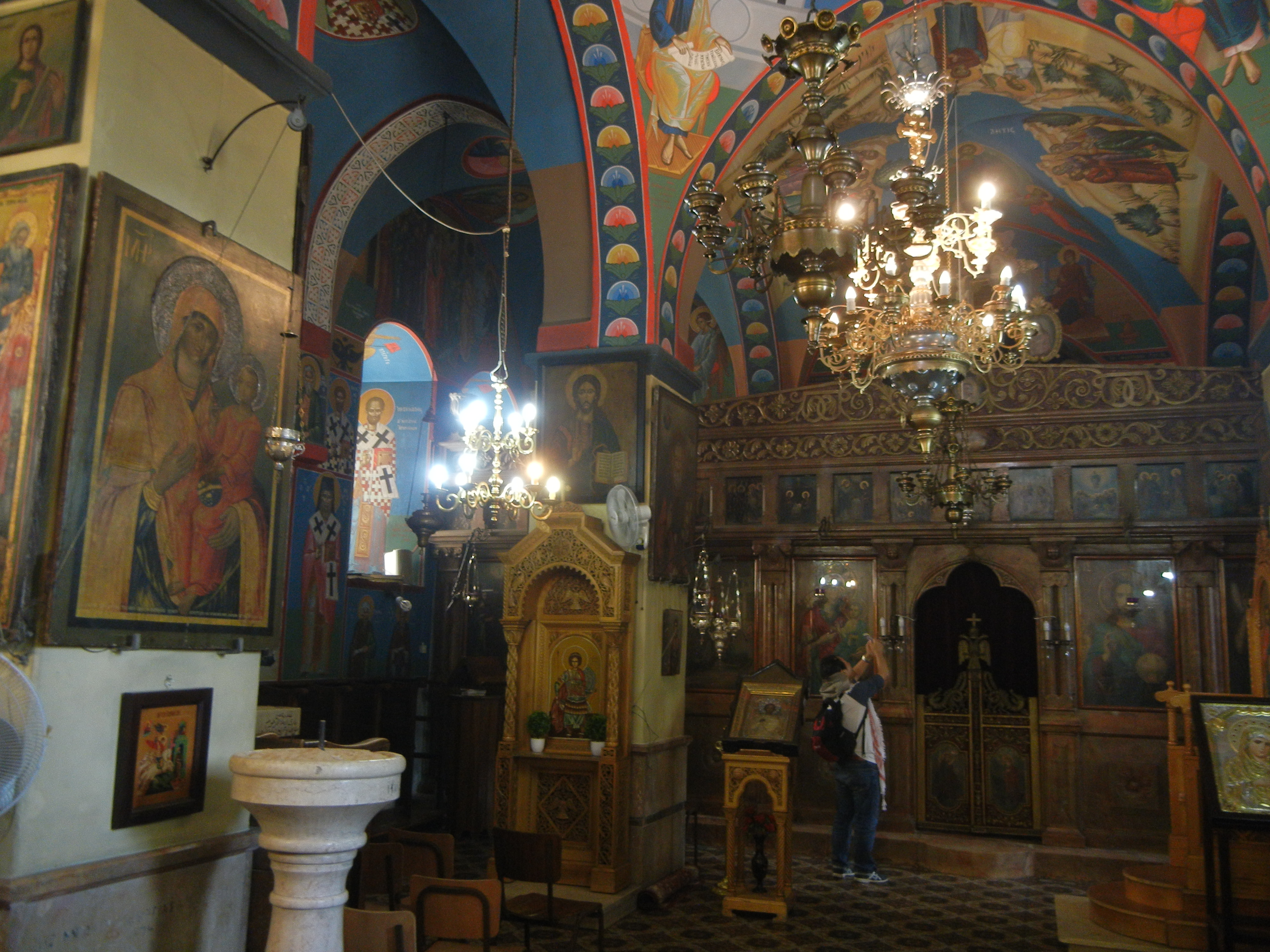

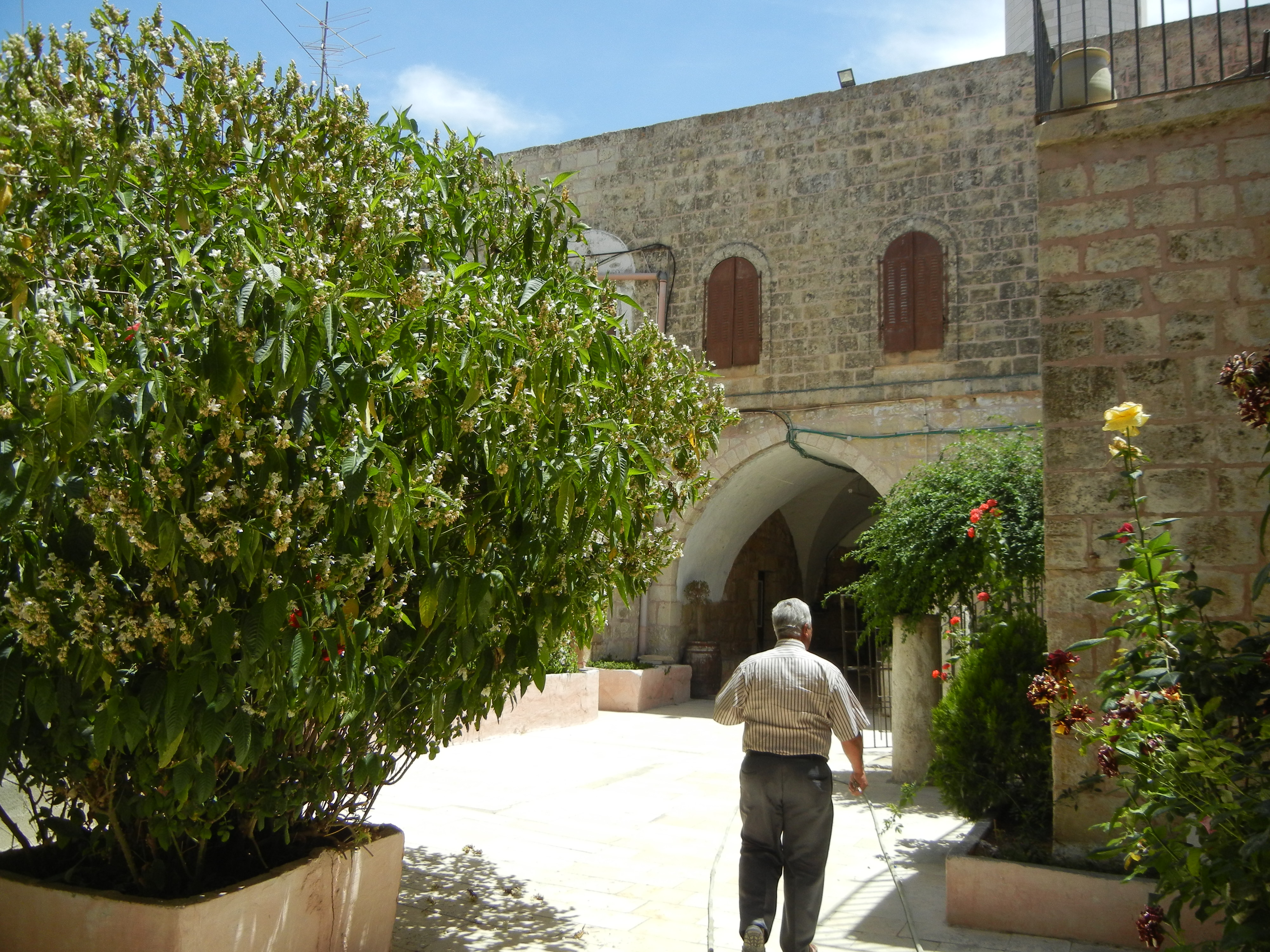

== See also ==
- Saint George: Devotions, traditions and prayers
- St George's Church (disambiguation)
- Feast of Saint George (Palestine)
- Saint George (disambiguation)
- Church of Saint George (Tulkarm)
- Dome of Al-Khidr
- Church of Saint George and Mosque of Al-Khadr

== Bibliography ==
- Baldensperger, Philip J. (1906). "The immovable east". Quarterly Statement - Palestine Exploration Fund. 38: 102 190.
- Conder, C.R.; Kitchener, H. H. (1883). The Survey of Western Palestine: Memoirs of the Topography, Orography, Hydrography, and Archaeology. Vol. 3. London: Committee of the Palestine Exploration Fund.
- Fabri, F. (1893). Felix Fabri (circa 1480–1483 A.D.) vol II, part I. Palestine Pilgrims' Text Society.
- Guérin, V. (1869). Description Géographique Historique et Archéologique de la Palestine (in French). Vol. 1: Judee, pt. 3. Paris: L'Imprimerie Nationale.
- Pococke, R. (1745). A description of the East, and some other countries. Vol. 2. London: Printed for the author, by W. Bowyer.
- Poloner, John (1894). John Poloner's description of the Holy Land (ca. A.D. 1421). Palestine Pilgrims' Text Society.
- Pringle, D. (1993). The Churches of the Crusader Kingdom of Jerusalem: A-K (excluding Acre and Jerusalem). Vol. I. Cambridge University Press. ISBN 0-521-39036-2.
- Robinson, E.; Smith, E. (1841). Biblical Researches in Palestine, Mount Sinai and Arabia Petraea: A Journal of Travels in the year 1838. Vol. 1. Boston: Crocker & Brewster.
- Robinson, E.; Smith, E. (1841). Biblical Researches in Palestine, Mount Sinai and Arabia Petraea: A Journal of Travels in the year 1838. Vol. 2. Boston: Crocker & Brewster.
- Socin, A. (1879). "Alphabetisches Verzeichniss von Ortschaften des Paschalik Jerusalem". Zeitschrift des Deutschen Palästina-Vereins. 2: 135–163.
