= Estonian anti-German resistance movement 1941–1944 =

The Estonian resistance movement (Estonian Eesti vastupanuliikumine) was an underground movement to resist the occupation of Estonia by Nazi Germany, 1941–1944 during World War II. Due to the unusually benign measures implemented in Estonia by the German occupation authorities, especially in contrast to the preceding harsh Soviet occupation of Estonia (1940–1941), the movement was slower to develop effective tactics on a wide scale than in other occupied countries.

== Background ==
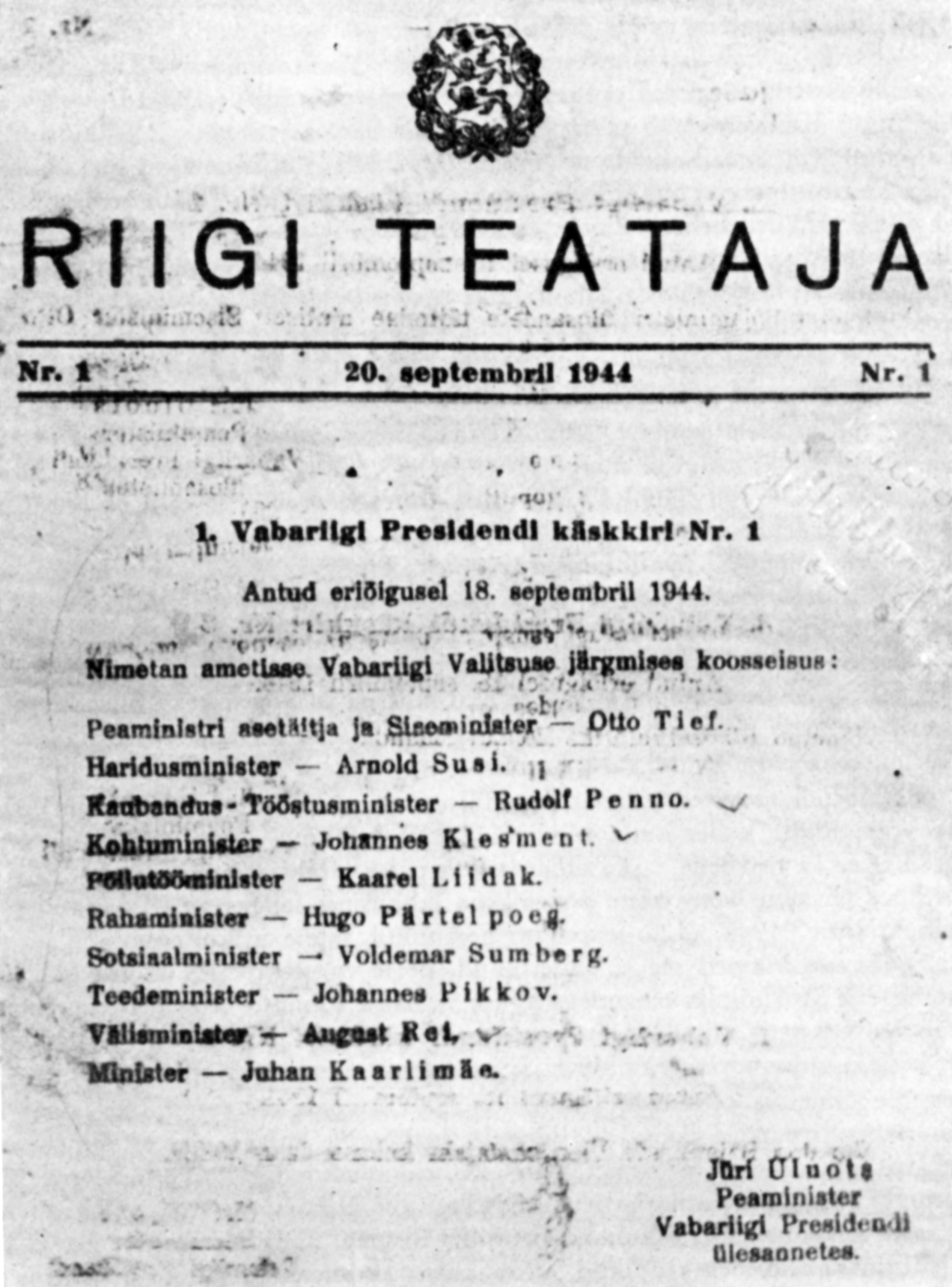
The September 18, 1944 appointed Government of Estonia in Riigi Teataja

While there was a general mood of gratitude towards Germany as the liberator of Estonia from Soviet occupation, this reservoir of goodwill dissipated within the first months of the war and was transformed into a mood ranging from resigned indifference to active hostility. Former Prime Minister Jüri Uluots' request to the German occupation authorities for the establishment of an independent Estonian Government was rejected and Adolf Hitler subsequently appointed Alfred Rosenberg as Reichkommissar. After it became clear that the Germans were against the restoration of independence of the Estonian state, this negative relationship between the new occupiers and the occupied was sealed. Public resentment began to grow against Germany from 1942 with the imposition of conscription for men into the police battalions, the introduction of the labour draft and the reduction of food rations, while the Estonian Self-Administration was held in contempt for attempting to enforce this conscription. Hjalmar Mäe, the head of the Self-Administration, became quickly unpopular for his criticism of President Konstantin Päts. He had been imprisoned by Päts' regime in 1935 for taking part of an alleged coup. Germans offered his position several times to Jüri Uluots, who refused.

The Estonian people regarded German occupation with greater bitterness than the previous 1917–1918 German occupation and were repelled by the implementation of the German race laws and the indifferent exploitation of the country's natural resources. One Dutch Nazi visiting Estonia in June 1942 commented upon the "chauvinist national consciousness" of the Estonian people and no genuine Germanophile could be found.

== Pro-independence resistance ==
An underground resistance movement, whose members looked to the western Allies for support, developed that reflected the political divisions that existed before 1940, ranging from Päts loyalists to the opposition groups such as the National Centre and Socialist Workers parties. The resistance, which was expressed through a campaign of non-compliance co-ordinated by the underground movement and a clandestine press, was favoured by the geographical proximity to Sweden and Finland where the organised political resistance in Tartu and Tallinn were able to maintain contact with London and Stockholm via the Estonian Envoy to Finland and a fortnightly fast motorboat connection between Tallinn and Stockholm.

Initially a number of underground organisations existed such as the Free Estonia Front (Vaba Eesti Võitlusrinne, VEVR) which was established in August 1942 and headed by Juhan Reigo and Endel Inglist. The VEVR published an anti-Nazi newspaper Vaba Eesti (Free Estonia), issuing 14 editions. Another underground newspaper titled Võitlev Eestlane (Fighting Estonian) was published by a group within the editorial staff of the newspaper Postimees. In the autumn of 1941, the precursor to the National Committee of the Republic of Estonia was founded by Heinrich Mark, Ants Oras and Jaan Ots. The organisation was headed by Ernst Kull in 1943 and it was through his efforts that the various groups were merged into a unified opposition to Nazi rule.

In June 1942 political leaders of Estonia who had survived Soviet repressions held a hidden meeting from the occupying powers in Estonia where the formation of an underground Estonian government and the options for preserving continuity of the republic were discussed. On January 6, 1943, a meeting was held at the Estonian foreign delegation in Stockholm. It was decided that, in order to preserve the legal continuity of the Republic of Estonia, the last constitutional prime minister, Jüri Uluots, must continue to fulfill his responsibilities as prime minister.

The movement subsequently formed the National Committee of the Republic of Estonia (Estonian: Eesti Vabariigi Rahvuskomitee) in March 1944. The original initiative to form the committee came from the Estonian pre-war opposition parties but it was quickly joined by Jüri Uluots, the last constitutional pre-war Prime Minister of the Republic of Estonia and his supporters. The Committee aimed to establish a provisional government during expected German withdrawal as the Red Army had reached the border of Estonia on 2 February 1944. By April 1944 a large number of the committee members were arrested by the German security agencies. While some 200 people were arrested, the leaders of the resistance movement escaped arrest however their activities were severely curtailed until mid June. In June 1944 the elector's assembly of the Republic of Estonia gathered in secrecy from the occupying powers in Tallinn and appointed Jüri Uluots as the prime minister with the responsibilities of the President. On 21 June 1944 Jüri Uluots appointed Otto Tief as deputy prime minister. On 18 September 1944 Uluots, suffering from cancer, named Otto Tief the Acting Prime Minister and appointed a Government which consisted of 11 members. Tief assumed office in accordance with the constitution and took the opportunity with the departure of the Germans to declare the legitimate Estonian government restored. The Estonian national government was proclaimed in Estonia, the Estonian military units seized the government buildings in Toompea and ordered the German forces to leave. The flag of Germany was replaced with the Estonian tricolour in the Pikk Hermann, the flag tower of the seat of the Government. Tief's government failed to keep control, attempting to organise the defence of the capital city against the advancing Red Army making use of the men who had fought in the Finnish Infantry Regiment 200 and a military unit organised by Johan Pitka, the Germans overran the headquarters of Admiral Pitka in Tallinn and it is presumed he was subsequently killed in the ensuing battle. Most of the members and officials were caught, jailed, deported, or executed by the advancing Soviets.

== Pro-Soviet resistance ==
A small number of Estonians were involved in underground resistance during World War II ranging from producing illegal publications, to espionage, to violent sabotage. They included Rein Alasoo, Evald Laasi, Georgi Loik, Aleksander Looring, as well as others.

== See also ==
- Soviet partisans in Estonia
- Anti-fascism
- Category:Military history of Estonia during World War II
- Occupation of Estonia by Nazi Germany
- Resistance during World War II
