= Soviet occupation of the Baltic states (1944) =

The Soviet Union (USSR) occupied most of the territory of the Baltic states in its 1944 Baltic Offensive during World War II. The Red Army regained control over the three Baltic capitals and encircled retreating Wehrmacht and Latvian forces in the Courland Pocket, where they held out until the final German surrender at the end of the war.

== Soviet offensives and re-occupation ==
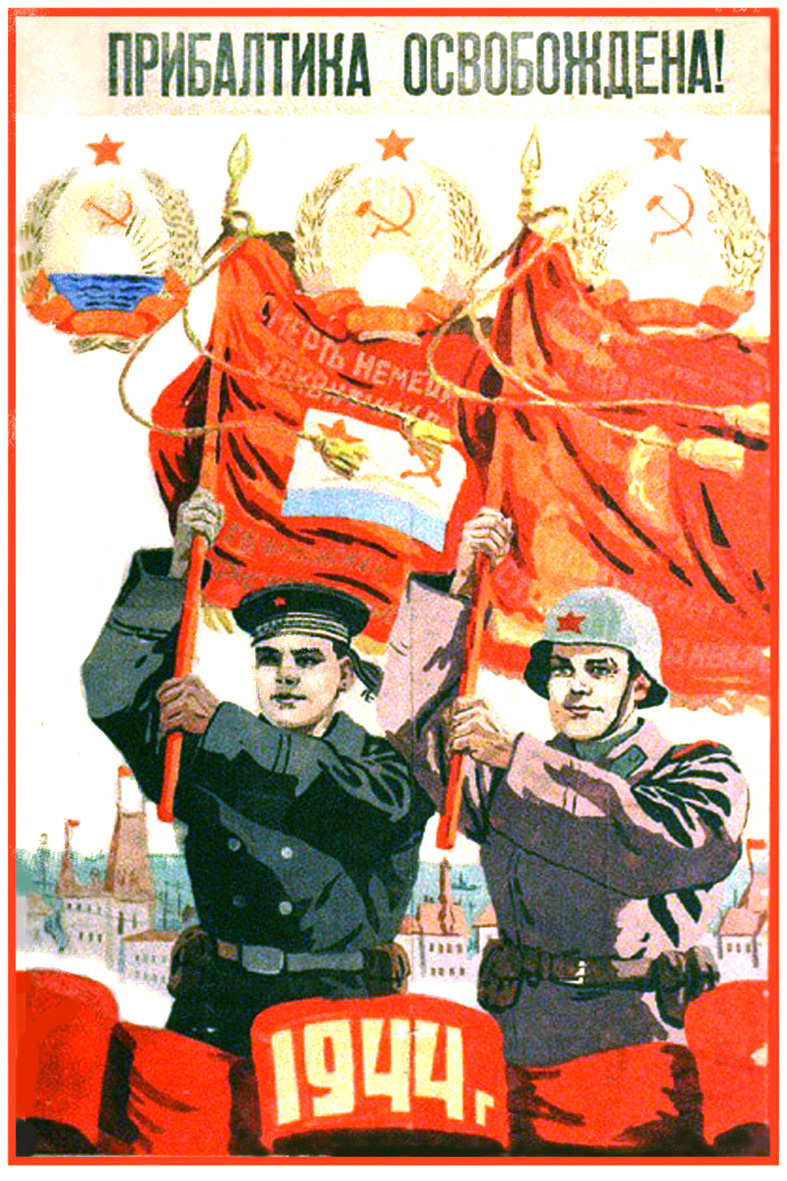
A Soviet propaganda poster celebrating "liberation" of the Baltic states in 1944

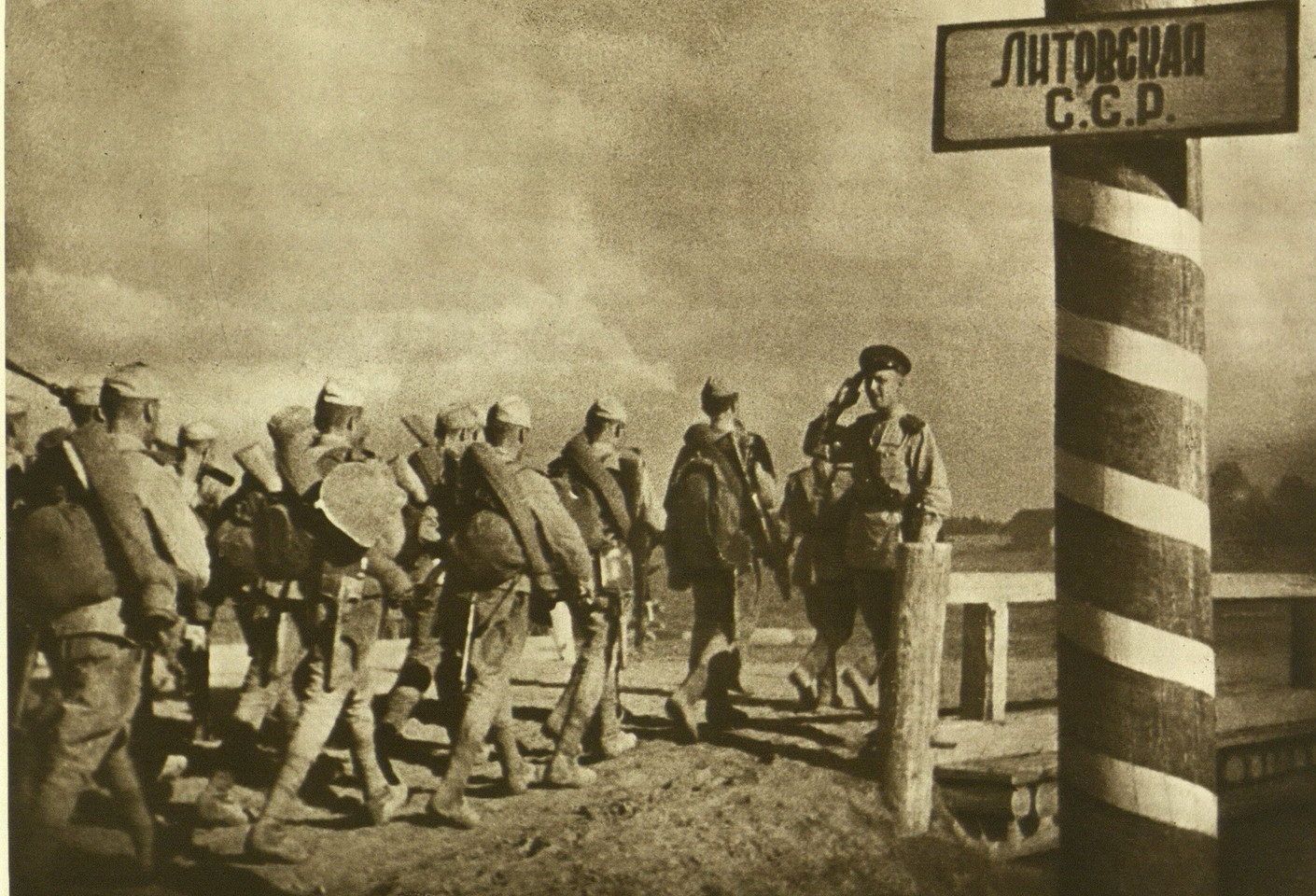
Soldiers of the Red Army entering the territory of the Lithuanian SSR

The day is not far off when we will completely liberate the Ukraine, and the White Russia, Leningrad and Kalinin regions from the enemy; when we will liberate … the people of the Crimea and Lithuania, Latvia, Estonia, Moldavia and Karelo-Finnish Republic.
—Joseph Stalin in a public speech broadcast in Moscow during the Second Battle of Kiev, November 1943

By 2 February 1944, the siege of Leningrad was over and Soviet troops after the Battle of Narva were on the border with Estonia. Having failed to break through at the Battle of Tannenberg Line, the Soviets launched the Tartu Offensive on 10 August, and the Baltic Offensive on 14 September, with forces totalling 1.5 million. Oberkommando des Heeres (High Command of the German Army) issued Operation Aster on 16 September, whereby the Estonian forces would cover the German withdrawal.

Soon after the Soviet reoccupation of the Estonian capital Tallinn, the first mission of the NKVD was to stop anyone escaping from the country. Many refugees escaped to Sweden or Finland, particularly the Estonian Swedes, who had lived in Aiboland (coastal Estonia) since the days of Danish and Swedish Estonia.

The NKVD also targeted members of the National Committee of the Republic of Estonia. The Estonian Forest Brothers (established in 1941) initially maintained a low profile during the Soviet reoccupation. VE Day did not bring a restoration of independence to Estonia, and the Forest Brothers then renewed their campaign of killing Soviet senior army and NKVD officers.

In Latvia, NKVD units were the main anti-partisan force fighting against 10,000 active members of the resistance forces. The Soviets signed separate ceasefire agreements with the different resistance forces, which did not become active until after the end of the war; the agreement in Lithuania differed from those in Estonia and Latvia. The Soviets introduced conscription immediately after their occupation of Vilnius in July 1944. Only 14 percent of those eligible responded to the summons. The Soviets tracked down draft evaders and killed over 400 people. During 1944 and 1945, the Soviets conscripted 82,000 Lithuanians.

== Attempts to restore independence ==
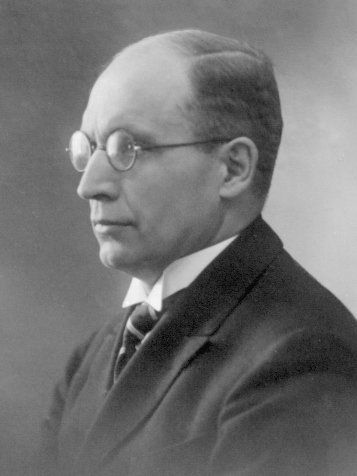
The National Committee of the Republic of Estonia, headed by Jüri Uluots, attempted to re-establish Estonian independence in 1944.

There were efforts to restore independence during the German occupation. In 1941, the Lithuanians had overthrown Soviet rule two days before the Germans arrived in Kaunas. The Germans allowed the Provisional Government to function for over a month. Towards the end of the war, once it became clear that Germany would be defeated, many Lithuanians, Latvians and Estonians joined the Germans once again.

It was hoped that by engaging in such a war, the Baltic countries would be able to attract Western support for the cause of independence from the USSR.

In Latvia, an pro-independence resistance movement called the Latvian Central Council was formed on 13 August 1943 by members of the four biggest Latvian political parties. These men survived the Soviet terror of the Soviet occupation of Latvia in 1940, still called "The Horrible Year" (Latvian: Baigais Gads) as it saw the first waves of Soviet deportations from the country.

On March 17, 1944, 189 Latvian political leaders and public figures signed the Memorandum of the Latvian Central Council, which declared the urgent need to restore the de facto sovereignty of the Republic of Latvia and create a Latvian government. The memorandum was a call to resist the reoccupation of Latvia by the Soviet Union following the defeat of Germany, which by that time was widely expected. The memorandum was drawn up in several original copies and photographically reproduced with the aim of taking it out of Latvia and getting it into the hands of the governments of the Western allies and the German occupation government.

On 8 September 1944 in Riga, the leadership of the Latvian Central Council adopted the Declaration on the Restoration of the Republic of Latvia. The adoption of the Declaration was an attempt to restore de facto independence of the Republic of Latvia, in hopes of international support and by taking advantage of the interval between changes of occupying powers. The Declaration prescribed that the Satversme is the fundamental law of the restored Republic of Latvia, and provided for establishment of a Cabinet of Ministers that would organise the restoration of the State of Latvia.

An analogous body, the Supreme Committee for the Liberation of Lithuania, emerged on 25 November 1943.

On 23 March 1944, the underground National Committee of the Estonian Republic was founded. Thousands of Estonians not willing to side with the Nazis joined the Finnish Defence Forces to fight against the Soviet Union. The Finnish Infantry Regiment 200 was formed out of the volunteers known colloquially as the "Finnish Boys" (Estonian: soomepoisid). On 2 February 1944, the front reached the former Estonian border, starting the battle of Narva. The city was evacuated.

Jüri Uluots, the last legitimate prime minister and the head of the National Committee of the Republic of Estonia, delivered a radio address that implored all able-bodied men born from 1904 through 1923 to report for military service. Prior to this, Uluots had opposed the mobilisation. The call drew support from across the country: 38,000 conscripts jammed registration centers. Two thousand Finland Boys returned.

In 1943 and 1944, two divisions of Waffen SS were formed from Latvians, predominantly conscripts, to fight against the Red Army. The battles of Narva were perceived by Estonian people as the fight for their country, a consolation for the humiliation of 1940. The lengthy German defense on the North Eastern border prevented a swift Soviet breakthrough into Estonia, which gave the underground Estonian National Committee enough time for an attempt to re-establish Estonian independence.

On 1 August 1944, the Estonian National Committee pronounced itself Estonia's highest authority, and on 18 September 1944, acting Head of State Jüri Uluots appointed a new government led by Otto Tief. Over the radio, in English, the Estonian government declared its neutrality in the war. The government issued two editions of the State Gazette. On 21 September, nationalist forces seized the government buildings in Tallinn and ordered the German forces to leave.

The Estonian flag was raised to the permanent flag mast on the tallest tower of Tallinn only to be removed by the Soviets four days later. The Estonian Government in Exile served to carry the continuity of the Estonian state forward until 1992, when Heinrich Mark, the last prime minister in the role of Head of State, handed his credentials over to the incoming President Lennart Meri. The Lithuanian Diplomatic Service continued, based in their pre-war embassies in the U.S. and UK.

The Latvian diplomatic service in exile was the only governmental body of the Republic of Latvia which continued its activities during the Nazi and Soviet occupation of Latvia during 1940–1991. One month before the occupation, on May 17, 1940, the Cabinet of Ministers of Latvia granted extraordinary powers to Kārlis Zariņš, the ambassador of Latvia to the United Kingdom. This authorized Mr. Zariņš to supervise the work of Latvia's representations abroad and handle their finances and property. As a result, Latvian diplomats who were stationed in embassies and consulates at the moment of the occupation in 1940 refused to recognize the occupation and return to Soviet Latvia. They continued to formally represent the interests of Latvia in countries that did not recognize the Soviet annexation. After the restoration of Latvian independence in 1991, the diplomats started reporting to the restored Latvian Ministry of Foreign Affairs.

== Allied powers and the Baltic states ==
=== Western Allies' lack of interest ===
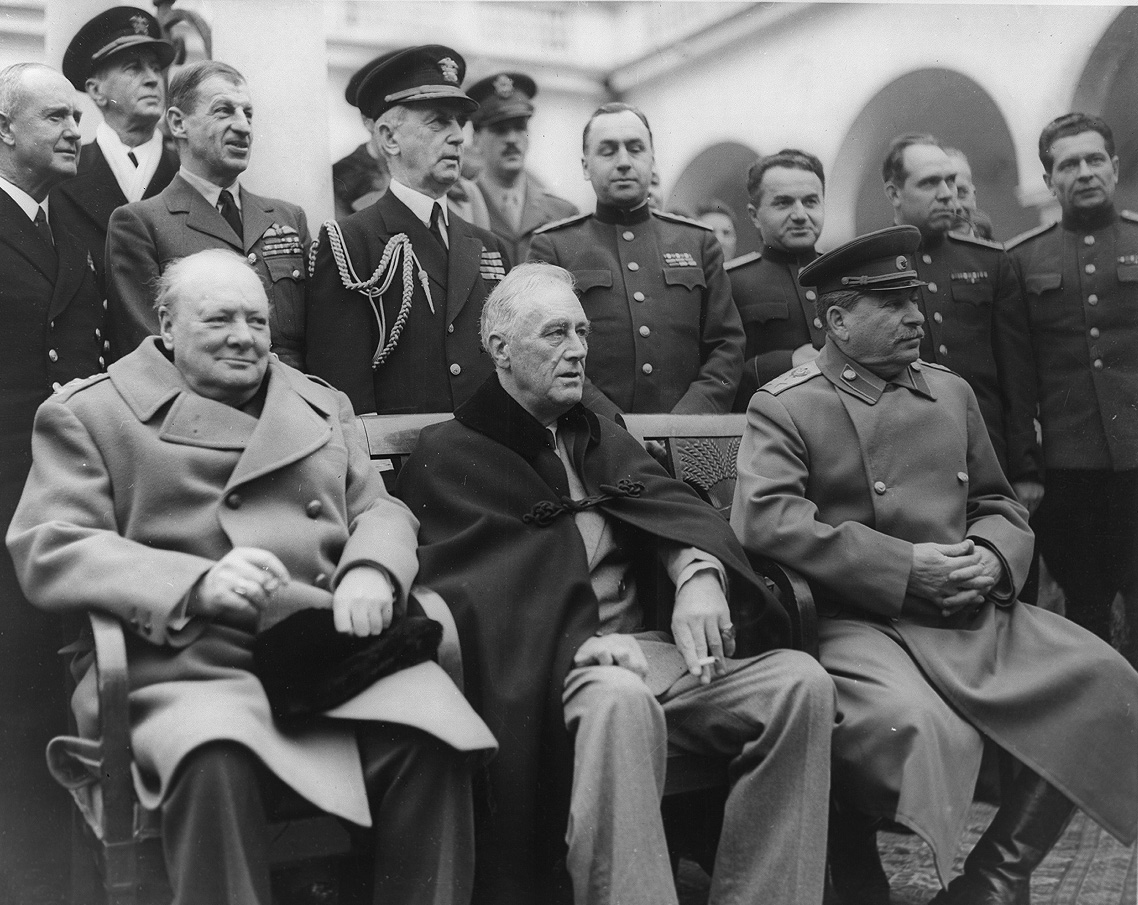
The Yalta Conference in 1945. Seated from left Winston Churchill, Franklin D. Roosevelt and Joseph Stalin.

The Baltic states did not have governments in exile as effective as those of the French under Charles de Gaulle or the Polish under Władysław Sikorski, and their geographic location made communication to the West of circumstances there difficult. The leaders of Great Britain and the United States had little interest in the Baltic cause, particularly while the war against Nazi Germany remained undecided and secretly regarded them as disposable in order to secure Stalin's cooperation. Members of the European Left tended to support the official Soviet view on the Baltic states, regarding them as "naturally" belonging to the Soviet Union to safeguard its "legitimate" security interests.

The Germans' defeat in 1945 left Eastern Europe within the Soviet sphere of influence. However, despite territorial losses and a heavy reparations burden in the Continuation War, Finland survived as a neutral, western-oriented capitalist democracy and did not share the fate of the Baltic states. Despite this apparent freedom, the Finns still had to take into consideration Soviet foreign policy interests including specific accommodations in their domestic affairs, with critics calling the process "Finlandisation".

=== Western Allies acquiesce to Stalin's hold of the Baltics ===
The precedent under international law established by the earlier-adopted Stimson Doctrine, as applied to the Baltic states in the Welles Declaration, issued on 23 July 1940 by US Under Secretary of State Sumner Welles, then acting Secretary of State, and the only public statement of policy by the US, defined the basis for non-recognition by the United States of the Soviet Union's forcible incorporation of the Baltic states.

Despite Welles's statement, the Baltic states soon reprised their centuries-long role as pawns in the conflicts of larger powers. After visiting Moscow in the winter of 1941–1942, British Foreign Minister Eden had already advocated sacrificing the Baltic states to secure Soviet cooperation in the war. The British ambassador to the U.S., Halifax, reported, "Mr. Eden cannot incur the danger of antagonizing Stalin, and the British War Cabinet have... agree[d] to negotiate a treaty with Stalin, which will recognize the 1940 frontiers of the Soviet Union."

In March 1942, Churchill wrote to Roosevelt urging the sacrifice of the Baltic states: "The increasing gravity of the war has led me to feel that the principles of the Atlantic Charter ought not to be construed so as to deny Russia the frontiers she occupied when Germany attacked here. ... I hope therefore that you will be able to give us a free hand to sign the treaty which Stalin desires as soon as possible."

By 1943, Roosevelt had also consigned the Baltic states and Eastern Europe to Stalin. Meeting with his confidante, Archbishop (later, Cardinal) Spellman in New York on 3 September, Roosevelt stated, "The European people will simply have to endure Russian domination, in the hope that in ten or twenty years they will be able to live well with the Russians." Meeting with Stalin in Tehran on 1 December 1943, Roosevelt "said that he fully realized the three Baltic Republics had in history and again more recently been part of Russia and jokingly added, that when the Soviet armies re-occupied these areas, he did not intend to go to war with the Soviet Union on this point." A month later, Roosevelt related to Otto von Habsburg that he had told the Russians they could take over and control Romania, Bulgaria, Bukovina, Eastern Poland, Lithuania, Estonia, Latvia, and Finland.

The future was sealed when on 9 October 1944, Churchill met with Stalin in Moscow and penciled out the post-war partition of Europe. Churchill recounts: "At length I said, 'Might it not be thought rather cynical if it seemed that we had disposed of these issues, so fateful to millions of people, in such an offhand manner? Let us burn the paper.' — 'No, you keep it,' said Stalin." The February 1945 Yalta Conference, widely regarded as determining the future of Europe, invoked the Atlantic Charter and the right of all peoples to choose the form of government under which they will live; however, it did not directly address the issue of the Baltic states, paving the path to unopposed Soviet hegemony over post-war Eastern Europe.

The attitude taken by the Western Allies with regard to the Baltic states following World War II was summarized by Hector McNeil, the Under-Secretary of the Foreign Affairs (1945–1946), before the House of Commons on 10 February 1947. McNeil stated that the British government recognized the absorption of the Baltic states into the Soviet Union de facto but not de jure. He also agreed that the annexation violated the self-determination principle of the Atlantic Charter, but that it should be kept in mind that the Baltic states had been part of the Russian Empire before 1918.

== Withdrawal of the occupational army from the Baltic states ==
On 11 March 1990, the Supreme Council – Reconstituent Seimas adopted Act of the Re-Establishment of the State of Lithuania, however the withdrawal of the Russian Armed Forces from Lithuania began in 1992 and according to an agreement had to be completed until 1 September 1993. Nevertheless, the withdrawal process was not always performed according to the agreed plans and even on 19 August 1993, the Ministry of National Defence of Lithuania had received notice from the Ministry of Defence of Russia that the withdrawal procedure has been stopped because there allegedly was no signed political agreement regarding it. In the morning of 30 August 1993, Lithuanian president Algirdas Brazauskas had a telephone communication with Russian president Boris Yeltsin and urged to withdraw the army on time. Eventually, the last combat unit of the Russian Armed Forces left the Lithuanian territory 15 minutes before the agreed term (on 31 August 1993 23:45), but small Russian military units had remained that also left in the near months. On 26 November 1993, the Lithuanians had taken over the last object from a Russian military unit.
