= National Committee of the Republic of Estonia =

Anti-Soviet and Anti-Nazi organisation in Estonia in 1944

- Eesti Vabariigi Rahvuskomitee
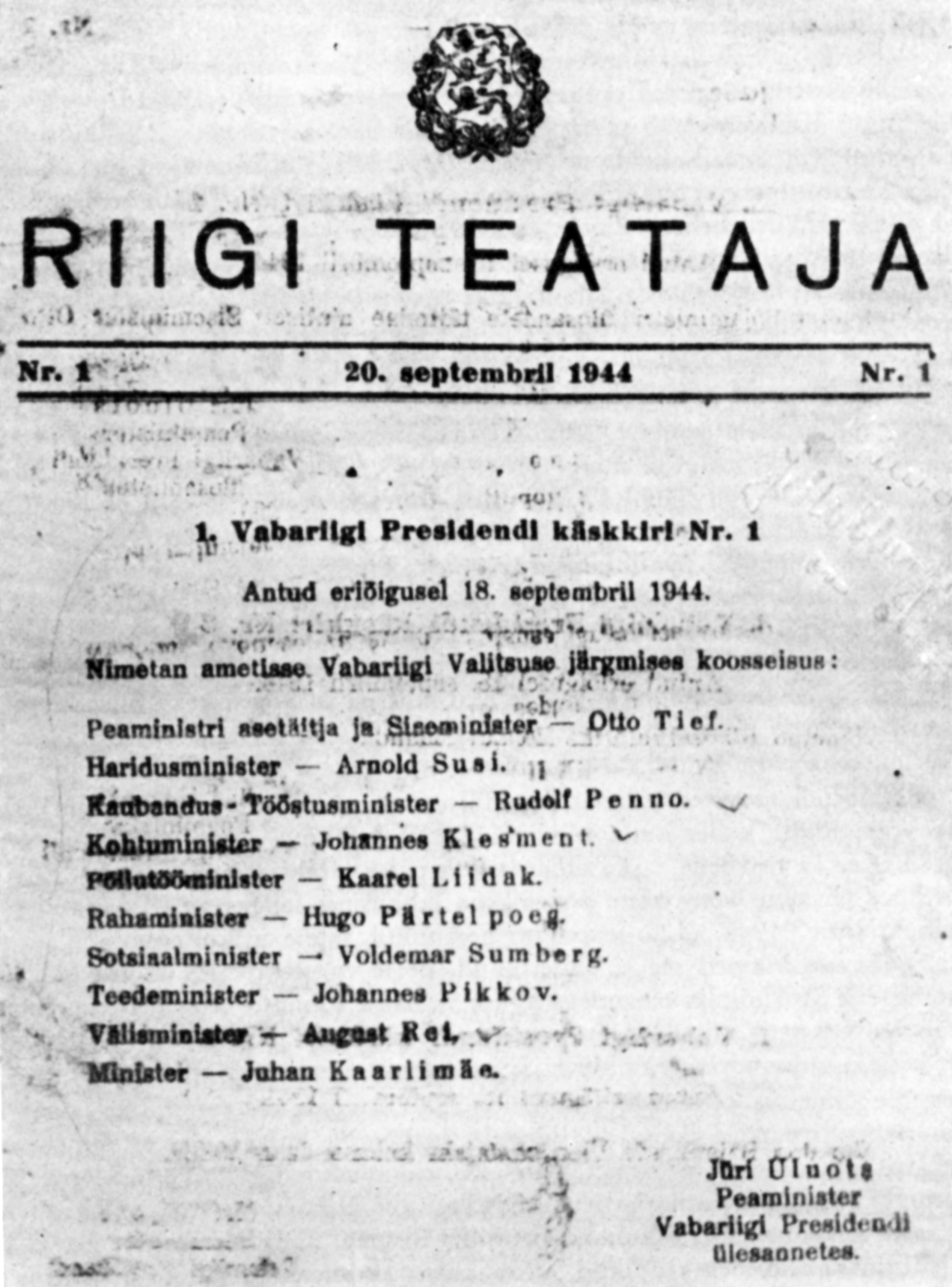
- Estonian Declaration of Independence, published on 18 September 1944
- Abbreviation: EVRK
- Successor: Estonian Government in Exile
- Formation: March 1944
- Dissolved: 1 December 1953; 72 years ago
- Type: Liberation committee/Provisional government
- Purpose: Withdrawal of the Nazi and Soviet occupation regimes; Restoration of the Republic of Estonia
- President: Otto Tief

The National Committee of the Republic of Estonia (Estonian: Eesti Vabariigi Rahvuskomitee, EVRK) was a deliberative and legislative body, formed by Estonian politicians and members of the last government of Republic of Estonia before the Soviet occupation, to control the Anti-Soviet resistance movement in Nazi-occupied Estonia in March 1944. By April 1944 a large number of the committee members were arrested by the German security agencies. On 20 September 1944, the committee proclaimed the Republic of Estonia restored, but two days later, the Soviet Army took control of Tallinn.

== History ==
The original initiative to form the committee came from the Estonian former pre-plebiscite of 1933 opposition parties and it denied the constitutional authority of Jüri Uluots, the last pre-war Prime Minister of the Republic of Estonia. On July 29, 1941, Uluots met with the Nazi military government of Tartu, thanked them for freeing Estonia and asked them to allow him to form the government of independent Estonia with its owned armed forces; however, his request was turned down.

The Committee aimed to establish a provisional government, during the German withdrawal expected as the Red Army had reached the border of Estonia on February 2, 1944. On 1 August 1944, the Committee even declared itself the bearer of the supreme power of State (instead of people).

The Committee succeeded in establishing a communication network with the Estonian diplomats in Finland and Sweden.

In February 1944, the Nazi authorities proclaimed conscription of Estonians; Uluots supported it by saying on the radio broadcast on 7 February that "going along with mobilization is unavoidable at the moment and only by doing so can we expect a better future for Estonia", and approximately 45000 men joined the Nazi formations as a result.

On 20 April 1944, Jüri Uluots convened the Electoral Committee of the Republic of Estonia (Vabariigi Presidendi Asetäitja Valimiskogu, the institution specified in the Constitution for electing the Acting President of the Republic), which held a clandestine meeting in Tallinn. The participants included:

- Jüri Uluots, the last Prime Minister of Estonia before the Soviet occupation, appointed 12 October 1939,
- Johan Holberg, the acting Commander-in-Chief of the Armed Forces, appointed 1 December 1943,
- Otto Pukk, the Chairman of the Chamber of Deputies, elected 17 October 1939,
- Alfred Maurer, the Second deputy Vice-Chairman of the National Council, elected 21 April 1938,
- Mihkel Klaassen, Chairman of the Administrative Department of the State Court of Estonia, appointed 26 September 1938.

The Committee determined that the Soviet-era appointment of Johannes Vares as prime minister by Konstantin Päts had been illegal and that Uluots had assumed the President's duties from 21 June 1940 onwards. On 21 April 1944, Jüri Uluots appointed Alfred Maurer and Otto Tief as deputy prime ministers. On 18 September 1944, Uluots, suffering from cancer, named Otto Tief the acting prime minister and appointed a Government which consisted of 11 members; Jaan Maide was appointed Commander-in-Chief of the Estonian Military. Thus some members of the "national committee" became now members of the constitutional government. On 20 September 1944, Uluots departed for Sweden. Tief assumed office in accordance with the constitution and took the opportunity, with the departure of the Germans, to declare the legitimate Estonian government restored. Most of the members of this government left Tallinn on 21 September and Tief on 22 September. As reported by the Royal Institute of International Affairs at the time, the Estonian national government was proclaimed in Estonia and Estonian military units seized the national government buildings in Toompea Castle and ordered the German forces to leave; according to a later publication, the German forces left voluntarily. The Nazi German flag on Pikk Hermann tower of Toompea was replaced with the flag of Estonia two days later; on the next day, 21 September, the flag of Estonia was raised alongside the Nazi Navy flag in the presence of the Nazi guard of honor; the Nazi flag was bigger than the one of Estonia. Tief’s government, however, failed to stay in power as Estonian military units led by Johan Pitka clashed with both Germans and Soviets. On 22 September, the Soviet Leningrad Front took control of Tallinn. The members of the government who failed to flee the territory controlled by the Soviet Union were captured by NKVD. Maide was executed, while Tief, Arnold Susi, Hugo Pärtelpoeg, Juhan Kaarlimäe, and some others were imprisoned or sent to gulag camps.

After Uluots died on 9 January 1945, in Sweden, August Rei, the most senior surviving member of the government, assumed the role of acting head of state. Rei was supported by the surviving members of the Tief's government in Sweden. Rei was the last Estonian envoy in Moscow before the Soviet annexation and had managed to escape from Moscow to Stockholm through Riga in June 1940.

On 12 January 1953, the Estonian Government in Exile was appointed in Oslo, Norway.

== See also ==
- Supreme Committee for the Liberation of Lithuania
- National Committee for the Liberation of Yugoslavia
- National Committee for a Free Germany
- Committee for the Liberation of the Peoples of Russia
- Japanese People's Emancipation League
- Free Albania National Committee
