= Prime Minister of Estonia =

Head of government

Prime Minister of the Republic of Estonia
- Eesti Vabariigi peaminister
- Coat of arms of Estonia

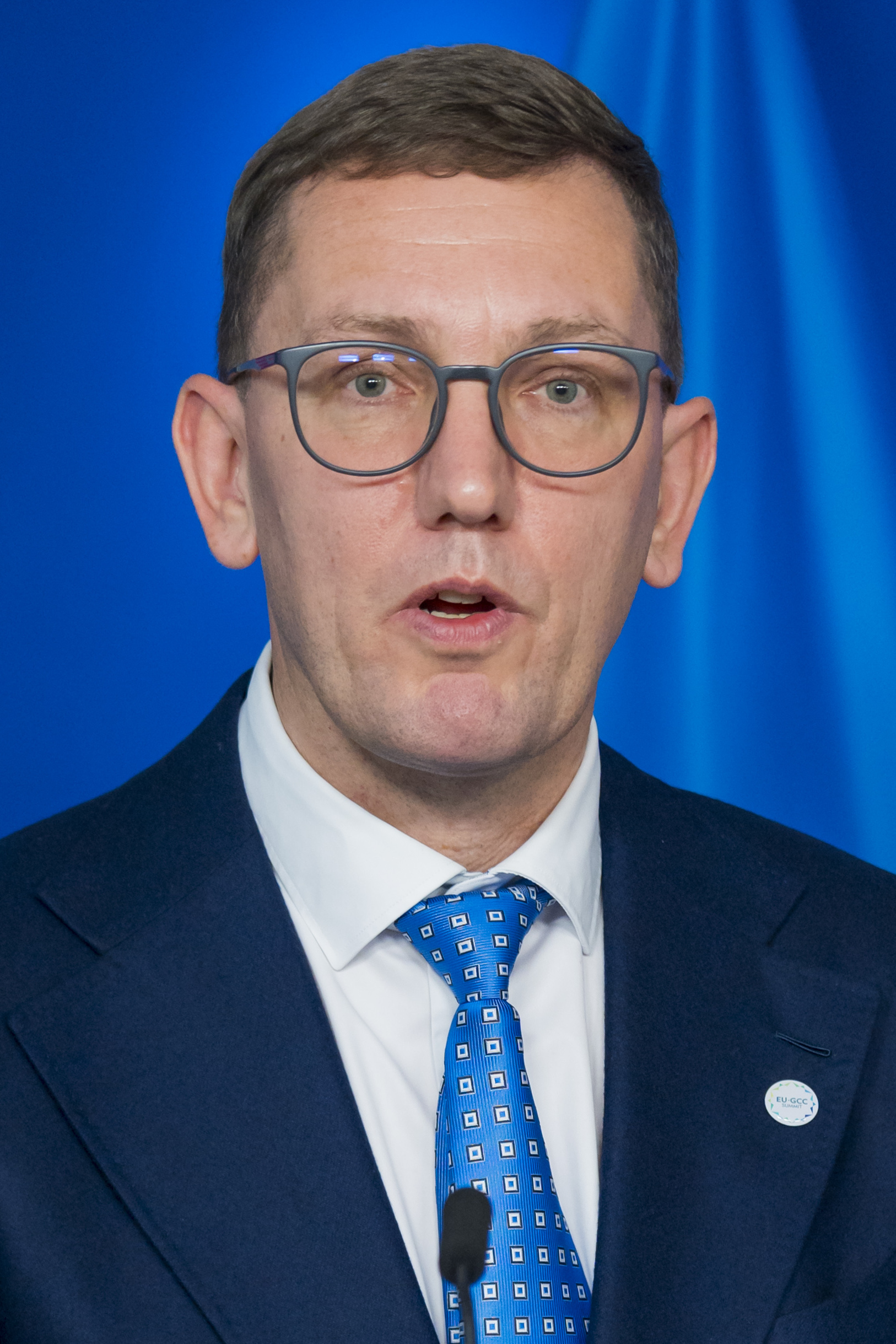
- Incumbent; Kristen Michal since 23 July 2024
- Government of Estonia
- Style: Mister Prime Minister (informal); His Excellency (diplomatic)
- Type: Head of government
- Member of: European Council
- Residence: Stenbock House
- Appointer: President
- Term length: No term limit
- Inaugural holder: Konstantin Päts
- Formation: 24 February 1918; 108 years ago
- Abolished: 1940–1991
- Salary: €7303 monthly
- Website: https://valitsus.ee

The prime minister of Estonia (Estonian: peaminister) is the head of government of the Republic of Estonia. The prime minister is nominated by the president after appropriate consultations with the parliamentary factions and confirmed by the parliament (Riigikogu). In case of disagreement, the parliament can reject the president's nomination and choose their own candidate. In practice, since the prime minister must maintain the confidence of parliament in order to remain in office, they are usually the leader of the senior partner in the governing coalition. The current prime minister is Kristen Michal of the Reform Party. He took the office on 23 July 2024 following the resignation of Kaja Kallas.

The prime minister does not head any specific ministry. Rather, in accordance with the constitution, the prime minister supervises the work of the government. The prime minister's significance and role in the government, and their relations with other ministries, often depend on the position of the party led by the prime minister relative to its coalition partners, and on how much influence the prime minister possesses within one's own party. If the prime minister has a strong position within one's party, and the government is made up solely of representatives of that party, the prime minister can enjoy considerable authority. In all crucial national questions, at least formally, the final word rests with the parliament as the legislative power.

Unlike counterparts in other parliamentary republics, the prime minister of Estonia is both de jure and de facto chief executive. This is because the constitution explicitly vests executive power in the government, of which the prime minister is the leader. In most other parliamentary republics, the president is at least nominal chief executive, while bound by convention to act on the cabinet's advice.

== History ==
After Estonia declared independence from the then warring Russian and German Empires in 1918, the Provisional Government of Estonia was led by a Prime Minister until 1920. The 1920 Constitution set up a head of government whose position called the State Elder (riigivanem) and there was no separate head of state. This system was a radically parliamentary system because the State Elder could be dismissed by the Riigikogu with a simple majority. Moreover, the State Elder was not the Commander-in-Chief of the Armed Forces, nor could they ratify laws or dissolve the Riigikogu. The dissolution of Parliament was only possible through a referendum. Under the 1934 Constitution passed by plebiscite, the position of Prime Minister was recreated as head of government in a more presidential system. Under this constitution, the head of state took the name State Elder (riigivanem) identical to the name for the 1920–1934 head of government. The newly established head of state could appoint and dismiss the Prime Minister and Cabinet, veto laws, give decrees (statutes) and dissolve the Riigikogu. The incumbent Prime Minister in duties of the State Elder of Estonia Konstantin Päts, staged a self-coup to counter the threat of the Vaps Movement and suspended the full implementation of the 1934 Constitution, not going ahead with elections for the new head of state and suspending the parliament. Päts remained the Prime Minister in duties of the State Elder 1934–1937, and as President-regent (riigihoidja) for 1937–1938. According to the 1938 Constitution, the position of the Prime Minister was retained, while the head of state was finally renamed the President under a presidential system. The 1992 Constitution after the Soviet occupation reinstated the 1938–1940 positions of Prime Minister and President under a parliamentary system.

== List ==
=== 1918–1920 ===
Portrait	Name	Term of office			Political party	Cabinet	Riigikogu (Election)	Separate Head of State
Portrait	Name	Took office	Left office	Days	Political party	Cabinet	Riigikogu (Election)	Separate Head of State
The executive order of the Provisional Government and the Council of Elders of the Provincial Assembly replaced the office of Chairman of the Council of Ministers.
—	Konstantin Päts (1874–1956); Chairman of the Council of Ministers of the Provisional Government	24 February 1918	12 November 1918	440	Country People's Union (EMRL)	Päts I Provisional; EMRL–ETE–EDE–ESDTP	Provisional; Provincial; Assembly (1917)	None
—	Prime Minister of the Provisional Government	12 November 1918	27 November 1918	440	Country People's Union (EMRL)	Päts II Provisional; EMRL–ETE–EDE; EMRL–ETE–EDE–ESDTP (Note: The Estonian Social Democratic Workers' Party (ESDTP) joined the coalition on 16 November 1918.)	Provisional; Provincial; Assembly (1917)	None
—	Prime Minister of the Provisional Government	27 November 1918	9 May 1919	440	Country People's Union (EMRL)	Päts III Provisional; EMRL–ETE–EDE–ESDTP; EMRL–ETE–EDE–ESDTP–SEE; EMRL–ETE–EDE–ESDTP–SEE–VKK; EMRL–ETE–ERE–ESDTP–SEE–VKK (Note: The German Party in Estonia (SEE) joined the coalition on 28 November 1918. The Russian Citizens' Assembly (VKK) joined the coalition on 28 February 1919. The Estonian Democratic Party (EDE) merged with the Estonian Radical Democratic Party (ERDE) to form the Estonian People's Party (ERE) on 1 March 1919 and the new party remained in the government.)	Provisional; Provincial; Assembly (1917)	None
1	Otto August Strandman (1875–1941); 1st Prime Minister	9 May 1919	18 November 1919	194	Labour Party (ETE)	Strandman I ETE–ESDTP–ERE; ETE–ESDTP (Note: The Estonian People's Party (ERE) left the coalition on 20 September 1919.)	Constituent; Assembly (1919)	None
2	Jaan Tõnisson (1868–1941?); 2nd Prime Minister	18 November 1919	28 July 1920	254	People's Party (ERE)	Tõnisson I ERE–ETE–ESDTP; ERE–ETE–(ESDTP) (Note: The Estonian Social Democratic Workers' Party (ESDTP) left the coalition on 1 July 1920, but its ministers remained in office.)	Constituent; Assembly (1919)	None
3	Ado Birk (1883–1942); 3rd Prime Minister	28 July 1920	30 July 1920	3	People's Party (ERE)	Birk; ERE–ETE–KRE	Constituent; Assembly (1919)	None
4	Jaan Tõnisson (1868–1941?); 4th Prime Minister (2nd term)	30 July 1920	26 October 1920	89	People's Party (ERE)	Tõnisson II; ERE	Constituent; Assembly (1919)	None
5	Ants Piip (1884–1942); 5th Prime Minister	26 October 1920	20 December 1920	92	Labour Party (ETE)	Piip; ETE	Constituent; Assembly (1919)	None
The 1920 Constitution replaced the office with State Elder.

=== 1934–1937 ===
Portrait	Name	Term of office			Political party	Cabinet	Riigikogu (Election)	Separate Head of State
Portrait	Name	Took office	Left office	Days	Political party	Cabinet	Riigikogu (Election)	Separate Head of State
The 1934 Constitution divided the office of State Elder between a new office called State Elder and a Prime Minister.
6	Konstantin Päts (1874–1956) 6th Prime Minister (in duties of the State Elder)	24 January 1934	3 September 1937	1,319	Farmers' Assemblies (PK) (Note: All political parties were banned on 20 March 1935.)	Päts V non-party coalition (Note: Although Konstantin Päts resigned as President-Regent on 24 April 1938 to become the President on the same day, his cabinet remained temporarily in office until 9 May 1938, headed by acting Prime Minister Kaarel Eenpalu.)	V (1932)	Prime Minister in duties of the State Elder; Konstantin; Päts
6	Konstantin Päts (1874–1956) 6th Prime Minister (in duties of the State Elder)	24 January 1934	3 September 1937	1,319	None (Note: Was member of the Patriotic League which was the only sanctioned political organization, but which cannot be considered a political party per se.)	Päts V non-party coalition	Parliament suspended (Note: The "Era of Silence" began with Konstantin Päts' self-coup on 12 March 1934. The Riigikogu approved of the coup retroactively on 15 March 1934. The Riigikogu was thereafter not convened after 2 October 1934. It was officially disbanded on 1 January 1938.)	Prime Minister in duties of the State Elder; Konstantin; Päts
The Amendment Act of the 1938 Constitution temporarily merged the offices of State Elder and Prime Minister into President-Regent.

=== 1938–1944 ===
Portrait	Name	Term of office			Political party	Cabinet	Riigikogu (Election)	Separate Head of State
Portrait	Name	Took office	Left office	Days	Political party	Cabinet	Riigikogu (Election)	Separate Head of State
The 1938 Constitution divided the office of President-Regent between a President and a Prime Minister.
7	Kaarel Eenpalu (formerly Karl August Einbund) (1888–1942); Acting Prime Minister	24 April 1938	9 May 1938	537	None	Päts V (continued) non-party coalition	Parliament suspended (Note: The "Era of Silence" began with Konstantin Päts' self-coup on 12 March 1934. The Riigikogu approved of the coup retroactively on 15 March 1934. The Riigikogu was thereafter not convened after 2 October 1934. It was officially disbanded on 1 January 1938.)	President; Konstantin; Päts (1938–1940)
7	7th Prime Minister (2nd term)	9 May 1938	12 October 1939	537	None	Eenpalu II non-party coalition (Note: As Karl August Einbund Estonianized his name into Kaarel Eenpalu, his two cabinets are therefore known as Einbund I and Eenpalu II cabinets.)	VI (1938)	President; Konstantin; Päts (1938–1940)
8	Jüri Uluots (1890–1945); 8th Prime Minister	12 October 1939	21 June 1940 (Note: The Soviet Union occupied Estonia on 17 June 1940. The Soviet regime staged a pro-Soviet coup d'état on 21 June 1940, replacing the Jüri Uluots cabinet with that of Johannes Vares. The Republic of Estonia does not consider the Johannes Vares cabinet a legal government of Estonia and considers the Jüri Uluots cabinet to have legally remained in office until 18 September 1944.)	254	None	Uluots non-party coalition	VI (1938)	President; Konstantin; Päts (1938–1940)
1st Soviet Occupation (1940–1941)
German Occupation (1941–1944)
—	Otto Tief (1889–1976); Acting Prime Minister	18 September 1944 (Note: Prime Minister in the duties of the President Jüri Uluots appointed a new government after the departure of German forces, hoping to restore Estonian independence before the arrival of Soviet forces.)	25 September 1944 (Note: The Soviet Union occupied Estonia on 17 June 1940. The Soviet regime staged a pro-Soviet coup d'état on 21 June 1940, replacing the Jüri Uluots cabinet with that of Johannes Vares. The Republic of Estonia does not consider the Johannes Vares cabinet a legal government of Estonia and considers the Jüri Uluots cabinet to have legally remained in office until 18 September 1944.)	8	None	Tief non-party coalition	Parliament disbanded	Prime Minister in duties of the President; Jüri Uluots (Note: The legal Prime Minister Jüri Uluots assumed the role of Prime Minister in the duties of the President on 18 September 1944, after the departure of German forces and before the arrival of Soviet forces.)
2nd Soviet Occupation (See Estonian Government in Exile § List of Acting Prime Ministers)

=== 1990–present ===
Portrait	Name	Term of office			Political party	Cabinet	Riigikogu (Election)	Separate Head of State
Portrait	Name	Took office	Left office	Days	Political party	Cabinet	Riigikogu (Election)	Separate Head of State
2nd Soviet Occupation (See Estonian Government in Exile)
—	Edgar Savisaar (1950–2022); 1st Prime Minister of the Interim Government	3 April 1990 (Note: The Supreme Soviet of the Estonian SSR on 30 March 1990 declared Soviet rule to have been illegal since 1940 and declared a transition period for full independence. Full independence was restored on 20 August 1991.)	29 January 1992	668	Popular Front of Estonia (RR) (Note: The Popular Front of Estonia formed the Estonian People's Centre Party on 12 October 1991.); Estonian People's Centre Party (ERKE)	Savisaar Interim various coalition partners	Supreme; Soviet (1990) (Note: The "Estonian Soviet Socialist Republic" was renamed the "Republic of Estonia" on 8 May 1990 and thus the translation of the Ülemnõukogu was changed from "Supreme Soviet" to "Supreme Council".)	Chairman of the Supreme Soviet
—	Edgar Savisaar (1950–2022); 1st Prime Minister of the Interim Government	3 April 1990	29 January 1992	668	Popular Front of Estonia (RR) Estonian People's Centre Party (ERKE)	Savisaar Interim various coalition partners	Supreme; Soviet (1990)	Chairman of the Supreme Council; Arnold Rüütel
—	Tiit Vähi (born 1947); 2nd Prime Minister of the Interim Government	29 January 1992	21 October 1992	266	None	Vähi Interim various coalition partners	Supreme; Soviet (1990)	Chairman of the Supreme Council; Arnold Rüütel
—	Tiit Vähi (born 1947); 2nd Prime Minister of the Interim Government	29 January 1992	21 October 1992	266	None	Vähi Interim various coalition partners	Supreme; Soviet (1990)	President; Lennart Georg Meri (1992–2001) (Note: President left the party upon assuming office.)
9	Mart Laar (born 1960); 9th Prime Minister	21 October 1992	8 November 1994	749	Pro Patria (I) (Note: The electoral alliance "Pro Patria" formed the Pro Patria National Coalition Party on 21 November 1992.); Pro Patria National Coalition Party (RKEI)	Laar I I–M–ERSP; RKEI–M–ERSP; RKEI–M–ERSP–ELDP; RKEI–M–ERSP–(ELDP); RKEI–M–ERSP–ELDP (Note: The electoral alliance "Moderates" (M) consisted of the Social Democratic Party (ESDP) and the Estonian Rural Centre Party (EMKE).) (Note: The Estonian Liberal Democratic Party (ELDP) joined the coalition on 11 January 1994. Its ministers resigned on 21 June 1994, but the party decided to remain in the coalition and named a minister on 27 June 1994.)	VII (1992)	President; Lennart Georg Meri (1992–2001)
10	Andres Tarand (born 1940); 10th Prime Minister	8 November 1994	17 April 1995	161	Moderates (M)	Tarand; M–RKEI–ERSP–ELDP–VKRE	VII (1992)	President; Lennart Georg Meri (1992–2001)
11	Tiit Vähi (born 1947); 11th Prime Minister (2nd term)	17 April 1995	6 November 1995	701	Coalition Party and Country People's Alliance (KMÜ)	Vähi I KMÜ–KE	VIII (1995)	President; Lennart Georg Meri (1992–2001)
11	Tiit Vähi (born 1947); 11th Prime Minister (2nd term)	6 November 1995	17 March 1997	701	Coalition Party and Country People's Alliance (KMÜ)	Vähi II; KMÜ–REF; KMÜ; KMÜ–AP (Note: The Estonian Reform Party (REF) left the coalition on 1 December 1996. The Progress Party (AP) joined the coalition on 9 December 1996.)	VIII (1995)	President; Lennart Georg Meri (1992–2001)
12	Mart Siimann (born 1946); 12th Prime Minister	17 March 1997	25 March 1999	739	Coalition Party and Country People's Alliance (KMÜ)	Siimann; KMÜ–AP	VIII (1995)	President; Lennart Georg Meri (1992–2001)
13	Mart Laar (born 1960); 13th Prime Minister (2nd term)	25 March 1999	28 January 2002	1,041	Pro Patria Union (IL)	Laar II; IL–M–REF	IX (1999)	President; Lennart Georg Meri (1992–2001)
13	Mart Laar (born 1960); 13th Prime Minister (2nd term)	25 March 1999	28 January 2002	1,041	Pro Patria Union (IL)	Laar II; IL–M–REF	IX (1999)	President; Arnold Rüütel (2001–2006)
14	Siim Kallas (1948–2026); 14th Prime Minister	28 January 2002	10 April 2003	438	Reform Party (REF)	S. Kallas; REF–KE	IX (1999)	President; Arnold Rüütel (2001–2006)
15	Juhan Parts (born 1966); 15th Prime Minister	10 April 2003	12 April 2005	735	Res Publica Party (RES)	Parts; RES–REF–RL	X (2003)	President; Arnold Rüütel (2001–2006)
16	Andrus Ansip (born 1956); 16th Prime Minister	12 April 2005	5 April 2007	3,271	Reform Party (REF)	Ansip I REF–KE–RL	X (2003)	President; Arnold Rüütel (2001–2006)
16	Andrus Ansip (born 1956); 16th Prime Minister	12 April 2005	5 April 2007	3,271	Reform Party (REF)	Ansip I REF–KE–RL	X (2003)	President; Toomas Hendrik Ilves (2006–2016)
16	Andrus Ansip (born 1956); 16th Prime Minister	5 April 2007	6 April 2011	3,271	Reform Party (REF)	Ansip II; REF–IRL–SDE; REF–IRL (Note: The Social Democratic Party (SDE) left the coalition on 21 May 2009.)	XI (2007)	President; Toomas Hendrik Ilves (2006–2016)
16	Andrus Ansip (born 1956); 16th Prime Minister	6 April 2011	26 March 2014	3,271	Reform Party (REF)	Ansip III; REF–IRL	XII (2011)	President; Toomas Hendrik Ilves (2006–2016)
17	Taavi Rõivas (born 1979); 17th Prime Minister	26 March 2014	9 April 2015	973	Reform Party (REF)	Rõivas I REF–SDE	XII (2011)	President; Toomas Hendrik Ilves (2006–2016)
17	Taavi Rõivas (born 1979); 17th Prime Minister	9 April 2015	23 November 2016	973	Reform Party (REF)	Rõivas II; REF–SDE–IRL	XIII (2015)	President; Toomas Hendrik Ilves (2006–2016)
17	Taavi Rõivas (born 1979); 17th Prime Minister	9 April 2015	23 November 2016	973	Reform Party (REF)	Rõivas II; REF–SDE–IRL	XIII (2015)	President; Kersti Kaljulaid (2016–2021)
18	Jüri Ratas (born 1978); 18th Prime Minister	23 November 2016	29 April 2019	1525	Centre Party (KE)	Ratas I KE–SDE–IRL; KE–SDE–I (Note: The Union of Pro Patria and Res Publica was renamed Party Pro Patria on 2 June 2018.)	XIII (2015)	President; Kersti Kaljulaid (2016–2021)
18	Jüri Ratas (born 1978); 18th Prime Minister	29 April 2019	26 January 2021	1525	Centre Party (KE)	Ratas II; KE–EKRE–I	XIV (2019)	President; Kersti Kaljulaid (2016–2021)
19	Kaja Kallas (born 1977); 19th Prime Minister	26 January 2021	14 July 2022	1274	Reform Party (REF)	K. Kallas I REF–KE; REF (Note: The Centre Party left the coalition on 3 June 2022.)	XIV (2019)	President; Kersti Kaljulaid (2016–2021)
19	Kaja Kallas (born 1977); 19th Prime Minister	26 January 2021	14 July 2022	1274	Reform Party (REF)	K. Kallas I REF–KE; REF	XIV (2019)	President; Alar Karis (2021–2026)
19	Kaja Kallas (born 1977); 19th Prime Minister	18 July 2022	17 April 2023	1274	Reform Party (REF)	K. Kallas II; REF–SDE–I	XIV (2019)	President; Alar Karis (2021–2026)
19	Kaja Kallas (born 1977); 19th Prime Minister	17 April 2023	23 July 2024	1274	Reform Party (REF)	K. Kallas III; REF–E200–SDE	XV (2023)	President; Alar Karis (2021–2026)
20	Kristen Michal (born 1975); 20th Prime Minister	23 July 2024	Incumbent	812	Reform Party (REF)	Michal; REF–E200–SDE REF–E200 (Note: The Social Democratic Party (SDE) were expelled from the coalition on 11 March 2025.)	XV (2023)	President; Alar Karis (2021–2026)

== See also ==
- List of heads of government of Estonia
  - List of heads of government-in-exile
- President of Estonia
