= Helmut Maandi =

Estonian statesman

Helmut Maandi (5 June 1906 in Sikeldi (now Rapla Parish), Kreis Harrien, Governorate of Estonia – 27 October 1990) was an Estonian statesman. He was chairman of the Chamber of Agricultural Workmen and Small Landowners and served as Secretary of State of Estonia from 1944 to 1945 and from 1949 to 1953, although in exile in Sweden.

Political offices
| Preceded by Karl Terras | State Secretary of Estonia (in exile); 1944–1945 | Succeeded by Artur Mägi |
| Preceded by Artur Mägi | State Secretary of Estonia (in exile); 1949–1953 | Succeeded by Heinrich Mark |
