= Johannes Sikkar =

Estonian politician (1897–1960)

Johannes Sikkar (October 15, 1897 – August 22, 1960) was the first head of the Estonian government in exile as Acting Prime Minister (January 12, 1953 – August 22, 1960).

== Biography ==
Sikkar was born in Kõnnu, Tartu County. Sikkar served in the Estonian War of Independence against post-revolutionary Soviet Russia on armoured train as a voluntary and an officer, he was granted a farm, which he held until 1944. He finished economic faculty of Tartu University cum laude in 1936. In 1920 he married Hilda Vilhelmine Truus (1900–1995) and had a son and a daughter.

He was member of National Assembly from June 15, 1926, to December 31, 1937.

In 1940 and 1944 he participated in resistance against Soviet and German occupations and escaped to Sweden September 12, 1944.

There he was appointed and adjured minister by August Rei, 3rd Pater Estoniae on April 20, 1952, and Acting Prime Minister, as head of government in exile, and Minister of Interior on January 12, 1953. Because such political activities were then prohibited for Estonian exiles in Sweden, members of his government assumed their offices in Oslo, Norway.

He died in Stockholm, Sweden.

== Johannes Sikkar's government ==
- Johannes Sikkar (died August 22, 1960) – Acting Prime Minister and Minister of Interior
- Aleksander Warma – Minister of Foreign Affairs
- Tõnis Kint (from January 14, 1953) – Minister of Agriculture, from August 22, 1960, also Acting Prime Minister
- Mihkel Truusööt (January 14, 1953 – September 10, 1956) – Minister of Economic Affairs
- Aksel Mark (from September 21, 1956) – Minister
- Arvo Horm (from September 21, 1956) – Minister
- Oskar Lõvi (from May 25, 1957) – Minister of Economic Affairs
- Peeter Panksep (from May 25, 1957) – Minister

== Sources ==
- Johannes Sikkar, Mihkel Truusööt, Tõnis Kint and Aleksander Warma were appointed on January 12, 1953. Dates given above are these, when they assumed their offices.
- Gustav Suits, who was appointed Minister of Public Education, assumed not this office and died on May 23, 1956.
- Oskar Lõvi, Peeter Panksep, Aksel Mark and Arvo Horm were appointed on September 10, 1956.
- Eduard Leetmaa was appointed Minister on January 31, 1959, but he assumed not this office.

Preceded by Otto Tief	Prime Minister of Estonia in exile 1953–1960	Succeeded by Aleksander Warma
Preceded by Otto Tief	Estonian Minister of Interior in Exile; 1953–1960	Succeeded by Aksel Mark
