= Barbarus (disambiguation) =

Barbarus is the Latin for barbarian.

Barbarus may also refer to:

- Barbarus (comics), fictional character in the Marvel Comics universe
- Ermolao Barbaro (1453/1454–1493), Italian Renaissance scholar
- Johannes Vares (1890–1946), Estonian poet, doctor, and politician; known as Johannes Vares Barbarus
