= Kõnnu, Tartu County =

Village in Estonia

- Village
- Location within Estonia
- Coordinates: 58.275°N 27.208333333333°E
- Country: Estonia
- County: Tartu County
- Parish: Kastre Parish
- Time zone: UTC+2 (EET)
  - Summer (DST): UTC+3 (EEST)

Kõnnu is a village in Kastre Parish, Tartu County in Estonia.

== Notable people ==
- Johannes Sikkar, Acting Prime Minister of the Estonian government in exile 1953–1961, was born in Kõnnu.
