= Katrin Nyman-Metcalf =

Estonian-Swedish legal scholar

Katrin Nyman-Metcalf (born 7 May 1963) is an Estonian-Swedish legal scholar. From 1990 to 1992 she was the State Secretary of Estonia of the Estonian government-in-exile. She was born in Stockholm to Estonian-Swedish engineer Einar Nyman and Estonian textbook author and drawing teacher Edith Kotka-Nyman. In 1987, she graduated from Uppsala University's Faculty of Law. She defended her doctoral thesis in 1999 also in Uppsala. She was the State Secretary of the Estonian government-in-exile from 1990 to 1992.

Since 2010, she teaches at Tallinn University of Technology.
