= State Secretary of Estonia =

Head of the Government Office of Estonia

State Secretary or Secretary of State (Estonian: riigisekretär) is a higher official, who leads Estonian Riigikantselei. Since 2018, State Secretary is Taimar Peterkop.

== State Secretaries ==
Years	State Secretary
1921–1940	Karl Terras
1944–1945	Helmut Maandi (in exile)
1945–1949	Artur Mägi (in exile)
1949–1953	Helmut Maandi (in exile)
1953–1971	Heinrich Mark (in exile)
1971–1990	Arved Ruusa (in exile)
1990–1992	Katrin Nyman-Metcalf (in exile)
1992–1995	Ülo Kaevats
1995–1999	Uno Veering
1999–2003	Aino Lepik von Wirén
2003–2018	Heiki Loot
2018–2025	Taimar Peterkop
2025–	Keit Kasemets
