= Riigikantselei =

Governmental authority in Estonia

Logo of Riigikantselei

Riigikantselei (English: Government Office) is an executive office of Republic of Estonia. The office's purpose is to support the Republic's executive branch in enacting the political decisions. It is also known for its responsibility to publish Riigi Teataja and its electronic counterpart, Elektrooniline Riigi Teataja.

The leader of Riigikantselei is State Secretary of Estonia.
