= Elektrooniline Riigi Teataja =

Database of the laws of Estonia

Elektrooniline Riigi Teataja (commonly abbreviated eRT) is the web-based outlet for publication of laws and official announcements of the Republic of Estonia. It is modelled after the older paper-based publication, Riigi Teataja. Under Estonian law, Elektrooniline Riigi Teataja is since 1 June 2002 considered the authoritative reference source for laws of Estonia. Just like Riigi Teataja, eRT is published by Riigikantselei.

Since 1 January 2006, eRT was the only form of official publication for most Estonian laws, and paper-based Riigi Teataja issues were only printed occasionally, for checking purposes. The last issue of the paper version of Riigi Teataja was published on May 31, 2010.

== Legal effects ==
Unless otherwise specified by Riigikogu, Estonian laws are enacted 10 days after official publication. Although other methods are still possible, official publication is nowadays almost always done through the eRT.

== Predecessors ==
Introduction of Elektrooniline Riigi Teataja made obsolete several earlier electronic databases of Estonian laws, most notably, the privately maintained Estlex system.

== Background ==
Estonia is one of the first countries in the world to have an official electronic publication for legal texts. Most member countries of European Union now publish their laws electronically, but usually still without full legal force. Furthermore, most other countries that do publish their laws in electronic form, do it only after the enactment of these laws.

== Security ==
The information security aspect of primary interest for an official publication of laws is integrity. In order to ascertain integrity, eRT uses SSL cryptography for all legally binding content it serves.

== Statistics ==
As of 2007, Elektrooniline Riigi Teataja gets about 500,000 pageviews per day.
