= Aleksander Warma =

Estonian politician

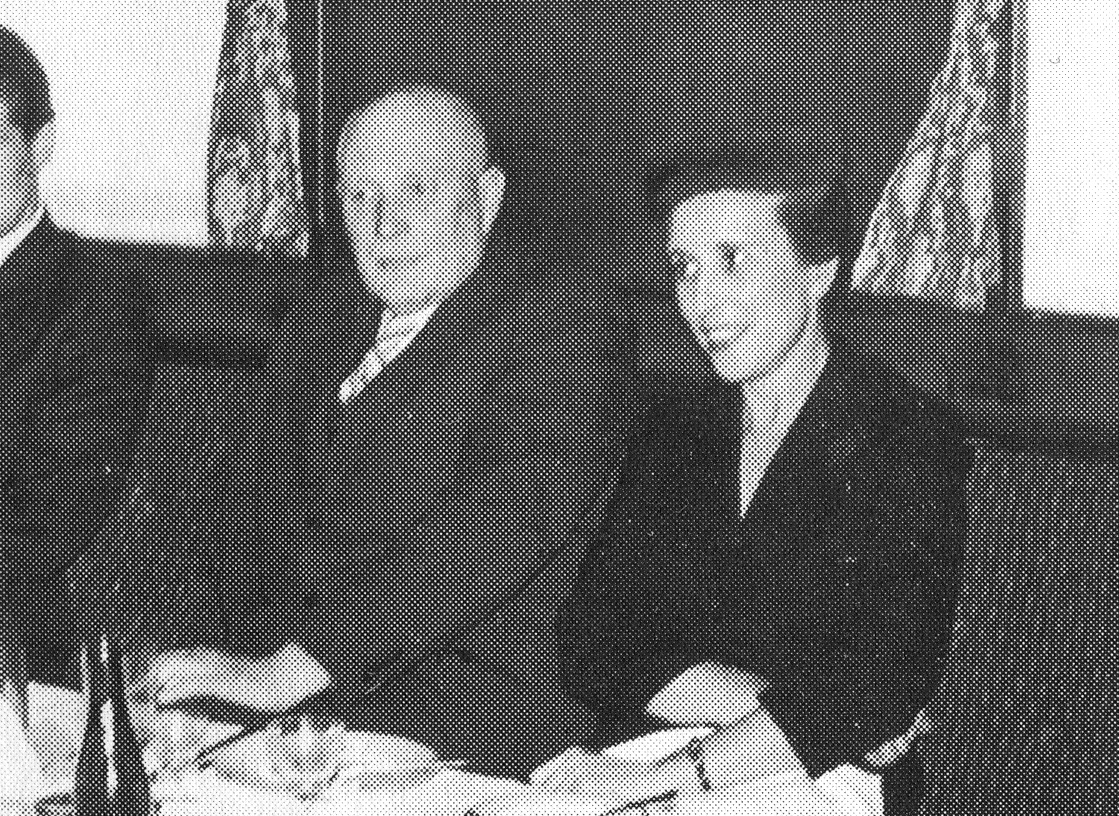
- Aleksander Warma (left) with his wife in the 1950s or early 1960s

Prime Minister in duties of the President
- In office March 29, 1963 – December 23, 1970
- Preceded by: August Rei
- Succeeded by: Tõnis Kint

Acting Prime Minister of Estonian Exile Government
- In office January 1, 1962 – March 29, 1963

Minister of foreign Affairs of Estonian Exile Government
- In office 1953–1962

Minister of Justice (acting) of Estonian Exile Government
- In office 1953–1962

Personal details
- Born: June 22, 1890 Viinistu, Kreis Harrien, Governorate of Estonia, Russian Empire
- Died: December 23, 1970 (aged 80) Stockholm, Sweden
- Spouse(s): 1918–1927 Anni Pulk, since 1931 Marta Alep
- Education: Tallinn Teachers' Seminar; University of Tartu

Aleksander Warma VR I/3 (also Varma; 22 June [O.S. 10 June] 1890 – 23 December 1970) was an Estonian navy officer, diplomat, and painter.

== Biography ==
Aleksander Warma studied at marine schools in Käsmu and Narva, and he took a deep sea captain's exam in Riga. In 1920, he took the high school exams for the examination committee of the Tallinn Teachers' Training College. From 1920 to 1924, he studied at the Department of Law of Tartu University, graduating with a 1st-degree diploma. He received a master's degree in law in 1928. He was a member of the Estonian Students' Society.

In World War I, he served in the Russian Baltic fleet. During the Estonian War of Independence, he served in the Estonian Navy, and he was chief of staff of the navy from 1919 to 1920. After the war, he commanded the navy ship Mardus. From 1924 to 1926, he was assistant to the jurisconsult of the Ministry of War. In 1926, Warma retired as a lieutenant commander.

From 1926 to 1927, Warma was the director of the legal bureau of the Ministry of Foreign Affairs, from 1927 to 1931 the director of the Administrative Department of Foreign Affairs, from 1931 to 1933 the counsellor of the Estonian Legation in Moscow, from 1933 to 1938 the consul-general in Leningrad (today St. Petersburg), from 1938 to 1939 the Estonian envoy to Lithuania, and from 1939 to 1944 to the Estonian envoy to Finland. After the war, Warma served in the Estonian government-in-exile, in which he was the minister of foreign affairs and the acting minister of justice from 1953 to 1962, and acting prime minister in duties of the minister of foreign affairs from 1962 to 1963. Warma served as prime minister in duties of the President of the Republic of Estonia from March 29, 1963, to December 23, 1970.

In 1964 he also became the Estonian diplomatic representative in Paris.

== See also ==
- Estonian War of Independence

== Sources ==
- Aleksander Warma
- Ülo Kaevats et al. 2000. Eesti Entsüklopeedia 14. Tallinn: Eesti Entsüklopeediakirjastus, ISBN 978-9985-70-064-8

Political offices
| Preceded by Hans Rebane | Estonian Minister of Foreign Affairs in exile 1953–1964 | Succeeded by August Koern |
| Preceded by Johannes Sikkar | Prime Minister of Estonia in exile 1962–1964 | Succeeded by Tõnis Kint |
| Preceded by August Rei | Prime Minister in duties of the President; 1963–1970 | Succeeded by Tõnis Kint |
