= Otto Tief =

Estonian politician and lawyer (1889–1976)

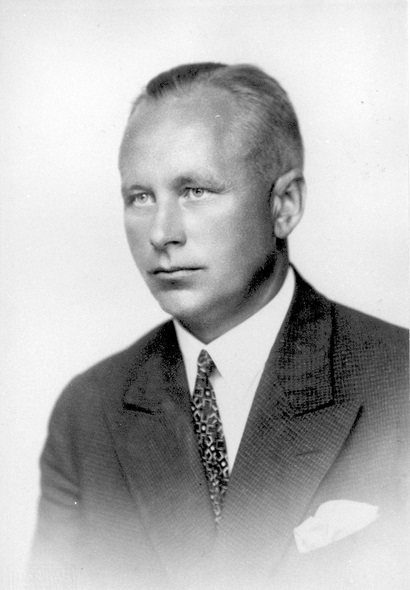
- Tief, c. 1930
- Born: 14 August 1889; Uusküla, Governorate of Estonia, Russian Empire
- Died: 5 March 1976 (aged 86); Ahja, then part of Estonian SSR, Soviet Union
- Occupations: Lawyer; Prime Minister

Otto Tief (14 August [O.S. 2 August] 1889 – 5 March 1976) was an Estonian politician, military commander, and a lawyer.

Tief was the acting prime minister of the last government of Estonia before Soviet troops occupied Estonia in the Second World War in September 1944. Due to his commitment to his country, Tief is regarded by many of his fellow countrymen as a symbol of national resistance.

== Education and career ==
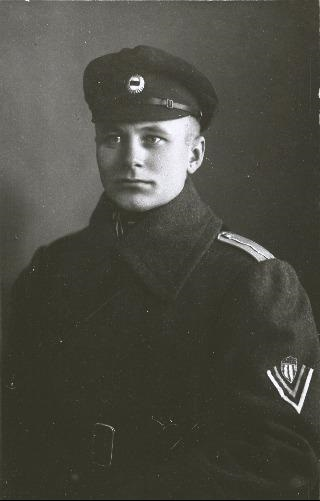
Lieutenant Otto Tief in the Estonian Army during the Estonian War of Independence, 1919

Tief studied law in St Petersburg between 1910 and 1916. During the Estonian War of Independence, Tief was a commander in the Kalevlaste Maleva battalion formed in 1918 by members of the Kalev sports society. Following the war, he graduated in law from the University of Tartu in 1921. He served as legal counsel to Eesti Maapank (the Estonian Land-Bank) and also worked in private practice as a lawyer. Tief was elected to parliament (third Riigikogu) in 1926 and served as the Minister of Social Affairs from 1926 to 1927. In 1928 he was the Minister of Justice. In 1932 he was elected to the fifth Riigikogu.

== Tief government of 1944 ==
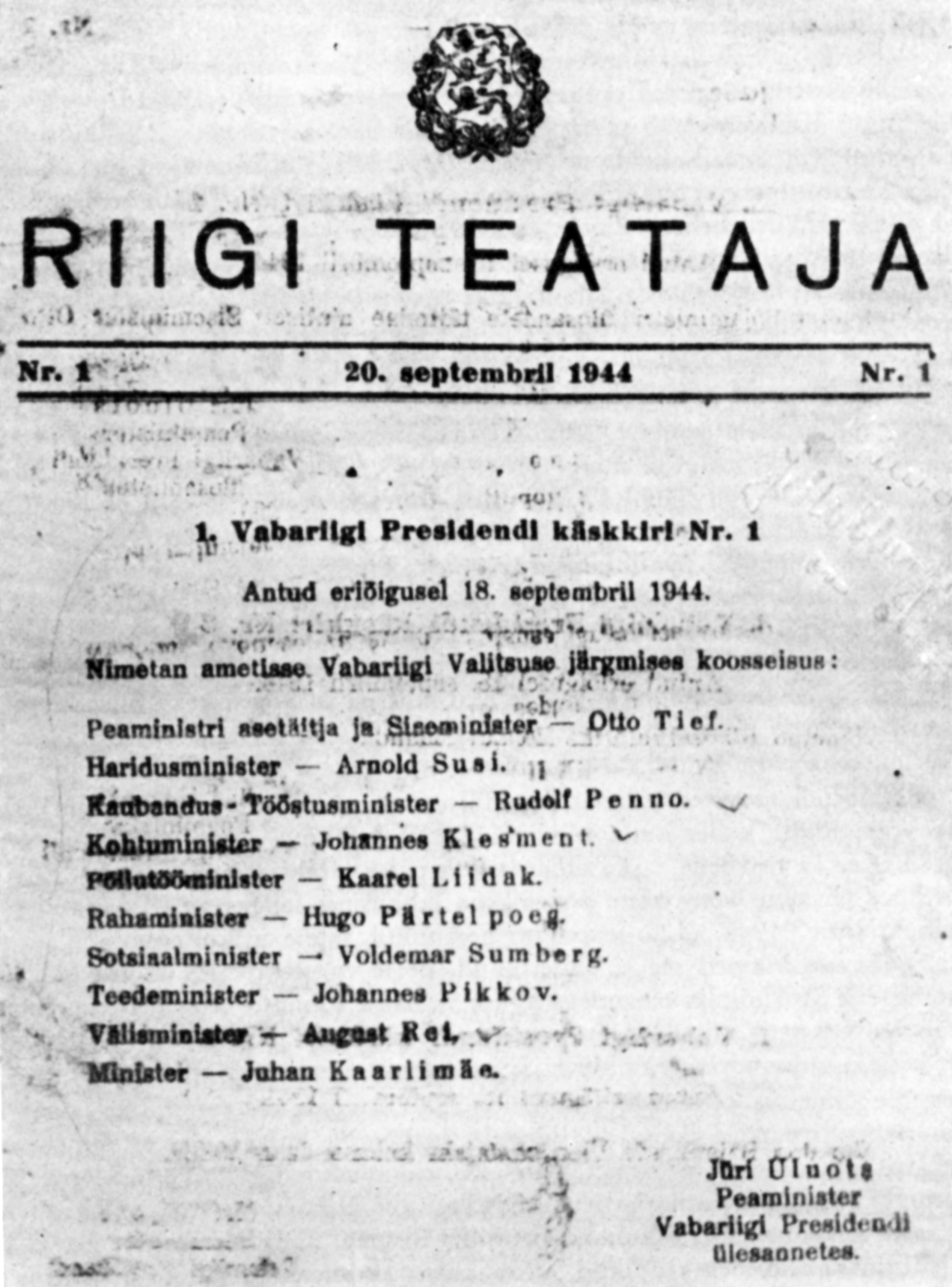
The 18 September 1944 appointed Government of Estonia in Riigi Teataja

During the turbulent days in September 1944, between the retreat of the German occupation forces in Estonia and the advancement of the Red Army, the acting President of the Republic of Estonia Jüri Uluots appointed Tief Prime Minister and asked him to form a government on 18 September 1944. Tief then published a proclamation, re-establishing the independence of the Republic of Estonia on the basis of legal continuity, and attempted to organise the defence of Tallinn against the invading Red Army, which pushed into the capital on 22 September 1944.

Members of the Tief's government:

- Otto Tief – Acting Prime Minister and Minister of Interior
- Arnold Susi – Minister of Public Education
- Johannes Klesment (escaped to Sweden, assumed office 13 January 1945) – Minister of Justice
- Kaarel Liidak (died 16 January 1945) – Minister of Agriculture
- Hugo Pärtelpoeg (died 29 April 1951) – Minister of Finance
- Voldemar Sumberg – Minister of Social Affairs
- Juhan Pikkov (died 3 September 1947) – Minister of Communications
- August Rei (in Sweden, assumed office 31 December 1944, until 9 January 1945) – Minister of Foreign Affairs
- Juhan Kaarlimäe – Minister
- Johannes Sikkar (in Sweden, from 20 April 1952) – Minister
- Artur Terras (in Sweden, from 20 April 1952) – Minister

== Aftermath ==
Otto Tief was arrested by the Soviet NKVD on 10 October 1944. In 1945, the Soviet occupation authorities sentenced him to ten years of imprisonment in the Siberian Gulag. While in imprisonment, in January 1953, he was removed in absentia from the Estonian government-in-exile by August Rei. After being able to return briefly to Soviet-occupied Estonia in 1955, Tief was again forced to live in exile in Soviet Ukraine until 1965, when he was permitted to relocate closer to home, and he could then reside just on the other side of the Estonian border in Latvia. When Tief died on 5 March 1976, the Soviet security services would not allow his burial in Estonia. After Estonia regained independence in 1991, Tief was reinterred and reburied in his home country, in the national cemetery in Tallinn, in 1993.

== Tief's symbolic significance ==
Tief held power for only a brief period of time (18–22 September 1944), and his efforts were rapidly undone by the invading Red Army. However, Tief's actions have immense symbolic and legal significance, as his proclaiming of the restoration of the Republic of Estonia, as well as the accompanying raising of the Estonian flag atop the tower of Pikk Hermann high above Tallinn at the seat of power in the Toompea quarter negates Soviet historiography's claims, according to which the invasion of Estonia by the Soviet Red Army in September 1944 constituted "the liberation of Estonia". Although the attempt to restore Estonian independence in September 1944 did not succeed, the Tief government proved to be an integral and indispensable part of the de jure continuity of the Republic of Estonia.

== Commemoration ==
In February 2007 the Estonian parliament decided to commemorate the actions of Tief's government by proclaiming 22 September the annual "Day of Resistance". 22 September 1944 was the day, several days after the departure of Nazi Germany's occupying forces, that Stalin´s invading Red Army took over the administrative centre of Tallinn, tore down the Estonian national flag, and replaced it with the Red Banner, the symbol of Soviet occupation.
