= Malevlane =

Estonian newspaper

- Editor-in-chief: Eino Parikka
- Founded: 1943
- Ceased publication: 1944
- Language: Estonian
- City: Helsinki
- Country: Finland

Malevlane (The Warrior) was an Estonian-language newspaper published in Helsinki, Finland, from 1943 to 1944.

Malevlane began publication in Helsinki on December 9, 1943. The editor-in-chief and editor-in-chief was Eino Parikka. The editorial board included Heinrich Mark, Arvo Horm, Voldemar Kures, and later Valev Uibopuu.

Malevlane published information from Estonia and gave reports from the front. The last issue (no. 33) was published on September 16, 1944.
