= Uno Veering =

Estonian lawyer (born 1949)

Uno Veering (born 27 October 1949 in Harju County) is an Estonian lawyer.

In 1992, he was Minister of State Affairs (Estonian: riigiminister).

1995–1999, he was State Secretary of Estonia.
