= Valev Uibopuu =

Estonian writer (1913–1997)

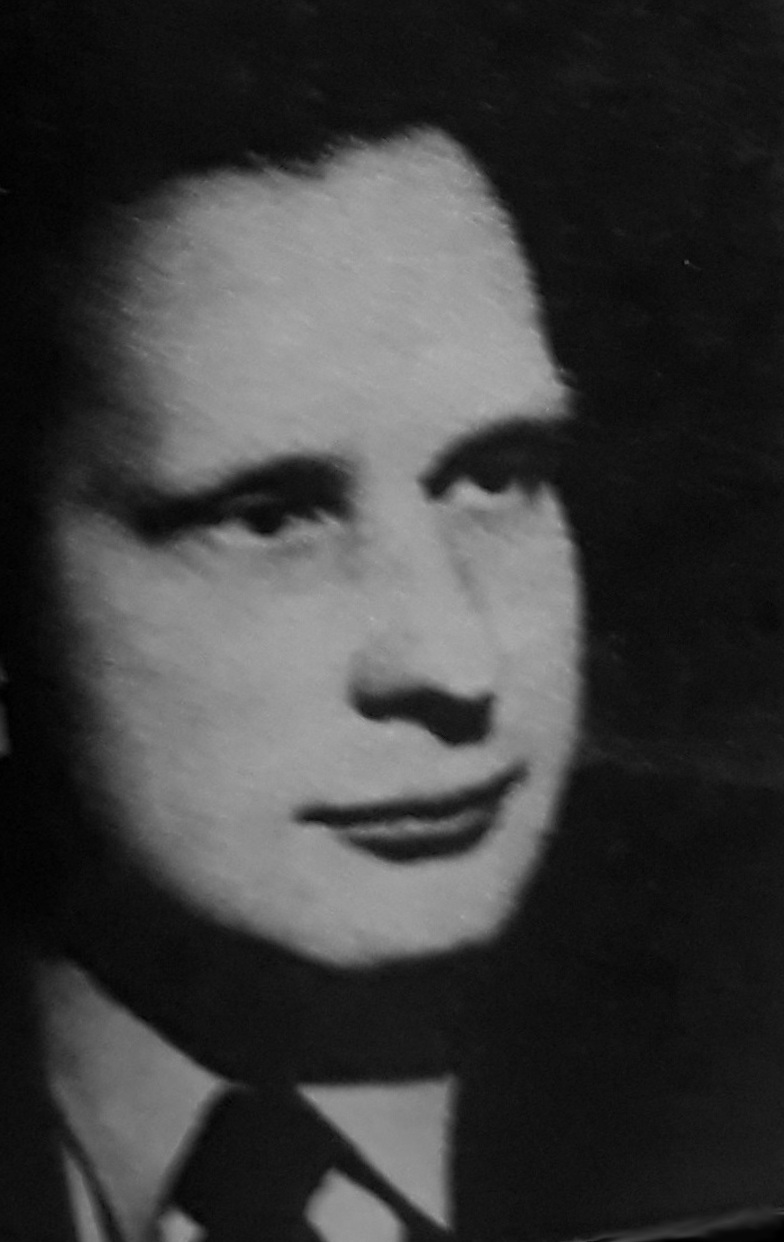
- Uibopuu in 1961
- Born: 19 October 1913 Vana-Antsla Parish, Kreis Werro, Governorate of Livonia
- Died: 18 March 1997 (aged 83) Lund, Sweden

Valev Uibopuu (19 October 1913 Vana-Antsla Parish (now Antsla Parish), Kreis Werro – 18 March 1997 Lund) was an Estonian writer. He is one of the most known Estonian expatriate writers.

In 1943, he fled to Finland, where he was involved with the Estonian-language newspaper Malevlane, and in 1944 he relocated to Sweden, where he was involved with another Estonian newspaper.

From 1954 to 1970, he worked for Estonian Writers' Cooperative publishing house and was also its chairman. From 1970 to 1980, he taught at Lund University and at the same time he was the director of the university's Finno-Ugric Institute.

He died in 1997 in Lund, but he is buried at Lüllemäe Cemetery in Karula.

== Works ==
- novel "Võõras kodu" (Vadstena 1945)
- novel "Keegi ei kuule meid" (Vadstena 1948)
- novel "Neli tuld" (Lund 1951)
- novel "Janu" (Lund 1957)
- novel "Markuse muutumised" (Lund 1961)
- novel "Lademed" (Lund 1970)
- novel "Kaks inimelu ajapöördeis" (double novel): "Mina ja tema" (Lund 1990) and "Ainult juhus" (Lund 1991)
