= Enno Penno =

Estonian politician (1930–2016)

Enno Penno (22 April 1930 in Tallinn – 16 November 2016 in Stockholm) was an Estonian politician, who was acting as Acting Prime Minister of Estonia in exile from 1 March 1990 to 20 June 1992.

== See also ==
- Heinrich Mark
