= Aino Lepik von Wirén =

Estonian diplomat

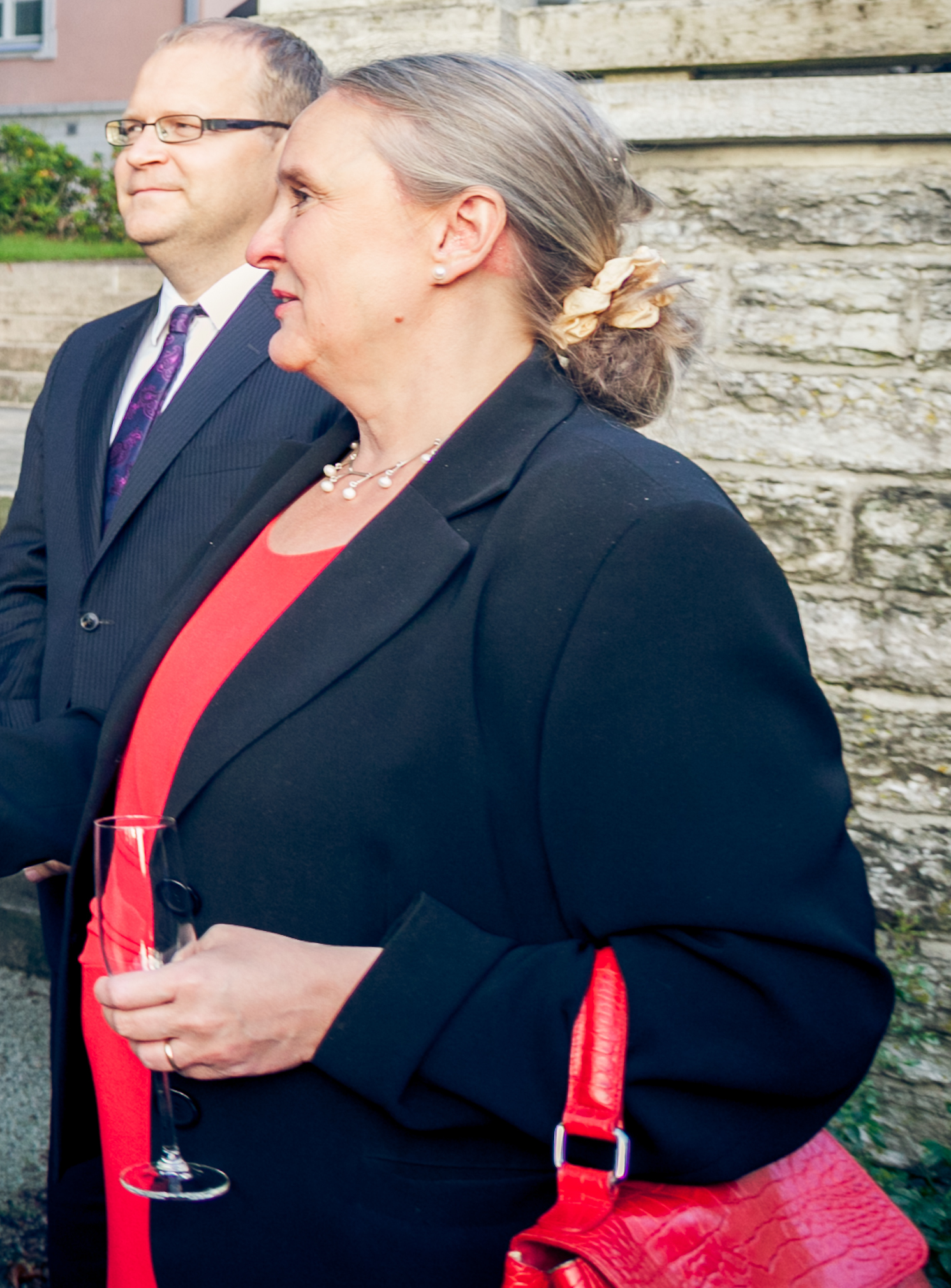
Aino Lepik von Wirén

Aino Lepik von Wirén (born 28 October 1961 in Stockholm) is an Estonian diplomat.

== Early life and education ==
Aino Lepik von Wirén was born in Stockholm, Sweden in 1961 to poet Kalju Lepik and Asta Lepik. She studied law at University of Surrey graduating in 1985 and undertook further study in law at Stockholm University in 1987.

== Career ==
From 1987 to 1990 she worked as a lawyer at Örebro Administrative Court, Sweden, moving on to be a prosecutor at Stockholm Office of the Prosecutor from 1990 to 1992.

Between 1993 and 1994 she was a legal adviser to the Government of the Republic of Estonia and from 1994 to 1997 was Head of the Human Rights Bureau of the Legal Department of the Ministry of Foreign Affairs, and was the Representative of Estonia in the European Commission against Racism and Intolerance from 1994 to 1999.

From 1997 to 1999 she held the role of Director General of the Legal Department of the Ministry of Foreign Affairs and was Representative of Estonia in the Human Rights Committee of the Council of Europe

Between 1999 and 2003, she was State Secretary of Estonia.

From 2003 to 2006, she was Ambassador of Estonia to Portugal, becoming Undersecretary for Legal and Consular Affairs of the Ministry of Foreign Affairs between 2006 and 2010

Between 2007 and 2010 she served as the Estonian Non-Resident Ambassador to Israel and from 2010 to 2014 was Ambassador to the United Kingdom of Great Britain and Northern Ireland

From 2014 to 2016 she was Director General of the Department for European and Trans-Atlantic Cooperation of the Ministry of Foreign Affairs, becoming Director General of the Department for European and Trans-Atlantic Cooperation of the Ministry of Foreign Affairs acting as the Undersecretary for European and Trans-Atlantic Cooperation in 2016-2017.

In 2018 she was Director General of the Department for European Affairs of the Ministry of Foreign Affairs

Aino Lepik von Wirén was appointed Estonian Ambassador to Ireland in 2018.
