= Kalju Lepik =

Estonian poet (1920–1999)

- Born: 7 October 1920; Koeru Parish, Järva County, Estonia
- Died: 30 May 1999 (aged 78); Tallinn, Estonia
- Occupation: Poet
- Years active: 1939–1999
- Spouse: Asta Lepik
- Children: Aino Lepik von Wirén

Kalju Lepik (7 October 1920 – 30 May 1999) was an Estonian poet who lived as an exile for most of his life.

Lepik published his first poems in 1939 in Tartu students' journals Iloli and Tuleviku Rajad ('The Paths of Future'). In 1940 he founded the art society Tuulisui, that continued its existence in Swedish exile from 1945 on. In 1943 and 1944 he fought as a conscript in the Waffen-SS unit Estonian Legion. He became a refugee in 1944 and settled in Stockholm for many years.

Lepik consistently defended the rights of the Estonian refugees in Sweden. In 1946 he founded in Stockholm the exile publishing house Eesti Raamat. In 1966 he became the head of the Baltic Archive in Sweden. From 1982 on, Lepik was the chairman of the Estonian Writers' Union in exile (Välismaine Eesti Kirjanike Liit). In 1990 and 1998, Lepik was awarded the Juhan Liiv poetry prize as well as the annual prize of Estonian literature in 1998.

Lepik's earlier poems are passionately patriotical. In addition, satire can be found. In Lepik's later poetry, pessimistic elements prevail. In his later years, he gradually discarded all kinds of political motives and exalted patriotic pathos.

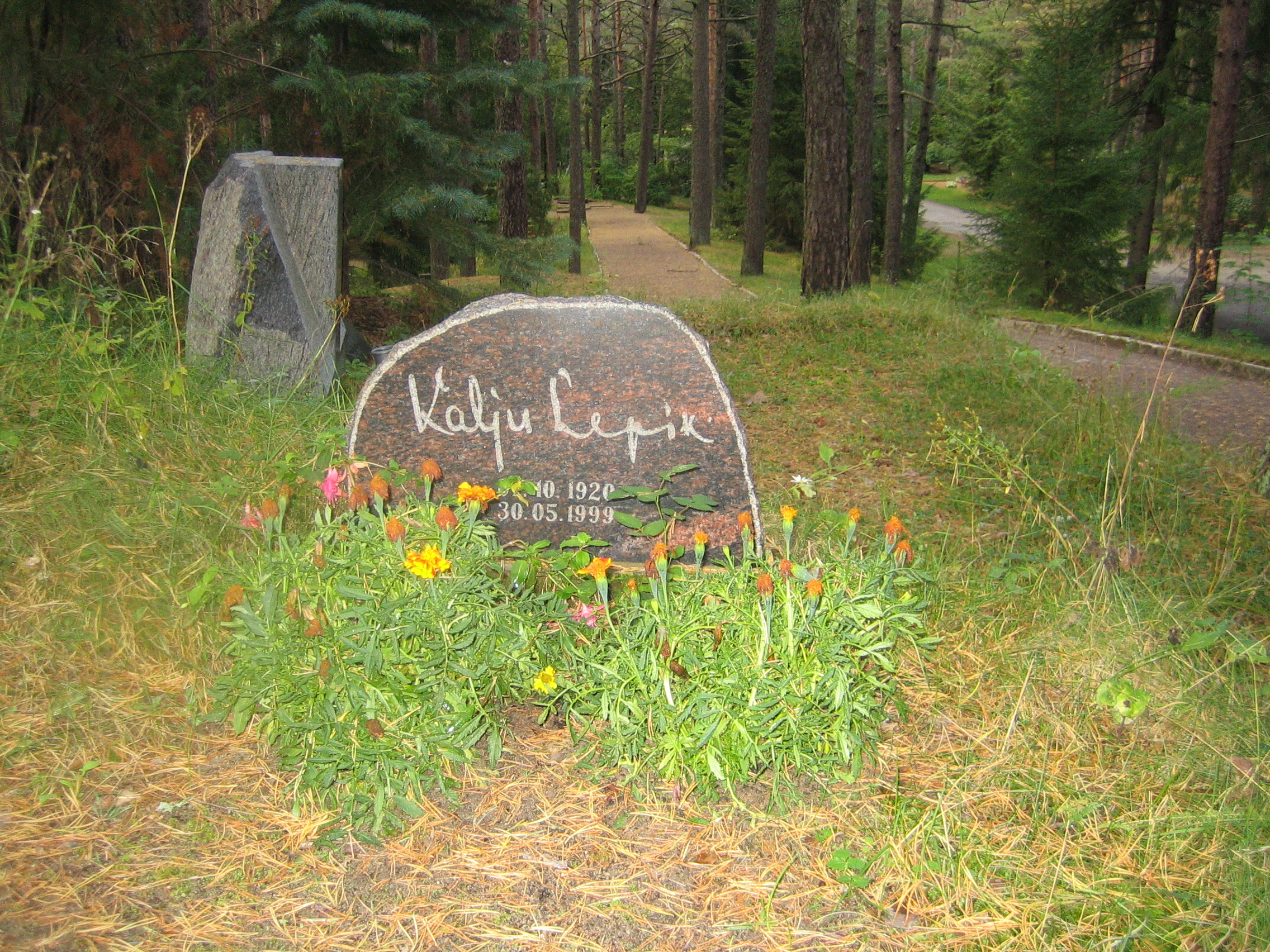
Lepik's gravestone at Metsakalmistu in Tallinn

Lepik was married to Asta Lepik. He is the father of the Estonian politician and diplomat Aino Lepik von Wirén (born 1961). His last collections of poetry were published in Estonia and he died there in 1999.

== Notable collections of poetry ==
- Nägu koduaknas (Stockholm 1946)
- Mängumees (Stockholm 1948)
- Kerjused treppidel (Vadstena 1949)
- Merepõhi (Stockholm 1951)
- Muinasjutt Tiigrimaast (Lund 1955)
- Kivimurd (Lund 1958)
- Kollased nõmmed (Lund 1965)
- Marmorpagulane (Lund 1968)
- Verepõld (Lund 1973)
- Klaasist mehed (Lund 1978)
- Kadunud külad (Lund 1985)
- Öötüdruk (Tallinn 1992)
- Pihlakamarja rist (Tartu 1997)
