= Soviet partisans in Estonia =

Soviet guerrilla warfare in Nazi occupied Estonia in 1940s

The Soviet partisans in Estonia were Communist partisans who attempted to wage guerrilla warfare against the German armed forces during the German occupation of Estonia. The majority of partisans sent in by the Soviets were quickly picked up by the local Estonian militias.

== Background ==
The war between Germany and the Soviet Union broke out after one year of Soviet occupation in Estonia. From July to December 1941, Estonia was cleared of Soviet armed forces by Germans who were assisted by Estonian national partisans. The Germans refrained from looting and excessive murders, but retaliated for armed resistance by burning down villages, amongst other things. The territory of German-occupied Estonia was incorporated into Reichskommissariat Ostland. In Generalbezirk Estland there was established a German civilian administration and a German-controlled Estonian police force.

Soviet partisans often robbed wealthier peasants and provoked German reprisals. The Soviet partisans were not very active in Lithuania (numbering around 5,000), were even less notable in Latvia (mainly in the Latgale region) and least active in Estonia, where throughout most of the war, by 1944 only 234 partisans were fighting and none were volunteers, all being either NKVD or Red Army personnel. The partisans found it impossible to establish permanent bases in Estonia, one reporting "it is dangerous to visit a village where even one Estonian lives". In effect, those groups were rather small in Estonia, often consisting of Soviet paratroopers brought from the USSR proper, and never even reaching the degree of pro-Soviet guerrilla warfare in Lithuania (which, in turn, was minor compared with Soviet resistance activities in neighbouring Belarus).

1500 Soviet partisans fought in Estonia in 1941-1944, many of them were killed by Nazi occupants and their local collaborators.

More than 500 Soviet partisans who fought in Estonia in 1941-1944 were awarded the orders, decorations, and medals of the Soviet Union. Two Soviet partisans (Leen Kulman and Vladimir Fedorov) who fought in Estonia were awarded the title Hero of the Soviet Union (posthumously) and five other (Eduard Aartee, Arno Avarsoo, Richard Melts, Roland Valkman and Ilmar Jürisson) were awarded the Order of Lenin.

== See also ==
- Estonian anti-German resistance movement 1941–1944
- Soviet partisans in Latvia
- Lithuanian partisans

== Sources ==
- П.А. Ларин. Эстонский народ в Великой Отечественной войне 1941–1945 / сокр. пер. с эст. — Таллин: АН ЭССР, 1964.
- Л.Н. Бычков. Партизанское движение в годы Великой Отечественной войны в 1941-1945 (краткий очерк). — Москва: Мысль, 1965.
- Р.Я. Луми. Мстители. Таллин: Ээсти Раамат, 1967. — 263 стр.: илл.
- Э.Я. Сыгель. Дружба, закалённая в огне войны [пер. с эст.]. — Таллин: Ээсти Раамат, 1975. — 176 с.
