= Taimar Peterkop =

Estonian civil servant

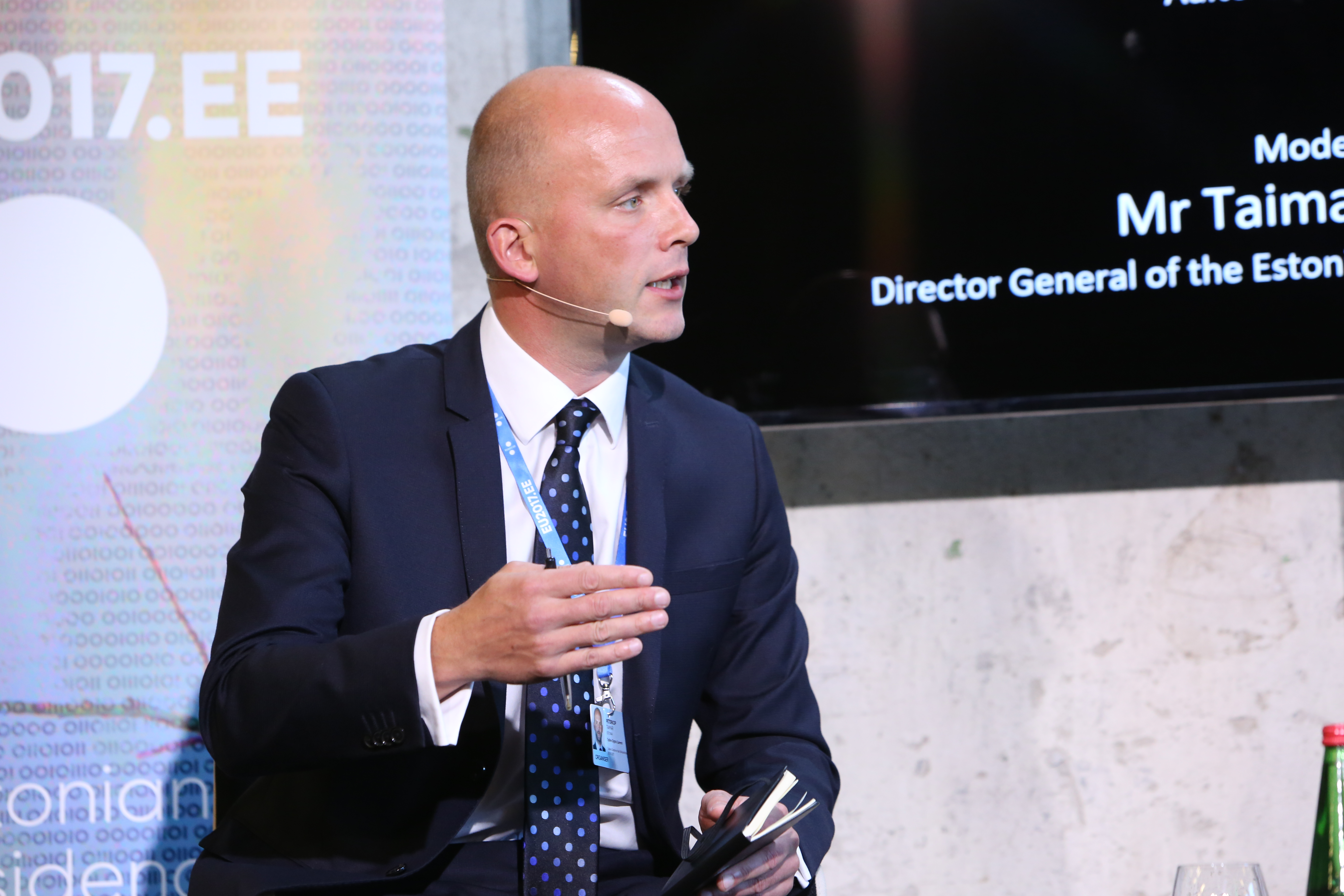
Taimar Peterkop in 2017

Taimar Peterkop (born 20 January 1977 in Tallinn) is an Estonian civil servant.

From 2018 to 2025, he was State Secretary of Estonia.

Between 2015–2018, he was the head of the Estonian Information System Authority (Estonian: Riigi Infosüsteemi Amet).
