= Jüri Uluots =

Estonian politician (1890–1945)

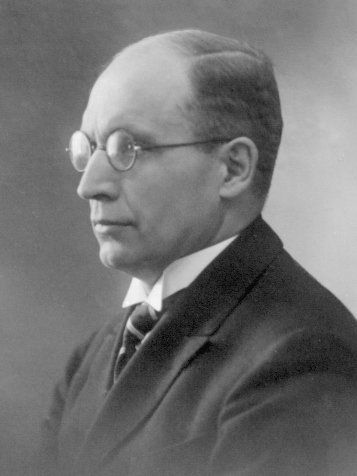
- Jüri Uluots

Prime Minister in the duties of the President
- In office 20 June 1940 – 9 January 1945
- Prime Minister: Otto Tief
- Preceded by: Konstantin Päts as President
- Succeeded by: August Rei

Prime Minister of Estonia
- In office 12 October 1939 – 20 June 1940
- President: Konstantin Päts
- Preceded by: Kaarel Eenpalu
- Succeeded by: Himself (as Prime Minister in the duties of the President)

Personal details
- Born: 13 January 1890 Kirbla Parish, Governorate of Estonia, Russian Empire
- Died: 9 January 1945 (aged 54) Stockholm, Sweden
- Education: St. Petersburg University

Jüri Uluots (13 January 1890 – 9 January 1945) was an Estonian prime minister, journalist, prominent attorney and distinguished Professor and Dean of the Faculty of Law at the University of Tartu.

== Early life ==
Uluots was born in Kirbla Parish (now Lääneranna Parish), in the Wiek County of the Governorate of Estonia in 1890 and studied law at St. Petersburg University in 1910–1918. He subsequently taught Roman and Estonian law at the University of Tartu until 1944. Uluots was also an editor of the Kaja newspaper 1919–1920, and editor-in-chief of Postimees 1937–1938.

== Political career ==
Uluots was elected to the Riigikogu, the Estonian parliament, for 1920–1926, and from 1929 through 1932. He was speaker of the Riigivolikogu (lower chamber) from 4 April 1938 to 12 October 1939. Uluots then served as prime minister from 1939 until June 1940 when Soviet troops entered Estonia and installed a new Soviet puppet government led by Johannes Vares, whereas Uluots' constitutional government went underground (and later, in exile). The communist puppet government was never recognized by the United States, United Kingdom and other western powers who considered it and the August 1940 annexation of Estonia into the USSR illegal.

After the Estonian president Konstantin Päts was arrested by Soviet occupation forces and deported to Russia in July 1940, Professor Uluots became prime minister in the duties of the president as dictated by the Estonian constitution. When the Nazis invaded Soviet-occupied Estonia in 1941 the communist government was overthrown. On July 29, 1941, Uluots met with the Nazi military government of Tartu, thanked them for freeing Estonia and asked them to allow him to form the government of independent Estonia with its owned armed forces; however, his request was turned down, and the Nazis offered him to head the Estonian Self-Administration, but he refused.

In January 1944, the front was pushed back by the Soviet Army almost all the way to the former Estonian border. Narva was evacuated. Jüri Uluots delivered a radio address that implored all able-bodied men born from 1904 through 1923 to report for German military service (Before this, Uluots had opposed Estonian mobilization.) The call drew support from all across the country: 38,000 draftees appeared at German registration centers. Several thousand Estonians who had joined the Finnish army came back across the Gulf of Finland to join the newly formed Territorial Defense Force, assigned to defend Estonia against the Soviet advance. It was hoped that by engaging in such a war Estonia would be able to attract Western support for the cause of Estonia's independence from the USSR and thus ultimately succeed in achieving independence.

In March 1944 the National Committee of the Republic of Estonia was formed by the underground resistance movement in German-occupied Estonia. By April 1944 a large number of the committee members were arrested by the German security agencies. The Committee aimed to establish of a provisional government during expected German withdrawal as the Red Army had reached the border of Estonia on 2 February 1944. On 20 April 1944, the National Committee selected the Electoral Committee of the Republic of Estonia. The Committee determined that the Soviet-era appointment of Johannes Vares as prime minister by Konstantin Päts had been illegal and that Uluots had assumed the President's duties from 21 June 1940 onwards. On 21 June 1944, Jüri Uluots appointed Otto Tief as deputy prime minister.

As the Germans retreated in September 1944, Uluots appointed a new government, headed by Otto Tief. On 20 September, the Estonian national government was proclaimed. Estonian forces seized the government buildings in Toompea and ordered the German forces to leave.

Tief's government left Tallinn prior to the Soviet army's arrival and went into hiding. But most of the cabinet members were later arrested and suffered various repressions by the Soviet authorities, or were sent to labour camps in Siberia. The remainder of the government fled to Stockholm, Sweden, where it operated in exile from 1944 to 1992 when Heinrich Mark, who was prime minister in duties of the president, presented his credentials to incoming president Lennart Meri.

Four days short of his 55th birthday, Uluots died of gastric cancer shortly after arriving in Sweden in 1945.

== Awards ==
1938 – Order of the White Star I

Preceded by none	Speaker of the Riigivolikogu; 1938 – 1939	Succeeded by Otto Pukk
Preceded by Kaarel Eenpalu	Prime Minister of Estonia; 1939 – 1940	Succeeded by vacant
Preceded by President of Estonia; Konstantin Päts; 1938 – 1940	Prime Minister of Estonia; In the duties of the President; 1940 – 1945	Succeeded by August Rei 1945–1963
