= Mihkel Klaassen =

Estonian lawyer

Mihkel Klaassen (24 February 1880 – 7 March 1952) was a justice of the Supreme Court of Estonia since 1924.

Klaassen was a member of the Electoral Committee (Estonian: Vabariigi Presidendi Asetäitja Valimiskogu) that decided the Soviet-era appointment of Johannes Vares as prime minister by Konstantin Päts had been illegal and stated, that Jüri Uluots is prime minister acting as President of the Estonian Republic on April 20, 1944.

He was the father of Professor Olaf-Mihkel Klaassen of Tartu University.
