= Artur Mägi =

Estonian politician

Artur Mägi (August 29, 1904 – November 9, 1981) was an Estonian legal scientist and the Chancellor of Justice of Estonian government-in-exile.

== Biography ==
Mägi studied at the University of Tartu, Faculty of Law from 1923 to 1929.

In 1944, Mägi fled to Sweden with his wife.

From 1953 to 1963, Mägi served as a lecturer at the Estonian Scientific Institute (Estonian: Eesti Teaduslik Instituut). He was also a member of the Estonian Learned Society in Sweden.

From 1949 to 1981, he held the position of Chancellor of Justice of Estonia while it was in exile.

== Personal life ==
Mägi married Lydia Taevere in 1931.
