= Kirbla =

Village in Estonia

Coordinates: 58°44′N 23°57′E

- Village
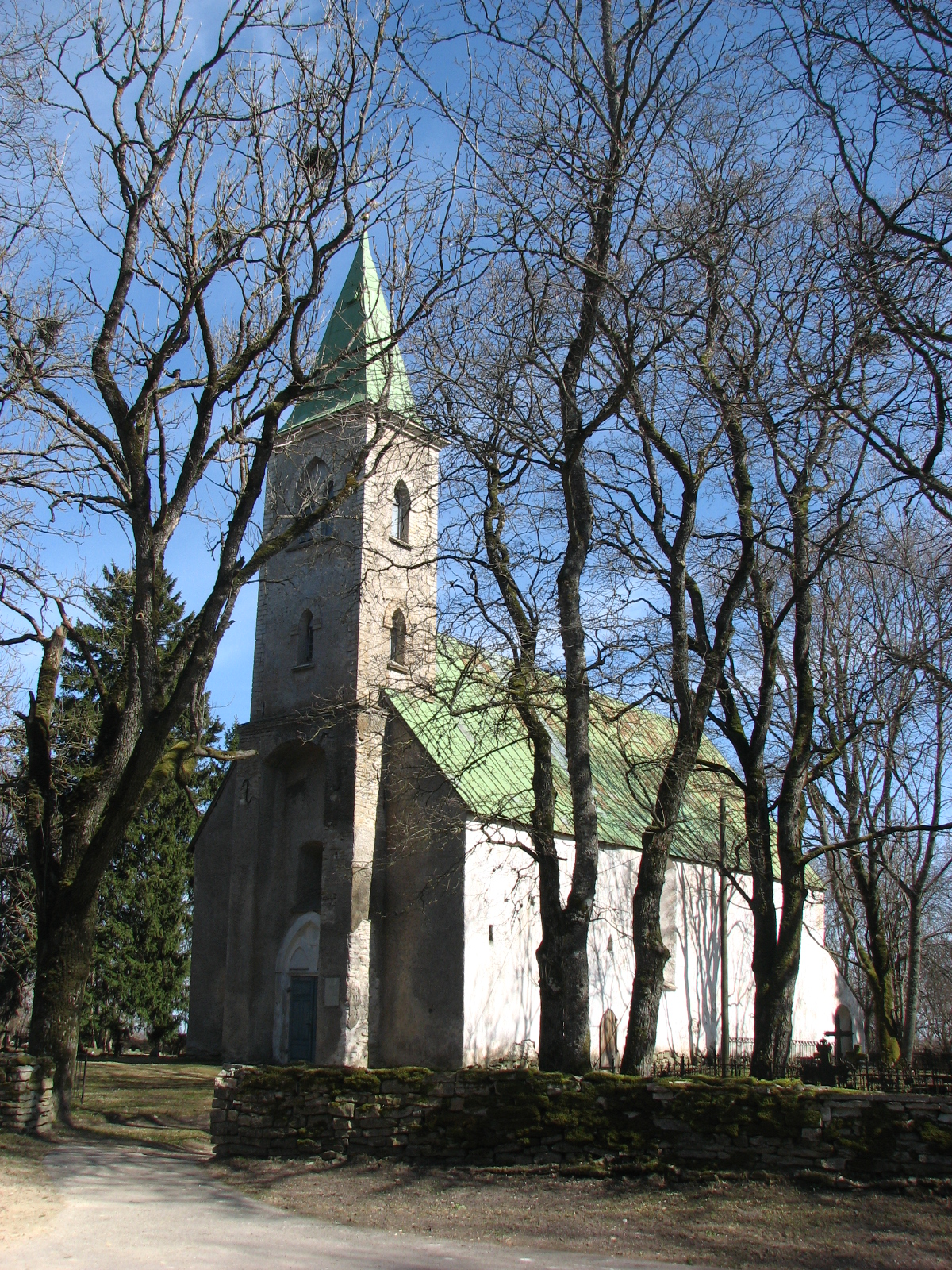
- Kirbla St. Nicholas Lutheran Church, built around 1500.
- Interactive map of Kirbla
- Country: Estonia
- County: Pärnu County
- Parish: Lääneranna Parish
- Time zone: UTC+2 (EET)
  - Summer (DST): UTC+3 (EEST)

Kirbla (German: Kirrefer) is a village in Lääneranna Parish, Pärnu County, in western Estonia.

Eerik Kumari (1912–1984), biologist and pioneer of ornithology, was born (as Erik Mathias Sits) in Kirbla.
