= Tõnis Kint =

Estonian politician

Prime Minister in duties of the President
- In office 23 December 1970 – 1 March 1990
- Preceded by: Aleksander Warma
- Succeeded by: Heinrich Mark

Acting Prime Minister of Estonian Exile Government
- In office 29 March 1963 – 23 December 1970
- Preceded by: Aleksander Warma
- Succeeded by: Heinrich Mark
- In office 22 August 1960 – 1 January 1962
- Preceded by: Johannes Sikkar
- Succeeded by: Aleksander Warma

Minister of Agriculture of Estonian Exile Government
- In office 1953–1970
- Preceded by: Kaarel Liidak
- Succeeded by: Elmar Järvesoo

Personal details
- Born: 17 August 1896 Paasioja, Suure-Jaani Parish, Kreis Fellin, Governorate of Livonia, Russian Empire
- Died: 5 January 1991 (aged 94) Örnsköldsvik, Sweden
- Spouse(s): Salme Redlich, since 1953 Magda Marianne Rassmann
- Children: Arne Kint, Oole Kint

Tõnis Kint (17 August [O.S. 5 August] 1896 – 5 January 1991) was an Estonian politician. He served as "Acting Prime Minister of Estonian Exile Government" from 22 August 1960 to 1 January 1962 and again from 29 March 1963 to 23 December 1970 and as "Prime Minister in duties of the President" (in other words, Estonian head of state in exile) from 23 December 1970 to 1 March 1990.

From 7 April 1938 member of the Chamber of Deputies. 1953-1960 Estonian Minister of Agriculture, and in 1960-1962 and in 1963-1970 Acting Prime Minister of the Estonian Government in Exile.

== Education ==
Kint graduated from the High School of Sciences in Tartu. In 1916, he studied in the building department of the Riga Polytechnical School, which was later evacuated to Moscow. In 1918, he studied in the agricultural department of the Baltic Technical University, opened in Riga by the German occupation administration. In 1920–1928, he studied intermittently at the agricultural department of Tartu University. In 1924, he received additional education in the agricultural and veterinary department in Copenhagen Agricultural and Veterinary University.

== Military career ==
In 1916, Kint was mobilised to the Russian Army, finished military school at Tsaritsyn (known today as Volgograd in Russia) in 1917. During the First World War, he served in an infantry regiment of the Russian Army. In the beginning of 1918, Kint joined a newly formed Estonian regiment at Viljandi. From 1918 to 1920 he fought in the Estonian War of Independence on the broad-tracked armour train No. 2, as Commander of its machine-gun commandos. At the end of the war he was promoted to Lieutenant and acting commander of the train.

== Life after the wars ==
From 1928 to 1932, Kint was Head of the Agricultural Bookkeeping Department. From 1932 to 1938, he served as Assistant and managing director of the department. From 1938 to 1940, he was Director of the Chamber of Agriculture. In 1940, he put up a candidacy on the Riigivolikogu elections as one of the counter-candidates of the "Estonian Working People's Union." His candidacy was deleted with other counter-candidacies. During the German occupation was director of the market management department in the Eesti Omavalitsus (Estonian Self-Government), he was released due to conflicts with the occupation power. Thereafter lived in his father's farm and worked in the Estonian Consumers' Centre.

In 1944, Kint escaped to Sweden. From 1945 to 1949 was employed at the Uppsala Agricultural University (at Ultuna) as archive assistant, 1945-51 an agricultural adviser in the Stockholm County, and in 1951-1975 a researcher for the Swedish Agricultural Union (Landbrukarnas Riksförbund) and in its Agricultural Economics Research Institute (Jordbrukets Utredningsinstitut), in 1957 editor-in-chief of the newspaper Teataja. He resigned from this job in 1975.

From 1950 he was a Member of the Board and later an Honorary Member of the Agricultural Union of Free Estonians. From 1971 to 1975, he was Chairman of the Estonian National Council, Honorary Member and Honorary Chairman of the Estonian Agronomists' Society in Sweden and Honorary Member of the Swedish Society for the Development of Rural Regions (Sällskapet för Landbygdsutveckling).

In 1983 the Polish government-in-exile awarded to him the Chevalier of the Polish Order of Restitution (Order Odrodzenia Polski).

Kint had many publications in the field of agriculture. He also published his memoirs, and the book The Broad Tracked Armour Train No. 2 in the War of Liberty with Edvin Reinvaldt.

== Personal life ==
Kint's first spouse was Salme Redlich.

Since 1953, Kint was married with Magda Marianne Rassmann (1906-1978).

Kint's children: Arne Kint, Oole Kint.

Political offices
Preceded by Aleksander Warma	Prime Minister of Estonia in exile 1964–1970	Succeeded by Heinrich Mark
Preceded by Aleksander Warma	Prime Minister in duties of the President; 1970–1990	Succeeded by Heinrich Mark
