= Karl Johannes Terras =

Estonian politician (1890–1942)

Karl-Johannes Terras (9 September 1890 Vaivara Parish (now part of Narva-Jõesuu), Kreis Wierland – 25 February 1942 Kirov Oblast) was an Estonian politician. He was a member of VI Riigikogu (its National Council).

In 1916 he graduated from the St. Petersburg University specializing in law .

From 1920 to 1940 he was the State Secretary of Estonia. In this capacity he was awarded the Latvian Order of the Three Stars 1st Class on 15 November 1935.

He was also active in Estonian sport life. Between 1934 and 1940, he was the chairman of Estonian Sport Central Union (Estonian: Eesti Spordi Keskliit).
