= Kaarel Liidak =

Estonian agronomist and politician

Kaarel Liidak (until 1936 Karl Liidemann, 12 November 1889 Sindi – 16 January 1945 Karksi-Nuia) was an Estonian agronomist, agriculture minister and politician, member and chairman of the National Committee of the Republic of Estonia from March to August 1944.

== Recognition ==
- 1936 – Honorary Member of the Estonian Agronomic Society
- 1938 – 3rd class Order of the White Star
