= Arved Ruusa =

Estonian politician and lawyer

Arved Ruusa (28 August 1900 – 15 December 1992) was an Estonian politician and lawyer. From 1971 to 1990 he was State Secretary of Estonia (in exile). He was born in Vana-Kuuste Rural Municipality. In 1933 he graduated from the University of Tartu's Faculty of Law.

From 1928 until 1935, he was in police service. In 1944, he fled to Sweden.
