= Heinrich Mark =

Estonian politician (1911-2004)

5th Prime Minister in duties of the President
- In office 1 March 1990 – 6 October 1992
- Preceded by: Tõnis Kint
- Succeeded by: President Lennart Meri (in country)

Acting Prime Minister of Estonian Exile Government
- In office 8 May 1971 – 1 March 1990
- Preceded by: Tõnis Kint
- Succeeded by: Enno Penno

Secretary of State of Estonian Exile Government
- In office 1953–1971
- Preceded by: Helmut Maandi
- Succeeded by: Arved Ruusa

Personal details
- Born: 1 October 1911 Krootuse, Governorate of Livonia, Russian Empire
- Died: 2 August 2004 (aged 92) Stockholm, Sweden
- Spouse: Alice Vreeman
- Education: University of Tartu

Heinrich Mark (1 October 1911 – 2 August 2004) was an Estonian politician and Prime Minister of the Estonian Government in Exile.

He was Prime Minister in duties of the President of the Republic of Estonia from 1 March 1990 to 6 October 1992, being the last Estonian head of state in exile, as Estonian independence was restored in 1991.

== Life ==
Mark was one of four brothers: Adolf (1905–1947; died in a Siberian prison camp), Albert (1907–1945; killed as a Forest Brother) and Aksel (1913–2014), who was an agronomist, journalist and Estonian Minister of the Interior in exile between 1962 and 1992. Mark studied in Võru, graduated from the Tartu Teachers' Seminar. In 1933–1938 he studied at the legal department of the University of Tartu.

From 1938 to 1940, Mark was an elementary school teacher. In 1940 he served as solicitor to the barrister P. Sepp in Tartu. In 1941–1943 he practiced as a solicitor in Tallinn. In 1940, after the occupation of Estonia, he was a secretary of Tartu University for a short period, but left on the recommendation of the rector Hans Kruus. In 1940, he was put up as a candidate for the Riigivolikogu elections as an alternative candidate to the Estonian Working People's Union, but was deleted from the list of candidates. He later hid in Estonia, escaped to Finland in 1943, and was one of the organisers of the Estonian Bureau (an Estonian exile organisation) and assistant to the Editor-in-Chief of the Malevlane (a newspaper of the Estonians in the Finnish Army).

In 1944 Mark moved to Sweden, where he was an assistant at the National Committee of Foreigners. From 1945 to 1956, he was Chairman of the education working group of the Estonian Committee, 1954–1975 Director of the Bureau and assistant Chairman of the Estonian Committee, 1975–1982 Chairman of the Estonian Committee, and from 1982 onward served as Honorary Chairman of the Estonian Committee. From 1951 to 1979 he was also Secretary-General of the Estonian National Council.

== Honours and decorations ==
In 1998, Mark was awarded the honorary Doctor of Law degree by Tartu University. Further, he was made an Honorary Member of the Estonian Literature Society, given the Golden Badge of the Estonian National Foundation, the I Class Gold Order of Merit of the Republic of Poland, and the II Class Order of the National Coat of Arms of the Republic of Estonia.

== See also ==
- Enno Penno

Political offices
Preceded by Helmut Maandi	State Secretary of Estonia (in exile); 1953–1971	Succeeded by Arved Ruusa
Preceded by Tõnis Kint	Prime Minister of Estonia in exile 1971–1990	Succeeded by Enno Penno
Preceded by Tõnis Kint	Prime Minister in duties of the President; 1990–1992	Succeeded by Lennart Meri (President of Estonia)
