= Johannes Vares =

Estonian writer and politician (1890–1946)

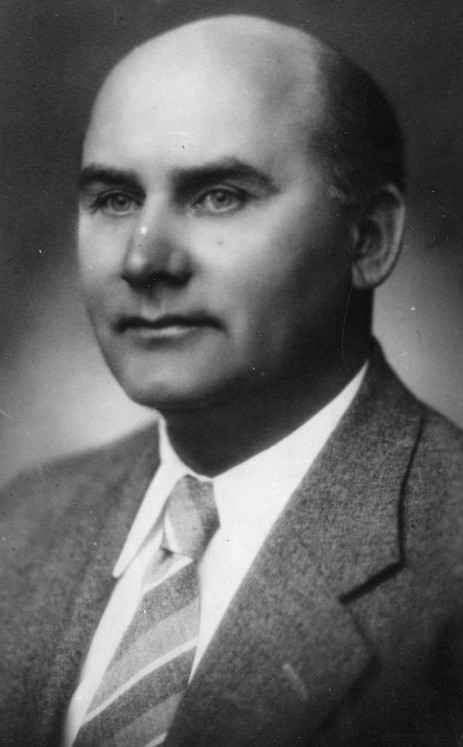
- Vares in 1931

Chairman of the Presidium of the Supreme Soviet of the Estonian SSR
- In office 25 August 1940 – 29 November 1946
- President: Konstantin Päts
- Preceded by: Position established
- Succeeded by: Eduard Päll

Prime Minister in the duties of the President
- In office 23 July 1940 – 25 August 1940

Prime Minister of Estonia
- In office 21 June 1940 – 25 August 1940
- Preceded by: Jüri Uluots
- Succeeded by: Position abolished (de facto)

Personal details
- Born: 12 January 1890 Kiisa, Kreis Fellin, Governorate of Livonia, Russian Empire
- Died: 29 November 1946 (aged 56) Tallinn, then part of Estonian SSR, Soviet Union
- Party: CPSU
- Other political affiliations: Communist Party of Estonia
- Education: University of Kiev
- Profession: Poet, writer, military doctor, gynecologist

Johannes Vares (pen name Barbarus or Vares-Barbarus 12 January 1890 [O.S. 31 December 1889] – 29 November 1946) was an Estonian and Soviet poet, medical doctor, and politician.

== Early life and education ==
Vares was born in a farmer family in the village of Kiisa, near Viljandi, Estonia. He received secondary education at Pärnu Gymnasium, and in 1910–1914 studied medicine at the University of Kiev.

== Medical career ==
Vares served as a military physician in World War I, and after that as a military physician for the Estonian Army during the Estonian War of Independence (1918–1920). He was awarded the Estonian Cross of Liberty for the participation.

In the 1920s, Vares started working as a medical doctor in Pärnu. He subsequently became a well-known poet as well as a radical socialist, using the pen name Johannes Barbarus.

== Prime minister of Estonia ==
During World War II, after the Stalinist Soviet Union invaded and occupied Estonia in June 1940, Andrei Zhdanov, leader of the Soviet aggression, forced the Estonian president Konstantin Päts to appoint Vares as prime minister of a communist-dominated puppet government. Päts resigned in July 1940, and Vares formally took over most presidential duties. The puppet regime declared Estonia a "Soviet Socialist Republic" (SSR), and petitioned to join the Soviet Union as a constituent republic. He headed the delegation to Moscow on 6 August 1940 that formally delivered the petition to Stalin and the Soviet government, an act that has tainted Vares as a traitor to the majority of Estonian people. When the Kremlin "accepted" the petition in August 1940, Vares remained as nominal head of state, now titled as chairman of the Estonian Supreme Soviet, until 1946. From 12 September 1940, Vares was a member of the Central Committee of the Communist Party of Estonia, joining soon after the party had been merged into the All-Union Communist Party (bolsheviks) of the USSR.

== Exile in Russia ==
Following the German invasion of Estonia in 1941, Vares fled to Soviet Russia, where he lived in exile from 1941 to 1944, until the Soviets reconquered Estonia.

On 20 April 1944, the Electoral Committee of the Republic of Estonia (the institution specified in the Constitution for electing the Acting President of the Republic) held a clandestine meeting in Tallinn. The participants included Jüri Uluots, the last Prime Minister of Estonia before the Soviet occupation, the substitute for Commander-in-Chief of the Armed Forces Johan Holberg, the chairman of the Chamber of Deputies Otto Pukk, the second deputy vice-chairman of the National Council Alfred Maurer, and State judge Mihkel Klaassen. The Committee declared Päts' appointment of Vares as Prime Minister had been illegal. Accordingly, it held that Uluots had assumed the President's duties from 21 June 1940 onwards.

Since Estonia regained independence in 1990/91, it has maintained that all laws, decrees and treaties made in 1940–1941 in Soviet-occupied Estonia, including those of Vares' puppet government were legally invalid. The upper house of Parliament had been dissolved soon after the 16–17 June 1940 Soviet invasion and was never reconvened, nor re-elected. According to the then Constitution of Estonia, all laws had to pass both houses of parliament before being promulgated. This applied also to the new pro-Soviet 1940 "electoral law" under which the blatantly rigged elections of 14–15 July 1940 were conducted. It was this sham election that produced the so-called "People's Riigikogu" which then declared Estonia a "Soviet republic" and "requested" to join the Soviet Union. On that basis, Estonia maintains that the electoral law was illegal and unconstitutional, rendering all acts of the "People's Riigikogu" void. Estonia also maintains that as a result, it did not need to follow the constitutional process of secession from the Soviet Union, since it was reasserting an independence that still de jure existed.

== Return to Estonia and death ==
After returning to Estonia in 1944, Vares came under investigation by the Soviet NKVD for his activities in the Estonian War of Independence (1918–1920). He committed suicide in presidential residence in Kadriorg, Tallinn, in November 1946 and was buried at the Metsakalmistu.

== See also ==
- Johannes Vares' cabinet

== Citations and references ==
=== Cited sources ===
- Miljan, Toivo (2004). Historical Dictionary of Estonia. Maryland, USA: Scarecrow Press. ISBN 0-8108-4904-6.

Political offices
Preceded by Office created	Chairman of the Presidium of the Supreme Soviet of the Estonian SSR; 1940–1946	Succeeded by Nigol Andresen
