= Hugo Pärtelpoeg =

Estonian lawyer and politician

Hugo Osvald Pärtelpoeg (7 February 1899 in Vaiatu manor, Tartu County – 29 April 1951 in Irkutsk Oblast) was an Estonian lawyer and politician.

From 18 September 1944 to 22 September 1944, he was Minister of Finance in Otto Tief's cabinet.

On 3 July 1945, the Military Chamber of the Supreme Court of the USSR sentenced Hugo Pärtelpoeg to eight years in a forced labor camp (Gulag) and five years in Russia. Pärtelpoeg died while incarcerated in 1951.
