= Alfred Maurer (politician) =

Estonian politician (1888–1954)

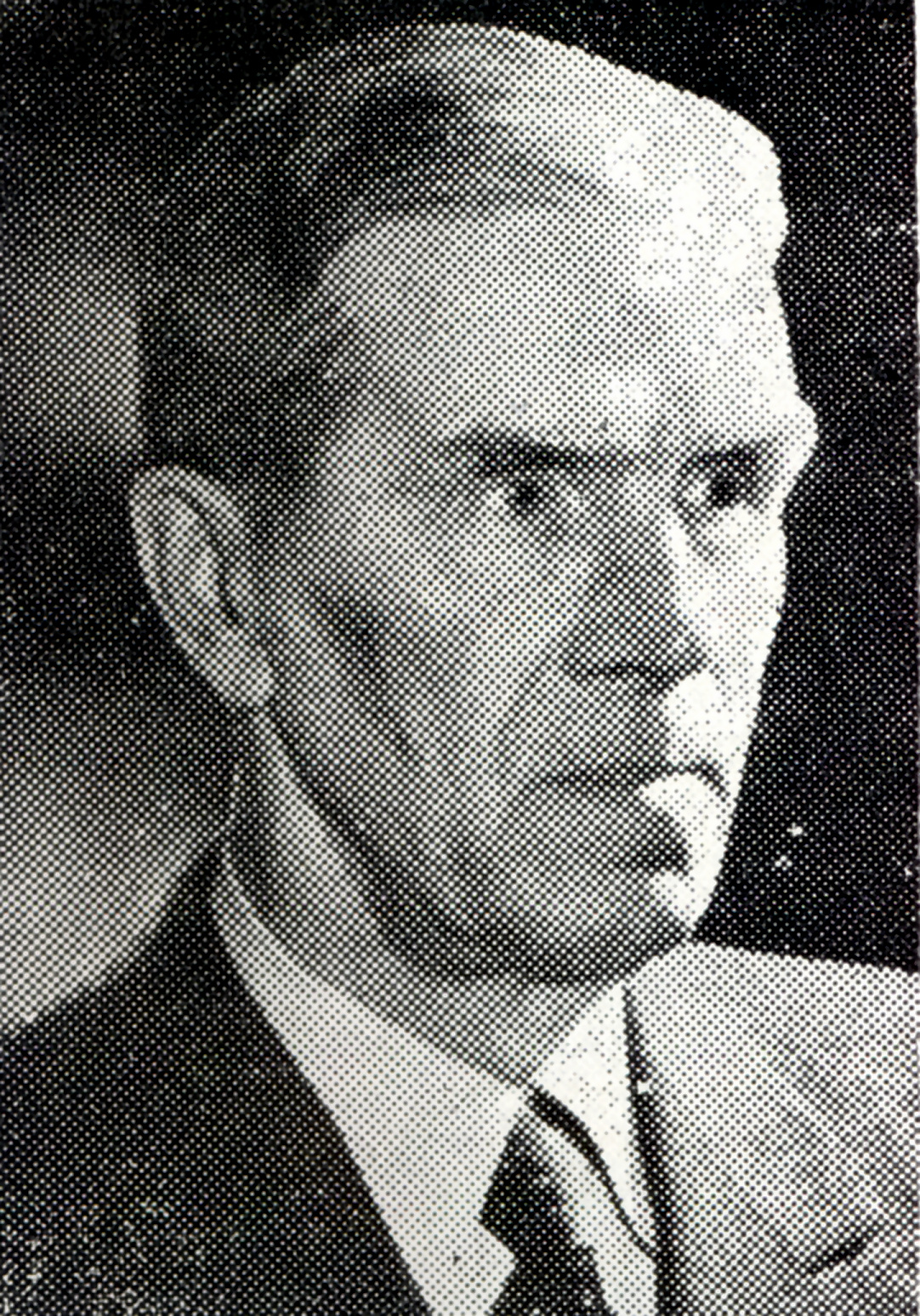
Alfred Maurer

Alfred Maurer (2 December 1888 Tallinn - 20 September 1954 Stockholm) was an Estonian lawyer and politician. He was a member of I Riigikogu. He was a member of the Riigikogu since 6 December 1922. He replaced Sergei Andrejev.
