= Riigi Teataja =

Government gazette of Estonia

Cover of Riigi Teataja Nr.1, 27. November 1918

Riigi Teataja (State Gazette) is a public journal of the Republic of Estonia. The first issue was published on 27 November 1918.

Since 1 June 2002, Riigi Teataja was published in electronic form, as Elektrooniline Riigi Teataja, in parallel with the paper version. The last issue of the paper version of Riigi Teataja was published on 31 May 2010.
