= Eenpalu =

Estonian family name

Eenpalu is an Estonian surname. Notable people with the surname include:

- Kaarel Eenpalu (1888–1942, before 1935 Karl Einbund), politician and journalist
- Linda Eenpalu (1890–1967, before 1935 Linda Einbund), politician
