= Konstantin Päts =

Estonian statesman and president (1874–1956)

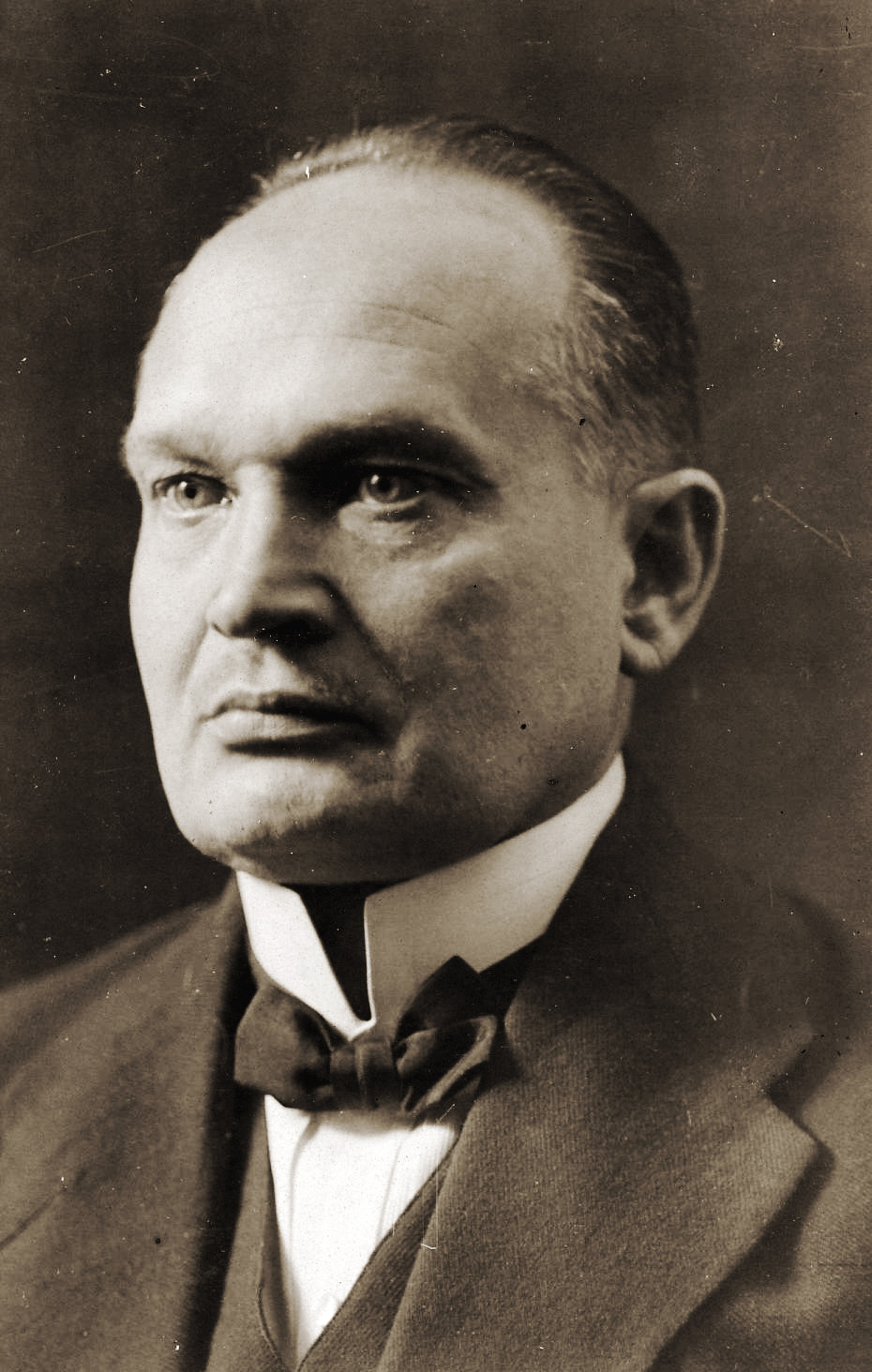
- Päts in 1923

1st President of Estonia
- In office 24 April 1938 – 23 July 1940
- Prime Minister: Kaarel Eenpalu (acting); Kaarel Eenpalu; Jüri Uluots; Johannes Vares (Note: Vares became nominally prime minister in 1940 under the Soviet occupation and has subsequently not been recognized as a legitimate head of government)
- Succeeded by: Jüri Uluots as Prime Minister in duties of the President; (Note: 1940–1944 in Estonia; since 1944 as president in exile) Lennart Meri as President after restoration of independence Johannes Vares as Prime Minister in duties of the President (during the Soviet occupation)

Chairman of the Council of Ministers of the Provisional Government of Estonia
- In office 24 February 1918 – 12 November 1918
- Preceded by: Independence declared, position established
- Succeeded by: Himself as Prime Minister of the Provisional Government

Prime Minister of the Provisional Government of Estonia
- In office 12 November 1918 – 8 May 1919
- Preceded by: Himself as Chairman of the Council of Ministers of the Provisional Government
- Succeeded by: Otto Strandman as Prime Minister

2nd, 4th, 11th, 14th and 16th State Elder of Estonia
- In office 25 January 1921 – 21 November 1922
- Preceded by: Ants Piip
- Succeeded by: Juhan Kukk
- In office 2 August 1923 – 26 March 1924
- Preceded by: Juhan Kukk
- Succeeded by: Friedrich Karl Akel
- In office 12 February 1931 – 19 February 1932
- Preceded by: Otto Strandman
- Succeeded by: Jaan Teemant
- In office 1 November 1932 – 18 May 1933
- Preceded by: Karl August Einbund
- Succeeded by: Jaan Tõnisson
- In office 21 October 1933 – 24 January 1934
- Preceded by: Jaan Tõnisson
- Succeeded by: Himself as Prime Minister in duties of the State Elder

6th Prime Minister of Estonia, in duties of the State Elder of Estonia
- In office 24 January 1934 – 3 September 1937
- Preceded by: Himself as State Elder
- Succeeded by: Himself as President-Regent

President-Regent of Estonia
- In office 3 September 1937 – 9 May 1938
- Preceded by: Himself as Prime Minister in duties of the State Elder
- Succeeded by: Himself as President; Kaarel Eenpalu as Prime Minister

Personal details
- Born: 23 February 1874 Tahkuranna Parish, Governorate of Livonia, Russian Empire
- Died: 18 January 1956 (aged 81) Burashevo, Kalininsky District, Kalinin Oblast, Russian SFSR, Soviet Union
- Party: Country People's Union (1917–1920); Farmers' Assemblies (1920–1932); Union of Settlers and Smallholders (1932–1935)
- Spouse: Wilhelma ("Helma") Ida Emilie Peedi (m. 1901; died 1910)
- Children: 2
- Relatives: Voldemar Päts (brother)
- Education: University of Tartu
- Profession: Lawyer, journalist, politician

Konstantin Päts (Note: Estonian pronunciation: [ˈkons.tɑnʲ.tin ˈpætʲs]) (23 February [O.S. 11 February] 1874 – 18 January 1956) was an Estonian statesman and the country's president from 1938 to 1940. Päts was one of the most influential politicians of the independent democratic Republic of Estonia, and during the two decades prior to World War II he also served five times as the country's State Elder. After the 16–17 June 1940 Soviet invasion and occupation of Estonia, Päts remained formally in office for over a month, until he was forced to resign, imprisoned by the new Stalinist regime, and deported to the USSR, where he died in 1956.

Päts was one of the first Estonians to become active in politics, and he then started a famous, nearly four-decade long, political rivalry with Jaan Tõnisson — first through journalism with his newspaper Teataja, later through politics. Although Päts was sentenced to death (in absentia) during the Russian Revolution of 1905, he was able to flee abroad, first to Switzerland, then to Finland, where he continued his literary work. He returned to Estonia (then part of the Russian Empire), and had to serve a prison sentence in 1910–1911.

After the February Revolution in 1917, Päts headed the provincial government of the newly formed Autonomous Governorate of Estonia, which was forced to go underground after the Bolshevik coup in November 1917. On 19 February 1918, Päts became one of the three members of the Estonian Salvation Committee that issued the Estonian Declaration of Independence on 24 February 1918. He headed the Estonian Provisional Government (1918–1919), although he was also imprisoned by the German occupation regime for several months in 1918. In the provisional government, Päts also served as Minister of Internal Affairs (1918) and Minister of War (1918–1919) that left him in charge of organizing the Estonian military in the War of Independence against the Soviet Russian invasion.

During the 1920s and early 1930s, Päts led one of the more prominent right-wing parties of the time – the conservative Farmers' Assemblies, which eventually merged into another party, the Union of Settlers and Smallholders in 1932. Päts was the Speaker of the Parliament (Riigikogu) (1922–1923) and served five times as State Elder, a post equivalent to that of president in Estonia's radically parliamentarian system (1921–1922, 1923–1924, 1931–1932, 1932–1933, and 1933–1934). During his last term as State Elder, he organized a self-coup to neutralise the right-wing populist Vaps Movement. He was supported by the army and the parliament. During the 1934–1938 "Era of Silence", many reforms were made and the economy grew, while he postponed the return of constitutional order. Largely supported by General Johan Laidoner, Commander of the Estonian Defence Forces, Päts ruled as Prime Minister in duties of the State Elder (1934–1937) and President-Regent (1937–1938) until a new constitution was adopted in 1938, after which Päts was elected the first President of Estonia. During his presidency, the Stalinist Soviet Union invaded and occupied Estonia in June 1940. As president, he was forced to sign decrees for over a month, until being arrested and deported to Soviet Russia, where he died in 1956.

== Family ==
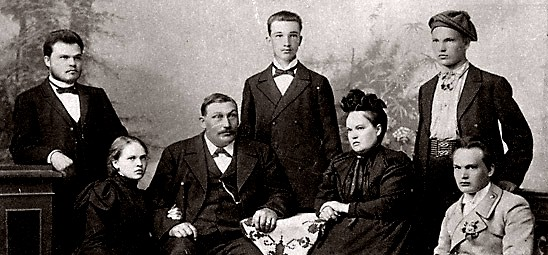
Päts with his family (from left): brother Nikolai, sister Marianna, father Jakob, brother Voldemar, mother Olga, brother Peeter, and Konstantin Päts (far right).

Päts' patrilineal ancestors originated from the village of Holstre near Viljandi, Estonia. His father, Jakob (Jaagup) Päts, was a housebuilder from Heimtali, near Viljandi. Konstantin's mother, Olga Päts (née Tumanova), was an orphan. According to some sources, she was raised in the Russian-speaking Razumovsky family (and her adoptive father was at one time the mayor of Valga in the then Governorate of Livonia). Other sources indicate that she may have grown up with the Krüdener family instead, and that the adoptive father was her uncle Baron Krüdener; however, it is more likely that she served the Krüdener family later as a governess. Jakob and Olga met while they were both working for the Krüdener family.

Päts had an elder brother, Nikolai (1871–1940), three younger brothers – Paul (1876–1881), Voldemar (1878–1958), and Peeter (1880–1942) – and a younger sister, Marianne (1888–1947). Since their mother Olga had been raised an Eastern Orthodox Christian, their father Jakob converted from Lutheranism to Eastern Orthodox faith. The children were all brought up in strong Orthodox traditions.

The family initially lived in Viljandi. Päts' father Jakob was one of the Estonian nationalist farmers, who in 1865 petitioned to Emperor Alexander II of Russia to remove the (what they considered oppressive) aristocratic privileges of Baltic German landowners. After the petition, Jakob came into conflict with the local nobility and in 1873 he was forced to move to Tahkuranna near Pärnu. As Päts' father was unable to find a job in Tahkuranna, the family moved to a rental apartment in Pärnu in 1882. Three years later, Jakob bought himself some land in Raeküla, near Pärnu, where they initially lived in a roadside tavern, but built a new house after the tavern burned down. Jakob divided his land into smaller lots and built half a dozen new houses on the site, which eventually grew into a borough, and later became a district of Pärnu.

== Early life ==
Konstantin Päts was born on 23 February [O.S. 11 February] 1874 near Tahkuranna. According to locals' memories, he was born on a neighbouring roadside farm, since his mother could not reach a doctor in time and was unable to make the last few kilometers back home. He was baptized in the Tahkuranna Orthodox Church. Konstantin started his education in the Orthodox parish school of Tahkuranna. In Pärnu, Konstantin attended the Russian language Orthodox parish school. Later, he attended the Riga Clerical Seminar in 1887–1892, but after deciding not to become a priest, he left for the high school in Pärnu.

From 1894 to 1898, he attended the Faculty of Law of Tartu University, from which he graduated as a cand. jur. After graduation, Päts served in the Russian 96th Infantry Regiment of Omsk in Pskov and was promoted an ensign. After rejecting an academic career in Tartu, he moved to Tallinn in 1900, to start a political career.

== Career ==
=== Journalism ===
In Tallinn, Konstantin Päts started his career as an assistant at the advocacy of Jaan Poska, but the job was not satisfactory for Päts. In Tartu, Jaan Tõnisson had already founded his nationalist newspaper Postimees in 1891; Päts was planning to found his own in Tallinn. The first inspiration came from writers Eduard Vilde and A. H. Tammsaare, who could not get a licence from the Ministry of Internal Affairs because of their social democratic views. Instead, they used the help of Päts as an unknown lawyer with an affiliation in the Orthodox Church.

Päts was assumed by the authorities to have had established a newspaper that was loyal to the Empire and would "unite all Orthodox Estonians"; however, in reality his newspaper had a radical political content. The first issue of the Teataja ("The Gazette") came out on 23 October [O.S. 10 October] 1901, starting a rivalry not only between Postimees and Teataja, but also between Jaan Tõnisson and Konstantin Päts personally for the position of leadership in the Estonian nationalist movement. Unlike the more nationalist and radically ideological Postimees, Teataja emphasized the importance of education and commerce for the nationalist cause. The work was made difficult by the strict censorship policies imposed by the Russian Empire's governmental authorities.

=== Early political career ===
Päts's first political goal was to take power in the towns, where Baltic Germans still controlled the municipal governments. Päts served as a municipal adviser in Tallinn from 1904; and together with Jaan Poska, he organized an electoral block between Estonians and liberal Russians, which managed to win at the 1904 Tallinn municipal elections. Päts became a member of the city council; and in April 1905, he became the deputy mayor, chairing the city council. His active work at the town government left him little time for his newspaper. Because of the lack of Päts’ supervision of Teataja, a group of revolutionaries, led by Hans Pöögelmann, had managed to take control in the newspaper’s staff and publish anti-government articles, calling people for a revolution.

During the 1905 Revolution, Päts was already an activist on self-government reform, where he supported national autonomy in the Baltic governorates. In the escalation of the revolution, his newspaper was closed and its staff members arrested. Päts found out about this in advance and managed to escape to Switzerland, only to find out that he had been condemned to death in the Russian Empire.

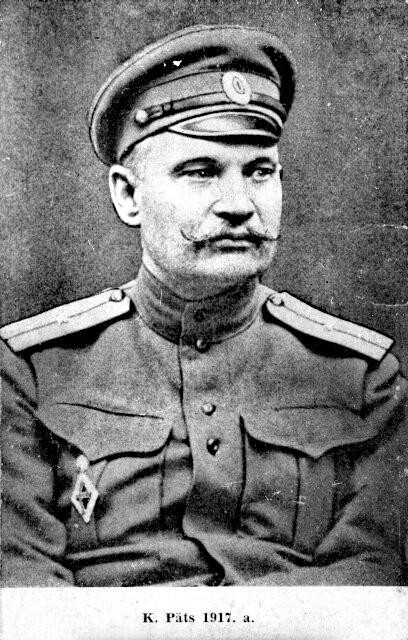
Ensign officer Konstantin Päts in 1917

In 1906, he moved to Helsinki, Finland, where he continued his literary and journalist career. Much of his work was published anonymously in Estonia. He also advised local municipalities on land reform questions. In 1908, Päts moved to Ollila, which was located at the Russian border near Saint Petersburg. There he became one of the editors for the Estonian newspaper Peterburi Teataja ("The St Petersburg Gazette"), although he still resided in Finland. In Ollila, he was reunited with his family, with whom he had parted when he escaped to Switzerland in 1905.

After his wife had become seriously ill, Päts found out that he was no longer condemned to death in the Russian Empire. He moved back to Estonia in 1909, to face only minor charges. From February 1910, he served time in Kresty Prison in Saint Petersburg, while his wife died of tuberculosis in Switzerland, where Päts had sent her for treatment. During his imprisonment, he was able to study foreign languages and write articles, to be published in newspapers. Päts was released on 25 March 1911. The governor of the Governorate of Estonia complained about Päts's activity in Estonia in 1905 and pleaded for the government not to let him return. He was banned from living in the Governorates of Estonia and Livonia for six years. However, strong connections with Jaan Poska helped him return to Estonia, where he founded another newspaper, Tallinna Teataja ("The Tallinn Gazette").

From February 1916, Päts served as an officer in Tallinn. In July 1917, he was elected as Chairman of the Supreme Committee of Estonian Soldiers, where he actively worked to form Estonian units in the Imperial Army. During the war, he also organized the cooperation between Estonians and liberal Baltic German estate owners.

=== 1917–1918: Autonomy and German occupation ===
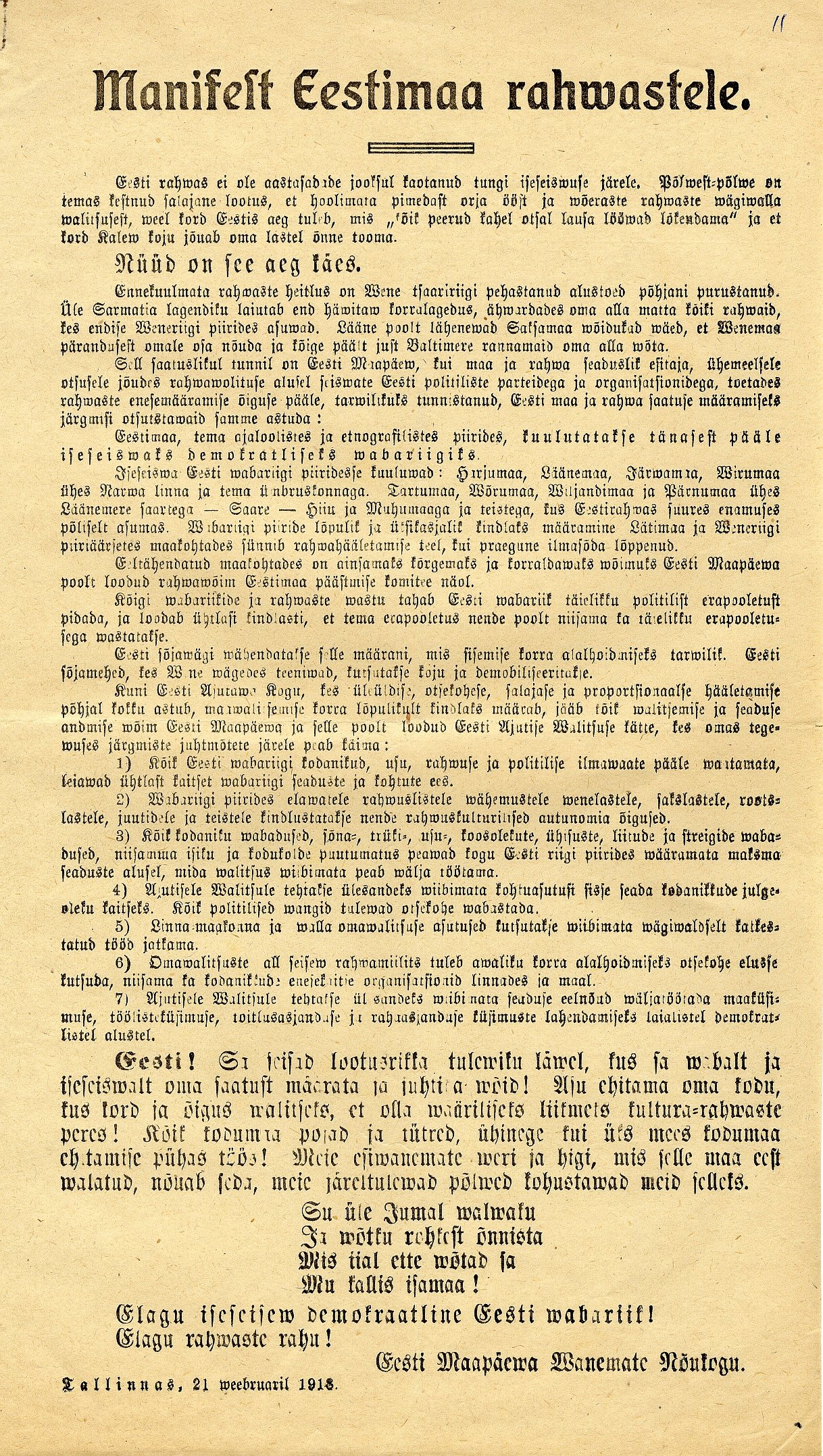
Konstantin Päts was one of the authors of the Estonian Declaration of Independence in February 1918.

In 1917, when German forces were advancing on Estonia, Päts was able to avoid the mobilization. Since the control after the February Revolution was in the hands of the Russian Provisional Government, Estonians were pursuing for an autonomy within the Russian Empire. In local debates on whether to form one or two autonomous governorates in Estonia, Konstantin Päts, who supported a single autonomous governorate, took yet another victory from Jaan Tõnisson, who supported two autonomous governorates. After Estonian mass protests in Petrograd, the provisional government formed the autonomous Governorate of Estonia on 12 April [O.S. 30 March] 1917.

The Estonian Provincial Assembly (Maapäev) was elected; Päts joined and became one of the leading figures of the Estonian Country People's Union, which took 13 of the 55 seats. Left- and right-wing politicians gained an equal number of seats in the Provincial Assembly, which made it difficult to appoint a speaker for the assembly. Jaan Tõnisson of the centre-right nominated the candidacy of Konstantin Päts, who, however, lost by only one vote to the almost unknown Artur Vallner. At first, Päts chose not to join any of the parliamentary groups, but eventually joined the most right-wing Democratic group. Päts replaced Jaan Raamot as chairman of the provincial government on 25 October [O.S. 12 October] 1917. During the October Revolution, Bolsheviks took control in Estonia and the Provincial Assembly was disbanded. After failing to give over official documents, Päts was arrested three times, until he finally went underground.

Since the Bolshevik rule in Estonia was relatively weak, the Council of Elders of the Maapäev declared on 28 November [O.S. 15 November] 1917 that the assembly was the only legally elected and constituted authority in Estonia. Since even the Council of Elders was too big to work underground, the three-membered Estonian Salvation Committee was formed on 19 February 1918; and Konstantin Päts became one of its members.

Soviet Russian forces evacuating, the Salvation Committee wanted to use the interregnum and declare Estonia's independence. On 21 February 1918, a delegation with Päts was sent to Haapsalu, which was chosen to be the site of the initial declaration, but they were forced to head back to Tallinn, since the German forces had captured Haapsalu on the very same day. Attempts to reach Tartu before the German occupation had also failed.

When the Soviet Russian forces had finally evacuated from Tallinn and the German forces were advancing, the Salvation Committee issued the Estonian Declaration of Independence on 24 February 1918 (the declaration had also been delivered to Pärnu, where it was proclaimed on 23 February). Instantly, the Estonian Provisional Government was formed; and Konstantin Päts became the Chairman of the Council of Ministers, the Minister of Internal Affairs, and the Minister of Commerce and Industry. The position of Minister of Commerce and Industry probably remained vacant in reality.

On 25 February 1918, the German forces captured Tallinn. Konstantin Päts was arrested on 16 June 1918. He was sent to several prison camps in Latvia, until he was finally placed in a camp in Grodno, Poland. He was released at the end of the war on 17 November 1918.

After the Deputy Chairman of the Council of Ministers Jüri Vilms mysteriously died in Finland, Jaan Poska led the underground republic. After Germany surrendered, Konstantin Päts's 2nd cabinet of the provisional government took office on 12 November 1918, making Päts the Prime Minister of the provisional government and the Minister of Internal Affairs.

After Päts arrived in Tallinn and the Maapäev had gathered, Päts's 3rd cabinet of the provisional government was formed on 27 November 1918, with Päts as Prime Minister of the provisional government and also the Minister of War, leaving it up to him to organize national defence. However, due to his multiple portfolios in the government, much of the work in the Ministry of War was delegated to higher officers.

=== 1918–1920: War of Independence ===
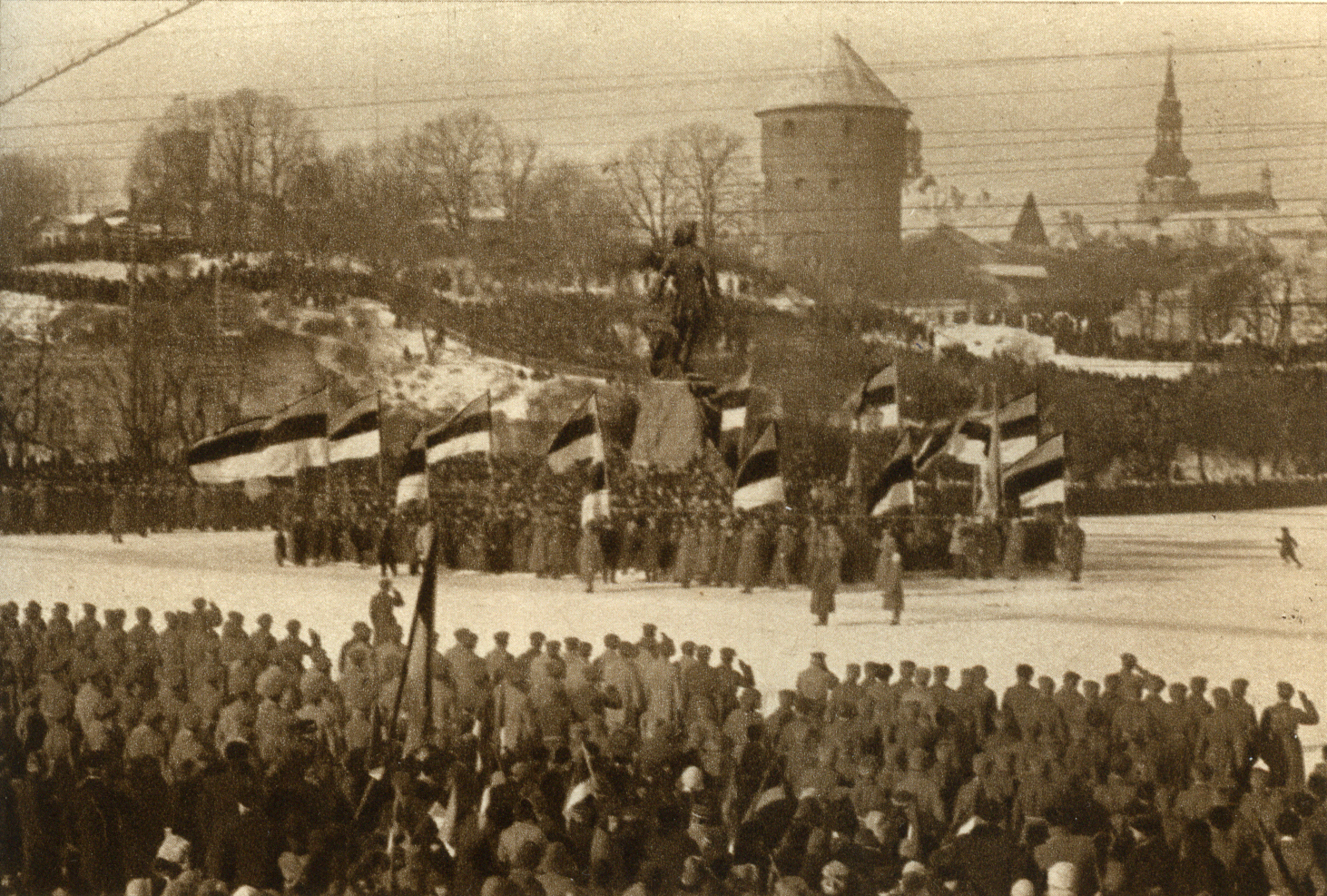
Päts gave the first traditional speech at the Independence Day parade on 24 February 1919.

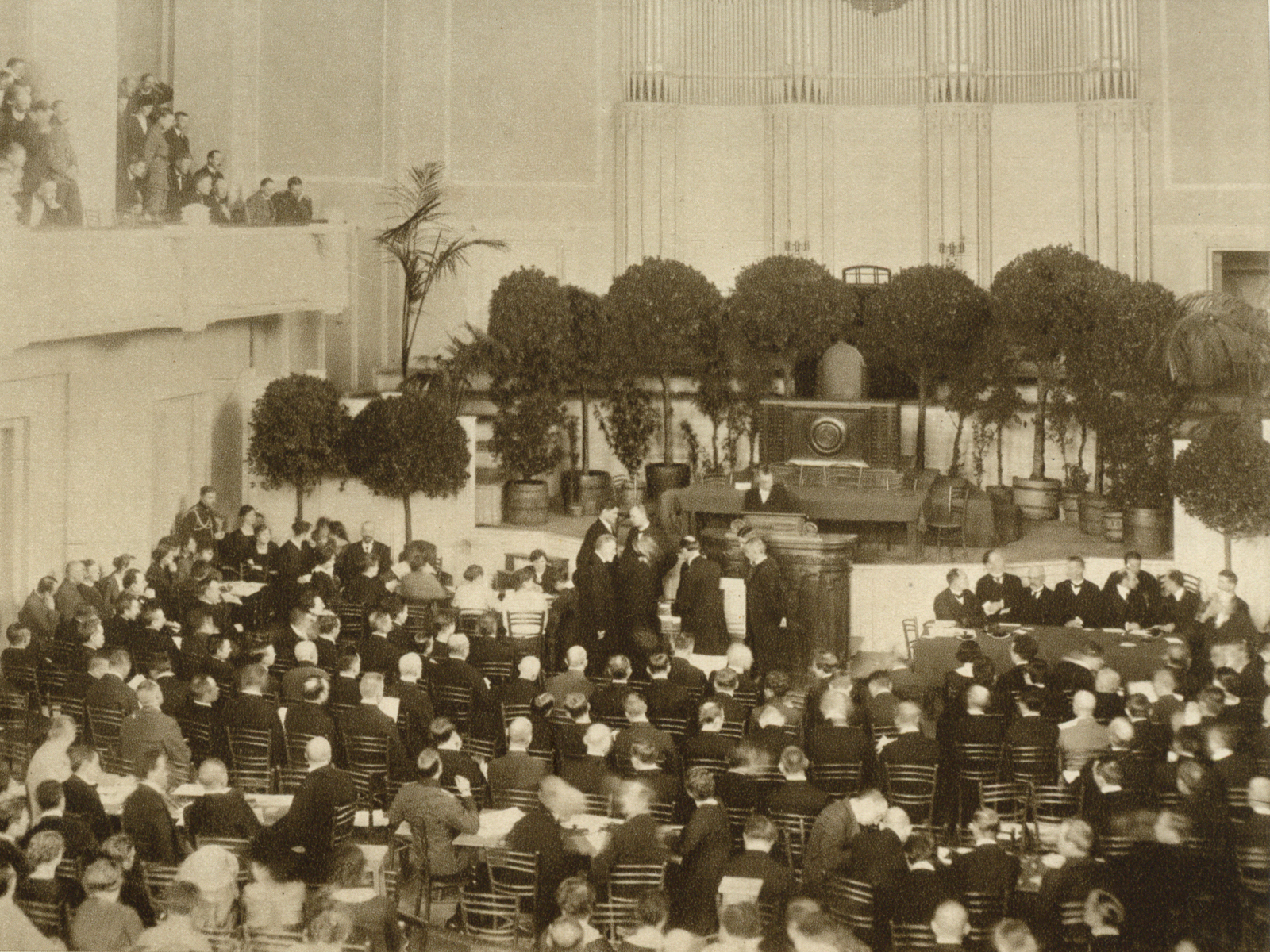
Weak representation in the leftist-dominated Constituent Assembly left Konstantin Päts with little power in composing the land reform law and the 1920 constitution.

On 28 November 1918, the Soviet Russian Red Army invaded Estonia and conquered the border city of Narva, marking the beginning of the Estonian War of Independence. By January 1919, Estonians had forced the Bolsheviks to retreat; and by 24 February 1919, the entire Estonian territory was under the control of the provisional government. In his speech at the 1919 Independence Day parade, Päts said: "We have to secure our economy so we could become less dependent on our allies. In order to avoid bankruptcy, our new state needs a solid foundation of agriculture."

In April 1919, the Estonian Constituent Assembly was elected, but the Estonian Country People's Union won only 8 of the 120 seats, leaving the majority to centre-left parties. On 9 May 1919, Otto August Strandman took over as the first Prime Minister. In the summer of 1919, Päts opposed the Estonian intervention into the war against the Baltic German Landeswehr in neighboring Latvia, but as he was in opposition and supported only by a small parliamentary minority, the then government decided to start the Landeswehr War, which ended in the Estonian-Latvian victory. After the war with Soviet Russia had also ended with Estonian victory on 2 February 1920, the majority left-wing Constituent Assembly adopted a radical land reform law and the first constitution, which brought about a proportionally representative and very fractured parliament, rapidly changing government cabinets, and a nominal head of state whose office had little more than ceremonial powers only.

=== 1918–1940: Independent Republic of Estonia ===
In September 1919, Päts formed a new political party, the agrarian-conservative Farmers' Assemblies, which was based on the Country People's Union. In 1920 elections, the party won 21 seats in the 100-member Riigikogu and from 25 January 1921 to 21 November 1922, Konstantin Päts was the State Elder and led the first constitutional government cabinet. It was a centre-right coalition with three centrist parties. The cabinet fell soon after the centre-left Estonian Labour Party left the coalition because of Päts's right-wing policies and criticism of corruption within the Bank of Estonia. After stepping down as head of government, Päts served as President (speaker) of the Riigikogu from 20 November 1922 to 7 June 1923.

In 1923 elections, Farmers' Assemblies took 23 seats. On 2 August 1923, Päts became State Elder for the second time. A similar centre-right coalition with three centrist parties lasted again until the Estonian Labour Party left the coalition, forcing Päts to step down on 26 March 1924. Otto August Strandman had openly criticized Päts for his role in corruption within the Bank of Estonia and economic policies that depended on trade with Russia. Päts kept away from office politics for seven years. Support for his party did not decline. From 15 December 1925 to 9 December 1927, Jaan Teemant of the Farmers' Assemblies was the State Elder.

In 1926 elections, Farmers' Assemblies took again 23 seats and Jaan Teemant continued as State Elder. Already in 1927, Päts criticized members of the Riigikogu, saying that they had been causing the instability of government coalitions, rather than ideological differences. At the 6th Congress of Farmers' Assemblies in 1929, the party was in opposition to August Rei's leftist government and Päts, among others, demanded changes in the constitution, a smaller parliament, a separate presidential office and fight against corruption.

In 1929 elections, Farmers' Assemblies took 24 seats and Päts served his third term as State Elder from 12 February 1931 to 19 February 1932. It was an ideologically wide coalition with the Estonian Socialist Workers' Party and the centre-right Estonian People's Party. On 26 January 1932, Farmers' Assemblies and the left wing-agrarian Settlers' Party merged to form the Union of Settlers and Smallholders, only to be followed by the formation of the National Centre Party by four centrist parties. Päts's cabinet resigned, making Jaan Teemant the new State Elder.

In 1932 elections the newly formed Union of Settlers and Smallholders won 42 seats in Riigikogu and one of the party's leaders, Karl August Einbund, became the State Elder. On 3 October 1932, the coalition between the Union of Settlers and Smallholders and National Centre Party broke up, with the latter wanting to devalue the Estonian kroon during the Great Depression. Päts himself was one of the key opponents of devaluation.

A month-long government crisis started. Since there were only three major parties in the parliament, the third being the Estonian Socialist Workers' Party, no functioning coalition could be found until special authority was given to Konstantin Päts to form a grand coalition between all three major parties. His cabinet took office on 1 November 1932. On 25 November 1932, Päts's government was given more powers by the disunited Riigikogu to deal with the economic crisis. His government was forced to resign on 18 May 1933, after the National Centre Party, still favouring devaluation, left the coalition and the Union of Settlers and Smallholders had lost many of its members to the reactivated Settlers' party. The succeeding Tõnisson's National Centre Party cabinet devalued the Estonian kroon by 35% on 27 June 1933. Although the devaluation proved to be successful and had a good impact to the economy later under his own rule, Päts never recognized his mistake by opposing the devaluation.

Lack of government stability led to several new constitution proposals, but only the third proposal by the right-wing populist Vaps Movement was accepted in a referendum on 14–16 October 1933. Päts was elected on 21 October 1933 to head the non-aligned transitional government to the second constitution. Until 24 January 1934, he served as State Elder, but after the new constitution came into force, he became prime minister. The new constitution was a drift from democracy, giving a lot of power to the head of state (still named "State Elder") and leaving the Riigikogu only an advisory role.

Both Päts and Tõnisson, his predecessor as head of state, tried to control the Vaps Movement that was seen by democratic parties as a local National Socialist party that had to be kept away from power. In August 1933, State Elder Jaan Tõnisson had declared a state of emergency and temporary censorship, that was lifted only when Päts's transitional government took office.

The weak government response only gained support for the Vaps Movement and in early January 1934, the movement won municipal elections in several urban municipalities. On 27 February 1934, Päts himself imposed a law, prohibiting members of the military to take part in politics. This action forced several thousand members of the army to secede from the Vaps Movement.

Päts was one of the candidates in the presidential elections that were supposed to be held in April 1934, but the Vaps Movement candidate Andres Larka and even lieutenant general Johan Laidoner were both clearly more popular candidates than Päts in the public opinion. The campaign was accompanied by threats by the Vaps Movement to take power and rumours of a forthcoming coup. In early March 1934, Päts's political opponent Jaan Tõnisson compared the Vaps Movement with the Nazis in Germany and advised the government to take necessary action against the movement. Konstantin Päts then carried out a self-coup on 12 March 1934. He was supported by general Johan Laidoner and the army.

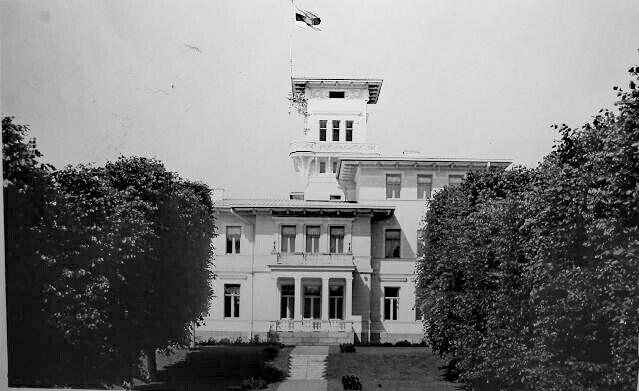
Oru palace in Toila was used as the head of state's summer residence by Päts. The buildings were destroyed in World War II.

A state of emergency was declared and the Vaps Movement was disbanded, with about 400 members arrested, including the presidential candidate Andres Larka. Johan Laidoner was reappointed Commander in Chief of the Army. The period following the self-coup in 1934–1938 has been called by some politicians and historians the "Era of silence" which was marked by some degree of authoritarianism by Päts.

Speaking in the parliament on 15 March 1934, Päts stated that the Estonian people were "blinded by the propaganda of the Vaps Movement and ill-minded because of it, and the power could therefore not be in the hands of the people". On 15–16 March 1934, the parliament (Riigikogu) approved Päts' actions in hopes of saving Estonian democracy. Päts postponed the presidential elections for the duration of the emergency, expressing concern about "emotions being too high because of anti-government agitation by the Vaps Movement".

In August 1934, Päts appointed Karl August Einbund as Minister of Internal Affairs, making him the third leading figure of the era next to Päts and Laidoner. In September, the Agitation and Propaganda Department was created, in October, all parliamentary work was suspended after the opposition criticized the political restrictions and in December, censorship was introduced.

In February 1935, the Patriotic League (Isamaaliit) was formed to replace political parties, while all other political organizations were suspended in March 1935. Päts stated in his opinions at the time that political organizations should unite the society, not fragment it. The initial state of emergency was declared for six months in March 1934, but after September 1934, Päts extended it for a year in a total of six times.

Päts believed that a nation should be organized not by political views into parties, but by vocation into respective chambers, and a series of state corporative institutions were thus introduced, following in big part the example of contemporary corporatism in Fascist Italy. Päts had promoted the idea of corporate chambers already in 1918, but the idea did not gain support from strong left-wing parties at the time. Päts was the main proponent of the formation of the chambers and the first two were founded while his government cabinets were in office in 1924 and 1931. Fifteen more chambers were established between 1934 and 1936, bringing the total number to 17.

On 7 December 1935, a coup d'état attempt (the "Estonia plot", named after the Estonia Theatre) by the Vaps Movement was exposed. More than 750 people were arrested throughout the state, crushing the movement conclusively. Leaders of the movement were soon given court sentences as hard as 20 years of forced labour, however they were all pardoned two years later, in December 1937.

Meanwhile, Jaan Tõnisson had criticized Päts's inability to bring the new constitution into effect. In July 1935, Tõnisson was ousted from the Postimees board. In October 1936, four former State Elders, Juhan Kukk, Ants Piip, Jaan Teemant and Jaan Tõnisson, sent a joint letter to Päts, demanding civil freedoms and restoration of democratic regime. Reluctance to restore democracy also caused student riots in Tartu in the autumn of 1936, which led to clashes with the police and disbandment of the student council of the University of Tartu.

The lack of organized opposition during the emergency made it easier for Päts to pass reforms. Päts ruled mostly through presidential decrees, because the Riigikogu was needed to pass real laws. The economy grew and the infrastructure, industry, and education were developed. The Estonianization of personal names was supported, the most prominent example being Minister of Internal Affairs Karl August Einbund, who changed his name to Kaarel Eenpalu.

Päts also signed a decree to bring the Supreme Court from Tartu to Tallinn in 1935, although all but one of the justices voted against it. After the coup, the Supreme Court lost many of its powers and was not able to observe the implementation of democratic principles in the country. Päts also founded the Tallinn Technical Institute on 15 September 1936 as the second university in Estonia. Losing the Supreme Court and some faculties in the university definitely reduced the importance of Tartu in Southern Estonia - the town that had historically been supportive to Päts's opponent Jaan Tõnisson.

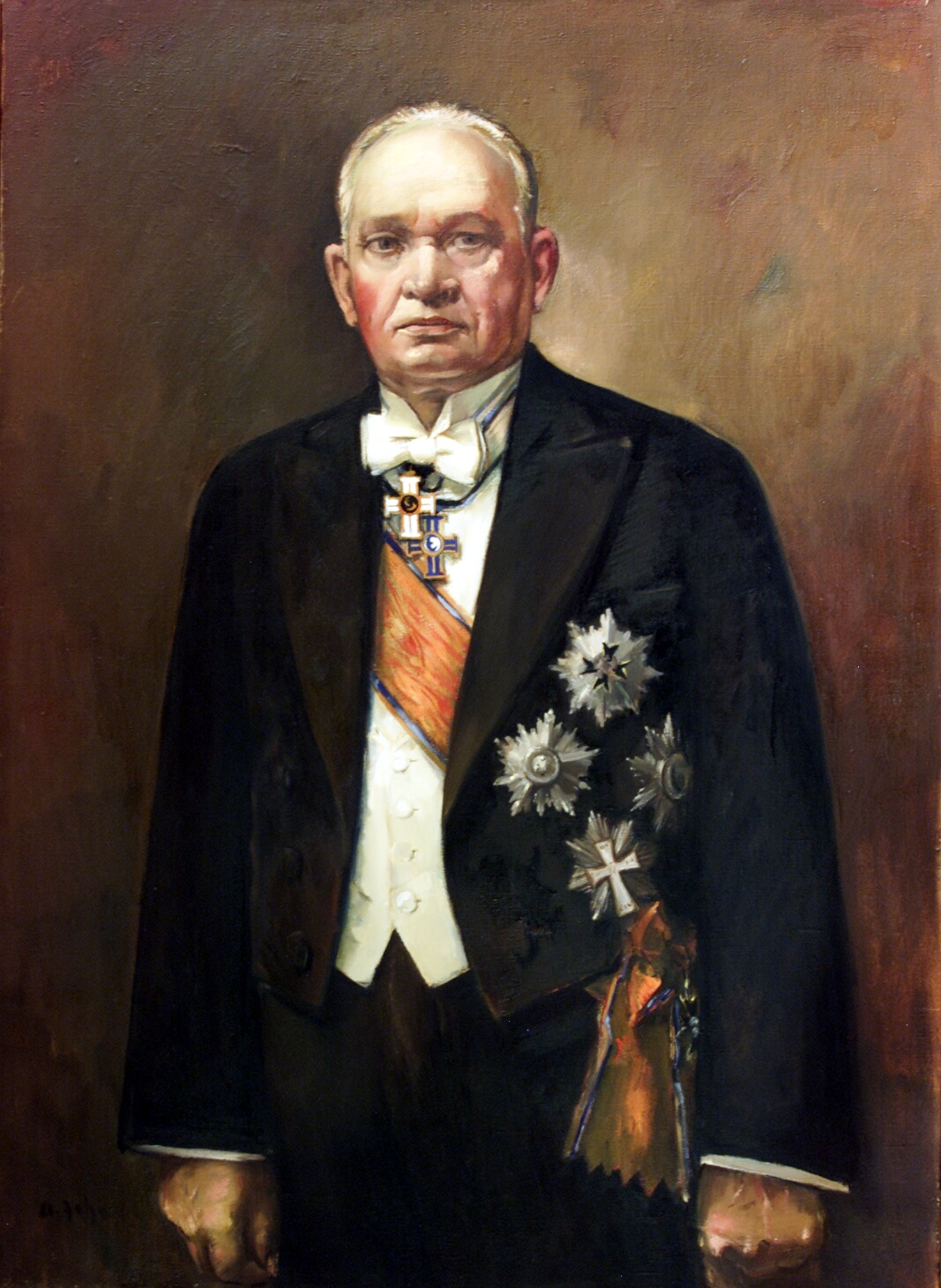
Man with Decorations. Portrait of Päts by Andrus Johani (1936)

Regarding the 1934 constitution as too authoritarian, Päts organised the passing of a new constitution through a referendum and a constituent assembly. The corporate chambers were to be the basis of forming the assembly. Its formation was approved (with 76% in favour) in a referendum in 1936. The 1936 National Assembly elections were boycotted by the opposition in most electoral districts.

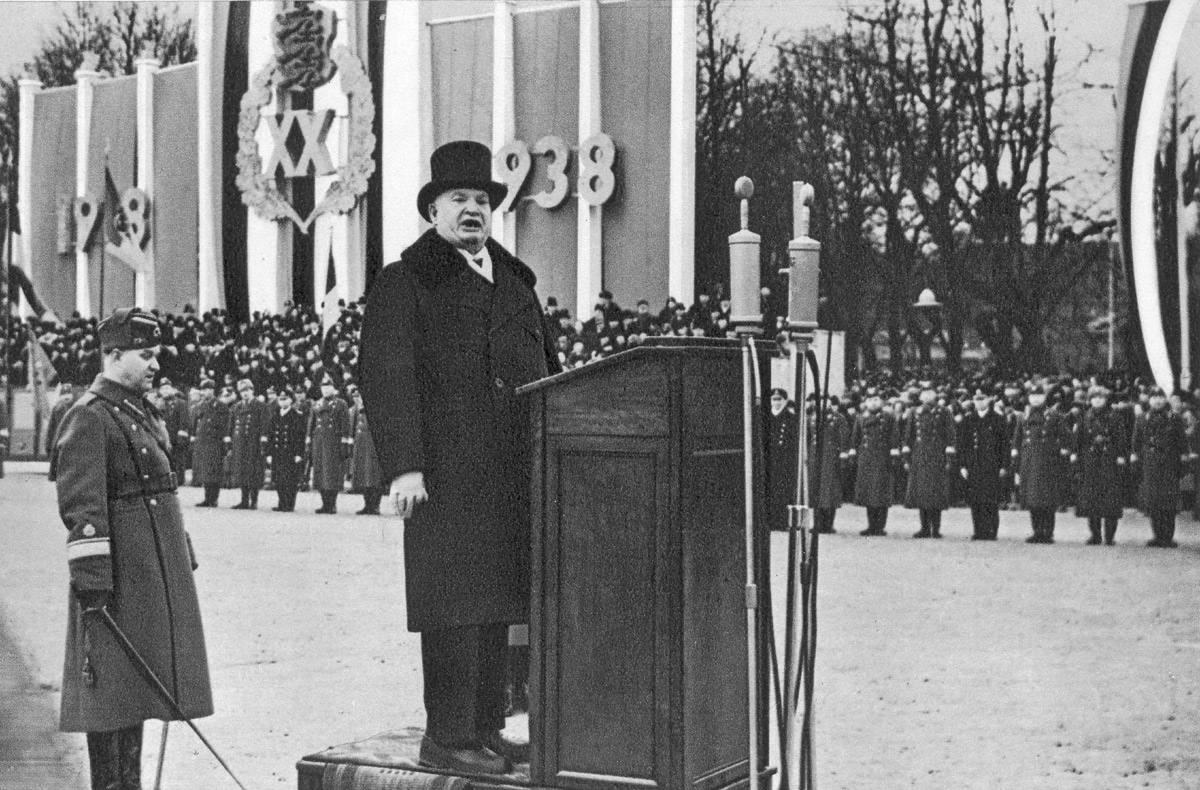
Päts giving a speech on the 20th anniversary of the Republic of Estonia at the Freedom Square, Tallinn (1938).

On 28 July 1937, the assembly adopted the third constitution, that was based on Päts's draft. A bicameral parliament was to be elected and the president was to be elected by the parliament, not by the people. On 3 September 1937, a 120-day period of transition began, during which Päts ruled as President-Regent.

On 1 January 1938, the new constitution came into force and the 1938 parliamentary elections were held. Opposition candidates were allowed to take part, however they were given little or no attention in the media. Päts's supporters in the National Front for the Implementation of the Constitution won 64 of the 80 seats in the lower chamber, the Riigivolikogu. The president, who was yet to be elected, was also able to directly appoint into office 10 of the 40 members of the higher chamber, Riiginõukogu.

On 23 April 1938, Konstantin Päts was elected and nominated a presidential candidate by both chambers of the parliament (Riigikogu) as well as by the Assembly of Municipal Representatives. Jaan Tõnisson was the only opposition candidate in the parliament's lower chamber (Riigivolikogu). Of its 80 members, 65 voted for Päts and 14 for Tõnisson. There were no opposition candidates, and no elections necessary, in the upper chamber (Riiginõukogu) and in the Assembly of Municipal Representatives, where Päts received 36 from a total of 40 and 113 from a total of 120 votes, respectively. As both chambers of parliament and the Assembly of Municipal Representatives had elected and nominated the same candidate, in accordance with the constitution, a collective electoral body convened on 24 April 1938 and voted with 219 in favor of the candidate, Päts, and 19 ballots left empty. From a total of 240, the 219 votes were more than the required 3/5 majority (144 votes). Päts gave the presidential oath of office in front of the parliament (Riigikogu) on the same day, 24 April 1938, thus becoming the first President of Estonia.

On 9 May 1938, Päts appointed Kaarel Eenpalu as prime minister. On 5 May 1938, all political prisoners, mostly communists and members of the Vaps Movement, were given amnesty. There is no consensus, whether the so-called "Era of Silence" ended in 1938 with the adoption of the new constitution, or in 1940 with the Soviet occupation. The era of 1934–1940 is generally also called the "Päts Era". Also in 1938 a general amnesty was granted for those political prisoners of the Vaps Movement and the Communist Party, who had not directly killed anyone.

=== 1939–1940: World War II, Soviet invasion of Estonia ===
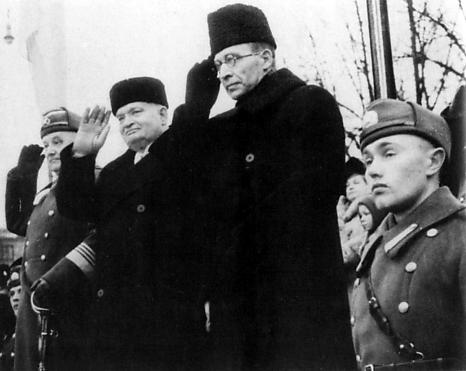
Estonia's leaders before the Soviet occupation, celebrating the country's Independence Day for the last time, on 24 February 1940. From left General Johan Laidoner, President Konstantin Päts and Prime Minister Jüri Uluots.

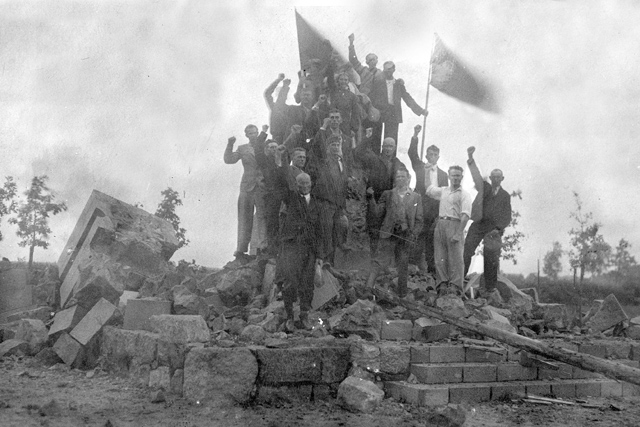
Destruction of Konstantin Päts' statue in Tahkuranna after the Soviet invasion in 1940.

After the beginning of World War II Estonia declared its neutrality, but was compelled to sign the Soviet–Estonian Mutual Assistance Treaty on 28 September 1939 to allow Soviet military bases and 25,000 troops in Estonia. On 12 October 1939, Päts appointed Jüri Uluots as a new, moderate Prime Minister.

In May 1940, Päts believed that the best option for Estonia would be to follow the Soviet leadership's (Stalin's) guidelines until the German-Soviet war. In case of such war, "Estonia would be saved". However, on 16 June 1940, the Soviet Union delivered an ultimatum to the Estonian government. The Estonian government was forced to accept the ultimatum and a full Soviet invasion and occupation of the entire territory of Estonia followed on 17 June 1940.

The Soviet invaders allowed Päts to stay in office, but he was forced already on 21 June 1940 to appoint a new pro-Soviet puppet government with Johannes Vares as prime minister. Päts became effectively a puppet himself, and over the following month he signed nearly 200 decrees issued by the new Stalinist regime. Amongst others, he signed a decree to change the electoral law, allowing the new regime to organize snap elections. This decree to change the law was unconstitutional, since the upper house of the Estonian parliament (Riigikogu) had been dissolved and never reconvened. The new Soviet-styled sham elections were held only for the lower chamber (Riigivolikogu), with voters being presented with a single list of Communists and fellow travellers. On Victory Day of 23 June 1940, Päts declared: "the greatest thing we have accomplished is the creation of the Estonian state. To her we have given our strongest love, our loyalty, our work, and our life." From 29 June 1940, Päts remained under permanent house arrest. Even in early July, Päts reportedly informed the German ambassador that he did not believe Estonia would be Sovietized. On 21 July 1940, the new pro-Stalinist "parliament" proclaimed Estonia a "Soviet Socialist Republic" and it is claimed that only then did Päts realize the essence of the Soviet occupation.

=== Deportation to Soviet Russia and imprisonment ===
On 21 July 1940, Päts sent his son Viktor to visit the United States' embassy in Tallinn, and to appeal for protection and asylum in the United States for himself and his family. The Acting US Secretary of State, Sumner Welles gave permission for issuing diplomatic visas to the entire Päts family already on the next day. Many Soviet-era sources claim that Päts had resigned from office on 21 July 1940. According to some other sources, he signed the resignation document on 22 July and the resignation was approved on 23 July 1940, making Päts formally the president of the new Estonian "Soviet Socialist Republic" for two days. Regardless of the exact chronology, the then pro-Soviet prime minister Vares, took over the president's powers as "Prime Minister in duties of the President" as a mere formality and for only a few weeks.

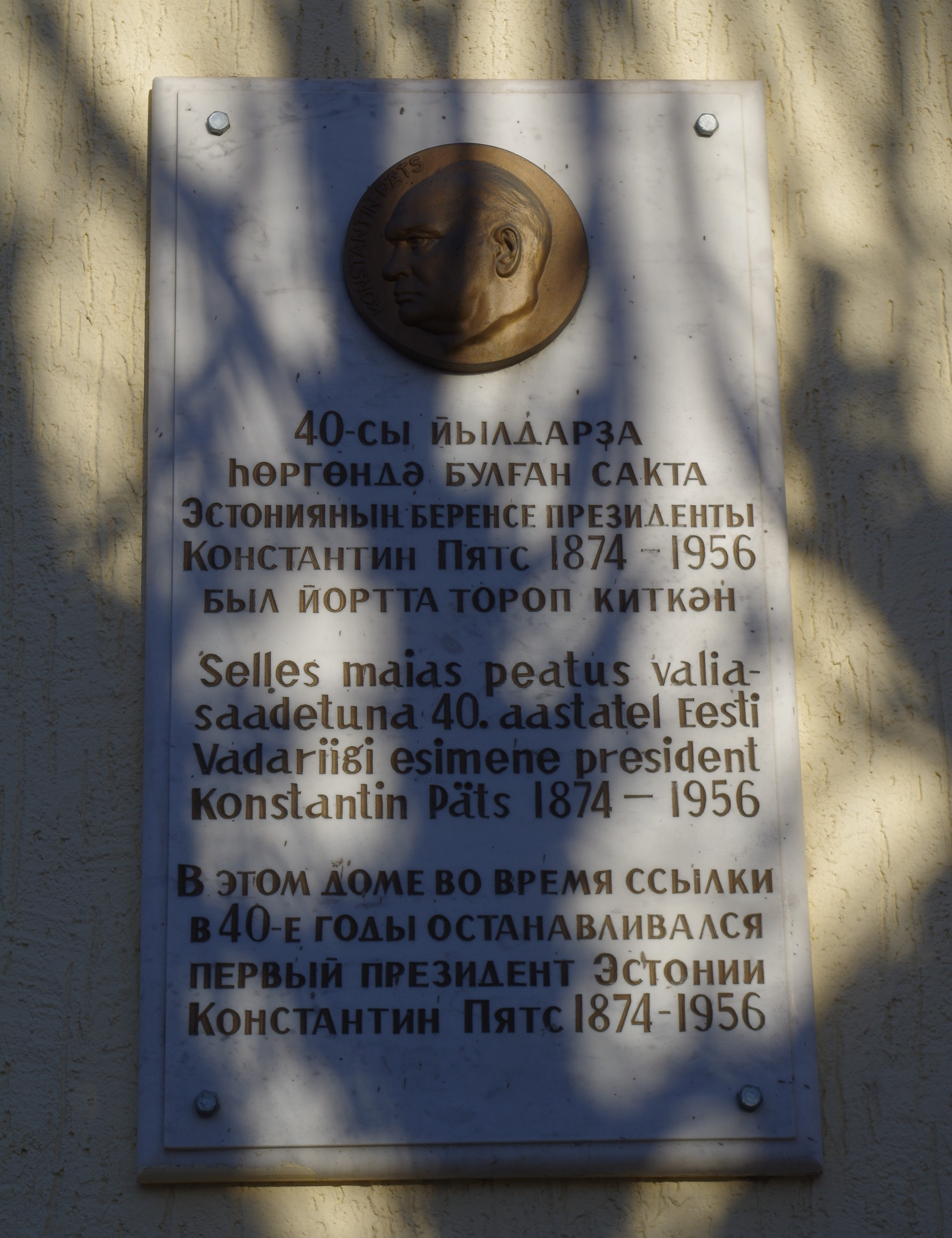
Memorial plaque in Ufa where Päts lived

Either the American visas came too late or the Päts family remained under house arrest, but on 30 July 1940, together with his son Viktor and Viktor's wife Helgi-Alice and sons Matti and Henn, Konstantin Päts was deported to Ufa, Russia, where they arrived on 9 August. There they lived under surveillance in a large apartment at 37 Komunisticheskaya Street for a year. In Ufa, Päts wrote his memoirs of his time in office and pleaded that his grandsons, their mother, and nanny would be sent to either Switzerland or Italy, since his grandson Henn was already in a bad health. After receiving no answer, he pleaded for them to be sent back to Estonia. In his naivety, he pleaded to be exchanged with Ernst Thälmann, former leader of the Communist Party of Germany, who was imprisoned in Germany. After that, Päts remained quiet, while his son Viktor was certain that Nazi Germany would invade the Soviet Union and that he would soon be living abroad.

The family "randomly" met an Estonian couple, both NKVD agents, in an Ufa market on 29 May 1941. They received an invitation to the family's home the next day. After the visit, it was claimed that both Konstantin and Viktor demonstrated particular viciousness against Joseph Stalin and Vyacheslav Molotov, sympathized with Germany, and announced that they were impatiently waiting for a German assault on the Soviet Union.

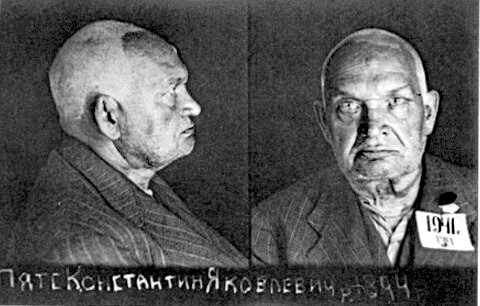
Konstantin Päts as a Soviet prisoner.

On 26 June 1941, they were arrested and imprisoned in Ufa, the children were sent to an orphanage. Päts was interrogated for hours, but did not take the blame. Even in March 1942, he believed that the Western powers would pressure the Soviet Union to send him abroad. Eventually, Päts and his son were sent to Butyrka prison in Moscow and Helgi-Alice to Gulag prison camps in Siberia. In Butyrka prison, Johan Laidoner was prisoner No. 11, Konstantin Päts No. 12 and Viktor No. 13.

On 24 March 1943, Päts was sent to forced treatment in psychoneurotic hospitals first in Kazan, then in Chistopol in Tatar ASSR. On 29 April 1952, Päts was found guilty according to § 58-14 and § 58-10 of the Penal Code, which meant counter-revolutionary sabotage and anti-Soviet and counter-revolutionary propaganda and agitation. Forced treatment was ended in 1954 and Päts was sent to a psychoneurology hospital in Jämejala, Estonia. Recognition by the locals and too much attention resulted in him being sent to Burashevo psychiatric hospital in Kalinin Oblast (now Tver Oblast), where he eventually died on 18 January 1956.

== Commercial and social activities ==
Between 1919 and 1933, Päts was chairman of the insurance company "Estonian Lloyd". From 1925 to 1929, Päts was chairman of the council of the Chamber of Commerce and Industry and continued as its honorary councillor from 1935. He also served as the chairman of the board of the Harju Bank and chairman of the Tallinn Exchange Committee.

Päts was among the founders of Estonian Sports Association Kalev in 1901 and also its first deputy chairman. Päts was the chairman of Estonian-Finnish-Hungarian Association from 1925 to 1936 and continued as honorary chairman from 1936. From 1927 to 1937, he was the chairman of the "Fenno-Ugria" foundation.

Päts received honorary doctorates from Tartu University in 1928, Tallinn Technical University and Andhra University (in India) in 1938, along with honorary membership of the Learned Estonian Society in 1938 and the Estonian Academy of Sciences in 1939. In 1938, he became honorary member of the Estonian Naturalists' Society and the Estonian Institute of Natural Resources. He was also named honorary alumnus of the student corps Fraternitas Estica and honorary citizen of the cities of Tallinn, Narva, Pärnu, and Tartu, as well as of his native Tahkuranna Parish.

== Foreign relations ==
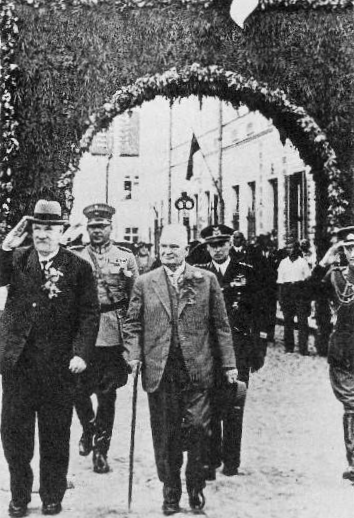
President of Finland Pehr Evind Svinhufvud and Konstantin Päts in Narva in 1936.

In 1918, Päts made an informal proposal for an Estonian-Finnish personal union. The contemporary leaders of independent Finland were not sufficiently interested in the union and the idea was effectively ignored and forgotten. Päts still bore the idea in his mind, as testified by his so-called "political testament", written in July 1940. In 1922, during his first term as State Elder, he made the first Estonian official state visit, to Finland. Päts championed "kindred friendship" with other Finno-Ugric nations, namely Finland and Hungary, and was on the board that wrote the statute of the World Congress of Finno-Ugric Peoples that was ratified on March 24, 1927. He also made unofficial visits to Finland in 1931, 1935 and 1937. President of Finland, Pehr Evind Svinhufvud visited Päts in Estonia twice, in 1934 and in 1936.

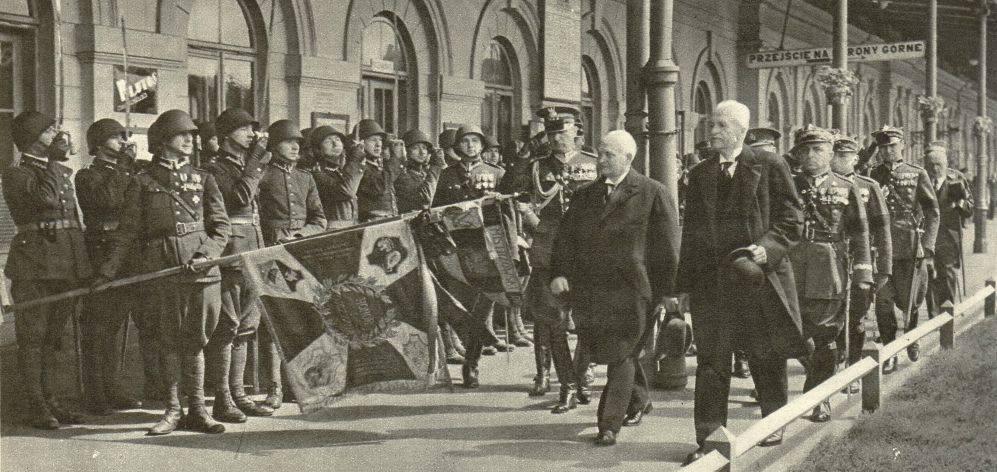
President Konstantin Päts visiting Polish president, Ignacy Mościcki, in 1935.

In 1933, Päts also made a state visit to Latvia and the treaty of Baltic Entente between Estonia, Latvia and Lithuania was signed in 1934. This agreement apparently was also another unsuccessful attempt to draw Finland closer to Estonia. During the 1930s, Estonian and Polish officials made several state visits to both countries.

In late 1930s, as the Stalinist Soviet Union took a more aggressive interest in the Baltic countries, Estonia attempted to move closer to Germany in its foreign policy. This change was marked by the 1936 appointment of Friedrich Akel (former foreign minister) as the Estonian ambassador to Germany On 3 December 1938, the Estonian government officially declared the country's neutrality in the event of any military conflicts in Europe.

== Criticism ==
Several aspects of Päts's career are still under critical public debate and various theories have been created, although many of them have also seen broad criticism. For example Päts economic activities and business contacts with Soviet Russia have drawn significant criticism. In 1920–1922 Estonia had more extensive relations with Soviet Russia than with other European countries. The Russian embassy in Tallinn was at the center of Russian gold sales to the West, which constituted about 4% of global gold sales in that period. Estonia and the Bank of Estonia received about 2/3 of the at least 30 million gold rubles transaction fees. The transactions were kept secret and mostly only the Director of the Bank of Estonia in 1920–1921 and Minister of Finance in 1921–1922, Georg Westel, and the State Elder in 1921–1922, Konstantin Päts, knew of these transactions.

Even more, it was the Harju Bank that belonged among others to Päts and Westel that transacted many of the gold sales. Päts, Westel and other big businessmen, mostly members of Päts's Farmers' Unions party, have thus been accused of using this transaction money for their own good. It has also been claimed that the Bank of Estonia gave out several loans to enterprises that were related to Päts's activities and almost all other loans were given to enterprises related to the members of the bank's own council and other top-level politicians. Having big loans was also the reason why Päts, Westel and other top-level politicians did not fight the hyperinflation at the time.

The gold exchange and big loans also boosted money circulation in Estonia, which created an illusion for the wider public that the economy of Estonia and the Estonian mark were in a good situation. It was only in December 1923 when former Prime Minister Otto Strandman of the Estonian Labour Party criticized the Minister of Finance Georg Vestel in the parliament for incorrect spending of state treasury. Westel was divested of office and Strandman's criticism led to the eventual resignation of Päts's 2nd cabinet in 1924 and led Päts to distance himself from public politics for seven years. Otto Strandman became Minister of Finance in 1924. He implemented his New Economic Policy (uus majanduspoliitika) of economic redevelopment, which stabilized the Estonian mark and detached the Estonian economy from dependence of trade with Russia. Dependence on Russia and hyperinflation could have affected the social situation in Estonia crucially, especially in the light of 1 December 1924 communist coup d'état attempt.

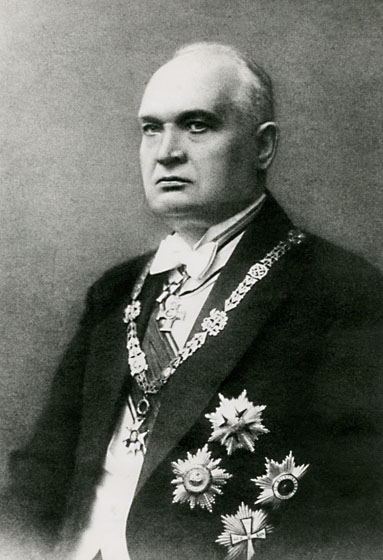
Päts in diplomatic uniform (c. 1936)

While Päts has been seen by some as a politician who "destroyed democracy" with the 1934 self-coup, many Estonians today understand the threat the Vaps Movement could have caused to democracy and internal and external security. Furthermore, the "coup" was initially recommended by Päts' political opponent Jaan Tõnisson himself, and was supported by the democratically elected parliament (Riigikogu). as well as the moderate wing of the Estonian Socialist Party.

According to some historians however, Päts and his close allies used the 1934 coup for their own personal gains and not to keep the Vaps Movement from taking power. Several members of the Päts family gained important positions ranging from clerical to cultural fields. Others have criticized the long time it took to adopt a new constitution, which was more than three years.

Päts was generally considered to be a rather "modest man" for a politician. He has been criticised for undue self-promotion: For example, during his own rule, he was awarded with several state decorations. He was nominated honorary citizen of some larger Estonian towns and some parishes. During the years of his presidency, the official state celebrations of the Estonian Independence Day began the day before, on Päts's birthday. Päts was also the first and only person in interwar Estonia, who had postage stamps with his picture made and circulated, starting from 1936.

In 1938, Päts created a labor camp in Harku for homeless people and other "asocials".

In 2017, a memorial to Päts was planned for the park on the south side of the Toompea Castle, but the country's president at the time, Kersti Kaljulaid, criticised the decision, saying:

While it is true that everyone's actions must be evaluated in the context of their time, I, too, am among those who believe that the Era of Silence had its role in things going as wrong for us as they did. When the circle of decision-makers becomes narrow, the politician no longer has a strong enough base and this is definitely a problem — it was a problem back then as well.

Päts' actions prior to, and around the time of, the 1940 Soviet invasion and occupation of Estonia have been questioned. Apparently, in 1918, Päts refused to compromise with the Soviet communists, but in 1940, he "handed over" Estonia to the same Soviet communists without many objections — this controversy has led to theories, that Päts was either a Soviet agent, a collaborator, took the Soviet invasion as inevitable or was just ill-minded and failed to deal with the situation.

One of the more prominent modern critics of Päts, Magnus Ilmjärv, has suggested that Soviet Russia sought since the 1920s to literally buy off some of the top-level Estonian politicians. He suggests that the Soviets saw Päts and his conservative Farmers' Assemblies party to be the most suitable. The easiest way to influence Päts and his party is said to have been the Estonian-Russian Chamber of Commerce. Päts was secretly very Russian-minded, as he grew up in a Russian-speaking home. Ilmjärv even claims that Päts had suggested federation between Estonia and the Soviet Union to the Soviet embassy in Tallinn.

Ilmjärv claims that Päts was against any "Baltic Union" that was propagated by the Estonian Minister of Foreign Affairs Kaarel Robert Pusta. Päts is even documented to have said to the Soviet ambassador that he was against politicians like Pusta and he desired to create a new constitution that would reduce the power of the Riigikogu. Through Päts, the Soviet Union is said to have gotten Pusta out of government cabinet and with him, also end the ideas of a united Baltic state.

It is also claimed that Päts purposefully gave up valuable information to the Soviets, when he negotiated the Estonian-Russian commerce treaty for Estonia. Päts also supported giving concession rights of the Narva River hydroelectric power plant to the German enterprise Siemens-Schuckert Werke that already had many projects in Russia and was influenced by it.

An Estonian oil syndicate became a joint Estonian-Soviet enterprise in 1928 and Päts was hired by it as a legal consultant in 1930. His annual salary was $4,000, which was twice as much as the State Elder earned and more than eight times as much as Päts earned as a member of parliament. The purpose of the joint enterprise for the Soviets was not supposed to be business-related, but only to attract Päts. This official salary by the Soviet Union has thus been seen as the salary for his long-term cooperation with the Soviets. After Päts's coup d'état, the Soviet Union increased economic cooperation with Estonian enterprises.

Other theories maintain that Päts trusted the Soviet officials and had befriended some of the Soviet leaders. It is also possible, that the NKVD controlled Päts's health or the information that reached him. Finnish historian Martti Turtola claims that Päts's actions were in accordance with the Soviet Union's demands already since the signing of the Soviet–Estonian Mutual Assistance Treaty on 28 September 1939 and he did not even once try to find more suitable compromises.

It is also suggested that Päts's bad health and loneliness did not let him realistically analyze the situation. Furthermore, it is suggested that Päts and his cabinet lacked the necessary knowledge in international affairs and the Molotov–Ribbentrop Pact of non-aggression between the Soviet Union and Nazi Germany may have come as a shock to the Päts cabinet.

Another theory suggests, that Päts knew of the outbreaking war between Nazi Germany and the Soviet Union and was only looking for a way for Estonia to survive the short period in between. It is suggested that Päts knew of the difficulty of the situation and tried to keep Estonians as safe as possible by avoiding war with the Soviets and buying time. While trying not to give the Soviet Union a chance to punish the Estonians, he also continuously postponed the mobilization, which eventually never even took place, unlike in Latvia and Lithuania in 1939–1940. Under international law a war would have invalidated the Tartu Peace Treaty. As a lawyer, he also had to understand that his decisions were not valid when forced by an occupying power.

== Legacy ==
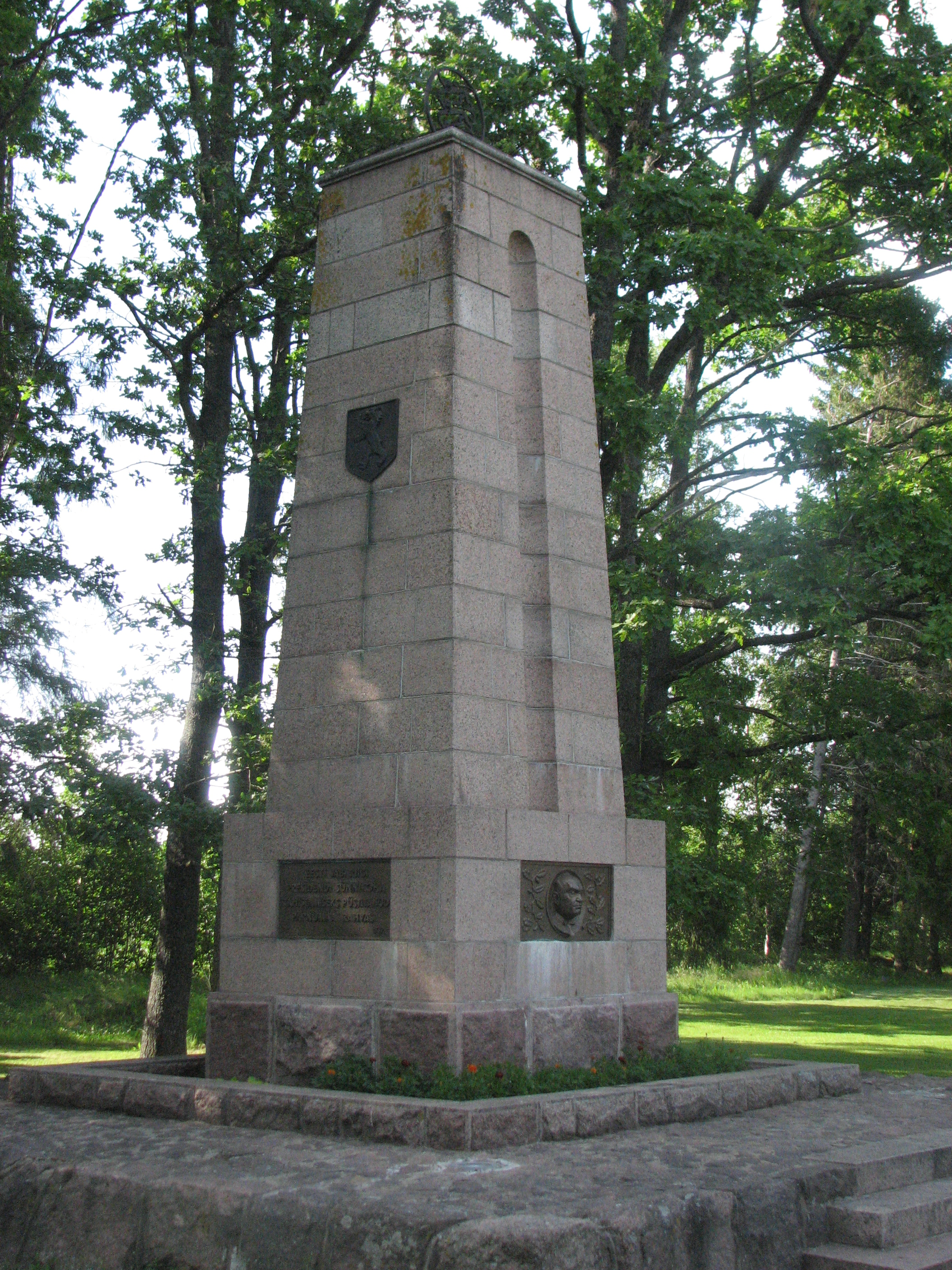
Memorial for Konstantin Päts in his birthplace Tahkuranna. Erected in 1939, it was removed by the Soviets in 1940. The memorial was restored in 1989, exactly fifty years after it was first erected.

Konstantin Päts was relatively successful in internal politics. After adopting the constitution, his party was in all the government cabinets, except for Friedrich Karl Akel's and August Rei's cabinets and Jaan Tõnisson's fourth cabinet. This makes it 4,017 days (89%) in the government (of 4,497 in 1921–1933). Päts was himself the State Elder four times, a total of 1,476 days (33%). He never filled any other position in the government besides the head of government (except for the additional minister portfolios in the provisional government).

Päts served as the chairman of the Farmers' Assemblies party only unofficially and he was considered to be a bad partisan and often formed the opposition within the party. Therefore, he seldom took part of their official meetings. Only in 1933, he was made honorary chairman of the party.

Membership in the parliament:

- 1917–1919 Estonian Provincial Assembly (Maapäev)
- 1919–1920 Estonian Constituent Assembly
- 1920–1923 I Riigikogu
- 1923–1926 II Riigikogu
- 1926–1929 III Riigikogu
- 1929–1932 IV Riigikogu
- 1932–1934/1937 V Riigikogu

Päts's ideology went through major changes during his career. During the 1905 Revolution, he was considered a socialist, as he advocated progressive ideas that were considered socialist at the time. During his exile years, he became more of a social liberal, trying to use the best of both ideologies. By the time Estonia became independent, he had become a conservative, and showed influences of statism during his authoritarian years.

Estonia's official position since the end of the Soviet era has been that Päts's actions were of no effect under both international law and the Estonian constitution from the beginning of the occupation, or at least from 21 June 1940, when Andrei Zhdanov forced him to appoint a puppet cabinet led by Johannes Vares. It further maintains the laws passed by the Vares cabinet and promulgated by Päts were void in any case as they were not ratified by the parliament's upper chamber, the National Council (Riiginõukogu), as required by the constitution. The National Council was dissolved soon after the occupation and was never reconvened. According to testimony from Rei, under the Estonian constitution, the Chamber of Deputies "had no legislative power" apart from the National Council.

Legally, Päts remained the de jure President until his death in 1956. From 1940 onward, his active duties went to the last pre-occupation Prime Minister Jüri Uluots, who let Otto Tief form a government in 1944, before the Soviet reoccupation. After Uluots died in Stockholm in 1945, presidential duties went to the oldest member of Tief's cabinet, August Rei, who formed the Estonian Government in Exile in 1953. The last Prime Minister in duties of the President, Heinrich Mark, handed over his credentials to the incoming President Lennart Georg Meri on 8 October 1992.

A number of places and institutions in Estonia have been named after Konstantin Päts. Kentmanni street in Tallinn was named after Konstantin Päts in 1939–1940 and 1941–1944 and Lossi street in Põltsamaa was named after him in 1936–1940. Konstantin Päts Boarding School of Tallinn was opened after Päts's own initiative for children with respiratory disorders. During Päts's presidency, he had the creamy "Staatspräsident Päts" rose cultivar named after him and the flowers are being grown in the Kadriorg Park in Tallinn, near the presidential palace.

A museum of Konstantin Päts was set up in 1991 in the Tallinn Botanical Gardens, where Päts's farmstead remains. The museum still exists, but the farmstead was returned to Päts's descendants in 1995.

Päts has been portrayed in literature; one of the best known is the satirical Memoirs of Ivan Orav by Andrus Kivirähk, where Päts is portrayed as a true people's person, who was beloved by the entire nation and who was a thoroughly good person. In the puppet political satire show Pehmed ja karvased Päts is portrayed as a talking bust sculpture that is placed in the cellar of a governmental building together with other former presidents. Periods of Päts's life as a side character were also portrayed in the television series Tuulepealne maa.

== Remains ==
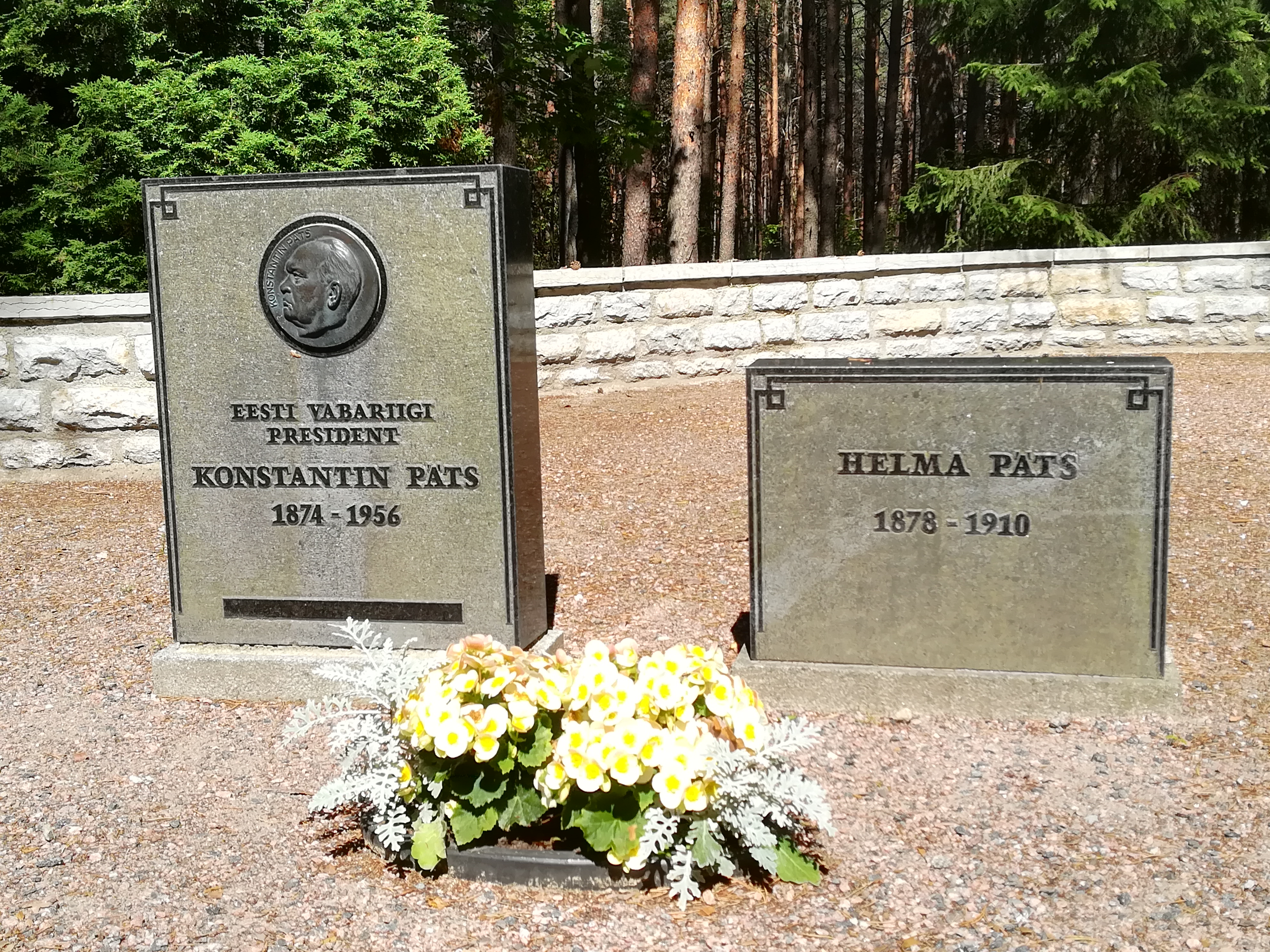
Konstantin and Helma Päts' graves in Tallinn's Metsakalmistu cemetery (2019)

In 1988, Estonians Henn Latt and Valdur Timusk decided to search for Konstantin Päts's remains in Russia. They reached the village of Burashevo, 15 km from Kalinin (now Tver), where Päts had been a patient in the hospital. They met his last doctor, Ksenya Gusseva, who described Päts's funeral in 1956. She said that Päts was buried like a president – in a coffin, unlike other deceased patients of the time. On 22 June 1990, his grave was dug up and the remains were reburied in Tallinn's Metsakalmistu cemetery on 21 October 1990. In 2011, a commemorative cross was placed in Burashevo, where Päts was once buried.

== Personal life ==
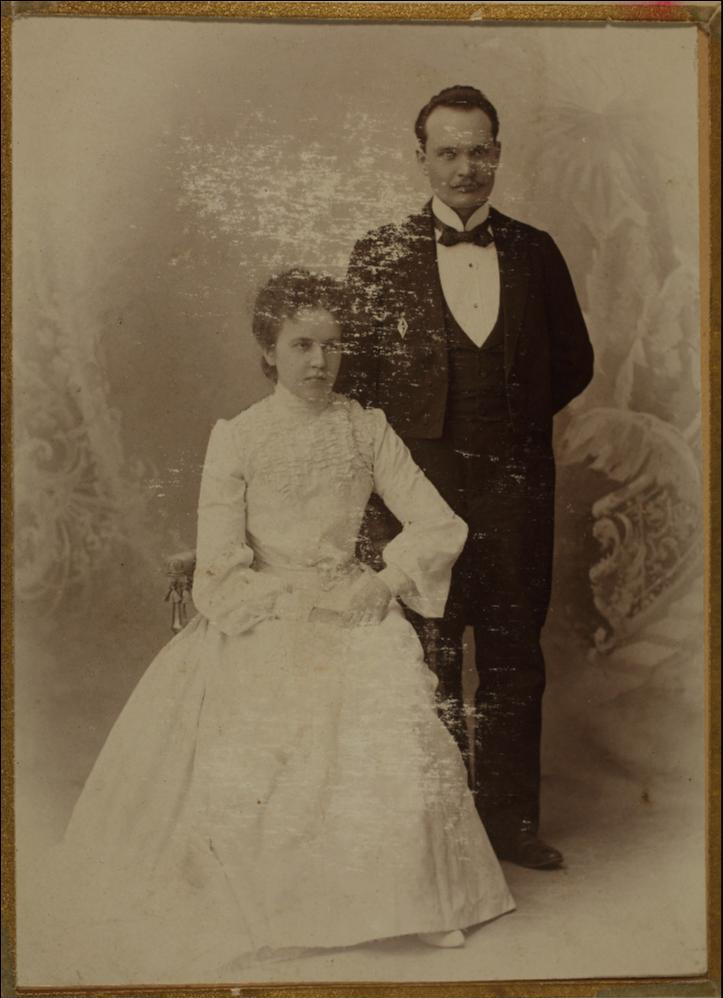
Konstantin Päts and his wife Helma.

In 1901, Konstantin Päts married Wilhelma ("Helma") Ida Emilie Peedi, whom he had met in Pärnu High School. They had two sons, Leo and Viktor. Konstantin left his family for exile in 1905; and his second son was born while he still resided in Switzerland. They were united when Konstantin moved to Ollila, Finland. His wife died of lung disease in 1910 while he was imprisoned in Saint Petersburg, and Päts never remarried. His children were raised by his wife's unmarried sister Johana (Johanna) Wilhelmine Alexsandra Peedi. Konstantin Päts also had at least one godson.

Päts was seen as a kind person, who was able to give good speeches and who had grown up in a rural area and therefore had a heart for the land. He took a special interest in issues related to children. He often donated money to large families and schools and organized events for students, which he also took part in. He was also known to take long walks in the morning in the Kadriorg park around the Presidential Palace and to get into conversations with park workers. Konstantin Päts had diabetes.

In 1919, Päts rented, organized, and later bought a farmstead on the land detached from Väo Manor, just outside Tallinn. He was later awarded a farmstead, like many other participants of and contributors to the Estonian War of Independence. His farmstead, however, was in Kloostrimetsa, in a prime location just outside Tallinn. Currently located within the Tallinn Botanic Garden, the farmstead has been returned to Päts's descendants.

== Descendants ==
Konstantin's eldest son, Leo Päts (1902–1988), managed to escape to Finland in 1939. He eventually moved on to Sweden, where he died in 1988. Konstantin's second son, Viktor Päts (1906–1952), died in Butyrka prison in Moscow on 4 March 1952. Viktor's sons Henn (Enn; 1936–1944) and Matti (b. 1933-2024) were sent to an orphanage in 1941 but were soon separated. They were united once a week, until Henn died of starvation in Matti's arms in 1944.

All living descendants of Konstantin Päts are the children and grandchildren of Matti Päts, who returned from Russia with his mother Helgi-Alice in 1946. Helgi-Alice, however, was arrested again in 1950 and sentenced to 10 years in prison in Kazakh SSR and returned in 1955. Matti Päts has been the director of the Estonian Patent Office since 1991; he has also been a member of the Riigikogu and Tallinn city council. He was even seen as a potential candidate for the 2001 Presidential election by the conservative wing of the Pro Patria Union.

== Awards ==
- 1920 – Cross of Liberty I/I
- 1920 – Cross of Liberty III/I
- 1921 – Order of the Estonian Red Cross III
- 1925 – Order of Bishop Platon I
- 1926 – Order of the Estonian Red Cross I/I
- 1928 – Order of the Three Stars, 1st Class with Collar (Latvia, 17 Nov 1928)
- 1929 – Order of the Cross of the Eagle I
- 1935 – Order of the Three Stars, 1st Class
- 1936 - Order of Vasa, Grand Cross (Sweden)
- 1938 – Special sash of the Order of the National Coat of Arms
- 1938 – Collar of the Order of the White Star
- 1938 – Collar of the Order of the National Coat of Arms

== Bibliography ==
- Päts, Konstantin; Karjahärm, Toomas (1999). Eesti riik I. Eesti mõttelugu. Tartu: Ilmamaa. ISBN 9985-878-26-4.
- Päts, Konstantin; Karjahärm, Toomas (2001). Eesti riik II. Eesti mõttelugu. Tartu: Ilmamaa. ISBN 9985-77-009-9.

== See also ==
- Estonian War of Independence
- Occupation of Baltic states
- Kaarel Eenpalu
- Johan Laidoner
- Jaan Teemant
- Antanas Smetona
- Kārlis Ulmanis
- European interwar dictatorships

== Notes ==
Government offices
Preceded by None; Independence declared	Chairman of the Council of Ministers of the Provisional Government of Estonia; 1918	Succeeded by Himself; Prime Minister of the Provisional Government
Preceded by Himself; Chairman of the Council of Ministers of the Provisional Government	Prime Minister of the Provisional Government of Estonia; 1918–1919	Succeeded by Otto August Strandmann; Prime Minister
Preceded by Ants Piip	State Elder of Estonia; 1921–1922	Succeeded by Juhan Kukk
Preceded by Juhan Kukk	State Elder of Estonia; 1923–1924	Succeeded by Friedrich Karl Akel
Preceded by Otto August Strandmann	State Elder of Estonia; 1931–1932	Succeeded by Jaan Teemant
Preceded by Karl August Einbund	State Elder of Estonia; 1932–1933	Succeeded by Jaan Tõnisson
Preceded by Jaan Tõnisson	State Elder of Estonia; 1933–1934	Succeeded by Himself; Prime Minister in duties of the State Elder
Preceded by Himself; State Elder	Prime Minister in duties of the State Elder of Estonia; 1934–1937	Succeeded by Himself; President-Regent
Preceded by Himself; Prime Minister in duties of the State Elder	President-Regent of Estonia; 1937–1938	Succeeded by Himself; President
Preceded by Himself; Prime Minister in duties of the State Elder	President-Regent of Estonia; 1937–1938	Succeeded by Kaarel Eenpalu; Deputy Prime Minister
Preceded by Himself; President-Regent	President of Estonia; 1938–1940	Succeeded by Jüri Uluots; Prime Minister in duties of the President
Government offices
Preceded by None; Independence declared	Minister of Internal Affairs of Estonia; 1918	Succeeded by August Peet
Preceded by Andres Larka	Minister of War of Estonia; 1918–1919	Succeeded by Otto August Strandmann
Political offices
Preceded by Jaan Raamot	Chairman of the Provincial Government of the Governorate of Estonia; 1917–1918	Succeeded by None; Independence declared
Preceded by Juhan Kukk	President of the Riigikogu; 1922–1923	Succeeded by Jaan Tõnisson
