= Karl Treufeldt =

Estonian communist

Karl Treufeldt (1893-1939, pseudonym K. Dixi) was an Estonian revolutionary and proletarian publicist. He was a revolutionary organizer during the Commune of the Working People of Estonia 1918-1919, leading the Red Guards in Haapsalu. After the defeat of the Commune, he was active in Estonian-language publishing activities in Soviet Russia.

== Youth ==
Treufeldt was born in Valga on 21 July [O.S. 9 July] 1893. His father was a carpenter. The young Treufeldt joined the Russian Social Democratic Labour Party in 1912. In the same year, he was arrested during the 1912 strike movement. Treufeldt managed to leave Russia through help of comrades. He spent the following years abroad, and worked as a sailor until mid-1917 - visiting Great Britain, Germany, France, Portugal, Italy and the United States. In 1917 he returned to Russia to participate in the revolutionary movement. Upon his return, he helped organize the Tallinn Workers Theatre.

== Revolution ==
In November 1917, the Executive Committee of the Estonian Soviet of Workers and Soldiers Deputies sent him to Haapsalu to lead the establishment of soviet power in the town and surrounding county. He organized Haapsalu Red Guards, served as the chairman of the Lääne County Workers Soviet Executive Committee and the Haapsalu revolutionary tribunal during the Commune of the Working People of Estonia of 1918-1919. Treufeldt edited the publications Eesti Kütiväe Teataja ('Estonian Army Journal') and Tööline ('Worker').

== Publishing activities in Soviet Russia ==
After the defeat of the revolution in Estonia, Treufeldt managed to escape to Soviet Russia. Treufeldt wrote under the pseudonym K. Dixi. He served as editor of the Leningrad publication Edasi ('Forward') and the Omsk publication Siberi Tööline ('Siberian Worker'). He worked at the Pechatny Dvor publishing house in Leningrad. He translated fictional and political works from Russian language to Estonian, and published a variety of short stories, theatre plays, political and cultural articles. He worked on the magazine Oras along with Hans Pöögelmann and Valter Klein.

== Death ==
He died on 27 November 1939, a victim of the purge. He was posthumously rehabilitated.
