= Corporate chambers (Estonia) =

Corporate institutions in Estonia

Corporate chambers (Estonian: kutsekojad, singular kutsekoda, lit. 'vocational chamber') were a series of corporate institutions in Estonia during the interwar period. The first of these – the Chamber of Commerce and Industry – was created in 1924, and the second, the Chamber of Agriculture, followed in 1931. However, most of the chambers were established after the 1934 coup d'état of Konstantin Päts, and the Era of Silence which followed the coup became their heyday.

The main proponent of the formation of the chambers was indeed Päts – according to his political views, a nation should be organized not by political views into parties, but by vocation into respective chambers. Päts had promoted the idea of corporate chambers already in 1918, shortly after the Republic of Estonia had been established, but the idea did not gain support at the time. Both of the earlier chambers were however formed during time when Päts was head of government (riigivanem). After the 1934 coup Päts established a moderate authoritarian regime, in which corporate chambers were deemed to play an important role. A corporative system, based on the example of Fascist Italy, was to replace the inherently unstable multi-party system. Fifteen more chambers were established between 1934 and 1936, bringing the total number to 17. The chambers also took part in legislative work – according to the 1937 constitution, 16 out of 40 seats in the upper chamber of the parliament (Riiginõukogu) were allocated to them.

All the corporate chambers were disbanded between 13 and 31 July 1940, about a month after the Soviet Union occupied Estonia.

== List of chambers ==
- Chamber of Agricultural Workmen and Small Landowners (Estonian: Maatööliste ja Väikemaapidajate Koda) was an Estonian vocational self-government during the years 1936–1940. The Chamber had 36 elective and 4 appointed (by the Minister of Agriculture) members. Chairman was Helmut Maandi, since 21 February 1940 Juhan Post.
- Chamber of Agriculture
- Chamber of Agronomes (Estonian: Agronoomide Koda) was a vocational self-government of Estonian agronomists during the years 1935–1940. Chairman was Kaarel Liidak, since 26 January 1940 Ants Käspre. Every Estonian practicing agronomist had member rights of the Chamber. Council of the Chamber had 25 elective members.
- Chamber of Commerce and Industry
- Chamber of Co-operation (Estonian: Ühistegevuskoda) was an Estonian vocational self-government institution that existed from 1936 to 1940 with 60 elective members. It was established by a decree of 22 November 1935. The chairman was Aleksander Kask.
- Chamber of Dairy-masters (Estonian: Meierite koda) was an Estonian vocational self-government during the years 1936–1940. The Council of the Chamber had 25 elective members.
- Chamber of Engineering
- Chamber of Fishery (Estonian: Kalanduskoda) was a vocational self-government of Estonian fishers during the years 1936–1940. Chairman was Mart Laagus. ouncil of the Chamber was composed of 35 elective and 5 appointed (by the Minister of Agriculture) members.
- Chamber of Handicraft (Estonian: Käsitööstuskoda) was a vocational self-government of Estonian artisans during the years 1936–1940. Chairman was Aleksander Naeres. The Chamber had 77 elective members.
- Chamber of Homeowners
- Chamber of Household (Estonian: Kodumajanduskoda) was an Estonian vocational self-government during the years 1936–1940. The Chamber had 50 elective members. Chairwoman was Linda Eenpalu.
- Chamber of Pharmacists (Estonian: Rohuteadlaste Koda) was a vocational self-government of Estonian pharmacists. Every Estonian practicing pharmacist had member rights of the Chamber. Council of the Chamber was composed of 20 elective members. Chairman was Karl Jürison.
- Chamber of Physicians (Estonian: Arstide Koda) was a vocational self-government of Estonian physicians during the years 1935–1940. Every practicing Estonian physician (928 in the year 1935) had member rights of the Chamber. The Council of the Chamber had 30 elective members. Adalbert Lübeck was the chairman.
- Chamber of Private Employees (Estonian: Eraettevõtete Ametnikkude Koda) was an Estonian vocational self-government during the years 1937–1940. Chairman was Aleksander Oinas. The Chamber was composed of 48 elective members.
- Chamber of Teachers
- Chamber of Veterinary Surgeons (Estonian: Loomaarstide Koda) was a vocational self-government of Estonian veterinarians during the years 1935–1940. Chairman was August Arras, since 1939 August Mõttus. Every practicing Estonian veterinarian (186 in 1938) had member rights of the Chamber. Council of the Chamber had 25 elective members.
- Chamber of Workers (Estonian: Tööliskoda) was a vocational self-government of Estonian workers during the years 1936–1940. Chairman was Johannes Kurvits. The Chamber was composed of 30 elective members.
