= Voldemar Päts =

Estonian artist, art teacher, and politician

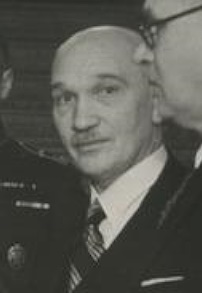
Päts in 1936

Voldemar Päts (19 July 1878, Tahkuranna – 27 June 1958, Toronto) was an Estonian artist, art teacher and politician. He was the younger brother of statesman and 1st President of Estonia Konstantin Päts. He was a member of Estonian Constituent Assembly.
