= President-Regent =

Political position in Estonia in 1930s

Riigihoidja (Estonian "Caretaker of State", sometimes translated as President-Regent) was the name of the office of the head of state and head of the caretaker government of Estonia from 3 September 1937 to 24 April 1938. The first person to hold this position was Konstantin Päts, five time former State Elder. His eventual successor ex officio was Johan Laidoner, then Commander-in-Chief.

According to the Constitution of the Republic of Estonia Amendment Act (1933), which was approved by the people upon the October 1933 Estonian constitutional referendum (Note: (Riigi Teataja (State Gazette) 28 October 1933 No. 86 Article 628)) and entered into force (on the 100th day after the referendum) on 24 January 1934, the Elder of State was the representative of the people who executed the highest administrative power in the State. For governing the State, there was by the Elder of State the Government of the Republic (Section 57) appointed by the Elder of State and chaired by the Prime Minister (Section 64). By the Resolution No. 173 from 12 March 1934 (Riigi Teataja (State Gazette) 16 March 1934 No. 22 Art 56), Konstantin Päts extended validity of martial law to the whole territory of state for 6 months, which was later prolonged. During the martial law, the elections of the Elder of State were not organised and Konstantin Päts as the acting Prime Minister also acted as the caretaker Elder of State.

In accordance with the Period of Transition Act, which was proclaimed on 17 August 1937 by Konstantin Päts as Prime Minister in duties of the Elder of State, and entered into force on 3 September 1937 after publication in the Riigi Teataja (3 September 1937 nr 71 art 598) the Prime Minister continued to fulfil his duties in the official status of the Protector of State in duties of the Elder of State until the new Riigikogu had been convened.

He was also his own successor as first president from 24 April 1938 until 23 July 1940, formally until shortly after Soviet troops had occupied Estonia in June 1940.

Portrait	Name	Term of office			Political party	Cabinet	Riigikogu (election)	Separate head of state
Portrait	Name	Took office	Left office	Days	Political party	Cabinet	Riigikogu (election)	Separate head of state
The Amendment Act of the 1938 Constitution temporarily merged the offices of State Elder and Prime Minister into President-Regent.
	Konstantin Päts (1874–1956); President-Regent	3 September 1937	24 April 1938	234	None (Note: Was member of the Patriotic League which was the only sanctioned political organization, but which cannot be considered a political party per se.)	Päts V non-party coalition (Note: Although Konstantin Päts resigned as President-Regent on 24 April 1938 to become the President on the same day, his cabinet remained temporarily in office until 9 May 1938, headed by acting Prime Minister Kaarel Eenpalu.)	Parliament disbanded (Note: The "Era of Silence" began on with Päts' self-coup on 21 March 1934. The Riigikogu approved of the coup retroactively on 15 March 1934. The Riigikogu was thereafter not convened after 2 October 1934. It was officially disbanded on 1 October 1938.)	None
The 1938 Constitution divided the office of President-Regent between a President and a Prime Minister.
