= Teataja =

Estonian newspaper

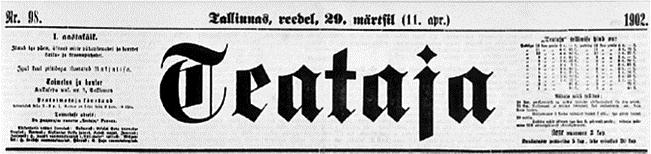
- Headline in 1901
- Type: daily newspaper
- Publisher: Konstantin Päts
- Editor-in-chief: Konstantin Päts, Mihkel Pung
- Founded: 1901-1905
- Language: Estonian
- Circulation: 5500-8750

Teataja (The Herald) was an Estonian-language daily newspaper published from 1901 to 1905 in Tallinn (German: Reval), Estonia (then part of the former Russian Empire).

The politically leftist ("social democratic") newspaper was founded in 1901 by Konstantin Päts and Eduard Vilde. Its editors included Päts, Mihkel Martna, Hans Pöögelmann, Mihkel Pung, Otto Münther, Johannes Voldemar Veski, and A. H. Tammsaare.
