= Andrus Johani =

Estonian painter

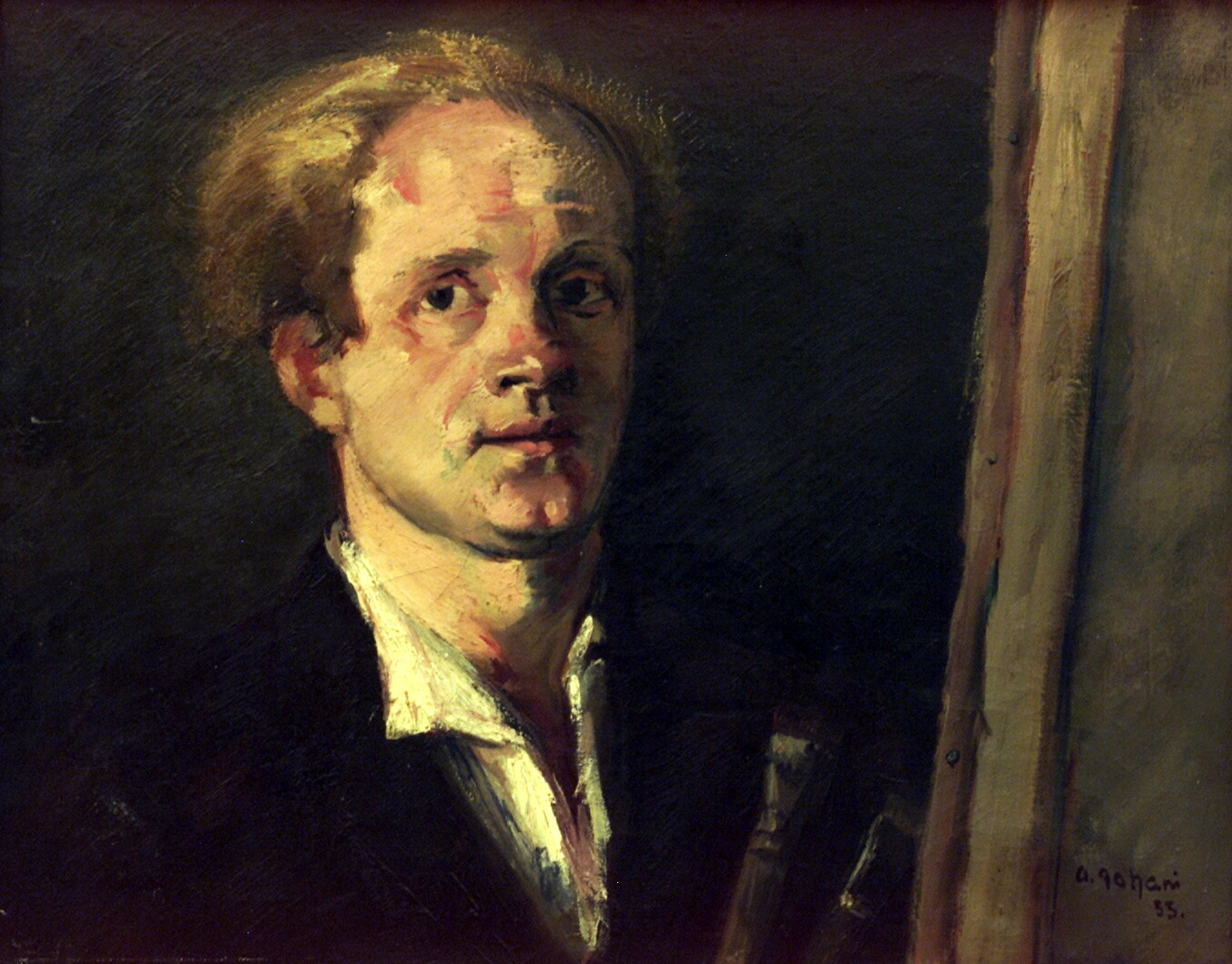
- Born: 1 September 1906; Tallinn, Governorate of Estonia, Russian Empire
- Died: 18 August 1943 (aged 36); Tartu, German-occupied Estonia
- Occupation: Painter

Andrus Johani (1 September 1906 – 18 August 1941) was an Estonian painter.

Johani was born in Tallinn and came of age as an artist with his friend Kaarel Liimand. They both painted and sketched scenes of daily life and traveled to the European art centers together, most notably Paris in 1937.

In 1933 he married the librarian Helene Johani, who later served as a director of the National Library of Estonia during the Soviet occupation (then named the State Library of the Estonian SSR).

He served in the defense of Tartu during WWII. He was taken prisoner by the Germans, and executed in the Tartu prison.

== Gallery ==
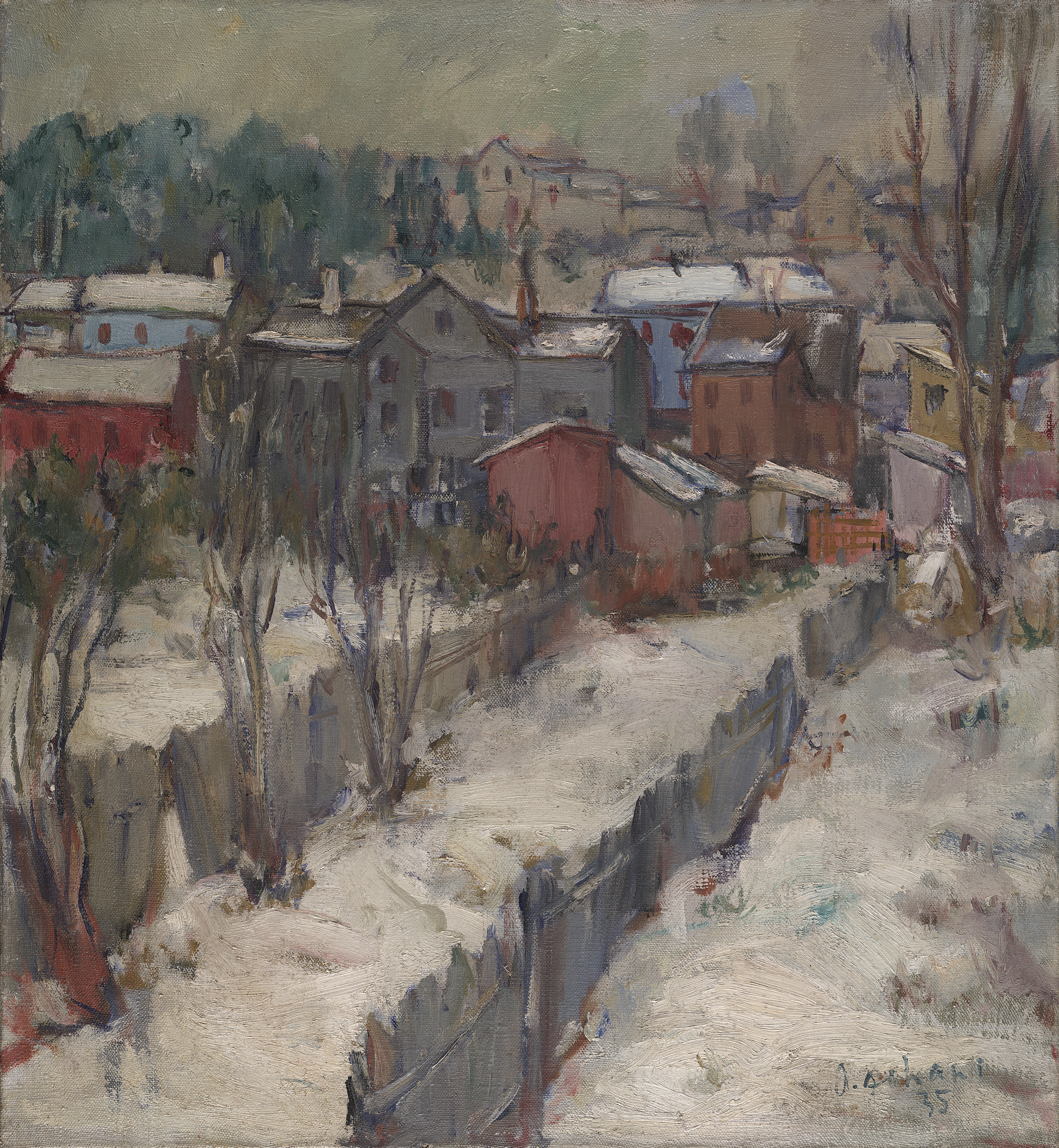
"Tartu äärelinnas" (1935)

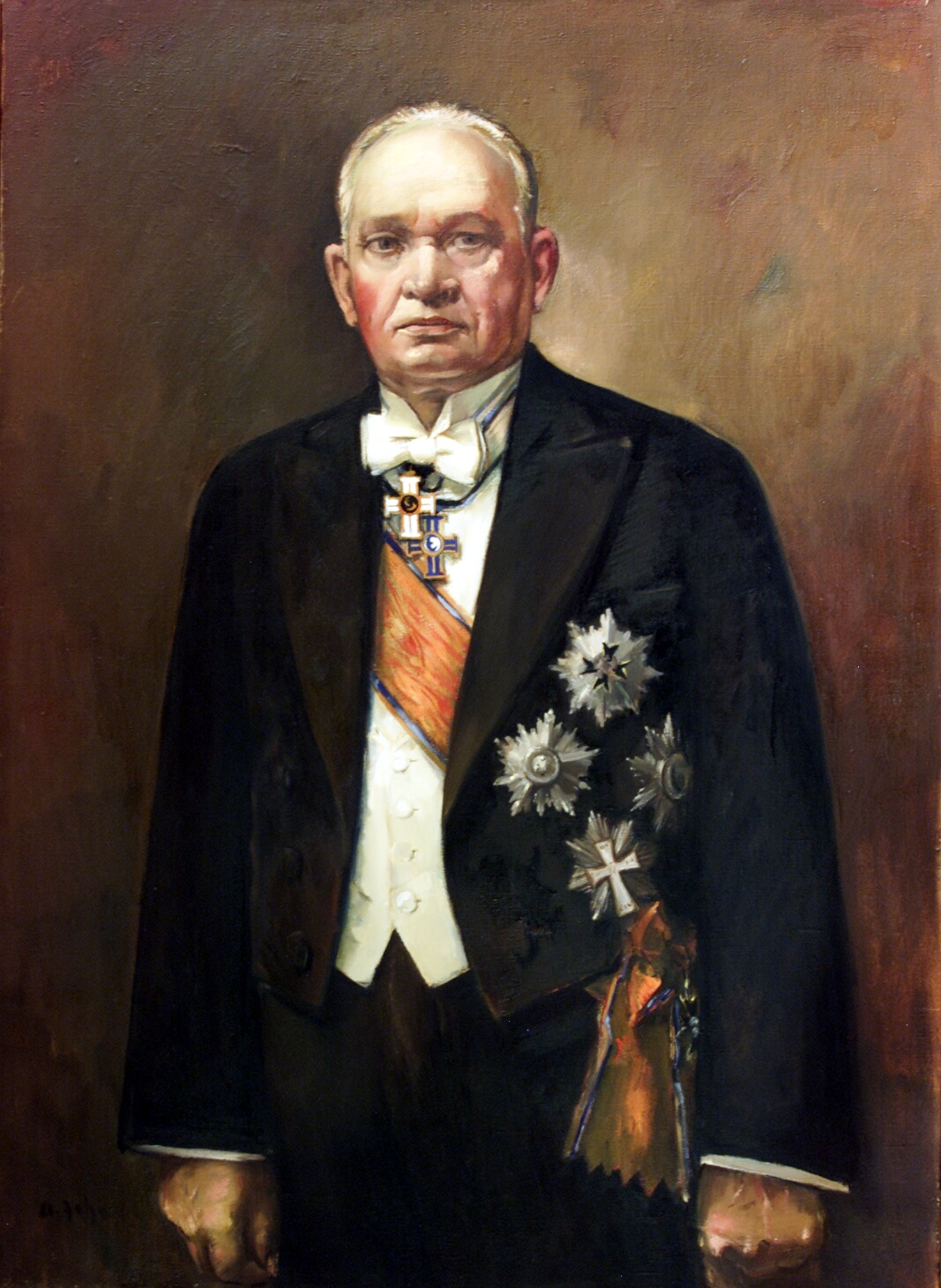
"Mees ordenitega (K. Päts") (1936)

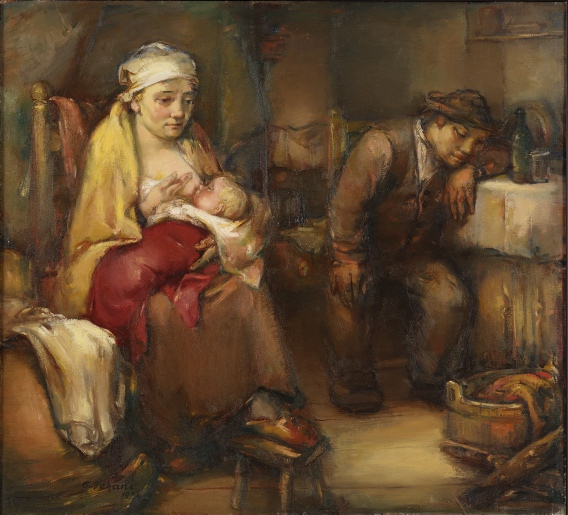
"Ema" (1936)

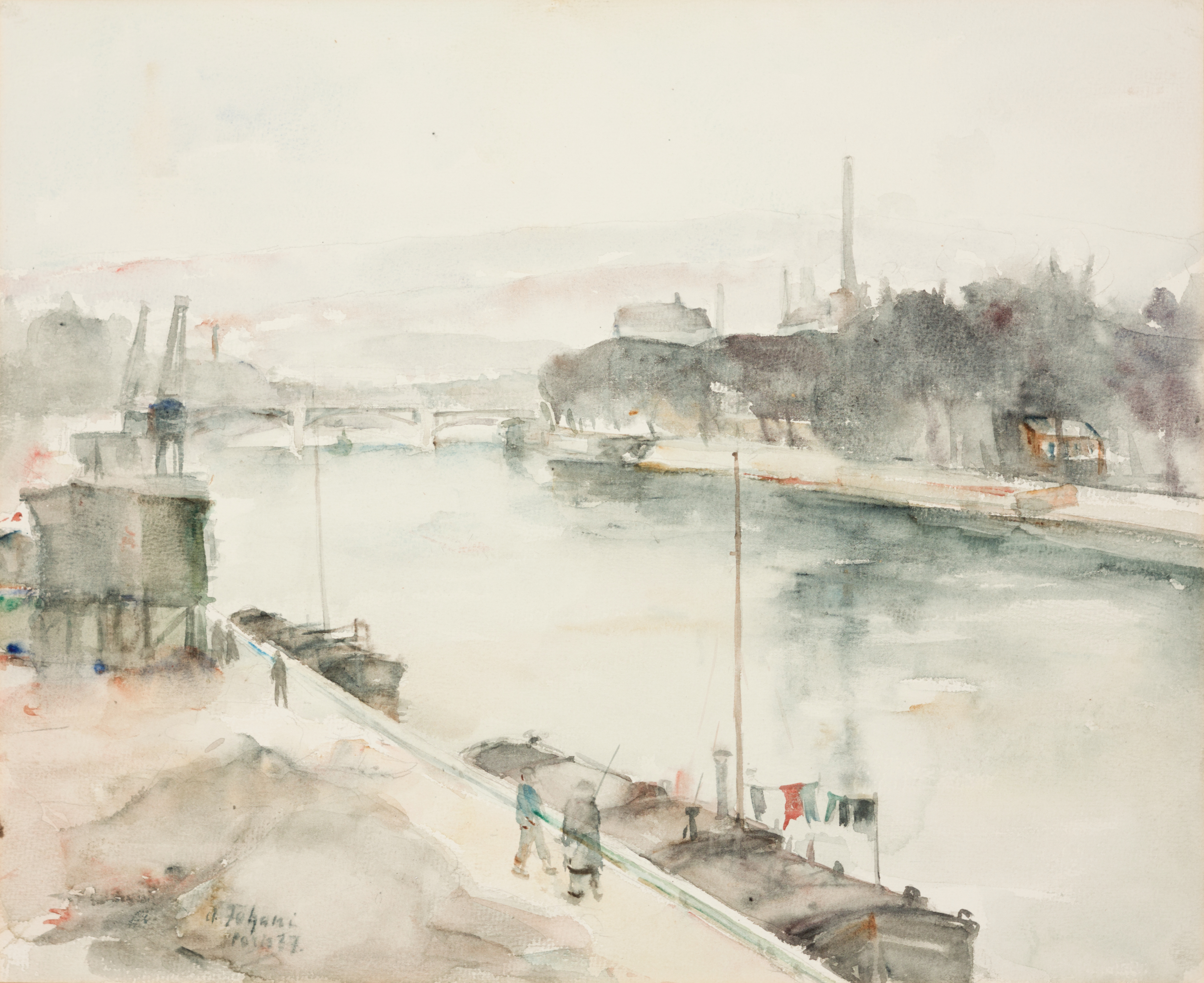
"Pariisi vaade" (1937)

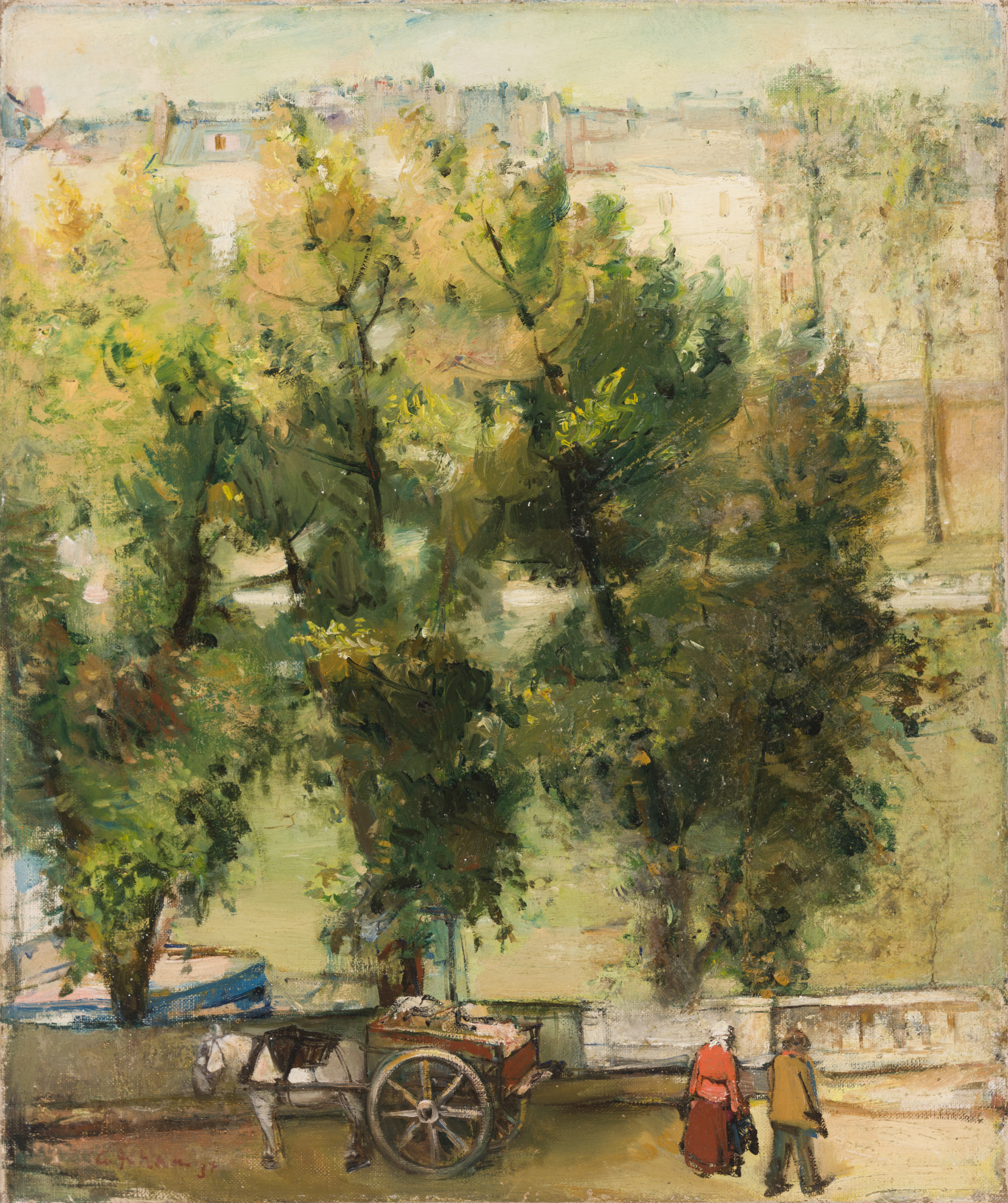
"Pariisi motiiv (Maastik hobusega)" (1937)

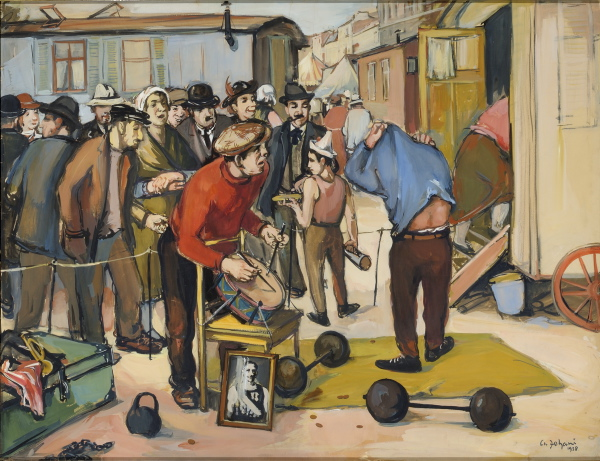
"Pariisi tänavaatleedid" (1938)

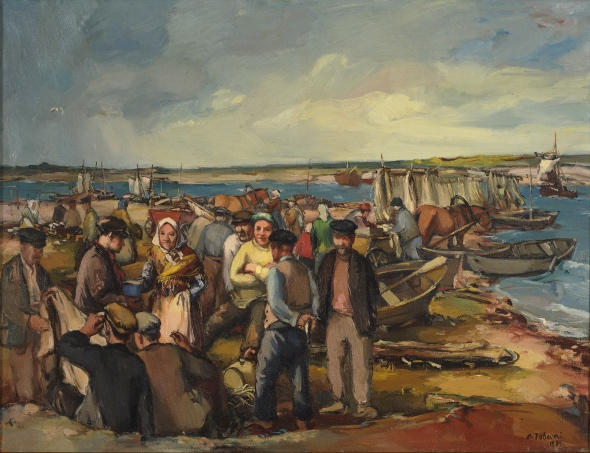
"Rannal" (1939)

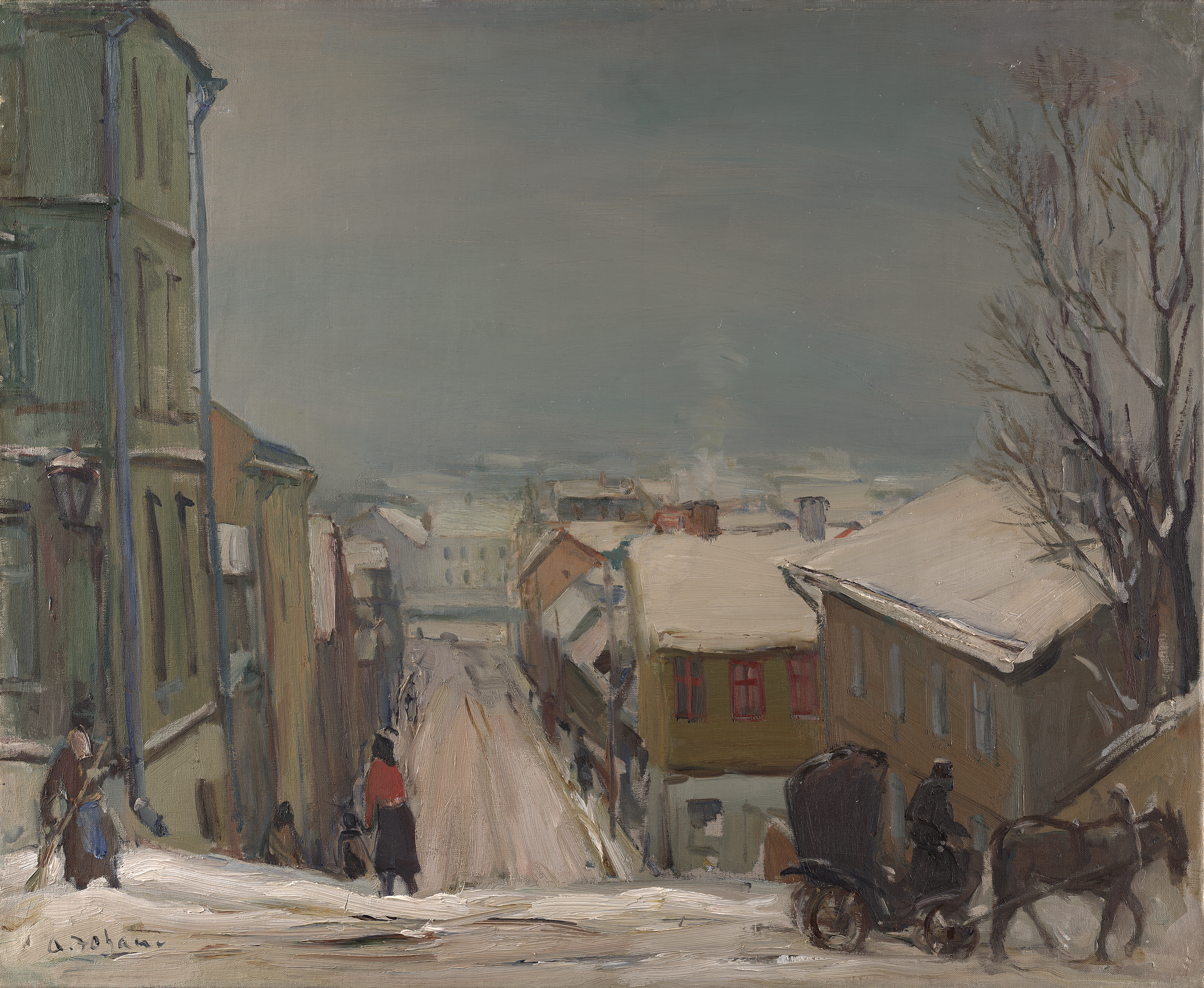
"Talvemaastik Tartus (Liiva tänav talvel)" (1940)
