= Siberi Tööline =

Estonian diaspora newspaper

Siberi Tööline ('Siberian Worker') was an Estonian language newspaper, published from Omsk and Novonikolayevsk, Soviet Russia 1920 to 1922.

== History ==
The first issue of Siberi Tööline appeared in February 1920. In total 90 issues of the newspaper were published 1920–21, 41 during 1920 and 49 during 1921. During the first eight issues it was the organ of the Omsk Estonian Section of the Russian Communist Party (bolsheviks). Issues 9 to 27 of 1920 were published as the organ of the Estonian Agitation and Propaganda Section of the Siberian Regional Bureau of the Russian Communist Party (bolsheviks). From its 28th issues onwards Siberi Tööline was published as the organ of the Estonian Section of the Siberian Regional Bureau of the Central Committee of the Russian Communist Party (bolsheviks). The newspaper had a circulation of 3,000-4,000. Due to its focus on the peasantry, it obtained a certain popularity.

Ferdinand Rei (brother of August Rei) was the editor-in-chief of the newspaper during its initial period. On 6 May 1920 Rei was expelled from the Communist Party for anti-party activities, and thus removed from his editorial post. From the 8th issue Karl Treufeldt took over the management of the publication. From then onwards the publication got an increasingly Bolshevik character. Valter Rätsepp (later an actor, theatre director and play-wright) worked at the newspaper. Siberi Tööline had a sister publication oriented towards youth, Noor Asunik ('Young Colonist').

The newspaper editorial board shifted from Omsk to Novonikolayevsk on 28 July 1921. From 1 January 1922 it was published twice weekly. The newspaper struggled with economic difficulties as a result of the New Economic Policy. Publication was discontinued in March 1922. In September 1922 Siberi Teataja ('Siberian Journal') was founded as a continuation of Siberi Tööline.
