= Magnus Ilmjärv =

Estonian historian

- Born: 31 August 1961 (age 64); Viljandi, then part of Estonian SSR, Soviet Union
- Occupation: historian

Magnus Ilmjärv (born 31 August 1961 in Viljandi) is an Estonian historian.

He graduated from the University of Tartu cum laude in 1988 and defended his MA thesis in 1997. In June 2004 he defended his PhD at the University of Helsinki.

Since 2006, Ilmjärv has been the director of the Estonian Institute of History (Estonian: Ajaloo Instituut). He specializes in Baltic history and international relations between two World Wars. His most notable work is arguably the Silent Submission, which covers the loss of independence of the three Baltic states. In Estonia, he is probably best known for his harsh criticism on the Estonian leadership in 1940, incl. Konstantin Päts.

== Works ==
- Silent Submission. 2004. Stockholm University Dept. of History. ISBN 9122020861

== Sources ==
- http://www.horisont.ee/arhiiv_2003_2006/artikkel791_786.html
