= Tahkuranna =

Village in Estonia

Coordinates: 58°14′45″N 24°29′09″E

- Village
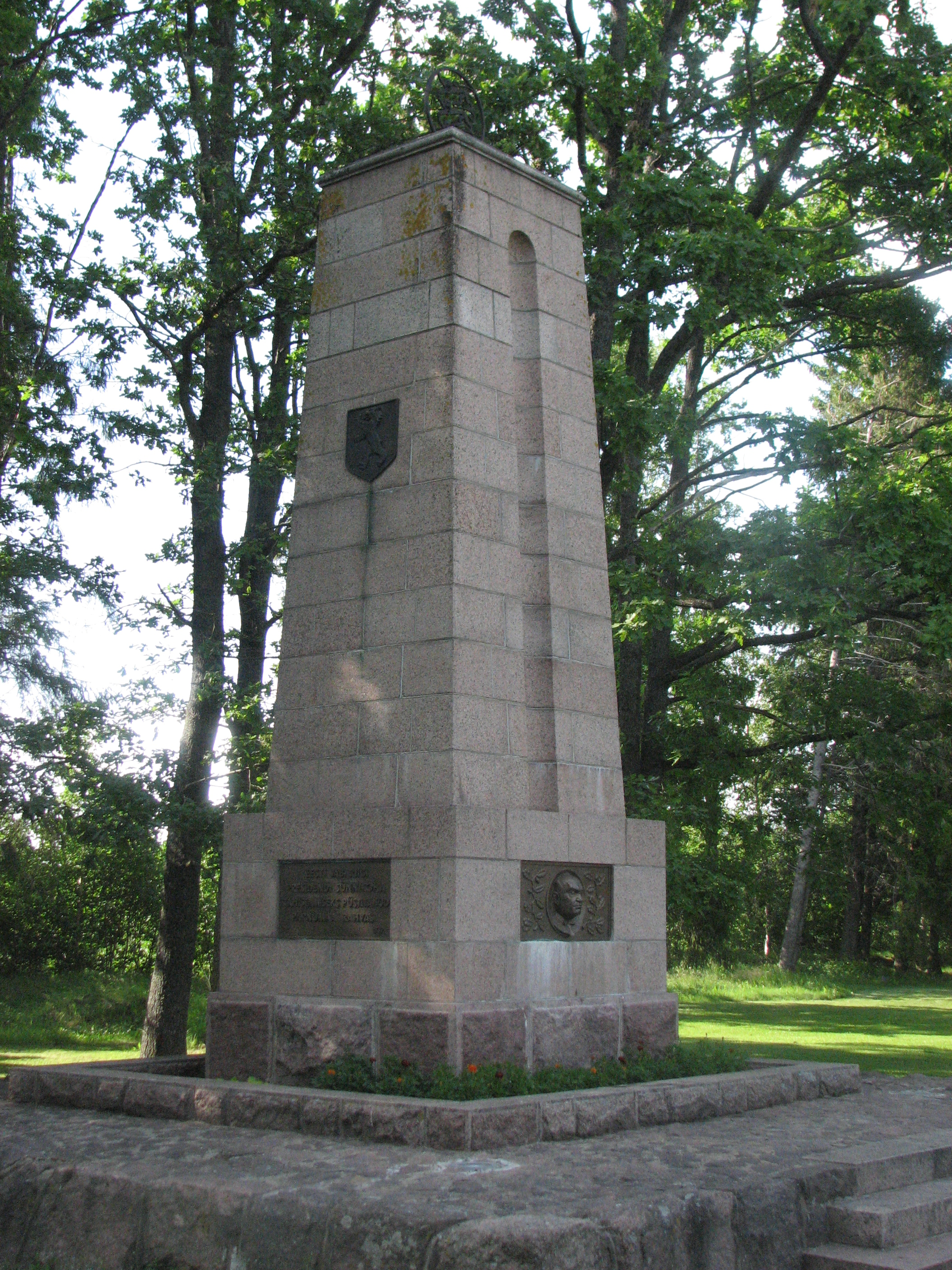
- Monument to Konstantin Päts
- Interactive map of Tahkuranna
- Country: Estonia
- County: Pärnu County
- Parish: Häädemeeste Parish
- Time zone: UTC+2 (EET)
  - Summer (DST): UTC+3 (EEST)

Tahkuranna is a village in Häädemeeste Parish, Pärnu County, in southwestern Estonia. It is the birthplace of Konstantin Päts, the first president of Estonia, and his brother, the artist and politician Voldemar Päts. Tiit Helmja, an Olympic rower, was also born in Tahkuranna.

A monument to Konstantin Päts is located in Tahkuranna. It was erected in 1939, but it was destroyed by the Soviet Union in August 1940, shortly after the Soviet occupation of Estonia. A copy of the monument was installed in 1989 during the Estonian national awakening.
