= Linda Eenpalu =

Estonian politician

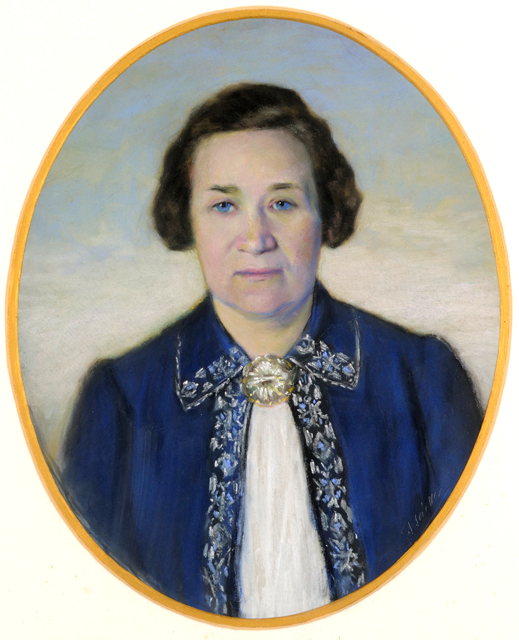
Linda Eenpalu, by Ants Laikmaa (1938)

Linda Marie Eenpalu (born Linda Marie Koplus, until 1935 named Einbund; 20 September 1890 – 4 June 1967) was an Estonian politician. She was a member of the National Constituent Assembly (1937) and a Member of the Second Chamber of the National Council (1938) and the first women in both of these positions. She was a well-known women's rights activist. She was married to politician Kaarel Eenpalu, who was prime minister in 1938–1939.

== Biography ==
Eenpalu studied in Tartu in 1911–1912. She was a librarian at Tartu Public Library Society in 1913–1914, at a high school for girls in 1919–1920 and as a teacher at a high school in Stockholm in 1920–26. She was a co-founder of the Estonian Female Student's Society (1911), member of the central committee of the Estonian Women's Club from 1928, Chairperson of the Central Society of the Estonian Rural Women in 1929–1940 and a member of the National Economic Council in 1935–1938. In 1937, she was a member of the national housing department, and in 1938–1940 she was the only female member of the Second Chamber of the National Council.

She was arrested in 1941 and deported to Tomsk Oblast, where she remained until 1956.
