= Hans Pöögelmann =

Estonian writer, economist and politician

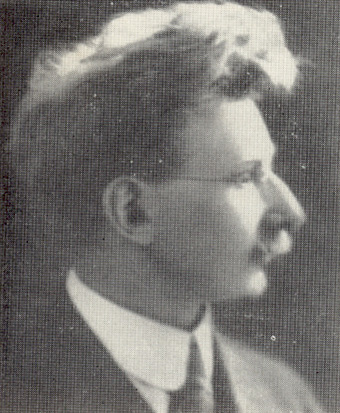
Hans Pöögelmann

Hans Pöögelmann (Note: Russian: Ганс Густавович Пегельман, romanized: Gans Gustavovich Pegelman) (30 December 1875 Aidu Parish, Kreis Fellin, Governorate of Livonia – 27 January 1938, Moscow, Soviet Union) was an Estonian and Soviet Russian socialist, and later communist politician, journalist and poet. In 1917, he was elected a member of the Estonian Provincial Assembly and became a leading figure in the Estonian local Bolshevik movement. After 1919, Pöögelmann left Estonia and continued his political activities in the USSR. In 1938, he was arrested and executed in Moscow by the Soviet Stalinist regime.

== Biography ==
Pöögelmann was born in an Estonian farmer's family. After graduation, he worked as a teacher, and later as a journalist in Estonian-language newspapers Teataja and Postimees. He continued his studies in Leipzig, Germany, where he became a committed Marxist and joined the Russian Social Democratic Labour Party in 1905. In 1907, he participated in the Terijoki Conference of Estonian Organisations in Finland, where he was elected chair of the conference. He was arrested in 1909 and deported to Siberia.

In 1911, he escaped from Siberia and settled in New York City, USA. There he worked as the editor of the newspaper Uus Ilm until 1917.

Pöögelmann returned to Russia after the 1917 February Revolution, became a member of the Tallinn (Reval) city council, and was elected to the Estonian Provincial Assembly. He remained a loyal supporter of Lenin's regime after the Bolshevik coup in November 1917. During the 1918–1919 Soviet invasion of Estonia, Pöögelmann participated in the establishment of the Commune of the Working People of Estonia in parts of eastern Estonia that had been occupied by the Red Army (he was appointed "Commissioner of the National Economy").

After the Estonian army pushed the Bolshevik forces out of the country, Pöögelmann moved to Soviet Russia and became head of the Estonian section of the People's Commissariat of Nationalities. Pöögelmann was among the founders of the Communist International and was later elected to its Executive Committee. He was a delegate in the 1st-6th Congresses of the Comintern.

He was a professor at the Communist University of the National Minorities of the West and Herzen University. Pöögelmann was a member of the Central Committee of the Communist Party of Estonia and edited various of its publications. Pöögelmann was also the writer of many works on the economy and the workers' movement in Estonia.

Pöögelmann was arrested during the Stalinist Great Purge, sentenced to death for alleged "anti-Soviet activities" and executed in January 1938.

Pöögelmann was rehabilitated by the Soviets posthumously after Stalin's death. After that, several streets and schools were named after him during the Estonian Soviet Socialist Republic. Also Tondi Elektroonika, a factory for electrotechnical components was named after Pöögelmann.

== Poetry ==
In 1898, in his poem "Sonnets on the Ruins of Viljandi Castle" ( Est. "Sonetid Viljandi lossivaremetel" ), he predicted the coming of new times for Estonia. In various publications, he published poetry under the pseudonym H. Rooskaja, including such poems as "I throw logs" ("Puid pillun", 1900 ), "Spring winds" ("Kevadetuuled", 1904), "Snowdrifts" ("Hanged", 1904). A collection of his satirical poems, "Rough Sketches," was published in 1910. The best of his poems in 1925 were published as a separate collection called "Spring Winds" ("Kevadetuuled"). In 1936, he published a collection of his poems, "To those who fell in the fight for brothers."

Pöögelmann translated The Internationale and La Marseillaise into Estonian language.
