= Flag of the Estonian Soviet Socialist Republic =

Flag of Estonian Soviet Socialist Republic
- Flag of the Estonian SSR (1953–1990)
- Use: Civil and state flag, civil and state ensign
- Proportion: 1:2
- Adopted: 6 February 1953
- Relinquished: 8 May 1990; 36 years ago
- Design: A red flag with the golden hammer and sickle and outlined star above a band of blue water waves near the bottom.
- Designed by: Paul Luhtein
- Reverse of the flag (1953–1990)
- Use: Civil and state flag, civil and state ensign
- Proportion: 1:2
- Flag of the Estonian SSR (1940–1953)
- Use: Civil and state flag, civil and state ensign
- Proportion: 1:2
- Adopted: 31 October 1940
- Relinquished: 6 February 1953

The flag of the Estonian Soviet Socialist Republic was officially adopted by the former Soviet Union in 1940. It showed a set of communist symbols: a yellow hammer and sickle on a red field and, after official change of the flag's design in 1953, a band of water waves near the bottom.

== History ==
=== First design ===
The Soviet Union invaded and occupied Estonia in June 1940. The country was subsequently annexed and incorporated into the USSR as an administrative subdivision. Soon after the occupation began, the occupation authorities started removing and destroying symbols of independent Estonia. Monuments were demolished and state symbols – including the blue-black-white national flag – were banned.

From 31 October 1940, the occupation authorities used a standard Soviet style red flag with the Latin script abbreviation ENSV replacing the star above the hammer and sickle.

=== Second design ===
After the United Nations admitted both the Ukrainian SSR and the Byelorussian SSR as separate founding members in 1945, an issue arose that nearly all Soviet republics used almost identical red flags. In response, the Presidium of the Supreme Soviet of the USSR issued a resolution in 1947 calling for the Soviet republics to redesign their flags. The resolution established that the new republican flags should: 1) retain the red field as the dominant colour; 2) include the hammer and sickle and the red star from the USSR state flag and 3) incorporate national colours and/or ornaments representing the republic.

The occupation authorities in Estonia adopted a new flag design on 6 February 1953. The updated flag followed the general style of the Soviet Union's flag, with six pointed blue and white wavy stripes added to the lower part, symbolising the Baltic Sea. The design used pointed waves and retained a red stripe beneath the waves in order to distinguish it from the similar flag of the Latvian SSR. The arrangement of the blue and white colours was also carefully calculated to prevent the formation of blue-black-white colour combination when the flag was displayed with a black mourning ribbon.

The 1953 decree of the Supreme Soviet of the Estonian SSR defined the flag design as follows: "To establish as the flag of the Estonian Soviet Socialist Republic a red cloth crossed by a blue wavy stripe with two white stripes above it, forming six pointed waves along the length of the flag. The blue wavy stripe together with the white stripes shall constitute three-tenths of the width of the flag. The upper red stripe shall constitute one-half of the width of the flag, and the lower red stripe one-fifth of the width of the flag. In the upper left corner of the upper red section of the flag, at a distance of one-sixth of the flag's length from the hoist, a golden hammer and sickle shall be depicted, with a red five-pointed star outlined in gold above them. The ratio of the flag's width to its length shall be 1:2."

=== Restoration of national flag and ban of the Soviet symbols ===
During the period of foreign rule from 1940 to 1991, the Estonian diaspora and Estonian diplomatic representatives abroad continued to use the national flag of Estonia. Within the Soviet Union, however, the blue-black-white tricolour and even references to the colour combination were prohibited and could lead to legal punishment until 1988.

On 20 October 1988, the Supreme Soviet of the Estonian SSR adopted the "Regulation on the Use of Estonian National Symbols", which decriminalised the use of the blue-black-white flag.

On the evening of 23 February 1989, the flag of the Estonian SSR was permanently lowered from the Pikk Hermann tower of Toompea Castle – the traditional symbolic flag tower of Estonia, which for centuries had represented political authority over the country. The following day, 24 February 1989, the 71st anniversary of the Republic of Estonia, the blue-black-white national flag was raised on the tower for the first time since 22 September 1944, when Otto Tief's interim government had exercised authority during the brief window between the German retreat and the returning Soviet invasion forces.

With the Act on Symbols of Estonia, adopted on 8 May 1990 – more than a year before Estonia restored full independence – the use of the symbols of the Estonian SSR and the official name "Estonian SSR" itself were discontinued. On 7 August 1990, the Supreme Council of the Republic of Estonia officially restored the blue-black-white flag as the state flag of the Republic of Estonia.

During the interim period leading up to the restoration of independence the flag of the Estonian SSR was used by the pro-Soviet Intermovement of ethnic Russians in Estonia. On 15 May 1990, the organisation held a protest rally in front of the Toompea Castle, the seat of the Estonian parliament. The demonstration escalated into violence, the protesters broke into the inner courtyard of the castle and attempted to break into the parliament hall itself. During the rally Estonian SSR flag was raised over the building. Prime Minister Edgar Savisaar's radio announcement "Toompea is under attack, I repeat: Toompea is under attack" mobilised an even larger crowd of Estonians, who arrived at Toompea and forced the anti-independence protesters to disperse. The pro-Soviet demonstrators were forced to leave from Toompea Hill with their Soviet and Estonian SSR flags, while Estonian protesters shouting "Shame, shame" formed a corridor allowing them to leave.

On 21 April 2022, following Russia's full-scale invasion of Ukraine, the Riigikogu adopted the Act on Symbols of Aggression, among others prohibiting the public display of Soviet symbols, including the flag of the Estonian SSR.

== See also ==
- Flag of the Soviet Union
- Red Banner
- Emblem of the Estonian SSR
- Flag of Estonia
