= Flags of counties of Estonia =

Overview of the flags of Estonian counties

The flags of the 15 counties of Estonia are all white and green, with the coat of arms of the respective county on the white part. This design was first established in 1938. The list also includes the historical flag of Petseri County, which in 1944 was occupied by Soviet forces and became Pechorsky District in Pskov Oblast, present-day Russia. The district was claimed by Estonia after the re-establishing of independence in 1991, but the claim was dropped in 1995. The county governments along with county governors were abolished with the 2017 administrative-territorial reform, and their tasks were transferred to ministries, however remain in use by some municipal associations (omavalitsuste).

== County flags ==
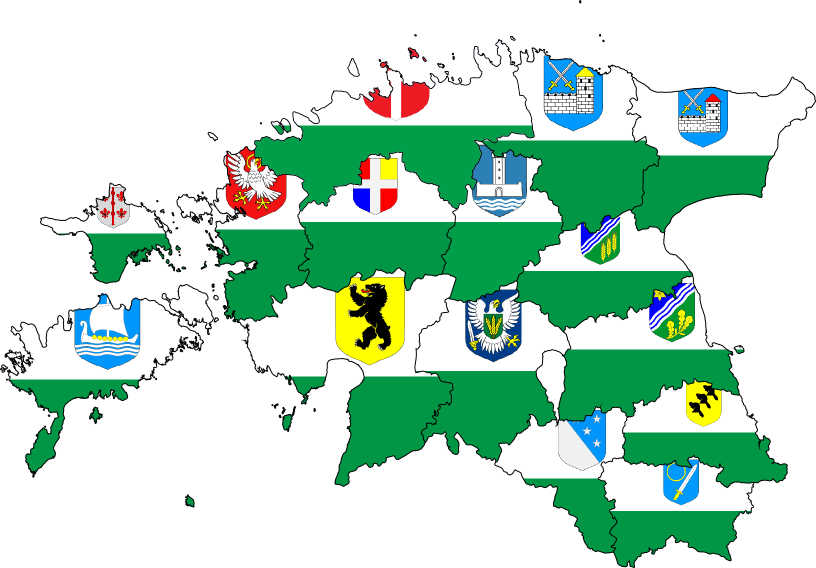
Map of the flags of Estonia's counties.

Harju County

Hiiu County

Ida-Viru County

Jõgeva County

Järva County

Lääne County

Lääne-Viru County

Põlva County

Pärnu County

Rapla County

Saare County

Tartu County

Valga County

Viljandi County

Võru County

Petseri County

== See also ==
- Estonia
- Flag of Estonia
- Municipalities of Estonia
