= Pikk Hermann =

Tower in Tallinn

Coordinates: 59°26′06.7″N 24°44′13.0″E

Tall Hermann
- Pikk Hermann (Estonian)
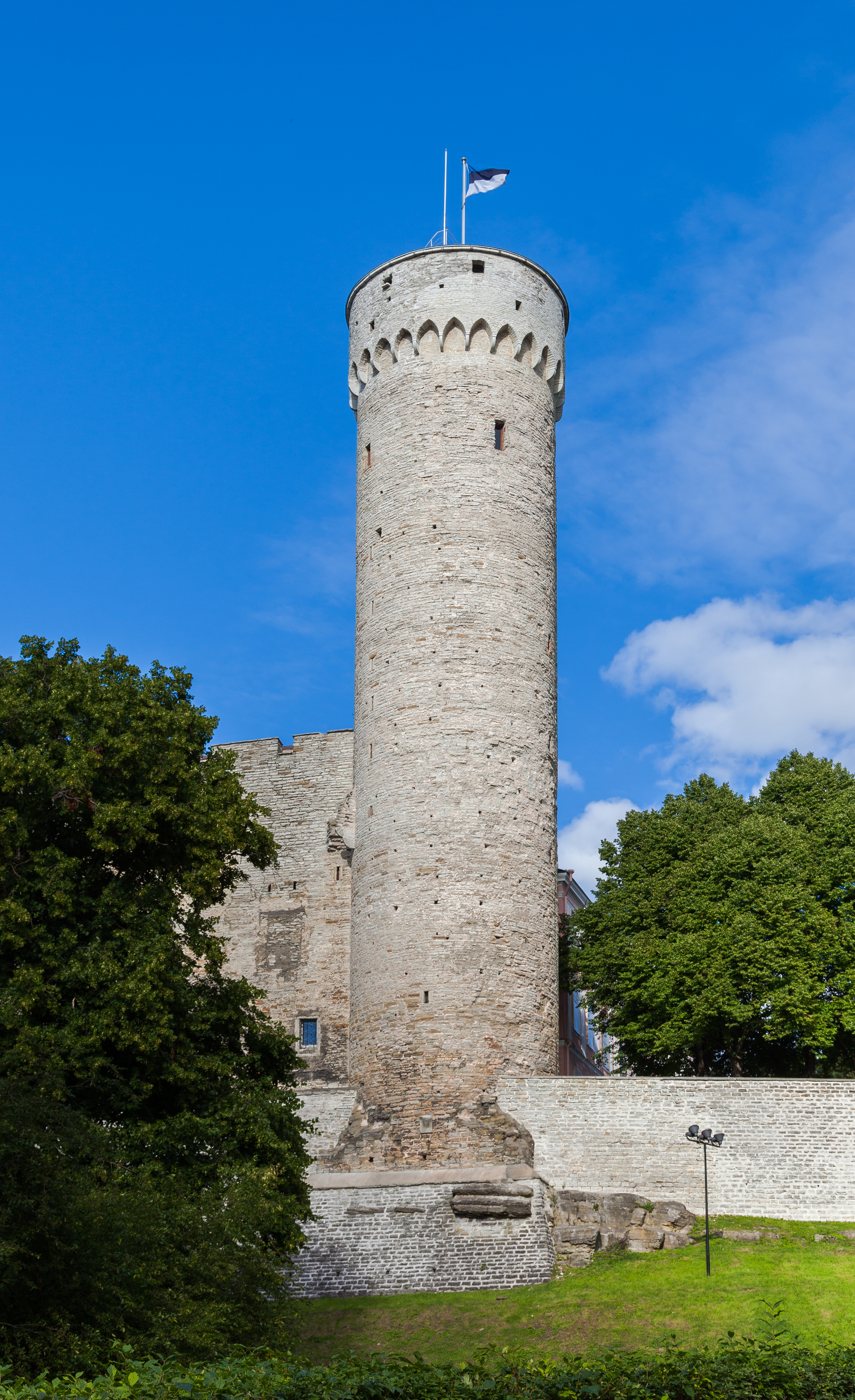
- Pikk Hermann tower
- Interactive map of Tall Hermann
- Type: Castle tower
- Location: Tallinn, Estonia

UNESCO World Heritage Site
- Official name: Tallinn Old Town
- Type: Cultural
- Criteria: II, IV
- Designated: 1997
- Country: Estonia
- Region: Europe and North America

Pikk Hermann (Estonian lit. 'the Tall Hermann'; German: Langer Hermann) is a tower of the Toompea Castle, on Toompea hill in Tallinn, the capital of Estonia. The first part of the tower was built in 1360–1370. It was rebuilt (height brought to 45.6 metres (150 ft)) in the 16th century. A staircase with 215 steps now leads to the top of the tower. It consists of ten internal floors and a viewing platform at the top.

Pikk Hermann is situated next to the building of the Estonian parliament (Riigikogu). The flag on the top of the tower at 95 metres (312 ft) above sea level is one of the main symbols of the national government in force.

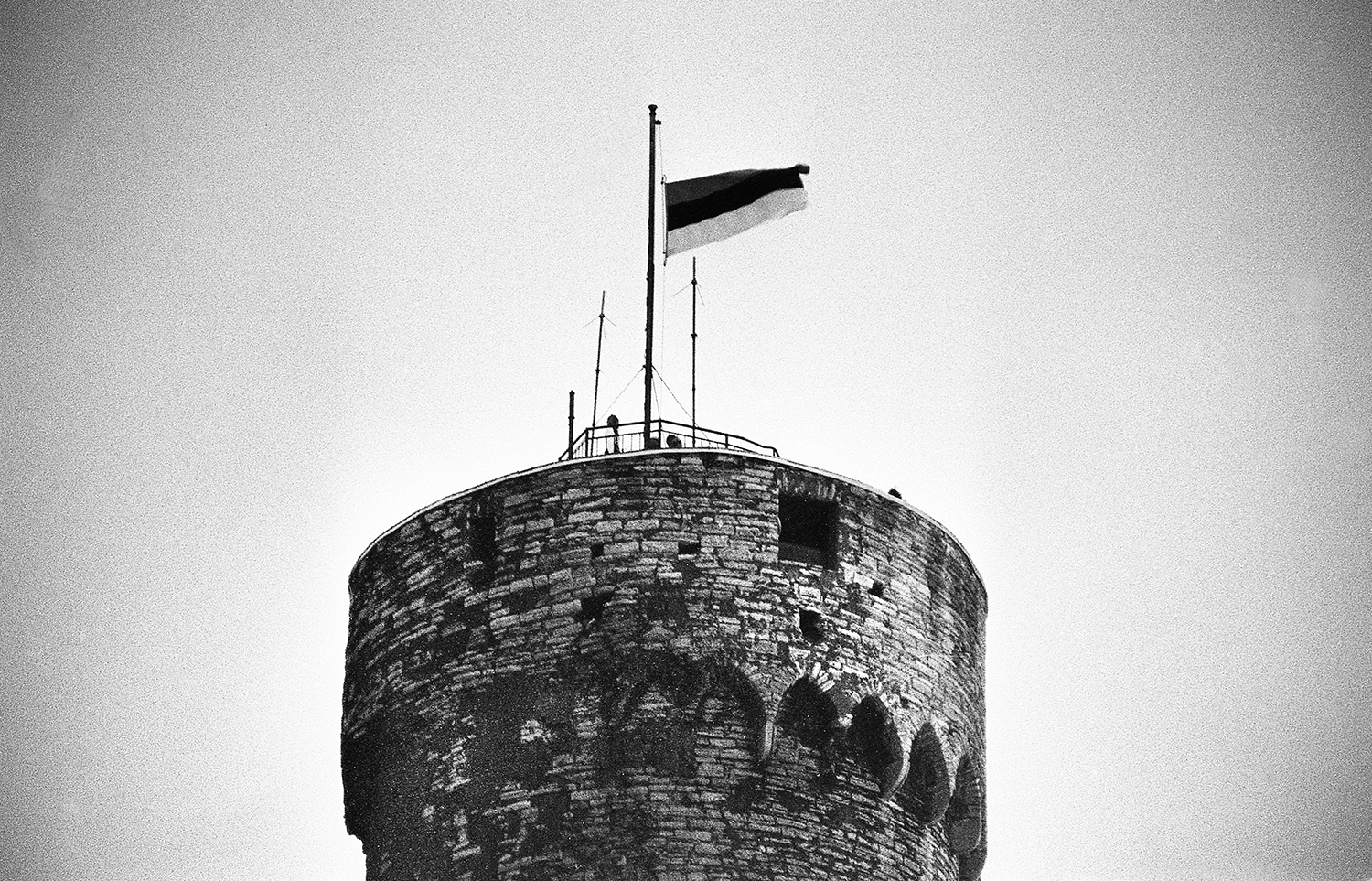
For the first time after the Soviet invasion of Estonia in 1944, the blue-black-white national flag of Estonia was raised again on the top of Pikk Hermann on 24 February 1989.

The national flag, a blue-black-white tricolour measuring 191 centimetres (75 in) by 300 centimetres (120 in), is raised and the national anthem is played at the time of sunrise (or at 7 am, whichever is later) and lowered at the time of sunset. While it is lowered, the melody of "Mu isamaa on minu arm" (My Fatherland Is My Love) is heard. For the first time, the national flag was raised to the top of Pikk Hermann in 1918, when Estonia became an independent country. The Soviet troops who later occupied Estonia lowered the flag from the tower in the summer of 1940 and later replaced it with the flag of the Estonian Soviet Socialist Republic. The original flag was raised back on the tower on February 24, 1989. Since then, raising the flag to the top of the tower is one of the traditions of Estonia's Independence Day.

The Estonian flag was also briefly raised over the Pikk Hermann during Otto Tief's brief interim government of Sept 18-22, 1944.
