= Flag of Estonia =

Republic of Estonia
- Sinimustvalge
- Use: Civil flag and ensign
- Proportion: 7:11
- Adopted: 21 November 1918; 107 years ago
- Design: A horizontal tricolour of blue, black, and white
- Naval ensign
- Use: Naval ensign
- Proportion: 7:13
- Adopted: 1922
- Design: Tricolour, swallowtail, defaced with the shield of the state arms off-set towards hoist.

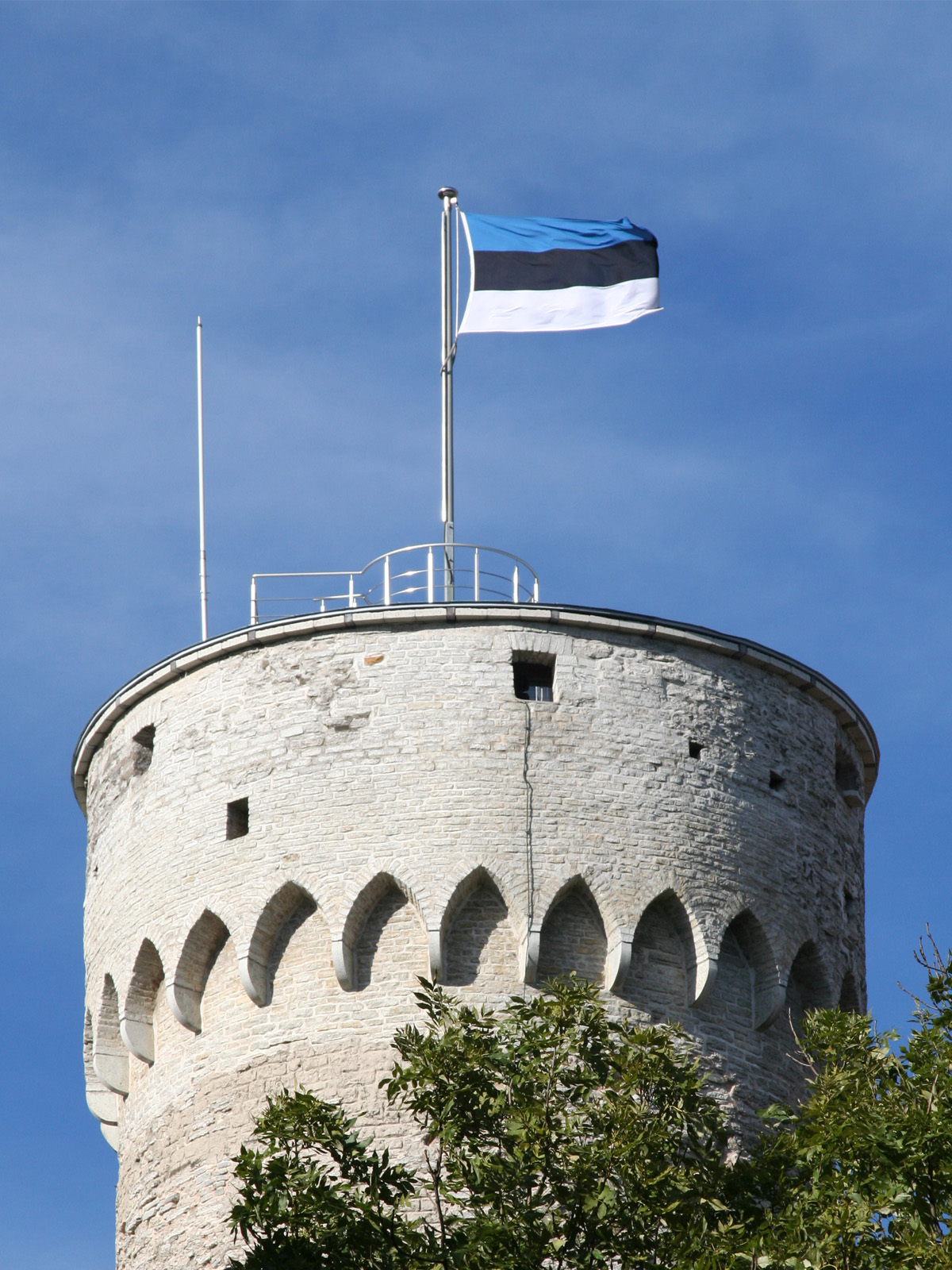
The flag of Estonia waving above the Pikk Hermann tower of Toompea Castle in Tallinn.

The national flag of Estonia (Eesti lipp) is a tricolour featuring three equal horizontal bands of blue at the top, black in the middle, and white at the bottom. The flag is called sinimustvalge (lit. 'blue-black-white') in Estonian.

The tricolour was already in wide use as the symbol of the nation, when the Republic of Estonia became an independent country in 1918. Formally, the tricolour became the national flag by the decision of the Estonian government on 21 November 1918, and the parliament later reconfirmed the flag's official status with a law in 1922.

During World War II, soon after the Soviet army had invaded and occupied Estonia in June 1940, the new Stalinist occupation regime banned the Estonian flag, and its use as well as any use of its blue, black and white colour combination became punishable by laws of the Soviet Union. The Estonian flag was from 1940 until 1991 continuously used by the Estonian government-in-exile, diplomatic service, and the diaspora of Estonian refugees around the world.

In October 1988, the public use of the tricolour flag was officially permitted again by the local authorities. On 23 February 1989, the Soviet red flag was taken down permanently from the most symbolic site of display, the Pikk Hermann tower of the Toompea Castle in the capital city Tallinn. It was replaced with the blue-black-white flag on the next morning, 24 February 1989, upon the 71st anniversary of the Estonian Declaration of Independence (1918). The national flag was officially re-adopted by the Estonian authorities in August 1990, one year before the nation's full restoration of independence in August 1991.

== Official versions of the flag ==
Flag of the President

Flag of the Minister of Defence

Naval jack

== History ==
In the 1820s, in the University of Tartu (Dorpat), three eponymous German-speaking student corporations (corps) were established for each of the three Baltic provinces (Estonia, Livonia and Curonia). Each of them selected their own "colours" (Note: German: "Farben"; Estonian: "värvid") which, in turn, over time, became flags and informal visual representations of the corresponding province. Public display (for example, as part of attire) of these colour combinations was prohibited by the authorities of the Russian Empire in 1821–1862, in 1887–1904 and, after the outbreak of World War I, finally and completely banned during the anti-German propaganda campaign in 1915.

In 1870, the predecessor of the Estonian Students' Society, the first Estonian-speaking student organisation, was established at the University of Tartu, and in 1881 it adopted a similar set of three "colours": blue, black, and white. Unlike the earlier corps' colour combinations, each one of the three colours of the new organisation was ascribed symbolic meanings. The first such tricolour flag was made in the spring of 1884 and consecrated at Otepää on June 4 the same year.

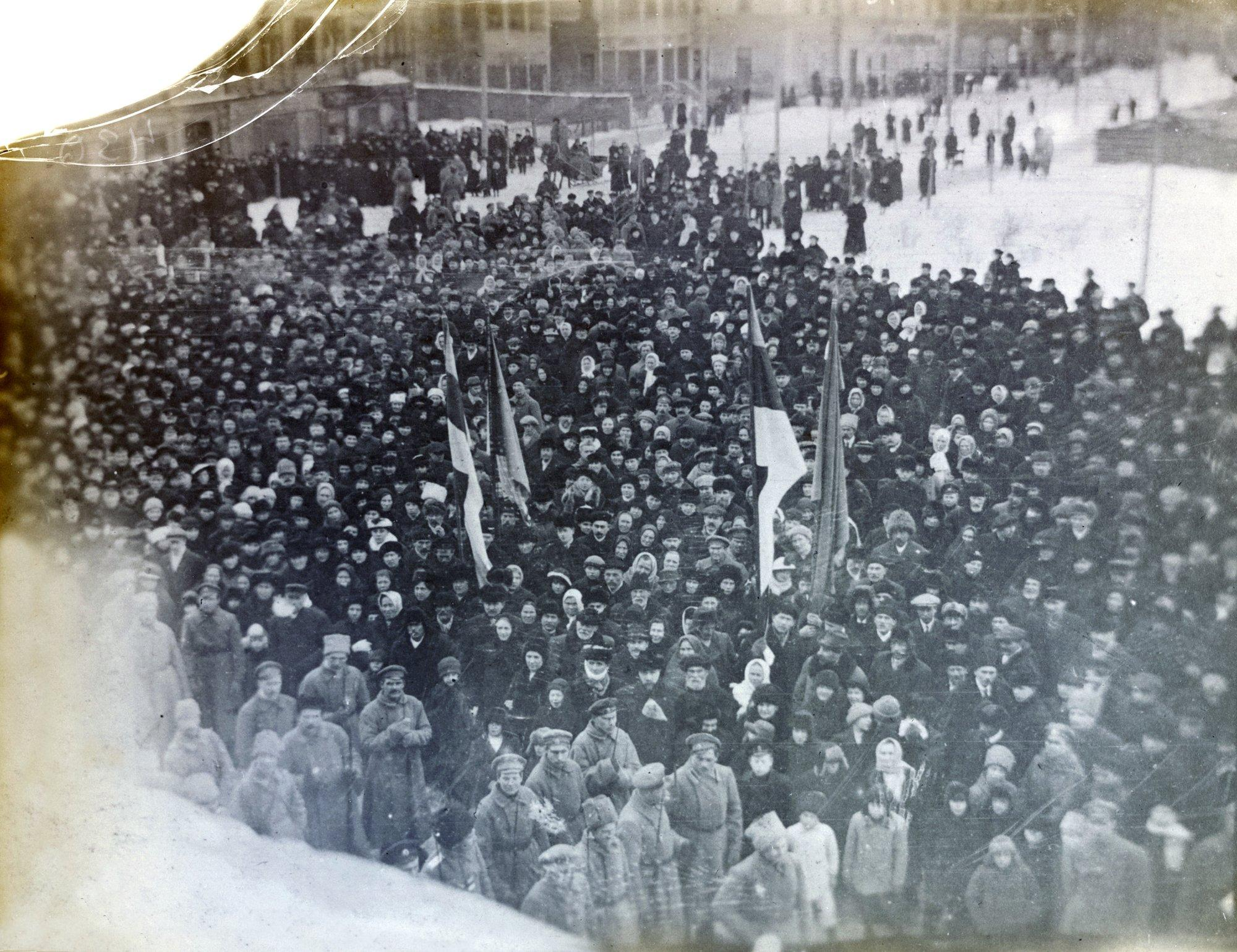
Flags of Estonia on display after the proclamation of the Estonian Declaration of Independence in Pärnu on 23 February 1918. One of the first images of the Republic of Estonia.

The blue-black-white flag of the Estonian university student organisation was later on gradually associated with Estonian nationalism and, by the beginning of the 20th century, it had already become the de facto flag of the Estonian-speaking people. It was known as "the nation's flag" (rahvuslipp) when the Estonian Declaration of Independence was issued on 23–24 February 1918. Formally, the tricolour became the national flag of the newly independent country by the decision of the Estonian Provisional Government on 21 November 1918. On 12 December 1918, the flag was for the first time raised on top of the Pikk Hermann tower in Tallinn, the capital city of Estonia, and that location has since become its most symbolic site of display. The flag's official status was reconfirmed by a law passed by the parliament of Estonia on 16 July 1922.

The invasion of Estonia by the Soviet army on 16–17 June 1940 was followed by the banning of the flag by the occupation authorities. It was taken down from the most symbolic location, the tower of Pikk Hermann in Tallinn, on 21 June 1940, when the country was still formally independent. On the next day, 22 June, it was hoisted along with the red flag. The Estonian tricolour disappeared completely from the tower on 27 July 1940, and was replaced by the red flag of the Soviet Union.

During the German occupation from 1941 until 1944, the tricolour was widely and freely used as the symbol of the country and the people of Estonia. However the Nazi German authorities never recognized Estonia as an independent state and the German war ensign alone was flown from the Pikk Hermann tower. After the German retreat from Tallinn in September 1944, the Estonian tricolour was hoisted there, once again, for just a few days.

When the Soviet army reconquered Tallinn on 22 September 1944, the blue-black-white flag disappeared from the Pikk Hermann tower. Its place was subsequently taken by the Soviet red flags until 1989. Any display or distribution of the blue-black-white flag remained a punishable crime by the Soviet laws which were enforced until the late 1980s. 21 October 1987 was the first time when Soviet forces did not take down the flag at a public event.

In October 1988, the public use of the tricolour flag was officially permitted again by the local authorities. On 23 February 1989, the Soviet red flag was taken down permanently from the Pikk Hermann tower in Tallinn. It was replaced there with the blue-black-white flag on the next morning, 24 February 1989, upon the 70th anniversary of the Estonian Declaration of Independence (1918). It was formally redeclared as the national flag on 7 August 1990, a little over a year before Estonia restored full independence.

== Specifications ==
When the Estonian flag is displayed vertically, it should be so that the blue appears on the left of the flag when viewed by an observer.

The colour shades are defined by Parliament and Government Office as follows:

Scheme	Blue	Black	White
Pantone (Paper)	285 C	Black	White
Web colours	#0072CE	#000000	#FFFFFF
RGB	0, 114, 206	0, 0, 0	255, 255, 255
CMYK	100%, 45%, 0%, 19%	0%, 0%, 0%, 100%	0%, 0%, 0%, 0%

=== Selections from the Estonian Flag Act ===
The first version of the Estonian Flag Act, passed in 1922, specified the blue colour as "sky- or cornflower-blue", as well as the proportion of the flag as 7:11 and the nominal size as 105 by 165 centimetres (41 in × 65 in). On 7 July 1992 the shade of blue was further defined as Pantone code 285 C.

The most recent Estonian Flag Act was passed 23 March 2005 and came into force on 1 January 2006. Amended several times since then, the Act specifies the colours in Pantone and CMYK formats, as well as the times and manner in which the flag should be hoisted and by whom it may be used. The minimum size of the flag to be hoisted on a wall-mounted flagstaff or on a flagpole on the roof of a building is 105 by 165 centimetres (41 in × 65 in). The Act specifies that the "Estonian flag is used as the ethnic and the national flag".

More specifically, the Flag Act specifies that the flag be hoisted on the Pikk Hermann tower in Tallinn every day at sunrise, but not earlier than 7:00 a.m., and is lowered at sunset. The flag flying days are:

- 3 January: Commemoration Day of Combatants of the Estonian War of Independence
- 2 February: Anniversary of Tartu Peace Treaty
- 24 February: Independence Day
- 14 March: Mother Tongue Day
- 23 April: Veterans' Day
- The second Sunday of May: Mothers' Day
- 9 May: Europe Day
- 1 June: Day for the Protection of Children
- 4 June: Flag Day
- 14 June: Day of Mourning
- 23 June: Victory Day
- 24 June: Midsummer Day
- 20 August: Day of Restoration of Independence
- 1 September: Day of Knowledge
- The second Sunday of September: Grandparents' Day
- The third Saturday of October: Finno-Ugric Day
- The second Sunday of November: Fathers' Day
- The day of election of the Riigikogu (parliament), the day of election of local councils, the day of a referendum and the day of election of the European Parliament.

== Symbolism ==
There is a popular song dedicated specifically to the flag of Estonia: "The Estonian Flag" (Estonian: Eesti lipp). The author of its lyrics, Martin Lipp, had an eponymous last name, and his poem was set to music in 1922 by composer Enn Võrk. A symbolic interpretation made popular by the poetry of Martin Lipp has it that the blue stands for the blue sky above Estonians, the black for the attachment to the soil of their homeland, and the white for purity, hard work and commitment.

== Various historical flags ==
Legendary royal flag of Denmark and the Duchy of Estonia (1219–1346)

War flag of the State of the Teutonic Order (1226–1561)

Flag of Tallinn (former Hanseatic city of Reval), since 13th century, based on the three blue lions of the coats of arms of Tallinn and Estonia

Flag of the Kingdom of Sweden and its Duchy of Estonia (1561–1721)

Landesfarben tricolour of German-speaking student society Estonia (1821–1939), an unofficial regional symbol (banned by Russian authorities 1821–1862, 1887–1904, 1915–1918)

Tricolour of Romanov dynasty (Emperor of Russia, Prince of Estonia, 1721–1917), national flag of the Russian Empire (1858–1896)

Flag of the Estonian SSR (1940–1941, 1944–1953)

Flag of Reichskommissariat Ostland of the German Reich (1941–1944)

Flag of the Estonian SSR (1953–1990)

== Nordic flag proposals ==
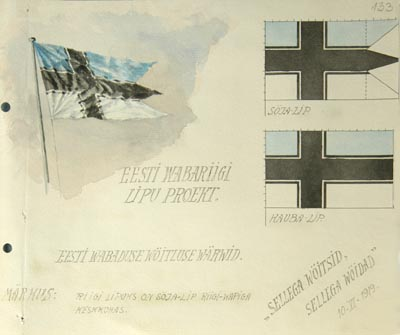
An Estonian cross flag proposal from 1919.

Several Nordic cross designs were proposed already in 1919, prior to the official adoption of the Estonian state flag. In 2001, journalist Kaarel Tarand made a similar suggestion again – that the flag design be changed from a tricolour to a Nordic cross with the same three colours. Supporters of this idea have claimed that the cross, instead of a tricolour design, would better symbolise Estonia's links with Nordic countries. However, as the traditional tricolour bands have by now become an important symbol of national identity, proposals to modify the national flag have not gained much popularity.

Advocates for a Nordic flag have stated that Estonians consider themselves a Nordic nation rather than Baltic, based on their cultural and historical ties with Sweden, Denmark, and particularly Finland.

== Photo gallery ==
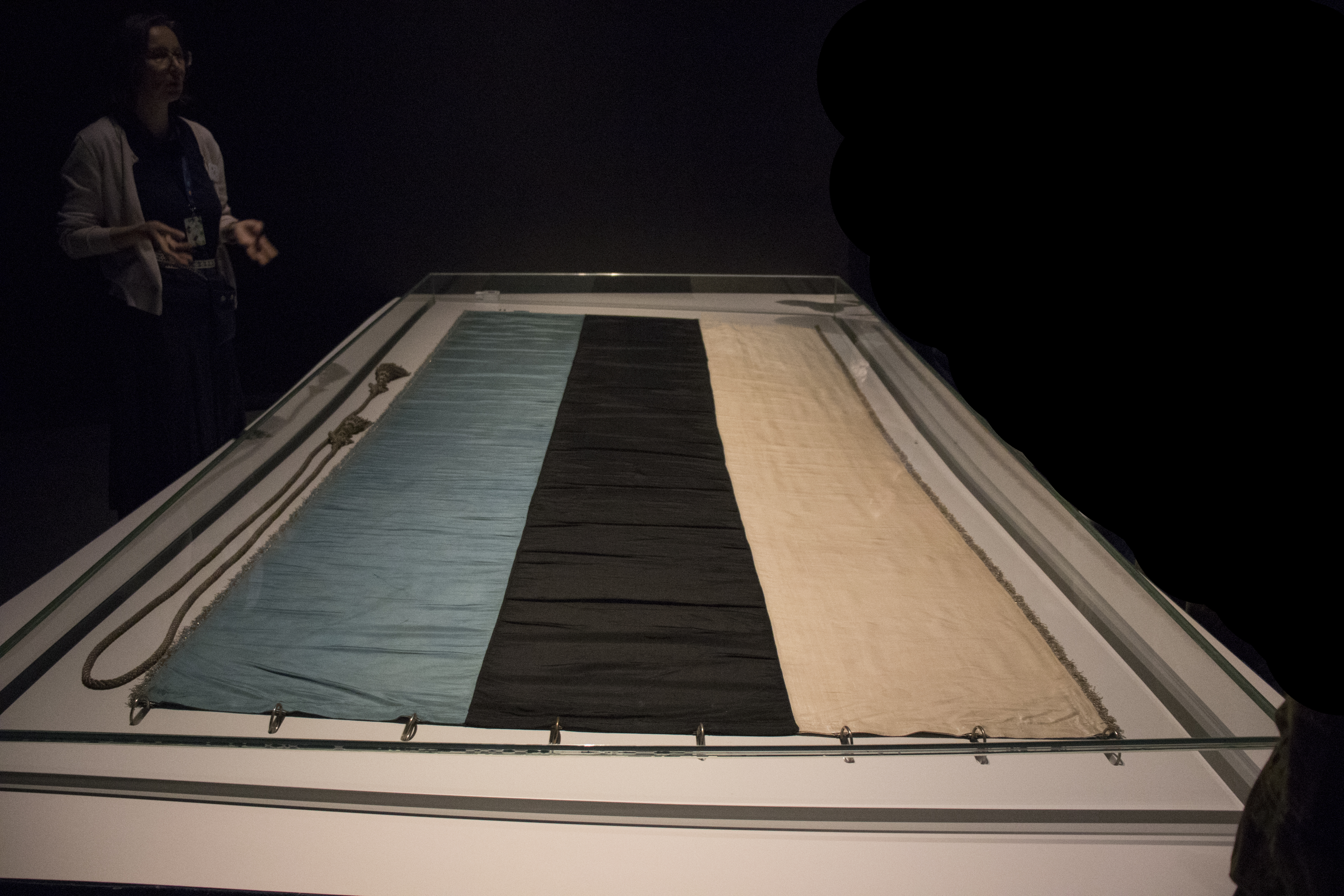
The first ever Estonian flag, made in 1884 (on display in the Estonian National Museum, 2018)

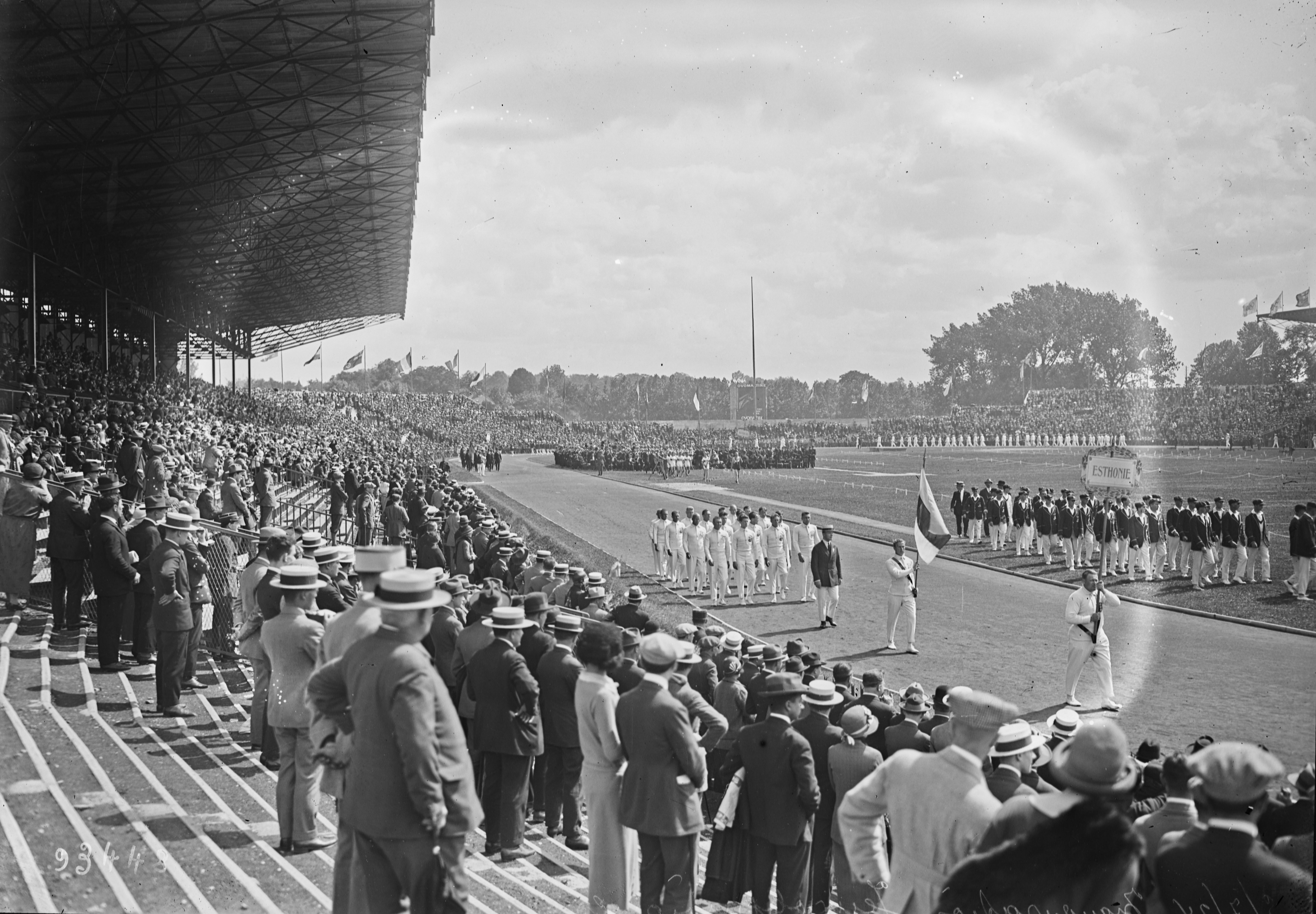
The flag and team of Estonia at the 1924 Summer Olympics in Paris (opening ceremony)

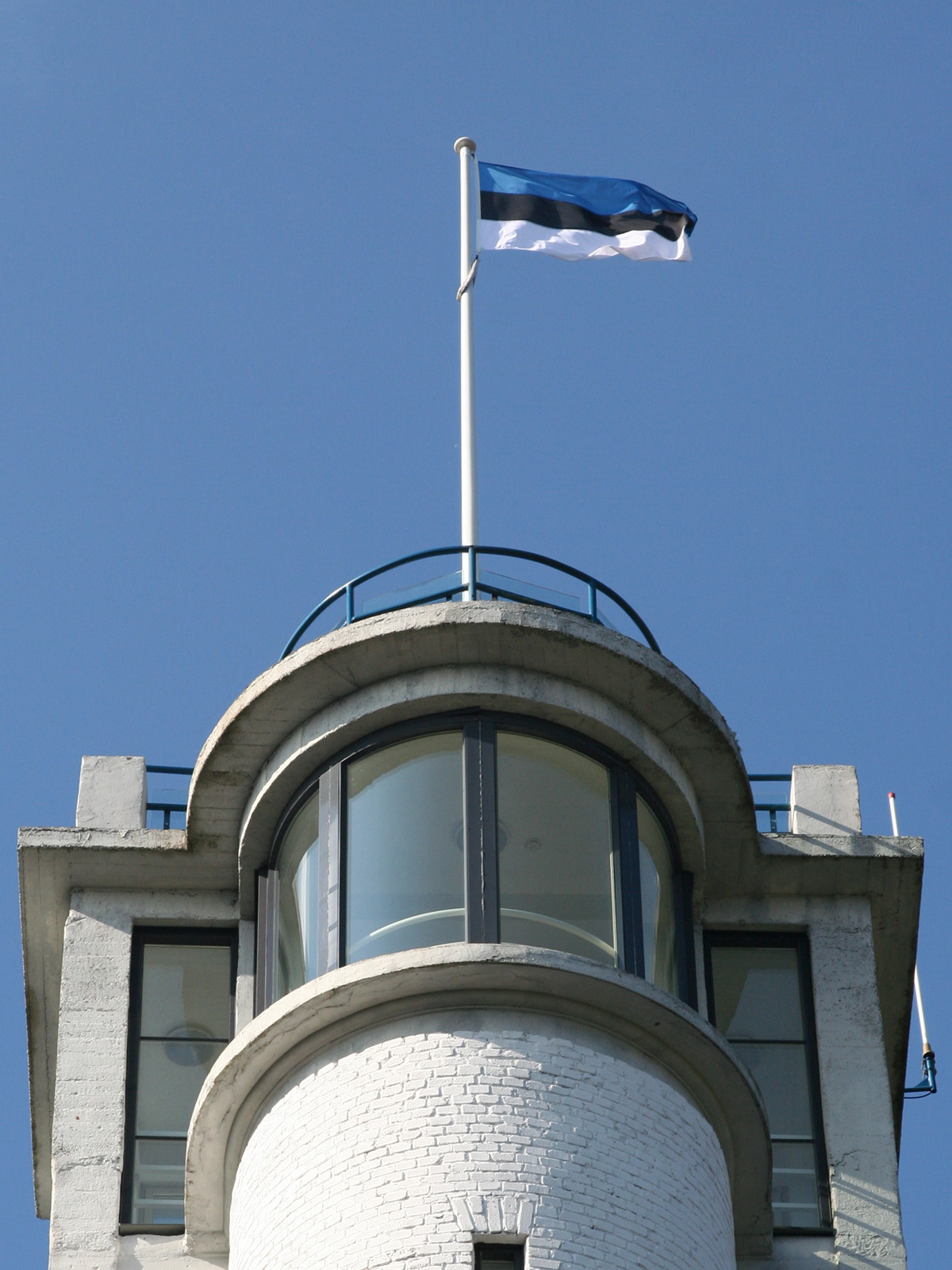
National flag on top of Suur Munamägi (the highest point in Estonia, at 318 metres (1,043 ft) above sea level; photo 2007)

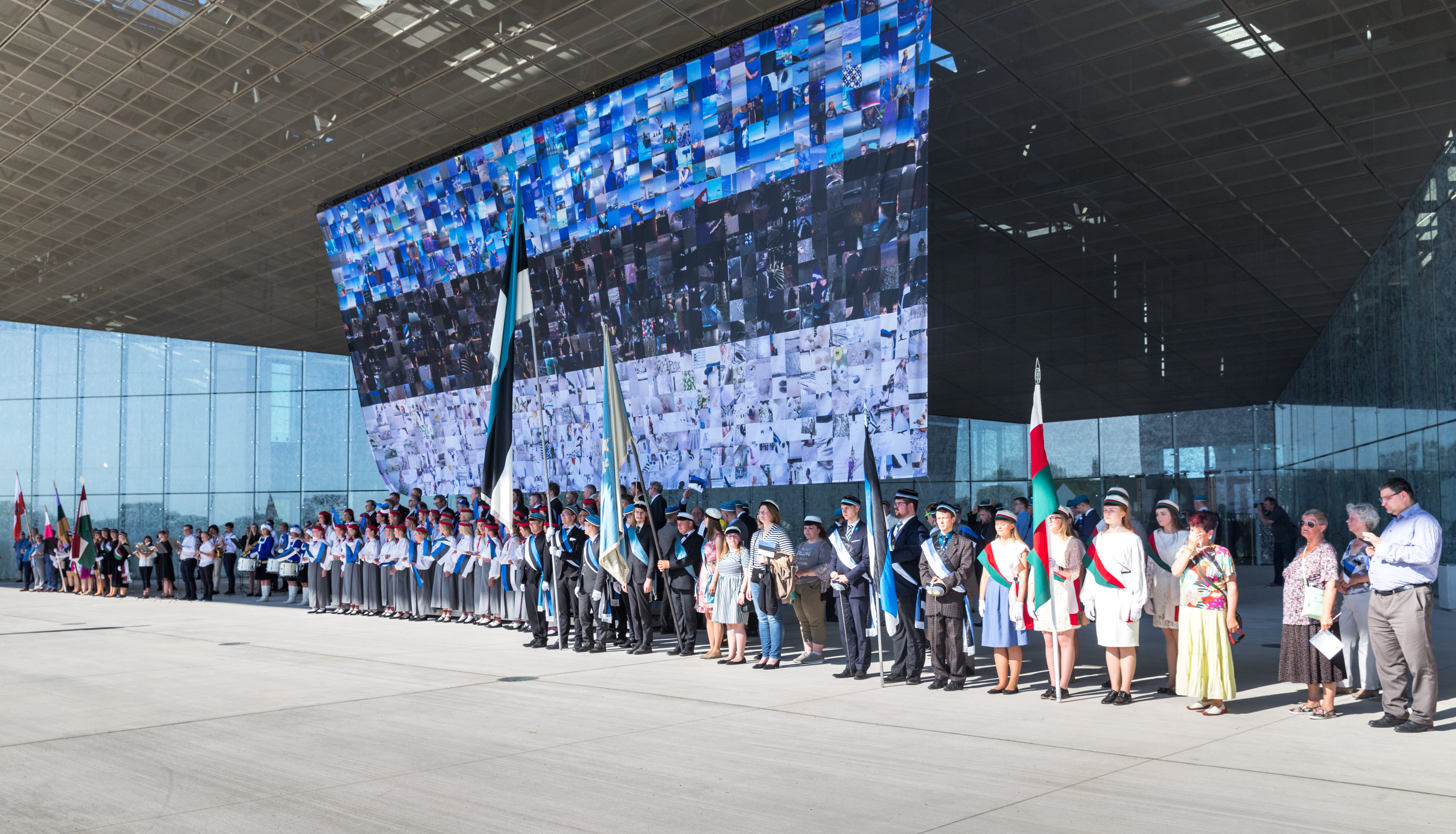
Celebration of the 135th anniversary of the Estonian flag (2019)

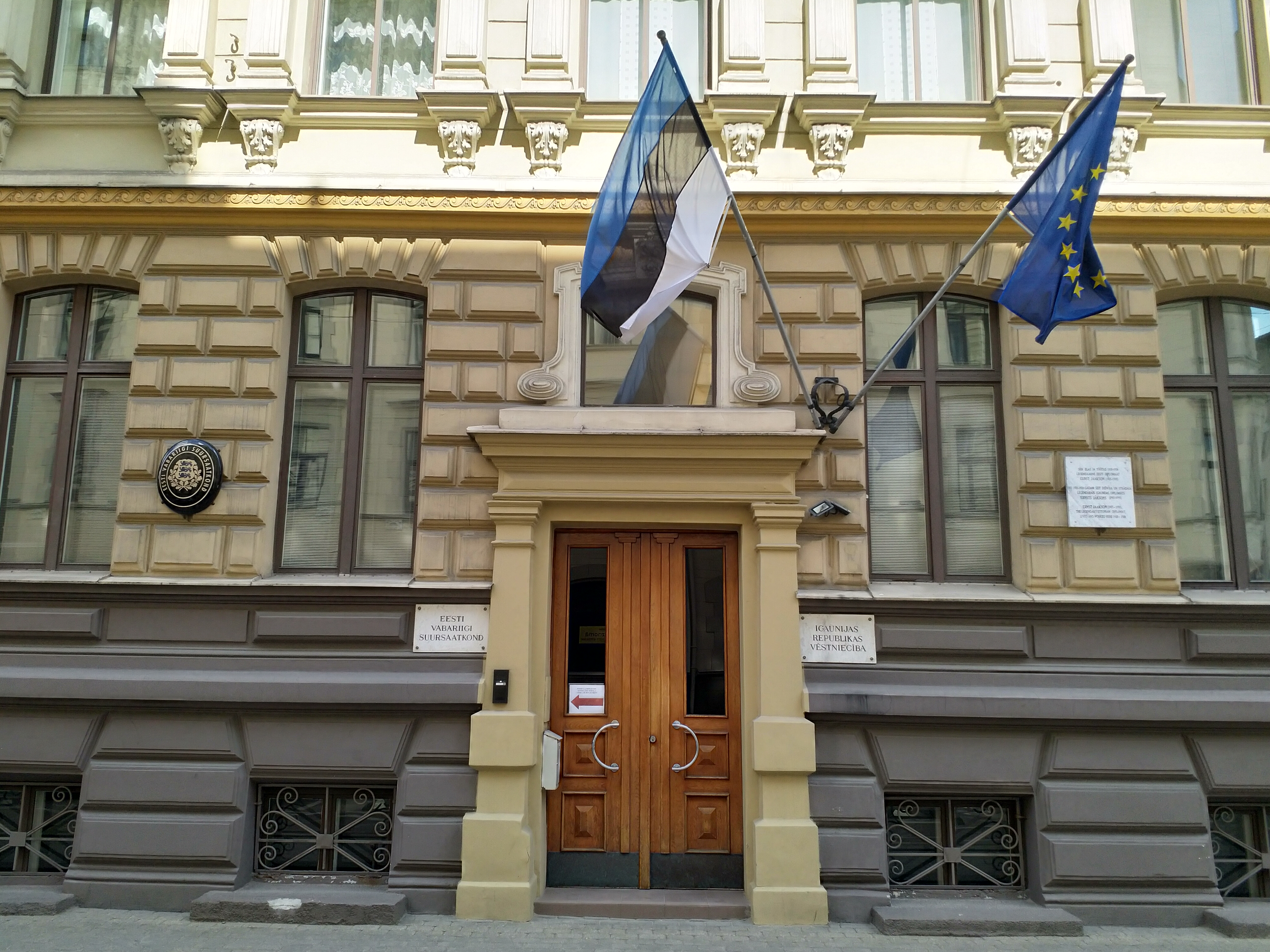
Flag of Estonia and flag of Europe (by the Estonian embassy in Riga, Latvia, 2021)

== See also ==
- National symbols of Estonia
- Coat of arms of Estonia
- Flags of Estonian counties
- List of Estonian flags
