= Enn Võrk =

Estonian conductor, composer and choir director (1905–1962)

- Born: 14 March 1905; Volkovysk, Grodno Governorate, Russian Empire
- Died: 20 September 1962 (aged 57); Tallinn, then part of Estonian SSR, Soviet Union
- Education: Tallinn Conservatory
- Occupations: Composer; conductor; organist
- Years active: 1926–1962

Enn Võrk (14 March 1905 – 20 September 1962) was an Estonian composer, conductor, and organist.

== Early life and education ==
Võrk was born on 14 March 1905 in Volkovysk, Grodno Governorate.

In 1926, he graduated from Tallinn Conservatory.

== Career ==
Between 1926–1933, he conducted Choir of St. John's Church in Tallinn. From 1926–1929, he conducted Radio Broadcasting Symphony Orchestra.

He has been the organist in Tallinn St. John's Church (1926–1933) and Rapla Church (1944–1950, 1955–1962).

Between 1945-1950 and from 1959, he was a member of Estonian Composers' Union.

== Death ==
Võrk died on 20 September 1905 in Tallinn.

== Works ==
- choral song "The Estonian Flag" (Eesti lipp)
- choral song "I Would Take a Flower Chain"
- choral song "The Singer"
- oratorio "Vigilate" (1957)
- String Quartet in G major (1926)
