= Toompea Castle =

Castle in Tallinn, Estonia

Coordinates: 59°26′08″N 24°44′14″E

- Toompea loss
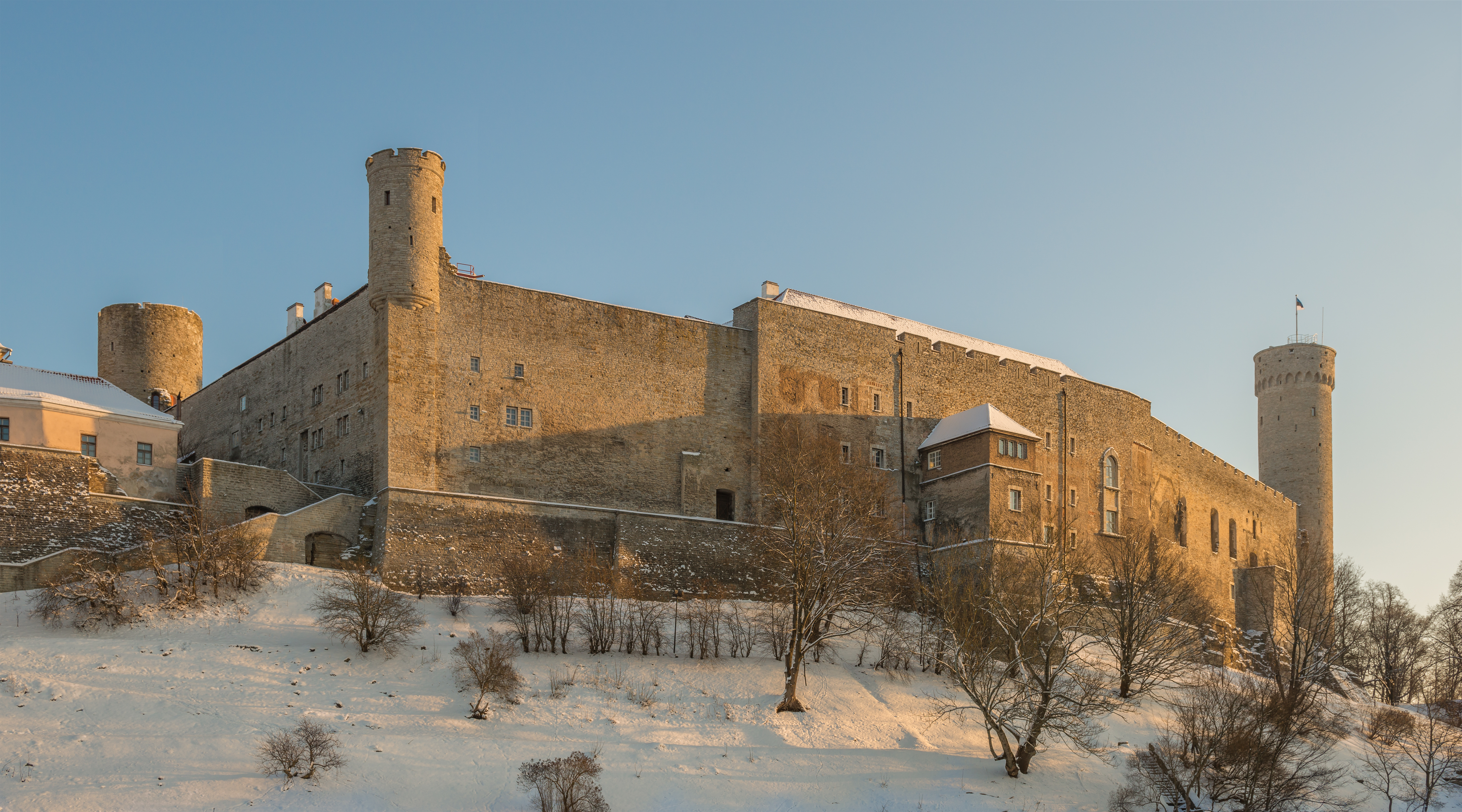
- Toompea castle in 2014

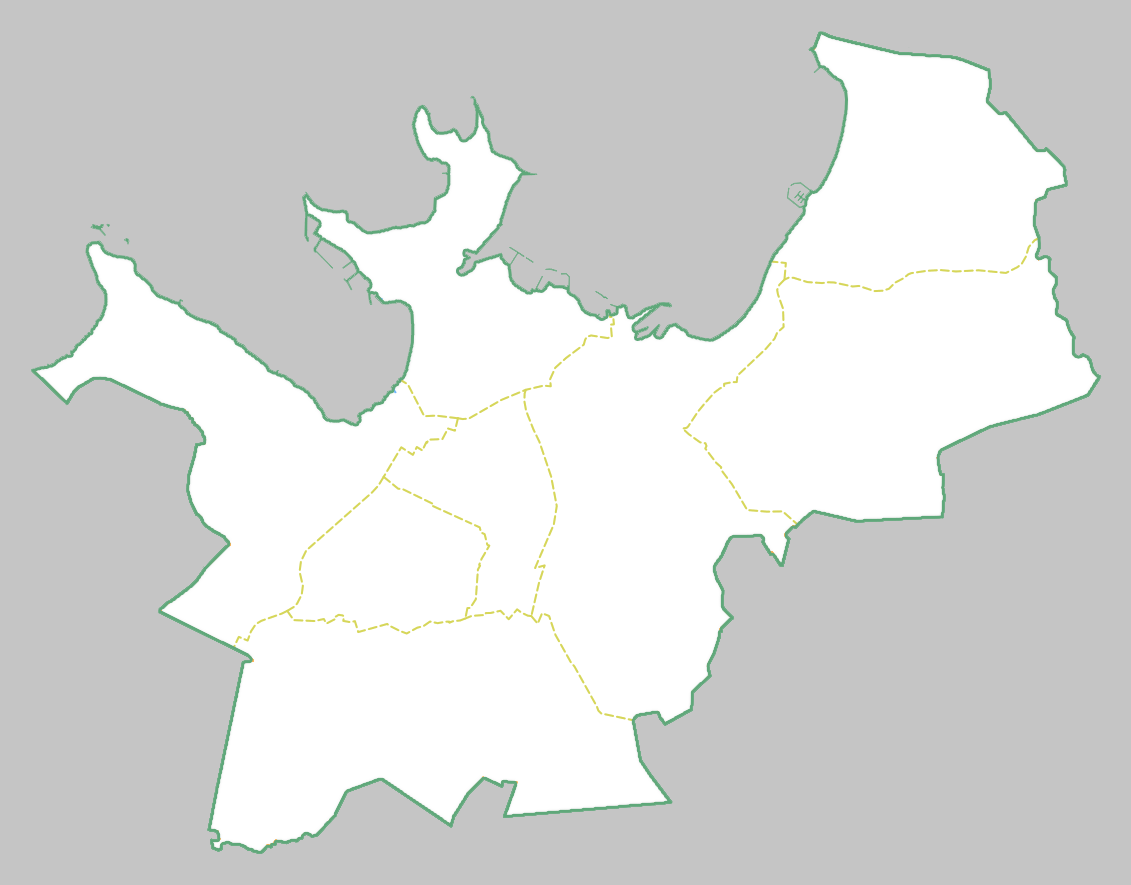
- Location within Tallinn.
- Interactive map of the Toompea Castle area

General information
- Location: Tallinn, Estonia
- Completed: 14th and 16th centuries

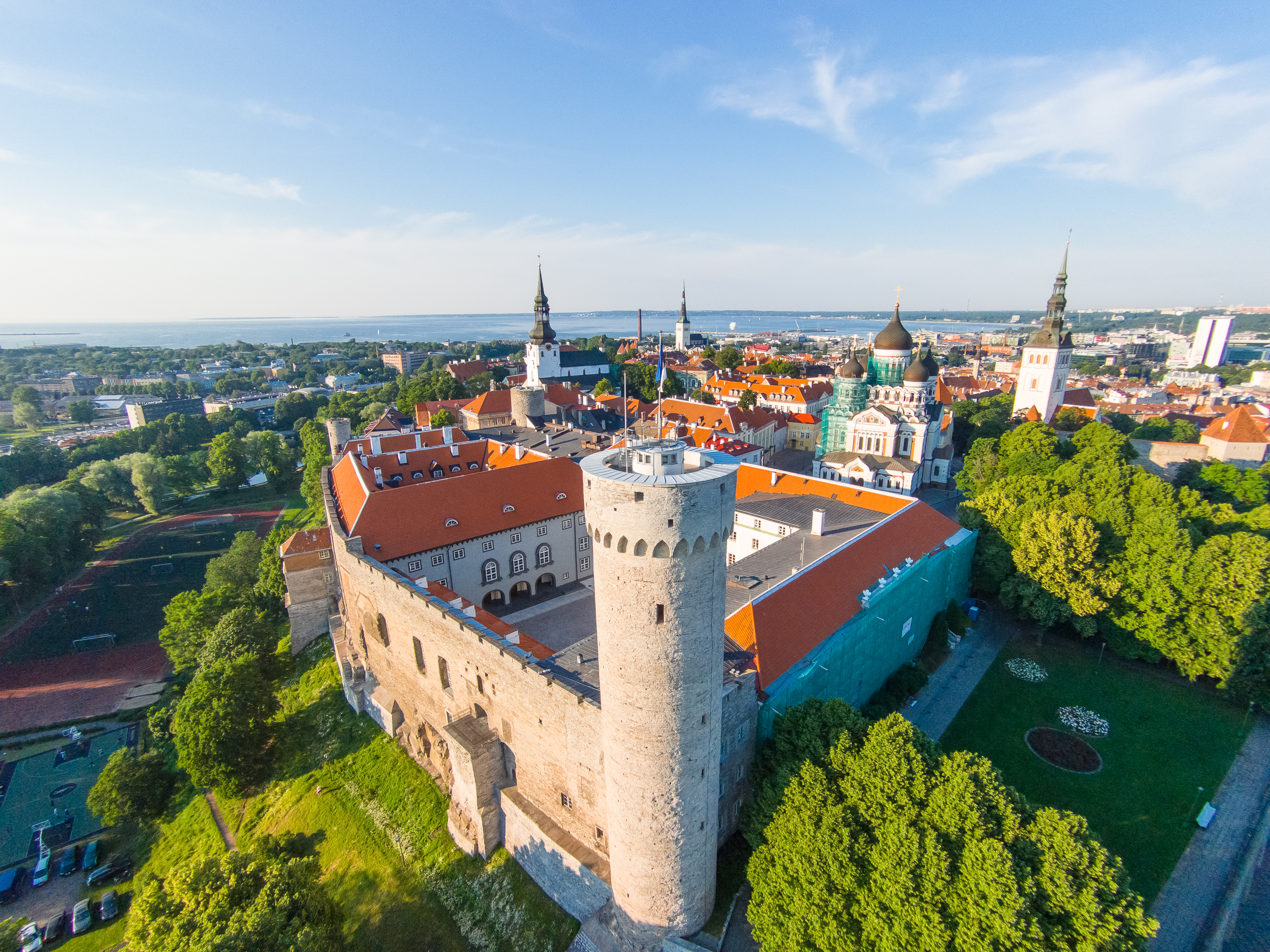
Toompea castle (2016) Photo: Stefan Hiienurm

Toompea castle (Estonian: Toompea loss) is a medieval castle on Toompea hill in the central part of Tallinn, the capital of Estonia. In modern times, it houses the Parliament of Estonia (Riigikogu).

== History ==
The Toompea castle's predecessor, an ancient Estonian stronghold had been in use since at least the 9th century AD. In 1219, the castle was taken over by Denmark's crusaders led by king Valdemar II. According to a popular Danish legend, the flag of Denmark (Dannebrog) fell from the sky during a critical stage of the battle (known as the Battle of Lindanise). This first proper castle was referred to as the "Castle of the Danes", in Latin castrum danorum and in contemporary archaic Estonian taani linna. From the latter, the modern name of the city of Tallinn is possibly derived (see also Tallinn § Names and etymology).

In 1227, the castle was taken over by the Order of the Brethren of the Sword, who initiated rebuilding schemes. The castle's reconstruction began in the 13th century and is to a large extent the castle that can be seen today. The castle again fell to Denmark just ten years later, in 1237, but was sold to the Teutonic Order in 1346, and would remain in their hands for the remainder of the Middle Ages.

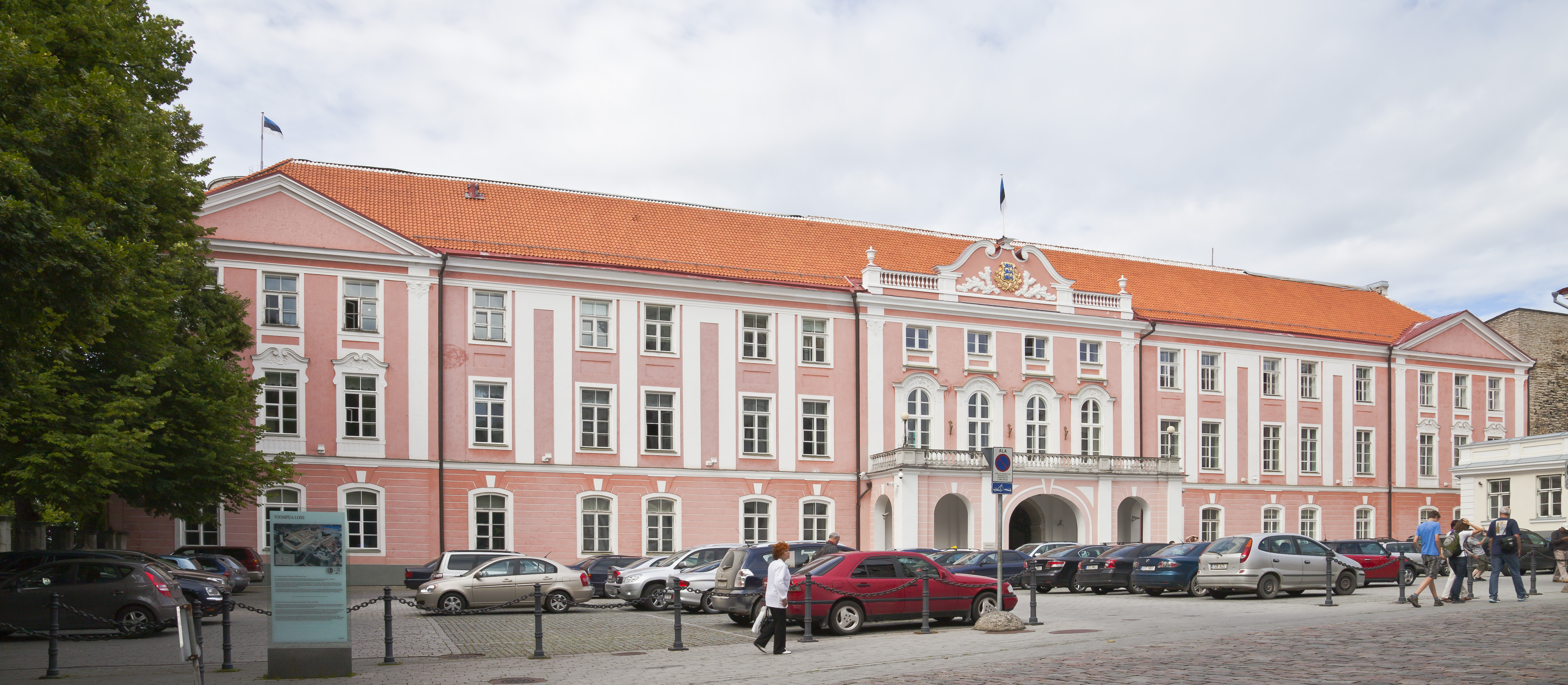
18th century, Baroque additions to the castle

As the crusading Teutonic Order was a religious order, the castle came to resemble a monastery in several ways. It included a chapel, a chapter house and a dormitory for the knights. The order was also responsible for erecting the still visible towers of the castle, including "Pilsticker" (translated as "arrow-sharpener"), "Stür den Kerl" ("ward off the enemy"), "Landskrone" ("crown of the land"), and "Langer Hermann" (in Estonian Pikk Hermann or "Tall Hermann"). Tall Hermann is 48 metres (157 ft) tall and dominates the castle skyline. The flag of Estonia is hoisted at the top of the tower every day at sunrise, to the sound of the national anthem, and lowered at sunset.

After the Protestant Reformation and many wars that followed in the 16th century, the Teutonic Order lost its last possessions in Estonia and the region became contested by Sweden, Poland and Muscovy (Russia). By 1561, northern Estonia had become part of the Kingdom of Sweden. The Swedish rulers transformed the castle from a medieval fortress into a ceremonial and administrative centre of political power in Estonia, a purpose the castle has served ever since.

In 1710, Sweden lost the territory of modern-day Estonia to the Tsardom of Russia. Subsequently a number of larger reconstruction schemes were carried out and the building complex was effectively turned from a castle into a palace. A new dominating wing in Baroque and Neoclassical style, designed by Johann Schultz, was added in the eastern part of the complex. It housed the provincial administration of the Governorate of Estonia and the living quarters of the imperial governor. In the 19th century, a public park was also created and to the south-east of the castle, and an archive building erected nearby.

== Parliament building ==
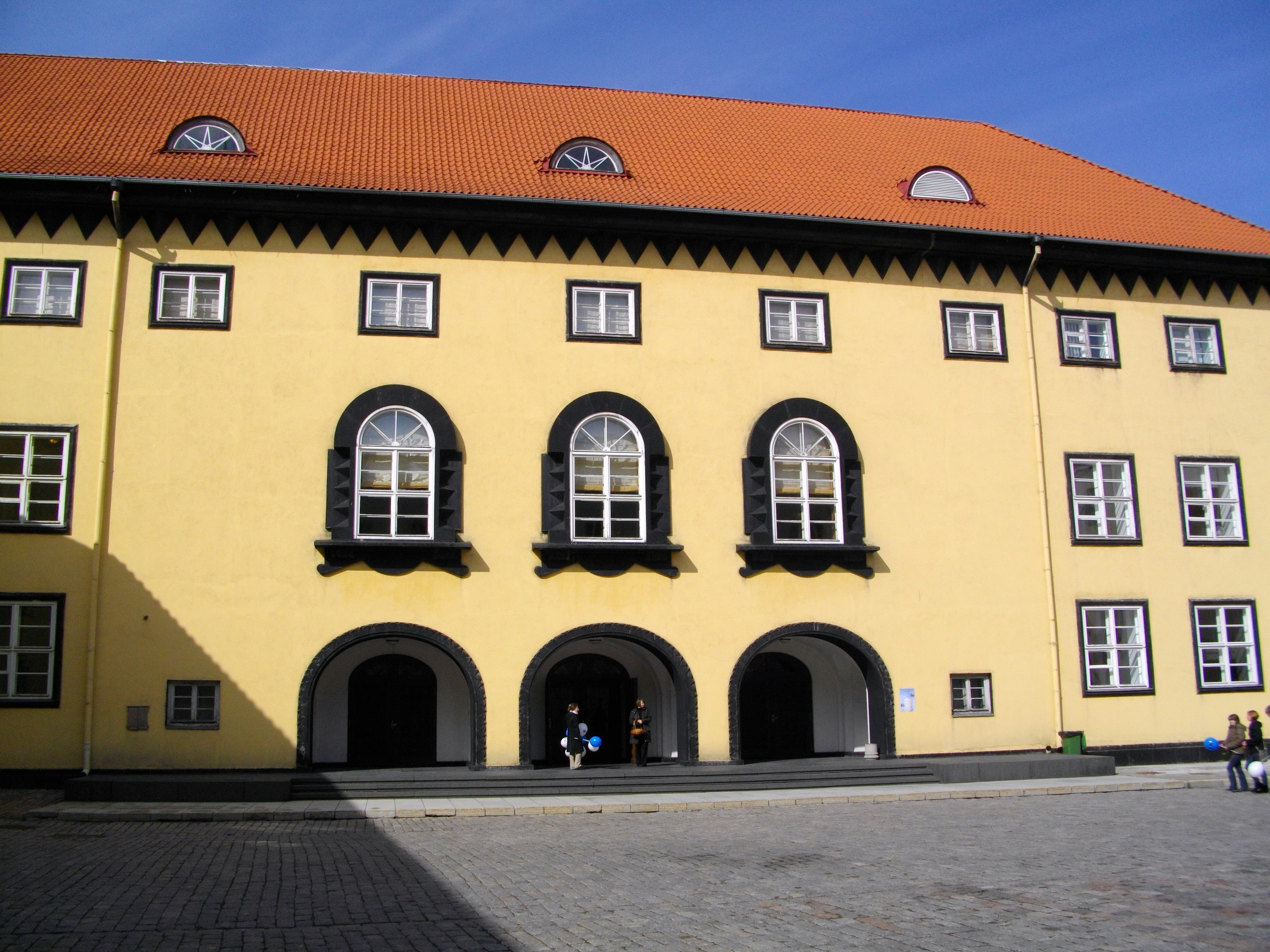
Estonian parliament building which was constructed in 1922

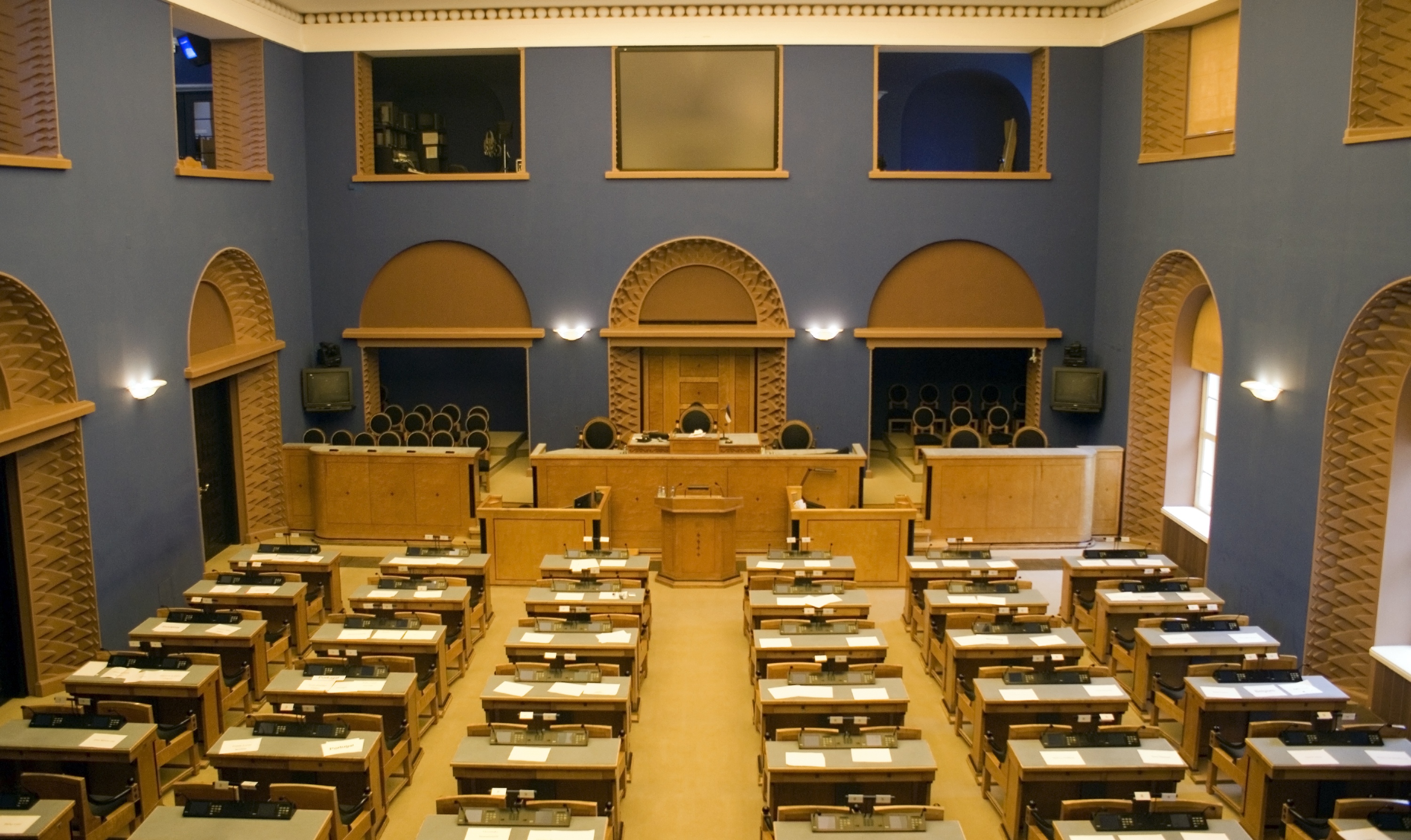
Session hall.

After Estonia became independent in 1918, the government decided to build a new house for the nation's parliament (Riigikogu) at the site of the former convent building of the Teutonic Order. Taking two years to complete, the parliament building, designed by architects Eugen Habermann and Herbert Johanson, was finished in 1922. Although its exterior is traditionalist, the interior is Expressionist in style - the world's only Expressionist parliament building.

After June 1940, during the period of foreign occupations — by the Soviet Union until 1941, by Nazi Germany in 1941—1944, and then again by the Soviet Union after 1944 — the democratically elected parliament of Estonia was disbanded. The castle and the building of Riigikogu were however used by the local Supreme Soviet, the formal rubber stamp legislative body of Soviet-occupied Estonia without any substantive meaning, between 1947 and 1990.

== Popular culture ==
According to a legend, recorded in the 19th century, the entire hill of Toompea was once upon a time created by a mythological heroine Linda who built it boulder-by-boulder with her own hands.

== See also ==
- History of Estonia
- Politics of Estonia
- List of castles in Estonia

== Bibliography ==
- Ruusing, Helle, ed. (2008). Toompea Castle. Riigikogu Kantslei. ISBN 978-9985-9531-7-4.
