= Toompea =

Hill in central Tallinn, Estonia

Coordinates: 59°26′13″N 24°44′24″E

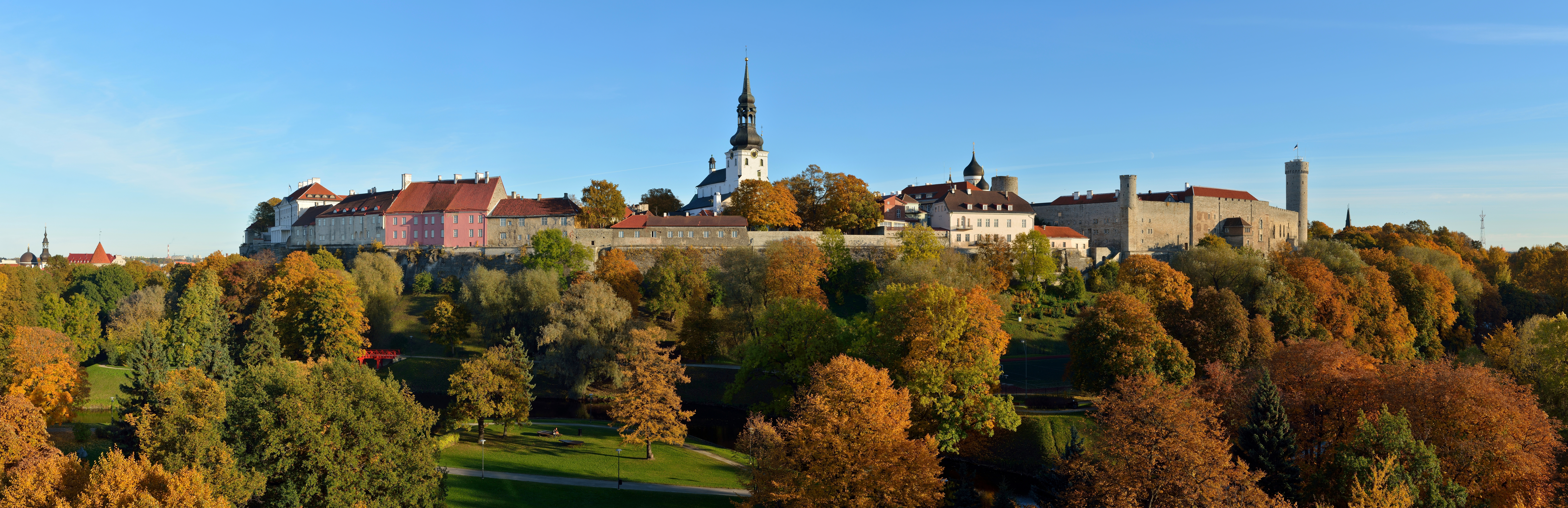
View of the Toompea hill, 2013.

Toompea (from German: Domberg, "Cathedral Hill") is a hill in the central part of Tallinn, the capital city of Estonia. The hill has an area of 7 hectares (17 acres) and is about 20–30 metres higher than the surrounding areas. Toompea is part of the medieval Tallinn Old Town, a UNESCO World Heritage Site.

Toompea is the site of the Government of Estonia and the Riigikogu (parliament), both of which are often simply referred to as Toompea. The parliament meets in Toompea Castle, which is situated in the southwestern corner of the hill and is topped by the Pikk Hermann ("Tall Hermann") tower. The flag on top of the tower is one of the best-known symbols in Estonia of the government in power.

Toompea first emerged as an island from the Baltic Ice Lake around 10,000 years ago. Due to steady post-glacial rebound, it became connected with the mainland during the early Littorina Sea stage. In 5,000 BCE the sea still reached the foot of the cliffs of Toompea. The modern coastline is more than 1 km from Toompea, and the foot of the hill lies 17–20 m above sea level. The hill reaches about 48 metres (157 ft) in elevation.

== History ==
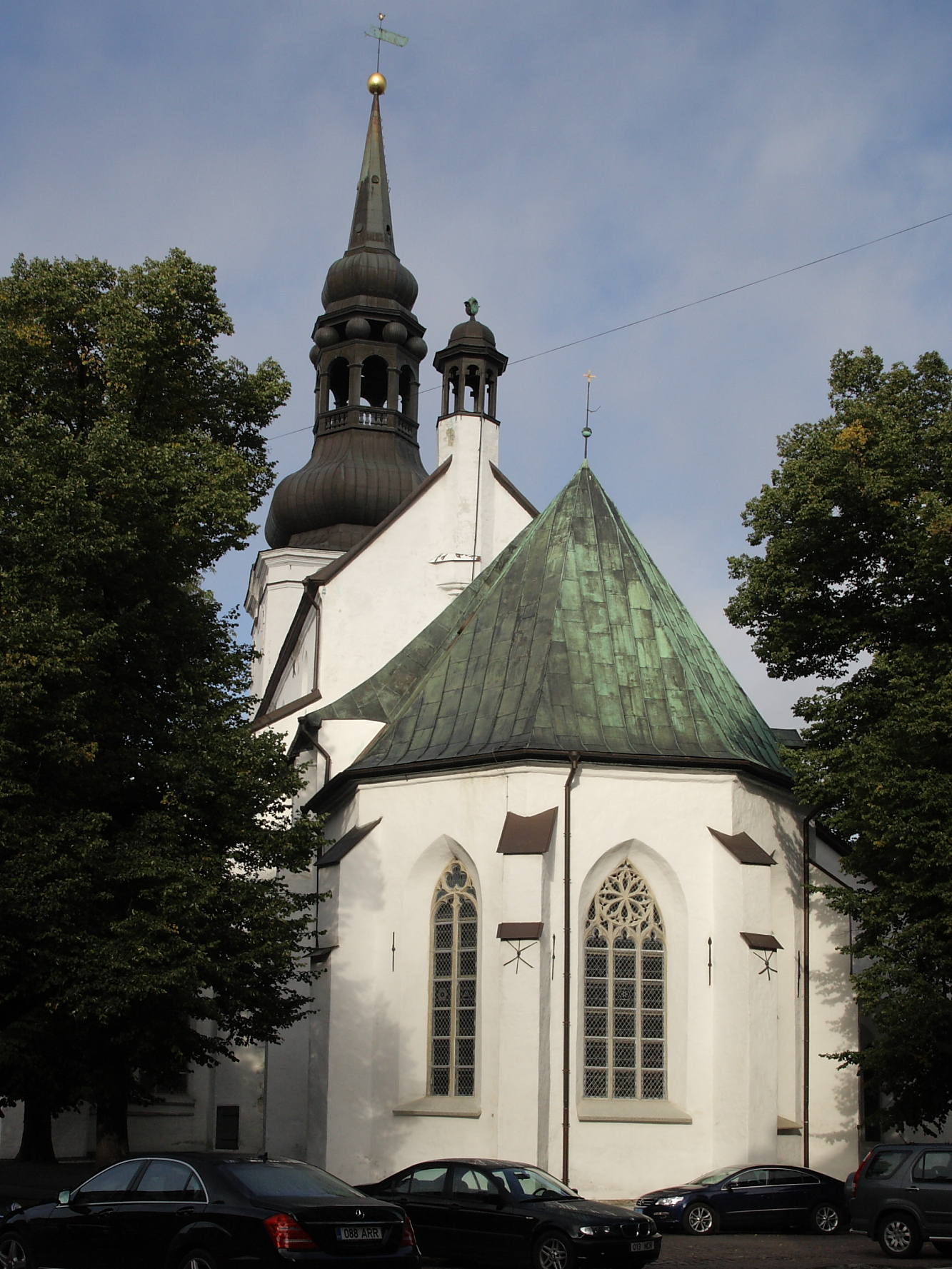
Toompea (Domberg) derives its name from the 13th century Cathedral church (Estonian: Toomkirik, German: Domkirche)

The first stronghold is believed to have been built on the hill in either the 10th or 11th century by residents of the ancient Estonian county of Revala. The late Iron Age fortified settlement probably did not have permanent inhabitants, but was rather used seasonally for protecting the harbour and its adjacent marketplace. The exact location of the stronghold is not known, but it is presumed that it occupied only a small portion of Toompea, either its then-highest point slightly southeast of today's cathedral or the northern end of the hill. Early archaeological evidence from the hill dates mainly to the second half of the 12th century and the first half of the 13th century. Smaller amounts of older finds support the view that the stronghold might have been established as early as the Viking Age.

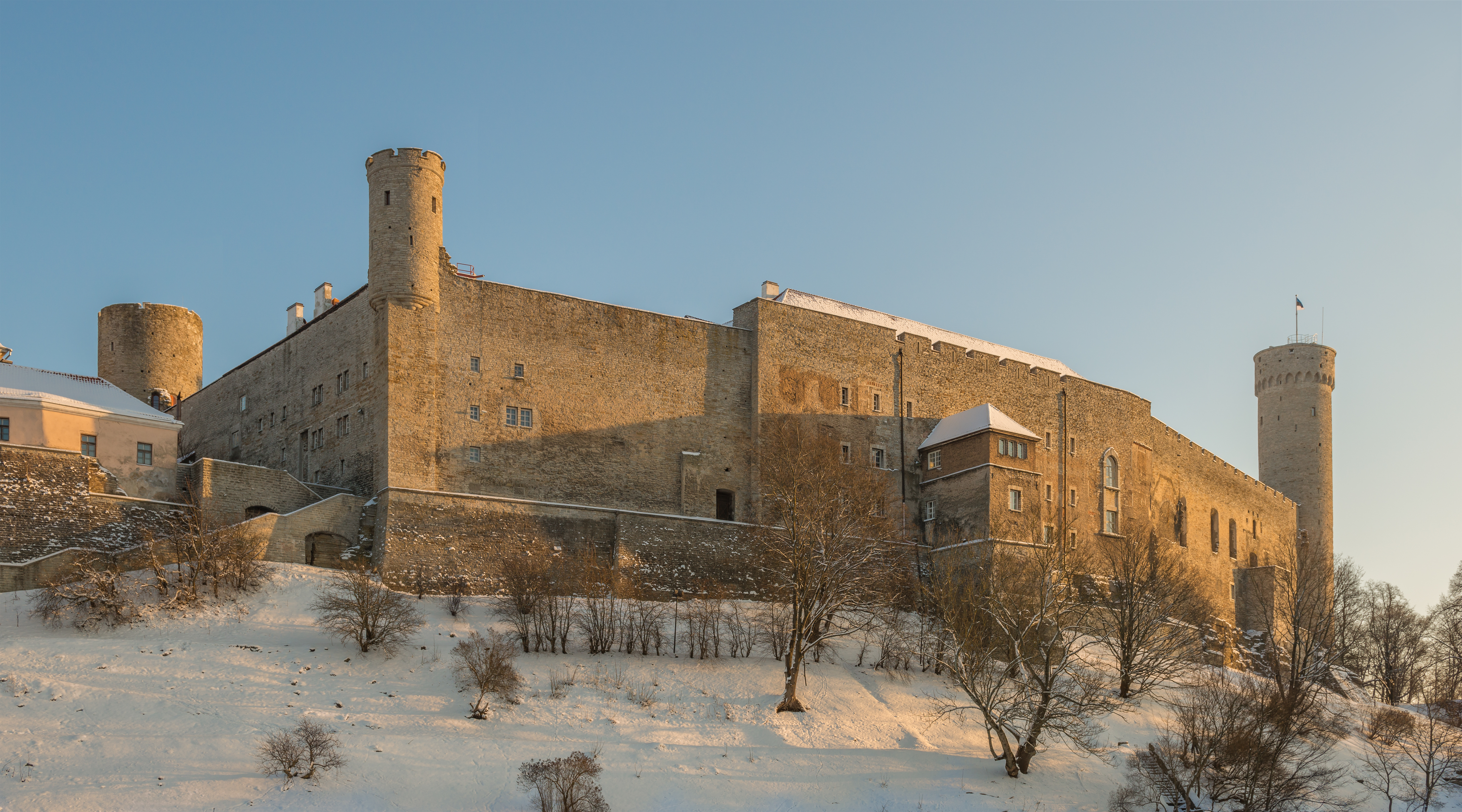
Toompea Castle

The hill fort is mentioned in the Henry of Livonia's Chronicle of the Livonian Crusade by the name Lindanise. As part of the crusade, in the summer of 1219 the King of Denmark, Valdemar II, launched an attack against Tallinn. His crusaders took over the deserted stronghold and that same summer started building a new castle in its place, later referred to as the Castrum Danorum. After the Battle of Lindanise, which was fought near the castle and resulted in a Danish victory over the Estonians, a cathedral was also built on the hill, though it was probably not located in the same place as today's cathedral.

In the summer of 1227 the castle at Toompea was conquered by the Brothers of the Sword, who started to fortify the hill immediately after the conquest. The plateau was divided into three parts: the Small Castle, the Great Castle and the outer ward (the southernmost part of the plateau in front of the two castles). The first stone Castle of the Order (the Small Castle) was built in the southwestern corner of the plateau in 1227-1229. The original castle had roughly the same shape as the later expansions of the castle, but was slightly smaller. The castle was returned to Denmark after the Treaty of Stensby in 1238 and remained its property (together with the rest of Northern Estonia – see Danish Estonia) for the next 138 years. In 1240 the construction of the cathedral was completed on the site where it stands today. In the second half of the 13th century Toompea (the Great Castle) was surrounded by a wall along the hill's perimeter, built mainly by vassals who owned the plots there.

Beginning in the same period, Toompea started to develop into the centre of provincial authority, clergy and nobility in Northern Estonia. Most of the vassals chose Toompea for their residence, as living on their estates in the conquered countryside was deemed too dangerous. By the end of the 13th century the Great Castle was densely populated. The distinction between Toompea and the Lower Town (Tallinn) also developed at the time as Tallinn gained its own administration – at least by 1248, when the King of Denmark, Eric IV, granted the town Lübeck city rights, but possibly even earlier. In 1265 the Lower Town was exempted from the rule of the castellan, and in 1288 the commanders of the castle also lost judicial power over the citizens of the Lower Town.

Construction and expansion works on both castles continued in the subsequent centuries. In the first half of the 14th century the southern wall of the Great Castle was renovated and its moat was joined with the eastern moat of the Small Castle. In this way the outer ward of the castles was formed, after its southern and southeastern sides were surrounded with a wall. The castle as a whole had two exits at the time. The more important one was the outer ward's southern gate, through which the road led to Tõnismägi; the second was the gate on its eastern side, which connected Toompea with the Lower Town via the Long and Short Legs.

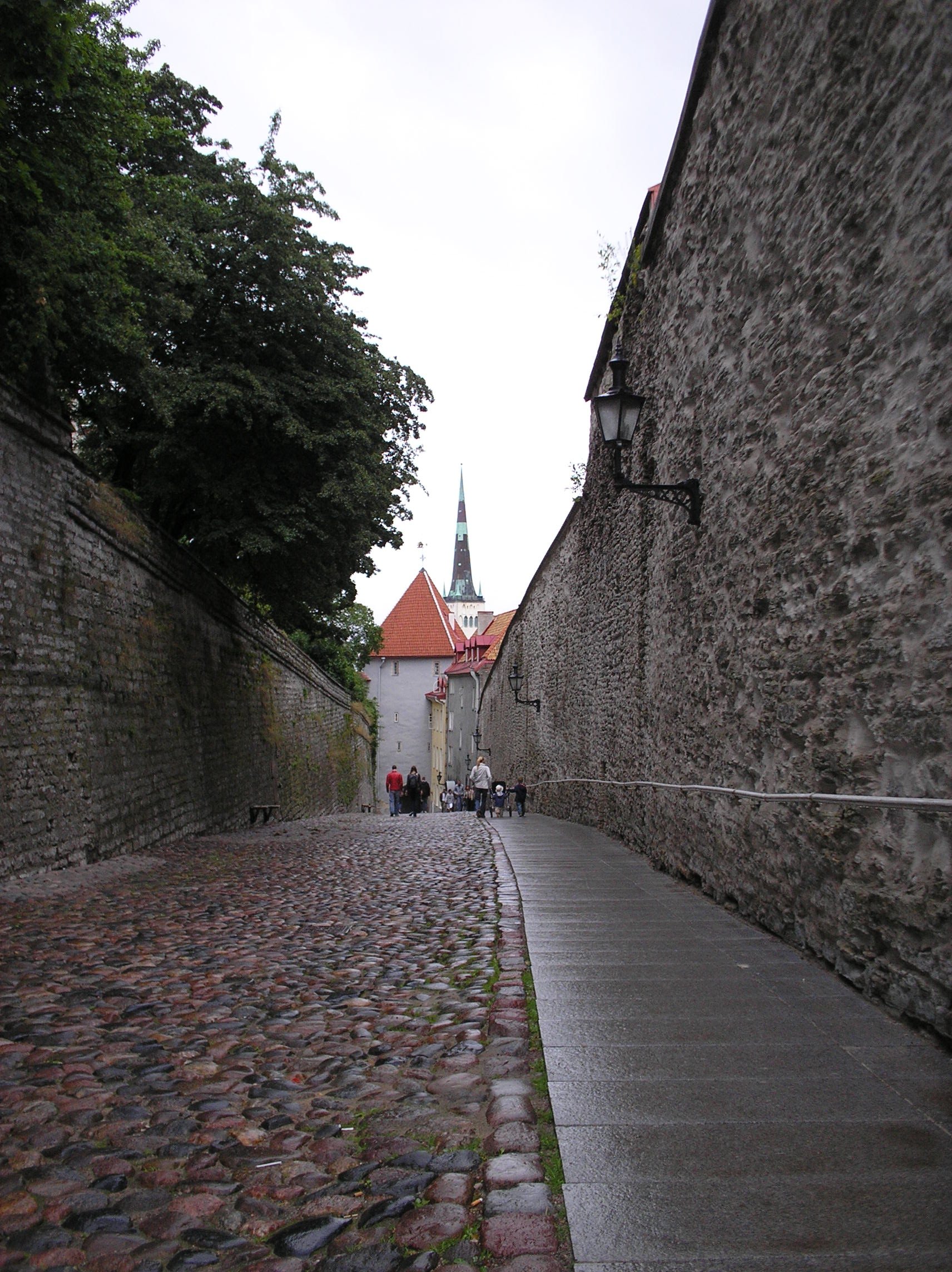
The Long Leg, the main way connecting Toompea with the Lower Town

In the aftermath of the St. George's Night Uprising, in 1346 Denmark sold its possessions in Northern Estonia, which were then ruled by the Livonian Order for the following 215 years. Tallinn (the Lower Town), which was still subject to Lübeck city rights and only nominally depended on the feudal system, developed into a flourishing Hanseatic city, while Toompea remained politically and socially antithetical to the Lower Town. The boundaries of the territory of Toompea and Tallinn were fixed by an agreement in 1348, when 220 hectares (540 acres) from the city's patrimony was given to Toompea. That area, located southwest of the hill, where the suburbs (Vorstadt) of Toompea (Tõnismäe, Kassisaba and Kelmiküla) were built during subsequent periods, was called "Dome territory" until the 20th century.

Soon after returning to Toompea, the Order started expanding the castle – the whole Castle of the Order (German: Ordensburg) was extended and developed into the strongest centre of its northerly realms, a symbol of their military and political power. New, higher outer walls were built, and moats were widened and deepened. The first part of the Pikk Hermann ("Tall Hermann") tower, which tops the Toompea castle, was completed by 1371. Pikk Hermann was the first tower in Tallinn adapted for defence in the era of firearms. Later, in the 16th century, the tower was rebuilt taller than its original height of 35 m. The wall of the Great Castle was also fortified with new towers: altogether 14 defence towers (including a gate tower named Clock Tower – the only exit) had been built along its wall by the end of the 14th century.

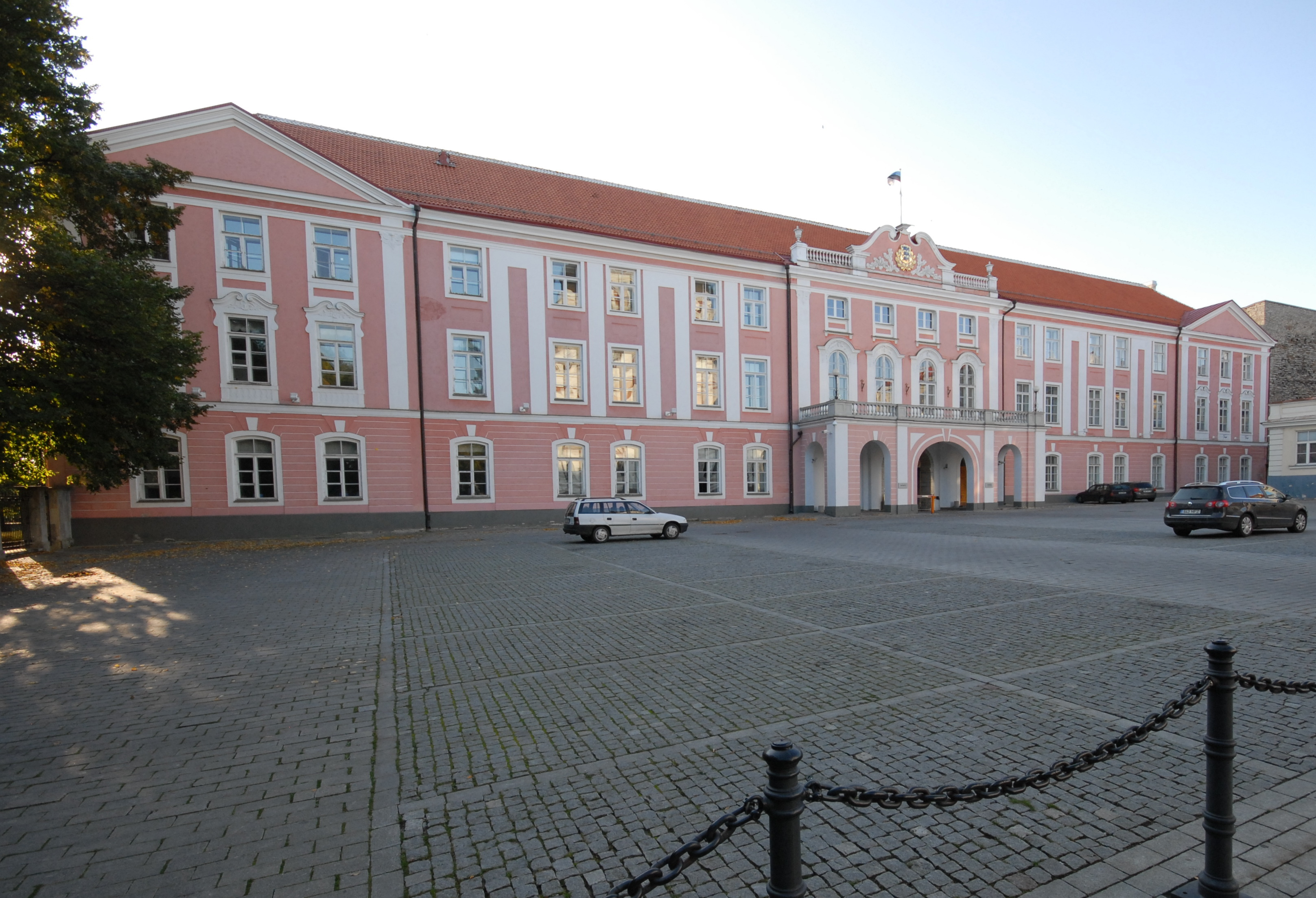
The front façade of the Estonian Parliament, the Riigikogu, is a wing of Toompea Castle built in 1767-1773

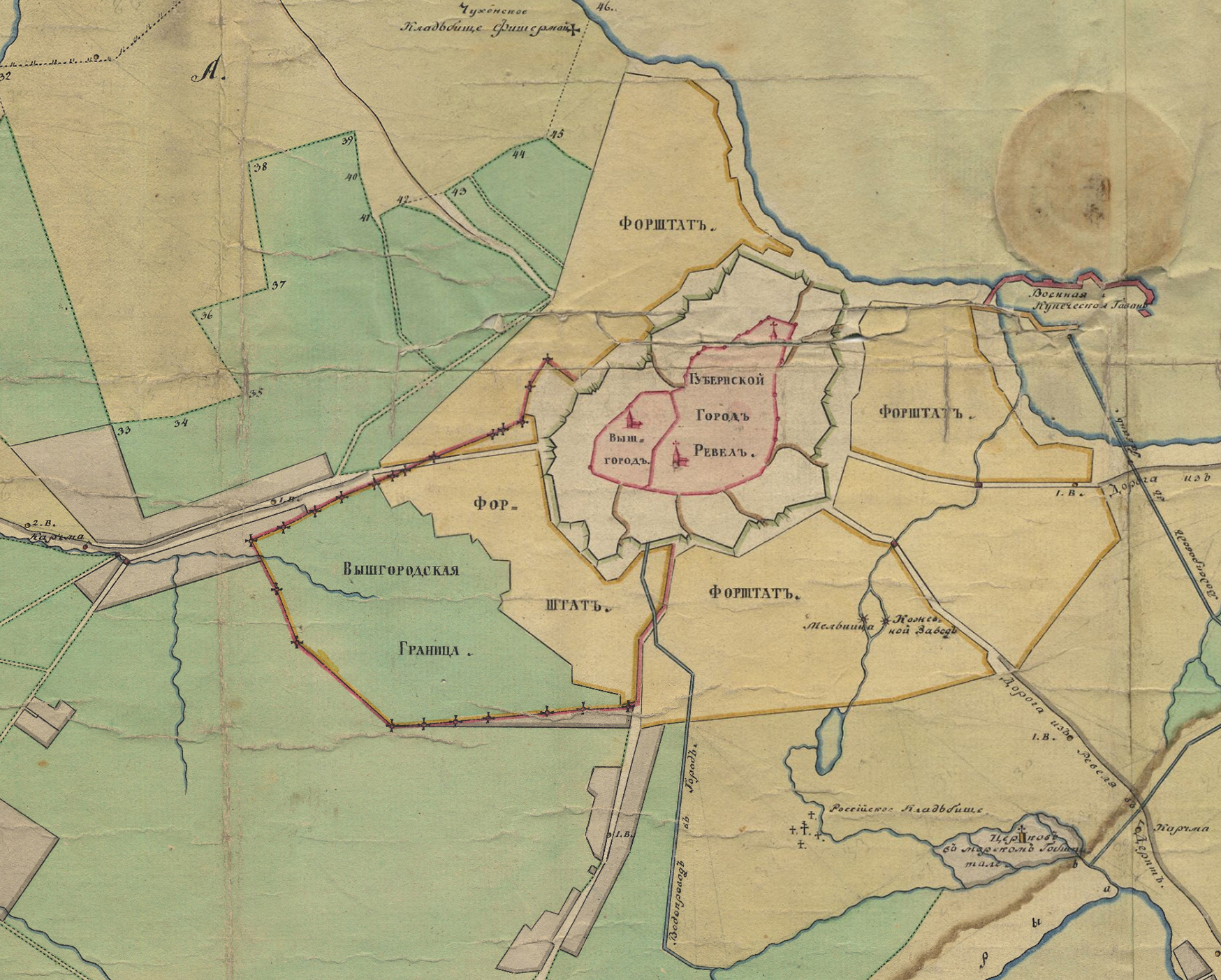
An early 19th century map showing the border between the territories of Toompea and the Lower Town

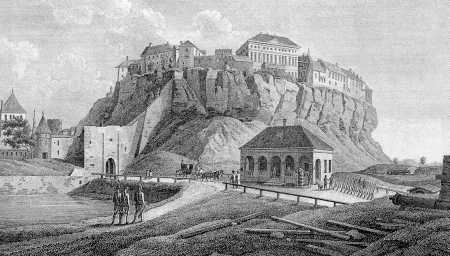
View of Toompea from the sea in 1823 (author unknown)

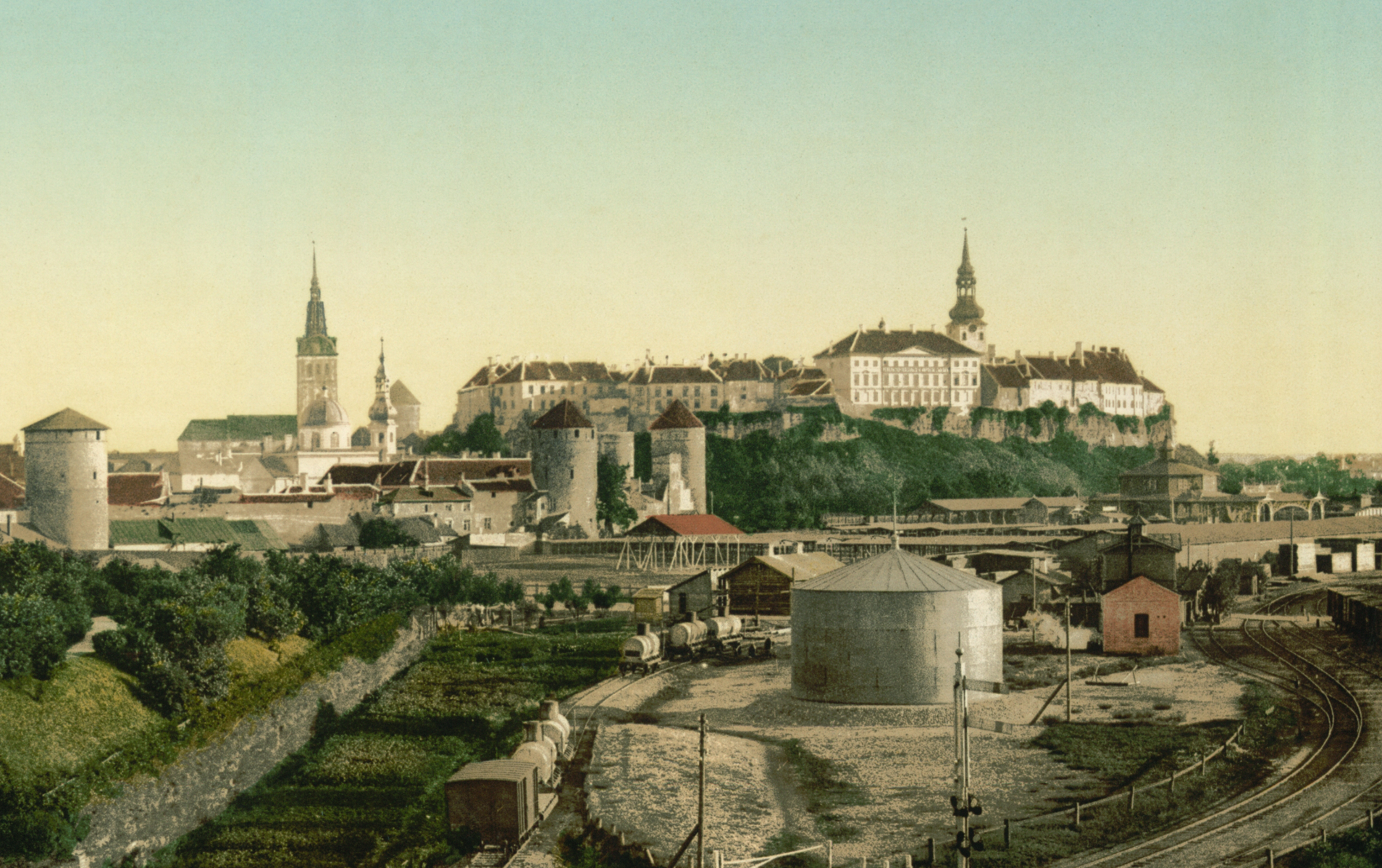
View of Toompea from the north, end of 19th century

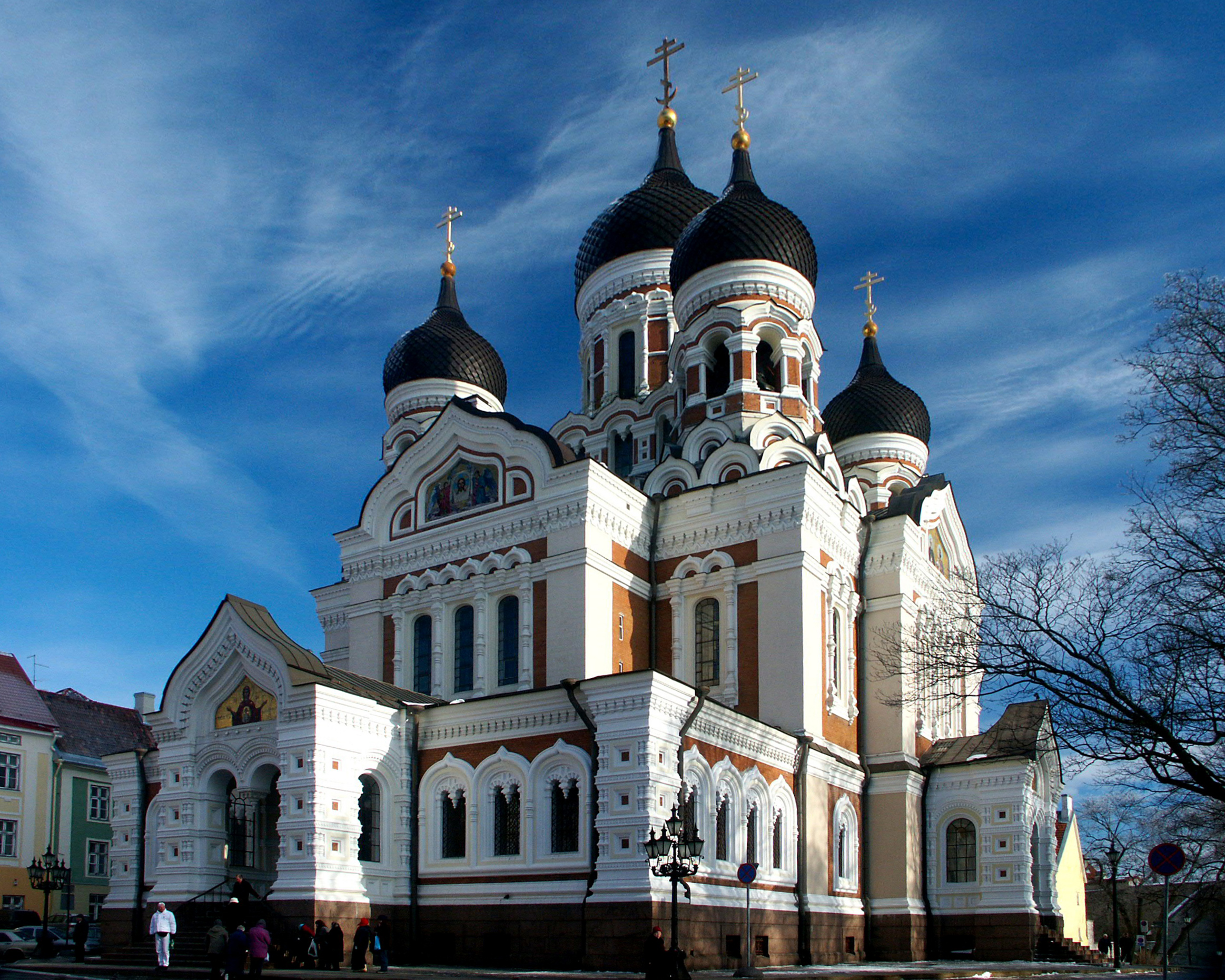
The Orthodox Alexander Nevsky Cathedral built in 1894-1900.

The Kingdom of Sweden conquered northern Estonia in 1561 and held it until the Great Northern War, when Tallinn was conquered by the Tsardom of Russia in 1710. When Tallinn capitulated to Eric XIV of Sweden in 1561, the king decided not to change the status quo in the relations between Toompea and the Lower Town. Toompea, as a separate town (Dom zu Reval) under its own administration, was able to retain a variety of special rights and privileges, the last of which remained in the books until 1889. Toompea was joined with Tallinn (Lower Town) only in 1878, when, during the period of Russification, the previous laws governing the two towns were replaced with Russian administrative law. The two parts of the town had also been united for a brief period in 1785-1796. Toompea and the Lower Town had been united into a single police district in 1805. A separate private law remained in force for Toompea until 1944.

In 1684, Toompea suffered the most devastating fire in its history. Toompea had been affected by earlier fires in 1288, 1433, 1553 and 1581, but the fire of 1684 was much larger in scale, destroying most of the buildings in the Great Castle, including the cathedral. The Small Castle escaped the fire intact. The fires are one reason why Toompea looks architecturally different from, and newer than, the Lower Town.

At the end of the 17th century several plans were made to strengthen the fortifications of Toompea and Tallinn with earthworks and modern bastions. Although a design by Erik Dahlbergh was approved in 1686, construction was slow due to financial difficulties, and by the start of the Great Northern War only two of the intended bastions had been completed around Toompea – the Swedish Bastion and the Ingermanland Bastion, both protecting Toompea from the south.

Following the Great Northern War and the conquest of Estonia by the Russian Empire, the first half of the 18th century was a period of general neglect for Toompea and also for the castle, which fell into disuse for several decades. The situation changed in the second half of the 18th century: in 1767-1773 the east wing of the castle was completely rebuilt into an administrative building of the Governorate of Estonia by the orders of Catherine II. To construct the building, the southeastern tower of the castle (Stür den Kerl) was demolished and the moats were filled in; at the same time, the outer ward of the castles was redesigned as a square (the Castle Square, Estonian: Lossi plats). The building resembled an aristocratic palace, which led to the castle acquiring an alternative name: Toompea Palace. The Stenbock House, one of the most notable buildings on the northern ledge of Toompea, was also built in the same period; the intended court house was probably completed by 1792.

Tallinn was removed from the list of fortified towns of the Russian Empire in 1857. This allowed three new roads to be built from the southern end of Toompea over the previous defence structures: the Falgi Road, built in 1856–1857, led west to Paldiski Highway; Toompea Street (1860–1861) led south to Tõnismägi; and Komandandi Street led east, close to Harju Gate, where the Independence War Victory Column stands today.

The general appearance of Toompea changed greatly when the architecturally distinct Russian Orthodox Alexander Nevsky Cathedral was built in 1894-1900. The cathedral, situated on the Castle Square in front of the Toompea Palace, was erected during the period of Russification as a symbol of czarist rule and Russian dominance. Due to its prominent location and distinctly Russian style, the cathedral faced opposition even while it was being built, and in the late 1920s and the 1930s, in the independent Republic of Estonia, there were proposals to demolish it.

In 1903, when the Patkuli stairs were built near the northern end of the hill, Toompea gained a new access route from the direction of the main railway station of Tallinn.

== Toompea today ==
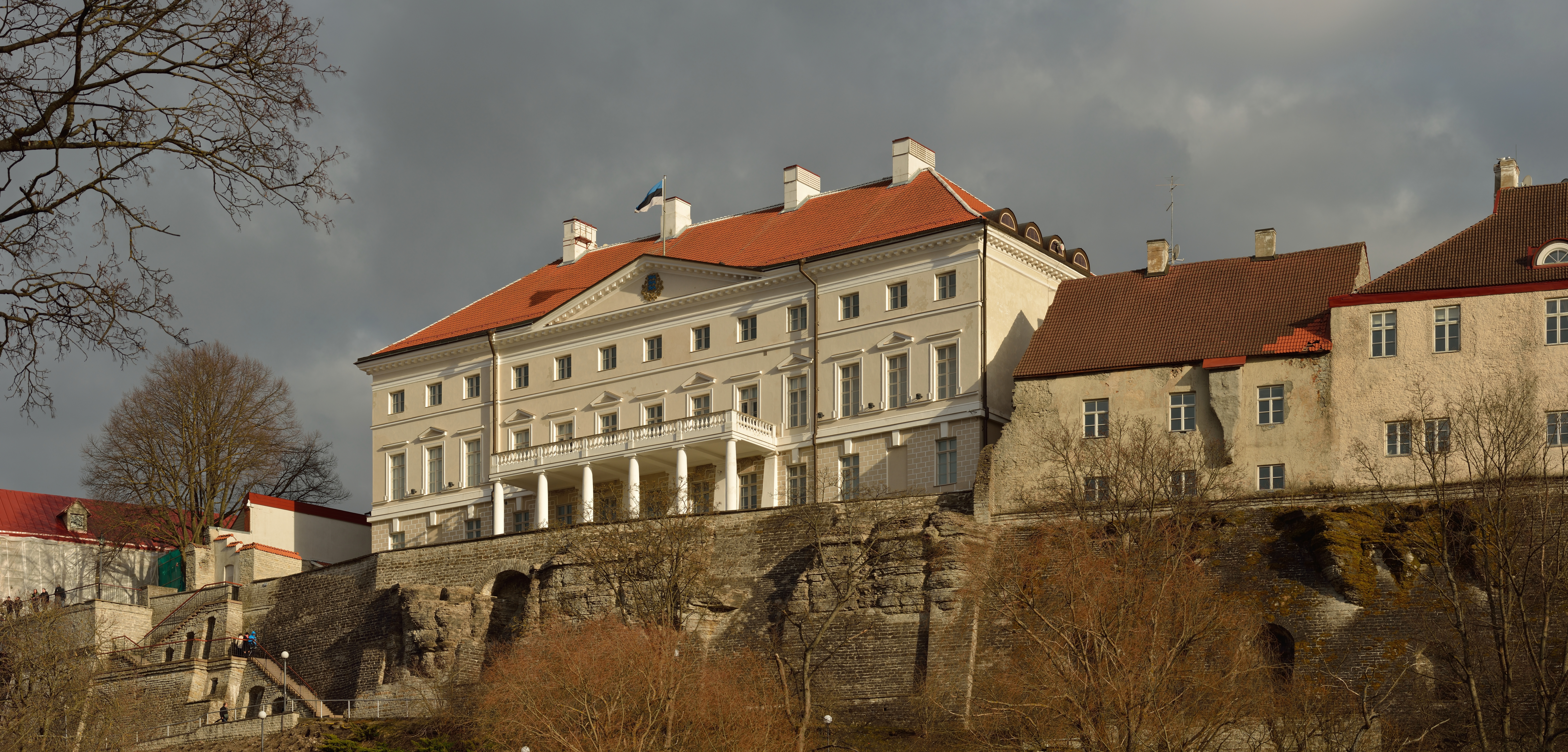
Stenbock House, seat of the Estonian Government

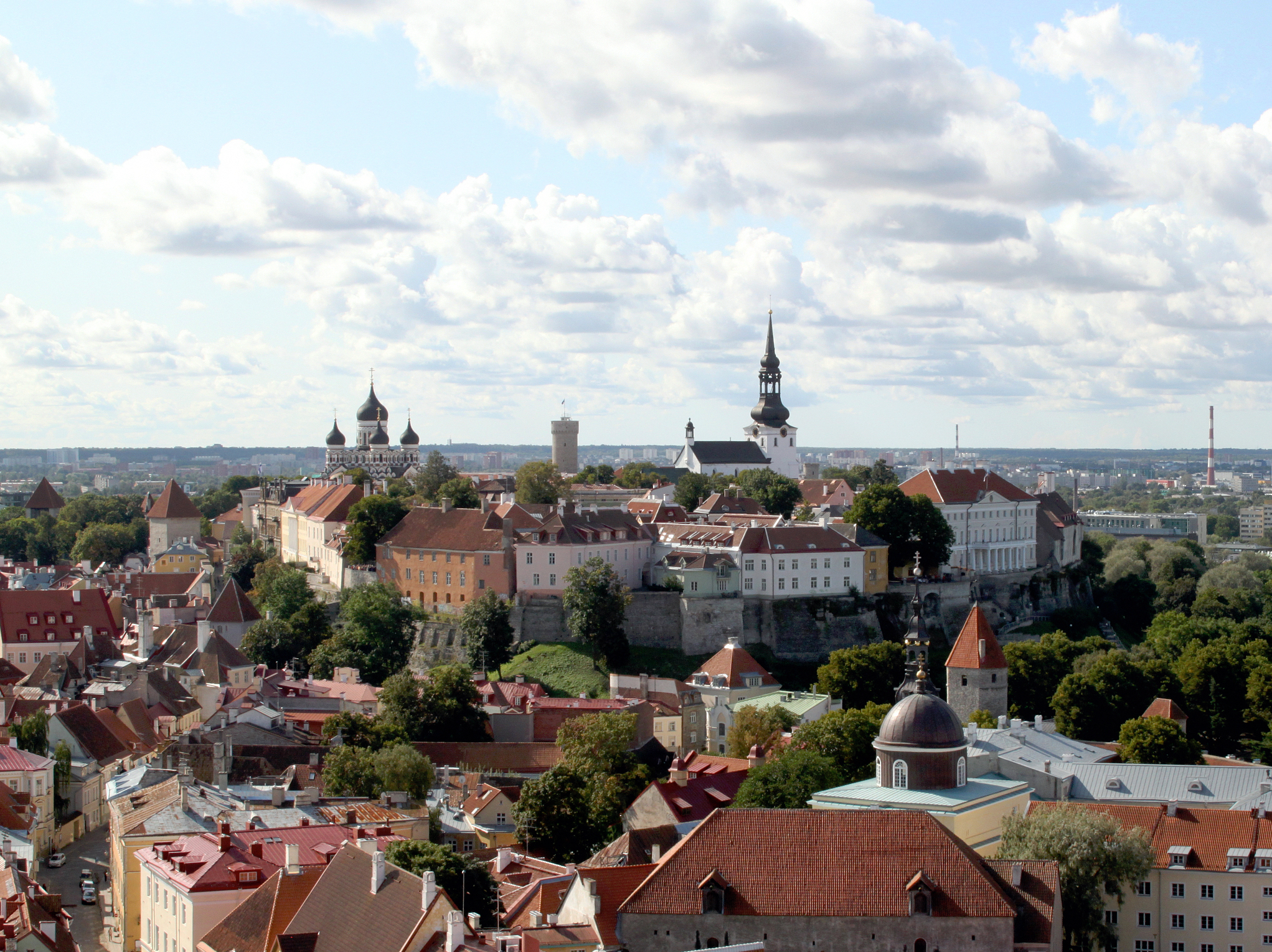
View of Toompea hill from the tower of St. Olaf's church.

The much-rebuilt Toompea Castle – consisting of the czarist era governor's palace, walls and towers of the medieval fortress, the expressionist parliament building dating from 1922, and a few other buildings – now houses the Estonian Parliament. The facade of the classicist governor's palace dominates Lossi plats ("Castle square"), where the Orthodox Alexander Nevsky Cathedral overtops it. The cathedral, now the main church of the Estonian Orthodox Church of Moscow Patriarchate, has become something of a symbol of Tallinn for tourists due to its distinctive appearance, while Estonians' opinions of it are mixed. The Lutheran Cathedral (Toomkirik), from which the name Toompea was originally derived, is now the seat of the Estonian Evangelical Lutheran Church and has perhaps best retained a medieval appearance among the buildings of Toompea. Most of the buildings in Toompea date from the 18th and 19th centuries. While the Small Castle has generally preserved its shape, only a few fragments remain of the Great Castle's walls and towers.

Other notable sites in Toompea include the building of the Government of Estonia (also known as "The Stenbock House") and the building of the Estonian Knighthood, which in 1992-2005 housed the Estonian Art Museum and since 2009 is temporarily used by the Estonian Academy of Arts. The Estonian Academy of Sciences is also seated in Toompea, in the Ungern-Sternberg palace (seat of the local German cultural self-government in the interwar period).

Toompea is also the location of several foreign embassies to Estonia, including those of Finland, the Netherlands, Portugal, and the office of the embassy of Canada.

There are several viewing platforms in Toompea offering views of the surrounding city.

== Geology and topography ==
Toompea is a limestone hill covered by an oblong tableland which measures about 400 by 250 metres, has an area of 7 hectares (17 acres), and is about 20–30 metres higher than the surrounding areas. Geologically Toompea is associated with the North Estonian Klint (itself a subsection of the Baltic Klint). A separate relic klint island, Toompea lies about 1.5 km northwest of the North Estonian Limestone Plateau. The plateau and Toompea are connected with a gently sloped sandstone ridge. From the east, north and west Toompea is bordered for 1.5 km by a cliff with a height of up to 25 m. The southern slope of the hill descends more gently. The upper layer of the hill consists of Ordovician limestone (thickness about 5 m), which is also the main rock exposed at the cliff. However, most of the cliff face has been hidden behind a protective wall and only a few outcrops are left.

== Mythology ==
In Estonian mythology Toompea is known as the tumulus mound over the grave of Kalev, erected in his memory by his grieving wife Linda, as described in the national epic Kalevipoeg:

Linda mourned for Kalev for one month after another till three months had passed, and the fourth was far advanced. She heaped a cairn of stones over his tomb, which formed the hill on which the Cathedral of Revel now stands.^{English translation by W.F. Kirby, 1895}

== See also ==
- Toompea Castle
