= Karaski =

Karaski may refer to several places in Estonia:

- Karaski, Põlva County, village in Estonia
- Karaski, Võru County, village in Estonia
