= Saarte Investeering =

Company based in Estonia

OÜ (LLC) Saarte Investeering is an Estonian investment company that specializes in real estate development and offers its clients management services and business consultations. OÜ Saarte Investeering was founded in 2001 by Tullio Liblik, CEO and the chairman of the board of OÜ Saarte Investeering. Saarte Investeering has led real estate developments in Kuressaare in Saare County, also in Tallinn and in Sauga parish in Pärnu County.

== Subcompanies ==
- A&A Kinnisvara Saaremaa

A&A Kinnisvara Saaremaa specializes in real estate development.

- 2005-2011 AS E-Profiil

E-Profiil specializes in manufacturing of large steel structures and equipment for the offshore oil and gas industry.

- 2005-2008 OÜ Paldiski Wind Farm

There are 9 wind turbines, each of which with a capacity of 2.5 MW, in the Paldiski wind farm. The total capacity of the wind farm is 22.5 MW.

== Support Projects ==
=== Supporting Successful Pupils ===
In 2007-2011 OÜ Saarte Investeering supported the pupils and their tutors of Saare County who had achieved spectacular results in Estonian and international olympiads and national exams. Year by year Saarte Investeering has added new entrepreneurs in the supporters’ circle of the successful pupils, who are proceeding with the support project up to the present time.

Since 2010 Saarte Investeering has supported the Graduate of the Year of Kuressaare Adults’ Gymnasium with a scholarship. In 2012 Saarte Investeering signed a cooperation contract with Kuressaare Regional Training Centre. According to the contract, every five years Saarte Investeering awards one graduate of Kuressaare Regional Training Centre with a scholarship, who will proceed to acquire a higher education in the same field in Estonia or abroad.

Starting from the same year, he has also been the main sponsor of the Football championship of Saare County.

=== Timehouse Gallery ===
In 2006 Saarte Investeering constructed Timehouse Gallery in the city center of Kuressaare in order contribute to the living and working environment of Kuressaare, and the value of local art life. There is a new exhibition in the Timehouse Gallery almost every month, for exampleyoung artists exhibited their creation in March 2013.

=== Football in Saare County ===
Since 2008 Tullio Liblik, the CEO and the chairman of the board of Saarte Investeering, is the president of the Saare County's FC aaMeraaS and since 2010 OÜ Saarte Investeering is the main sponsor of the football championships in Saare County.
