= Arvo Horm =

Estonian politician, economist, and journalist (1913–1996)

- Born: Arnold Horn; October 8, 1913; Vastseliina Manor, Võrumaa, Estonia
- Died: April 15, 1996 (aged 82); Ornö, Sweden
- Occupations: Politician, economist, and journalist

Arvo Horm (until 1935 Arnold Horn, October 8, 1913 – April 15, 1996) was an Estonian politician, economist, and journalist.

== Early life and education ==
Arvo Horm was born Arnold Horn at Vastseliina Manor, the son of Peeter Horn (later Horm, 1874–1946) and Amalie (Maali) Horn (née Liiv, 1879–1954). He studied economics at the University of Tartu from 1934 to 1938 and graduated cum laude. He was a member of the Põhjala Estonian Students' Society. He escaped to Sweden via Finland in 1943.

== Career ==
Horm served as the minister of economic affairs from March 1, 1963, to August 24, 1977, in the Estonian government-in-exile, after which he served as minister without portfolio. He was a member of the board of the Estonian National Foundation, and he was the editor of the newspaper Teataja from 1971 to 1996. He was elected to the Estonian Committee's Board of Deputies in 1966, 1968, and 1970.

In 1967, the newspaper Komsomolskaya Pravda accused Holm of attending a CIA training school in the Netherlands and then recruiting Soviet tourists in Sweden for anti-Soviet activity.
