= Vana-Vastseliina =

Village in Estonia

- Village
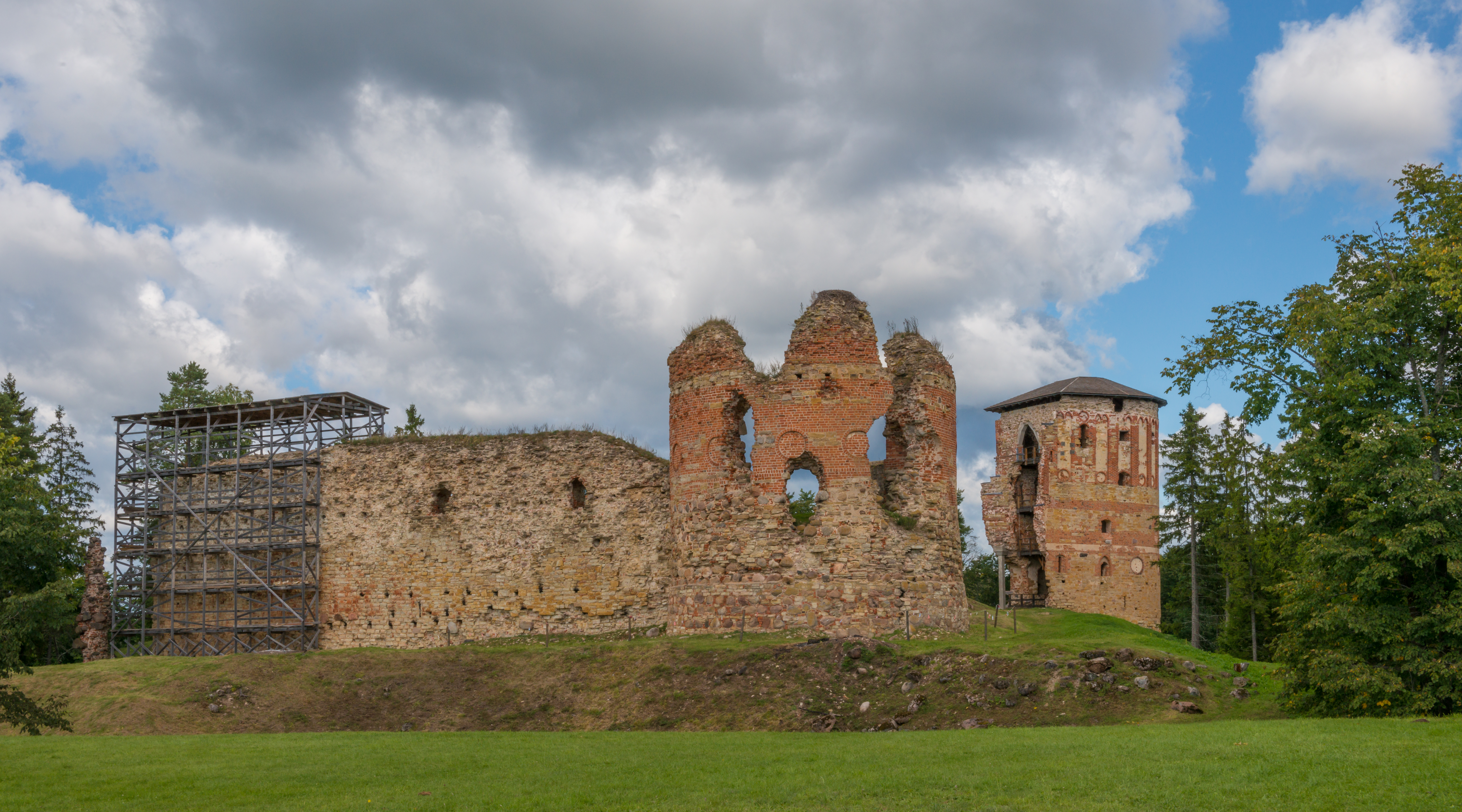
- Ruins of Vastseliina Castle

- Location within Estonia
- Coordinates: 57°43′35″N 27°21′30″E
- Country: Estonia
- County: Võru County
- Time zone: UTC+2 (EET)

Vana-Vastseliina is a village in Võru Parish, Võru County in southeastern Estonia.

Vana-Vastseliina is the location of the ruins of medieval Vastseliina Castle, built by the Livonian Order in 1342, and Vastseliina Manor.
