= Vastseliina Castle =

Castle in Estonia

Coordinates: 57°43′49″N 27°21′41″E

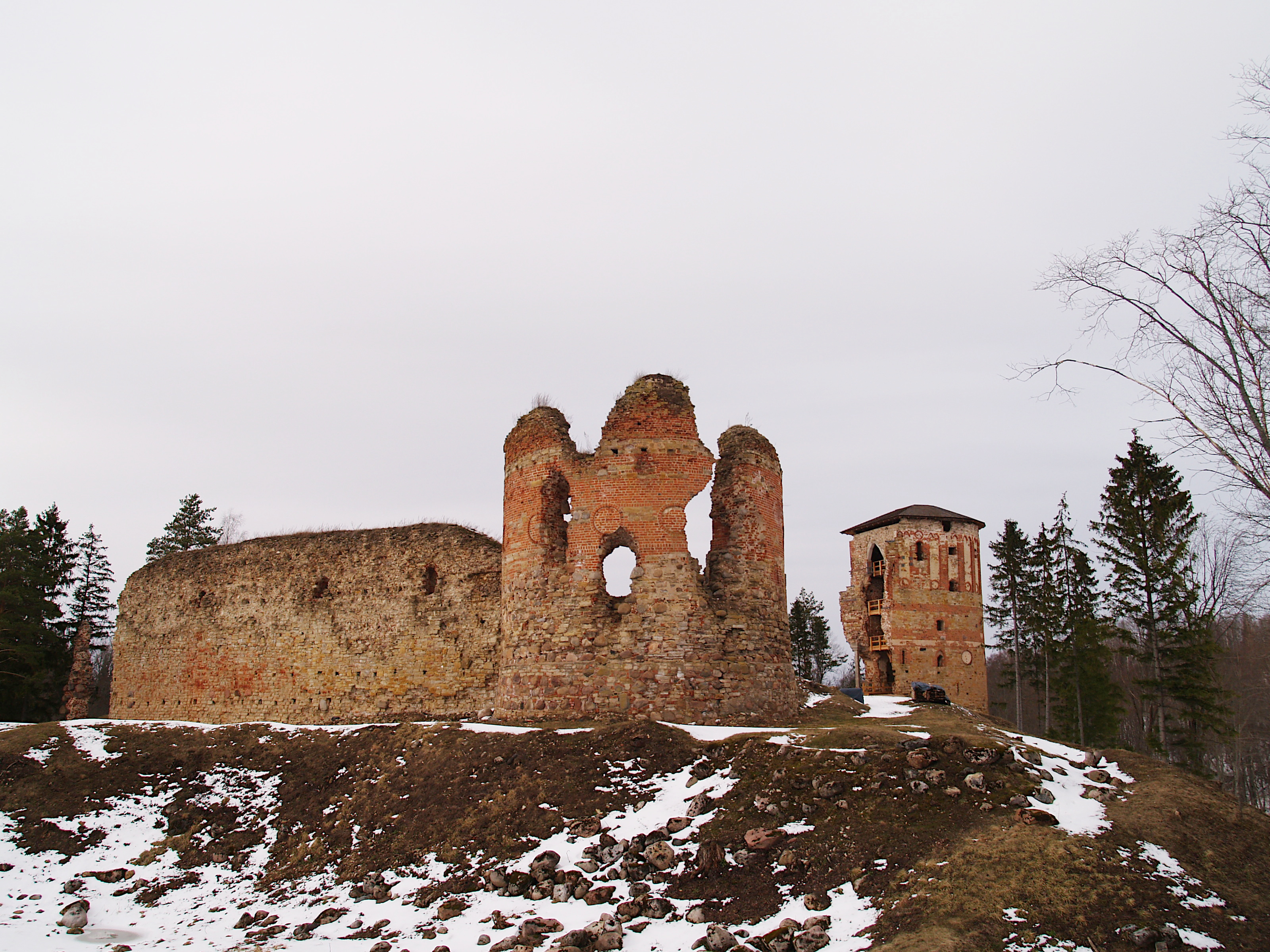
Vastseliina Castle

Vastseliina Castle (Estonian: Vastseliina piiskopilinnus; German: Neuhausen) was a castle of the Livonian Order, Bishopric of Dorpat. It was constructed by 1342 by the Landmeister Burkhard von Dreileben as part of the border fortifications of Old Livonia against Novgorod, Pskov and later Moscow.

Nowadays the ruins of the castle are located near Vastseliina (in the village of Vana-Vastseliina), Võru Parish, Võru County, Estonia.

== Gallery ==
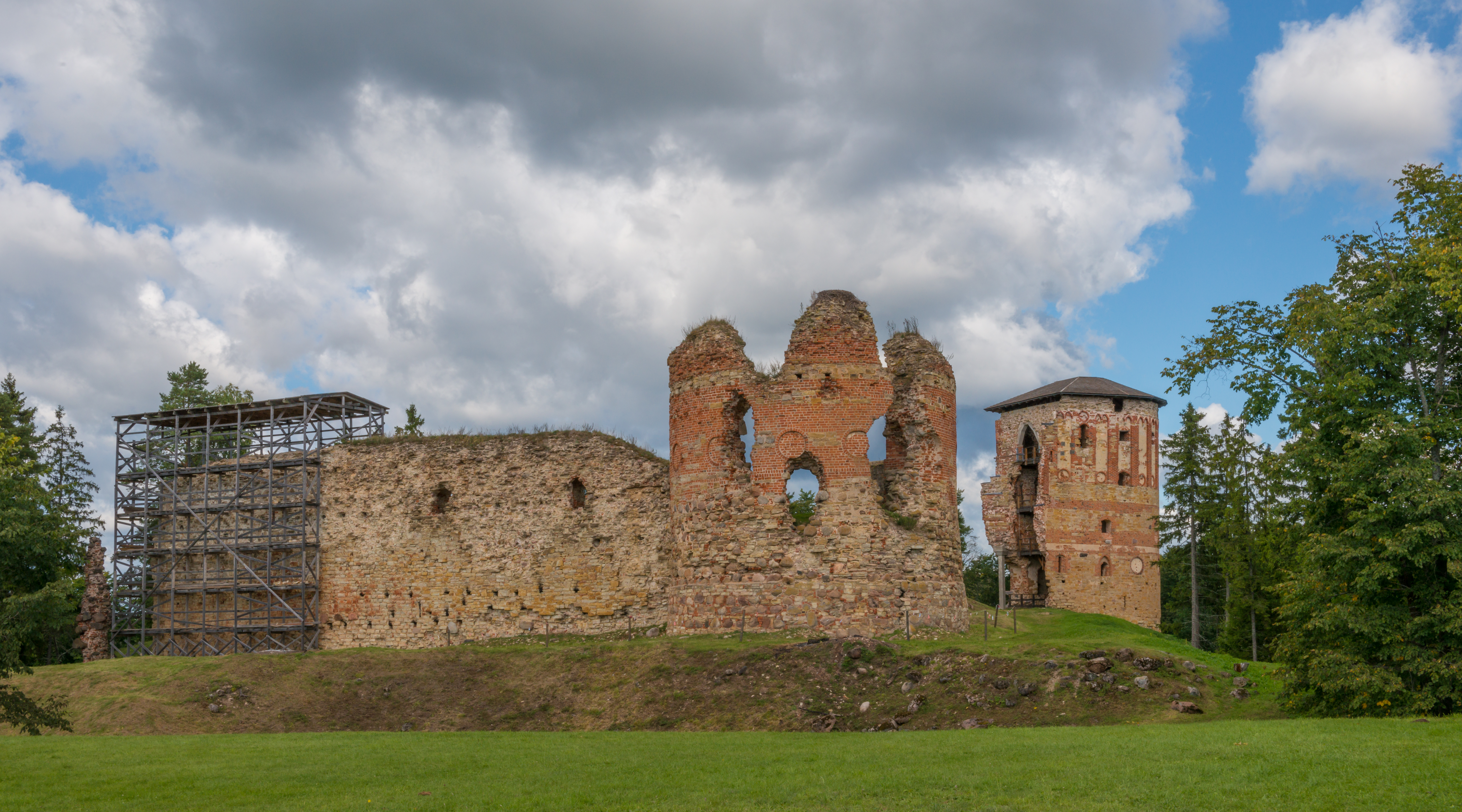
View from south

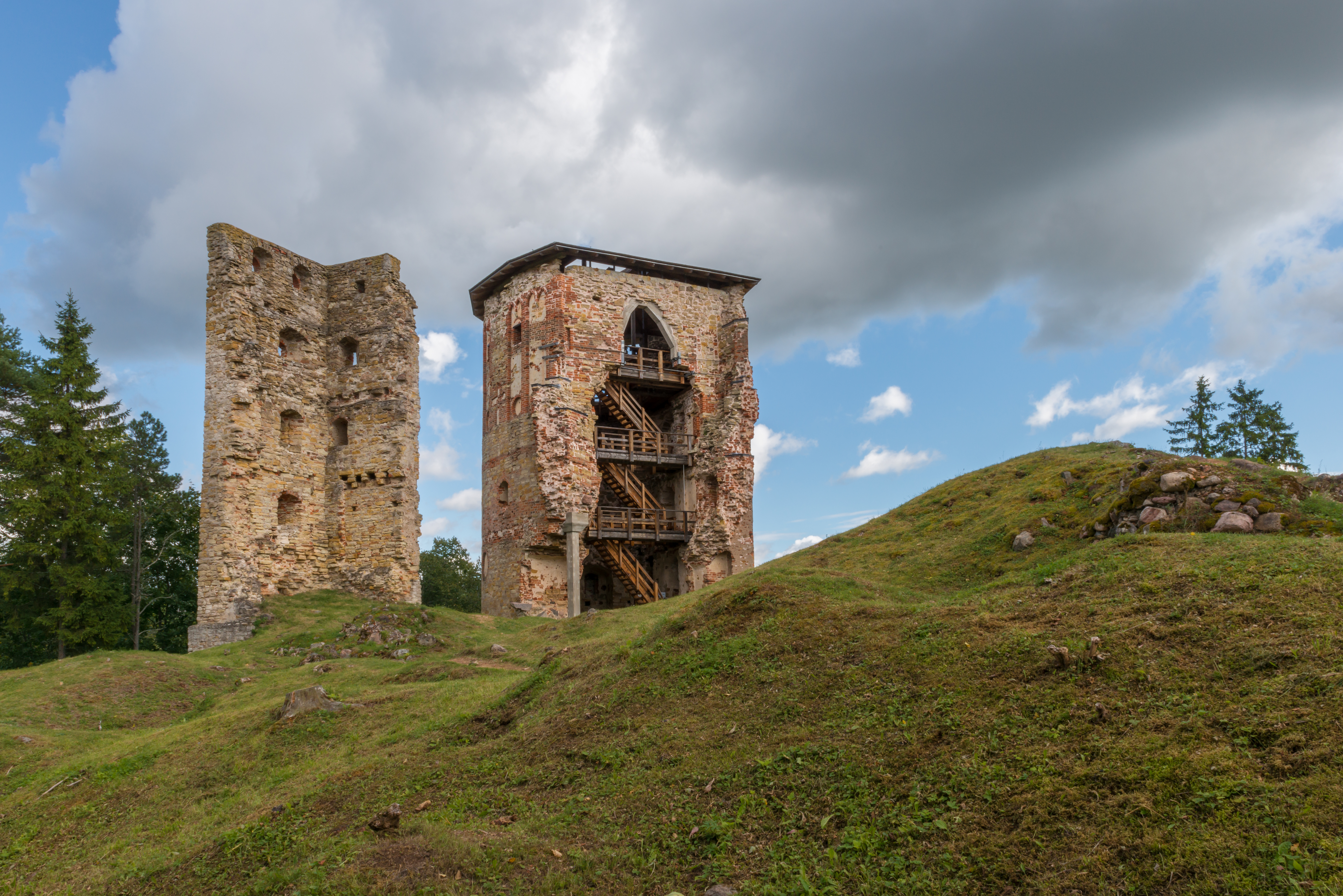
View from west

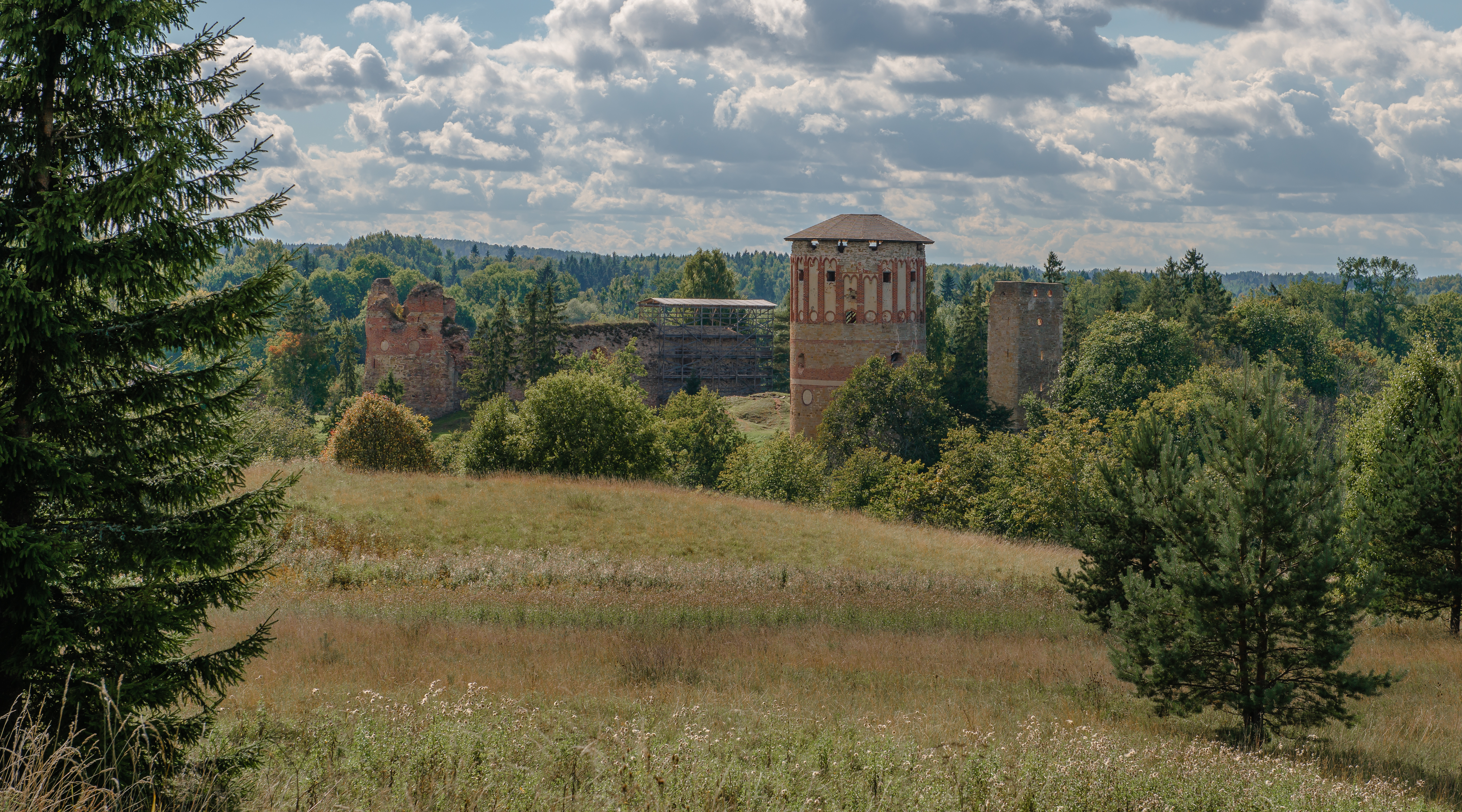
View from east

== See also ==
- History of Estonia
- List of castles in Estonia
