= Jaan Sarv =

Estonian mathematician

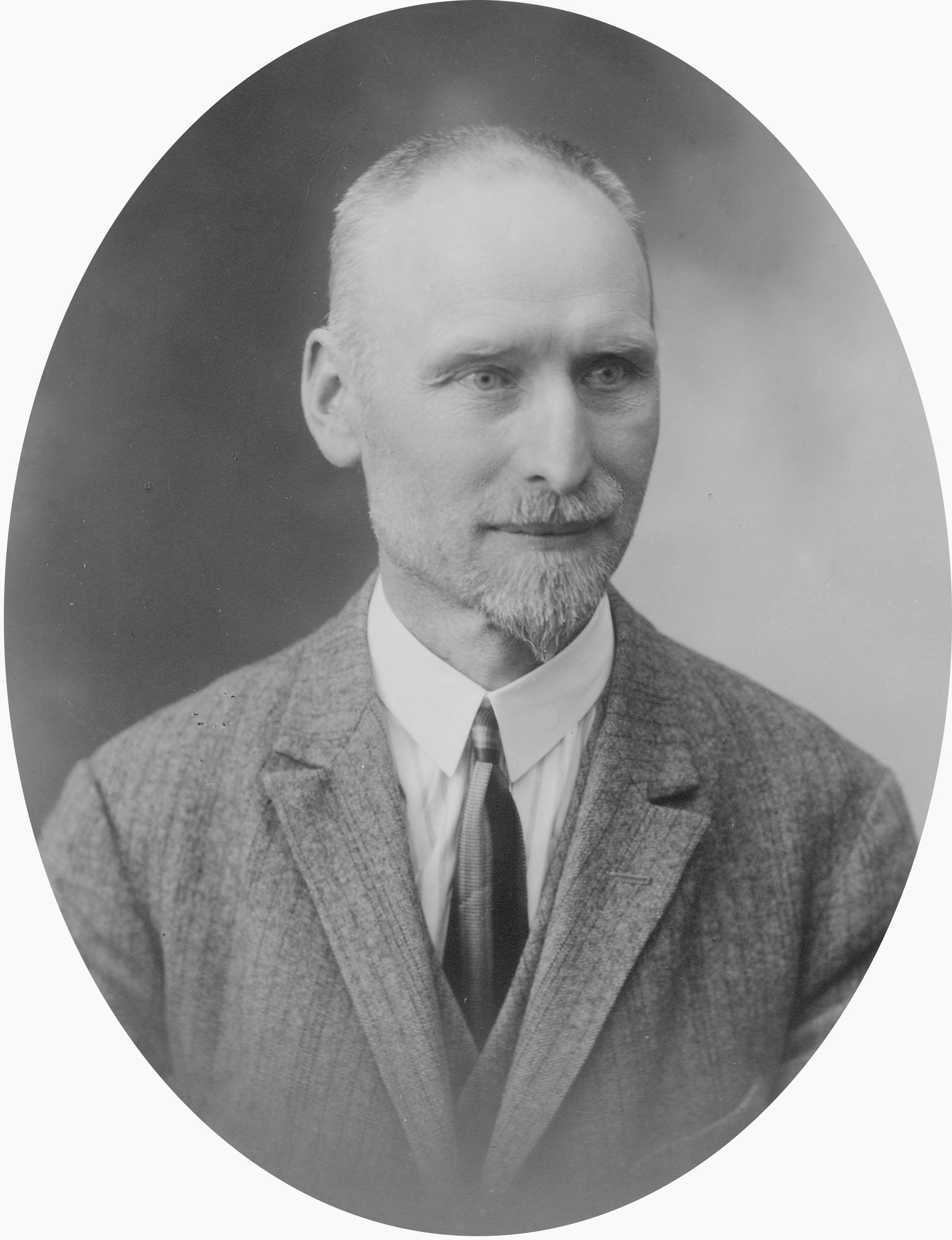
- Sarv in the 1920s
- Born: 21 December 1877; Leeguste, Gemeinde Saara, Governorate of Livonia, Russian Empire
- Died: 23 August 1954 (aged 76); Tartu, then part of Estonian SSR, Soviet Union
- Scientific career
- Fields: Mathematics
- Institutions: University of Tartu

Jaan Sarv (Võro: Sarvõ Jaan; 21 December 1877 – 23 August 1954) was an Estonian mathematician and educator. Most of his life he worked as a professor at the University of Tartu. Sarv laid the foundation of Estonian language mathematical education.
