= Teataja (Stockholm) =

Estonian newspaper

- Founded: 1944
- Ceased publication: 2002
- Language: Estonian
- City: Stockholm
- Country: Sweden

Teataja (The Herald) was an Estonian-language newspaper published in Stockholm, Sweden, from 1944 to 2002. The newspaper was established in October 1944.

Initially, the newspaper was published by the Estonian Committee–Association of Estonian Organizations in Sweden, and later by a commercial association created for this purpose. In its editorials, Teataja was presented as a voice for politics, culture, society, and youth issues. From 1945 to 1953, the newspaper was called Eesti Teataja. The newspaper was initially published once a week, later twice a week and then once a month, and in its last years twice a month.

== Editors ==
- 1944–1953: Bernhard Ingel
- 1945–1953: Oskar Mänd
- 1949–1953, 1960–1970: Adelaida Lemberg
- 1953–1954: Ilmar Talve
- 1954, 1971–1995, 2000–2002: Aksel Mark
- 1954–1956: Evald Uustalu
- 1956–2000: Harri Kiisk
- 1957–1958: Tõnis Kint
- 1958–1960: Raimond Kolk
- 1958–1970: Aleksander Warma
- 1971–1996: Arvo Horm
- 1995–2002: Aleksander Terras
- 2000–2002: Otto Paju
- 1986–2002: Ilmar Olesk (reporter, photographer, and computer typesetter)
