= Adelaida Lemberg =

Estonian journalist and translator (1904–1986)

- Born: February 4, 1904; Kuressaare, Saaremaa, Estonia
- Died: September 25, 1986 (aged 82); Stockholm, Sweden
- Occupations: Journalist and translator

Adelaida Lemberg (a.k.a. Adelaide Lemberg, February 24, 1904 – September 25, 1986) was an Estonian journalist and translator.

== Early life and education ==
Adelaida Lemberg was born in Kuressaare, Estonia. From 1923 to 1929, she studied English philology at the University of Tartu.

== Career ==
In 1944, Lemberg fled to Sweden. From 1949 to 1953 and from 1960 to 1975, she was the managing editor of the newspaper Teataja. From 1953 to 1960, she was a member of the editorial board of the Estonian-language programs of the Voice of America in Munich.

Lemberg was elected to the Estonian Committee (Estonian: Eesti Komitee) in 1966, 1968, and 1970. She died in Stockholm in 1986.
