= Tullio Liblik =

Estonian entrepreneur

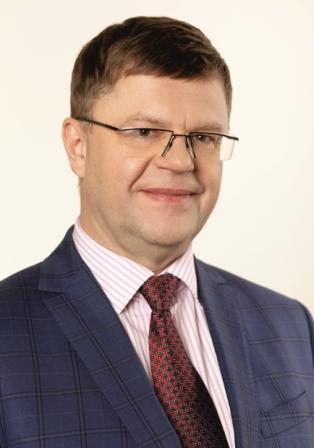
Tullio Liblik in 2013

Tullio Liblik (born November 12, 1964, in Kuressaare) is an Estonian entrepreneur, the CEO and member of the board of the investment company Saarte Investeering and the chairman of the council of Kuressaare Regional Training Centre.

== Education ==
- 1984 Jäneda Sovkhoz-technicum, agronomy
- 1988 Estonian University of Life Sciences, economics and organizing of agriculture

== Career ==
- 1988–1991 Pihtla kolkhoz, vice-chairman
- 1991–2001 Alliance of Saare Manufacturers, advisor of foreign trade
- Since 1992, Estonian Chamber of Commerce and Industry, chairman of the Saaremaa Office
- 1993–1999 AS Ösel Foods, member of the board
- 1999–2001 AS Ösel Foods, chairman of the board
- Since 2001, OÜ Saarte Investeering, member of the board
- 2001–2008 AS Kuressaare Sanatoorium, member of the board
- Since 2002, OÜ Roheline Ring, member of the board
- 2003– 2008 Saaremaa Golf, member of the board
- 2005–2011 AS E-Profiil, chairman of the board
- Since 2005, OÜ A&A Kinnisvara Saaremaa, member of the board
- 2005–2008 OÜ Paldiski Wind Farm, chairman of the board
- Since 2007, OÜ Energiamaja, member of the board
- Since 2009, OÜ Energiamaja Konsultatsioonid, member of the board

Tullio Liblik made his first step into the business world in 1993, when he founded AS Ösel Foods in cooperation with Toivo Alt and Carl-Erik Sunblad. AS Ösel Foods specialized on the manufacturing of soft drinks. For raw material supply they also founded AS Marjakasvatus which specialized in the growing of strawberries. In 1997, Ösel Foods grew its business to Russia. In a factory owned by Ösel Food in Moscow, they started to produce ketchup. In 1999, they bought Paljassaare Fish Industry, from the Norwegians, which produced fish sticks. Tullio Liblik exited the food industry in 2001 when he sold his stocks of AS Ösel Foods to Carl-Erik Sunblad.

In the same year, Tullio Liblik founded the company Saarte Investeering, that specializes in real estate development and business consultations. The biggest real estate developments of Saarte Investeering are the Merikotka housing estate in Kuressaare, Hirvepargi housing estate in Sauga, Pärnu county and four multistorey buildings in the city centre of Tallinn. Saarte Investeering has led real estate developments in Saaremaa, Kuressaare, in Tallinn and Sauga parish in Pärnu county. Saarte Investeering has contributed the most to dwelling construction. Many other enterprises founded by Tullio Liblik, such as Saaremaa’s office of the real estate bureau OÜ A&A Kinnisvara and OÜ Energiamaja Konsultatsioonid, are also operating in real estate developing. In 2013, OÜ Energiamaja, that specializes in the construction of low-energy houses, started the housing development of 407 terraced houses in Peetri village in Rae parish, Harju county.

In 2001, Tullio Liblik founded OÜ Roheline Ring and participated in the founding of Estonia’s first wind farm. In 2002, a wind farm, consisting of three wind turbines, started to operate in Virtsu with a total capacity of 1,8 MW of power. Two wind turbines out of three were owned by Roheline Ring and one by Eesti Energia. In 2005, Roheline Ring installed a wind farm of four wind turbines with a total capacity of 8 MW in Lääne County, Rõuste. Via the investment company Saarte Investeering, Tullio Liblik was also a stakeholder of Paldiski wind farm. Altogether, he has participated in the construction of five wind farms that operate up to the present time. In 2007 Tullio Liblik sold his shares of the wind farms.

In 2005, the investment company Saarte Investeering, owned by Tullio Liblik, acquired the lion’s share in E-Profiil, a company manufacturing large steel structures. In 2011, Liblik sold his shares of the company E-Profiil.

Since 2002, Tullio Liblik has been the member of the council of Kuressaare Regional Training Centre, and has also been voted for the chairman of the council. In 2007, Tullio Liblik became the member of the Estonian Association for Advancement of Vocational Education and has been active in informing the vocational education leaders about the expectations of entrepreneurs. As the chairman of the council of Kuressaare Regional Training Centre he has initiated various educational projects and has been developing the Training Centre’s international cooperation.

== Social Activity ==
- Since 1992, Saaremaa Rotary Club, member
- Since 2002, Kuressaare Regional Training Centre, chairman of the council
- 2002–2005 Kuressaare Town Hall, member, chairman of the audit commission
- Since 2007, Estonian Association for Advancement of Vocational Education, member
- Since 2008, Football Club Saaremaa FC aaMeraaS, president
- Since 2010, Association of Saare Country Entrepreneurs, member of the board
- Since 2012, Development Chamber of Saare County, member

=== Supporting Successful Pupils ===
In 2007―2011, OÜ Saarte Investeering supported pupils and their tutors in Saare county who had achieved results in Estonian and international olympiads and national exams. Saarte Investeering has added new entrepreneurs to the supporters’ circle of the pupils, who are proceeding with the support project up to the present time.

Since 2010, Saarte Investeering has supported the Graduate of the Year of Kuressaare Adults’ Gymnasium with a scholarship. Starting from the same year, he has also been the main sponsor of the Football championship of Saare County.

In 2012, Saarte Investeering signed a cooperation contract with Kuressaare Regional Training Centre. According to the contract, every five years Saarte Investeering awards one graduate of Kuressaare Regional Training Centre with a scholarship, who will proceed to acquire a higher education in the same field in Estonia or abroad.

At the acknowledgement event ’’Eestimaa õpib ja tänab’’ held in 2011, SA Innove in cooperation with Estonian Ministry of Education and Research and Estonian Education Personnel Union acknowledged the CEO of Saarte Investeering, Tullio Liblik as the ’best friend and supporter of education’ in Saare County region.

== Land swap case ==
In 2005, motivated by an article that was published in Eesti Ekspress, an investigation of the entitlement and possible corruption factors concerning the swap of rural land properties under nature conservation protection was started. In 2009 the Office of the Prosecutor General brought charges to the partakers of the land swap case. Tullio Liblik was accused of bribery. Besides Liblik, two members of Riigikogu, Villu Reiljan and Ester Tuiksoo, businessmen Toomas Annus, Einar Vettus and Tarmo Pedjasaar, also Kalev Kangur, the former Director General of Estonian Land Board, and corporate bodies AS Järvevana and AS E.L.L. Kinnisvara were accused.

In 2012, Harju County Court acquitted all the defendants of the land swap case and ordered the state to pay the defendants' court costs.

== Business argument with Sukles ==
Saarte Investeering and MaxKinnisvara started their cooperation in 2004 in order to construct the Hirvepargi housing development in Sauga parish, Pärnu County. By the year 2007, twelve houses had been erected when the project needed additional financing to proceed with the construction. The owners of MaxKinnisvara didn’t want to add any more money to the initial investment of 20,000 euros and, as a consequence, disagreements arose between the partners.

Ongoing disagreements resulted in ordering a hit in 2010.

The police managed to prevent the hit and Andrus Sukles was arrested.

Harju County Court found that Sukles wished to kill his former business partner and also made preparations to achieve that. However, Sukles was acquitted.

== Personal ==
Tullio Liblik is the first child of her mother.
