= Kaitsemõisa =

Village in Estonia

- Village
- Location within Estonia
- Coordinates: 58.573888888889°N 26.817777777778°E
- Country: Estonia
- County: Tartu County
- Parish: Tartu Parish
- Time zone: UTC+2 (EET)
  - Summer (DST): UTC+3 (EEST)

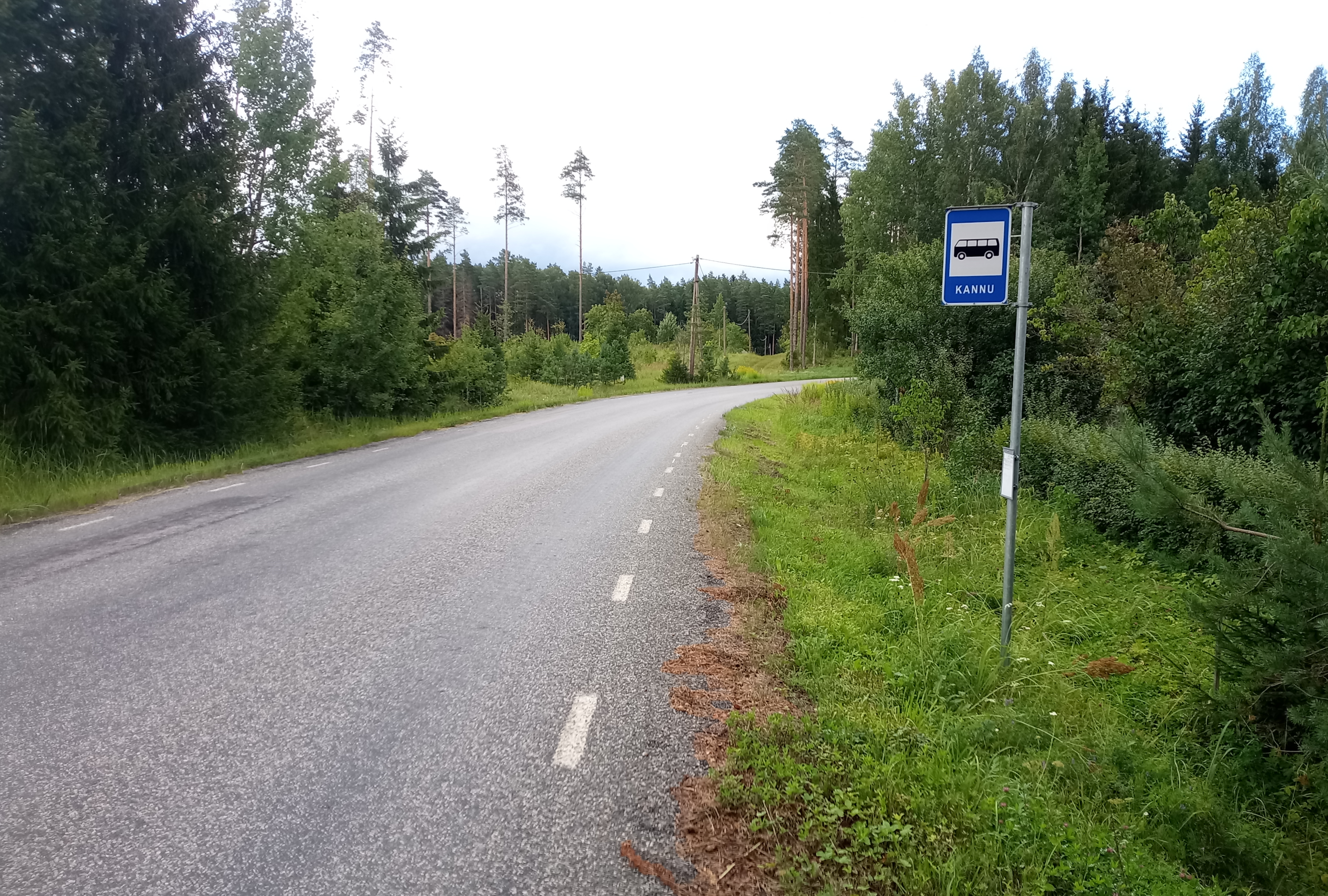
Kannu bus stop on the road from Pataste to Välgi in the village of Kaitsemõisa

Kaitsemõisa is a village in Tartu Parish, Tartu County, in Estonia.

== Notable people ==
Notable people that were born or lived in Kaitsemõisa include the following:

- Bernhard Ingel (1901–1983), journalist
