= Raimond Kolk =

Estonian writer and critic (1924–1992)

Raimond Kolk (8 February 1924 in Saru Parish, Võru County – 3 November 1992 in Stockholm) was an Estonian writer and critic.

From 1942 to 1943, Kolk studied at the Teachers' Seminary of the University of Tartu. In 1944, he fled to Finland because of German mobilization. In 1944, he moved to Sweden. From 1958 to 1963, Kolk studied at Stockholm University, taking courses in political science, national economy and statistics. In 1963, he graduated from the university as a candidate in philosophy. From 1972 to 1989, he worked as the economic director of the Swedish Food Administration in Uppsala.

While in exile, Kolk collaborated with several Estonian publications in exile; examples include the political journal Radikaaldemokraat, cultural journal Sõna, journal Tulimuld, and newspaper Teataja.

Kolk died in 1992. He is buried in Lidingö Cemetery.

== Selected works ==
- 1946: poetry collection "Ütsik täht" ('Lone Star')
- 1957: poetry collection "Müüdud sõrmus" ('Sold Ring')
- 1958: novel "Sulajää" ('Melting Ice')
- 1977: poetry collection "Kiri" ('Letter')
