= Aksel Mark =

Estonian politician (1913–2014)

Aksel Mark (20 June 1913 – 17 June 2014) was an Estonian politician, chairman of the Estonian Democratic Union, journalist, newspaper editor and agronomist. Mark was the Estonian Minister of the Interior in exile between 1962 and 1992.

Mark was born in Karaski, and had three brothers: Adolf (1905–1947; died in a Siberian prison camp), Albert (1907–1945; killed as a Forest Brother) and politician Heinrich Mark (1911–2004). He graduated from Võru Common Gymnasium in 1931 and from the Faculty of Agriculture of the University of Tartu in 1937. Following the Occupation of Estonia, he fled to Sweden.

In Sweden, Mark worked in the field testing department of the Royal Swedish Academy of Agriculture and Forestry in Stockholm and from 1950 until his retirement in Uppsala. He also continued his career as a journalist as an editor and editor-in-chief of the expatriate Estonian-language newspaper Teataja.

Aksel Mark was the chairman of the Eesti Välisvõitluse Fond and participated in the management of many Estonian expatriate organizations. He died in Uppsala, aged 100.
