= Bernhard Ingel =

Estonian journalist (1901–1983)

- Born: February 23, 1901; Kaitsemõisa, Tartu Parish, Estonia
- Died: April 7, 1983 (aged 82); Stockholm, Sweden
- Occupation: Journalist

Bernhard Eduard Ingel (February 23, 1901 – April 7, 1983) was an Estonian journalist.

== Early life and education ==
Ingel was born in Kaitsemõisa, Estonia, the son of Karl Ingel (1869–1934) and Anna Sophie Ingel (née Laane, 1869–?). He studied at the Faculty of Law of the University of Tartu from 1923 to 1934, and he was an alumnus of the Estonian Students' Society.

== Career ==
Ingel participated in the Estonian War of Independence, worked in the editorial office of Postimees, and later was the editor of Wõru Teataja. In 1935, he started working as an assistant to the attorney Jaan Tõnisson in Tallinn. He was a member of the National Center Party.

In 1944, he fled to Sweden, where he was the first editor of the newspaper Teataja until 1953, and later a goldsmith.
