= Vastseliina Manor =

Former manor in Estonia

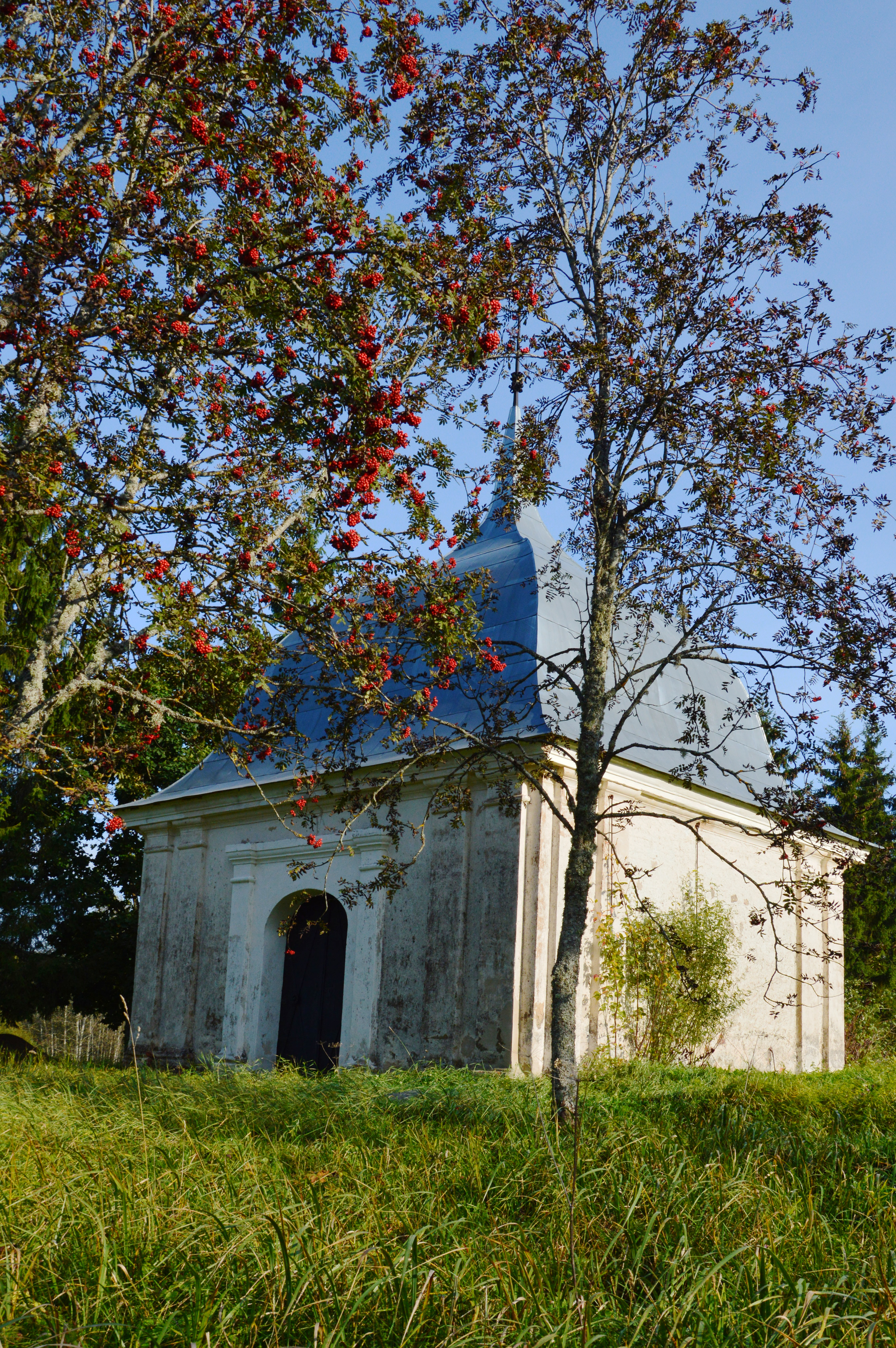
- The surviving manor chapel
- Interactive map of the Vastseliina Manor area

General information
- Location: Vana-Vastseliina, Estonia
- Coordinates: 57°43′38″N 27°21′29″E
- Client: Liphart family

Vastseliina Manor (Estonian: Vastseliina mõis, German: Schloß Neuhausen) was a knight's manor in Vana-Vastseliina, Võru County, Estonia.

== History ==
In the Middle Ages, the owner of the manor was the Bishop of Tartu. After the Livonian War, the manor was a folvark or state manor of the Vastseliina starostwo in the Dorpat Voivodeship of the Polish–Lithuanian Commonwealth. In 1776, the cavalry guard captain Karl Gotthard von Liphart (1719–1792) established a fideicommissum of the Liphart family in his will for Vastseliina, Orava Manor, and other appertaining manors, as well as for Raadi Manor and its appertaining manors, including the Raadi majorat manor. The last owner of the manor before the transfer of the manors in 1919 was Reinhold Karl von Liphart. Most of the manor's buildings were destroyed in a fire on April 25, 1925.

== Notable people ==
Notable people that were born or lived at the manor include the following:

- Arvo Horm (1913–1996), Estonian politician, economist, and journalist
