= Saru, Estonia =

Village in Estonia

Saru
- Village
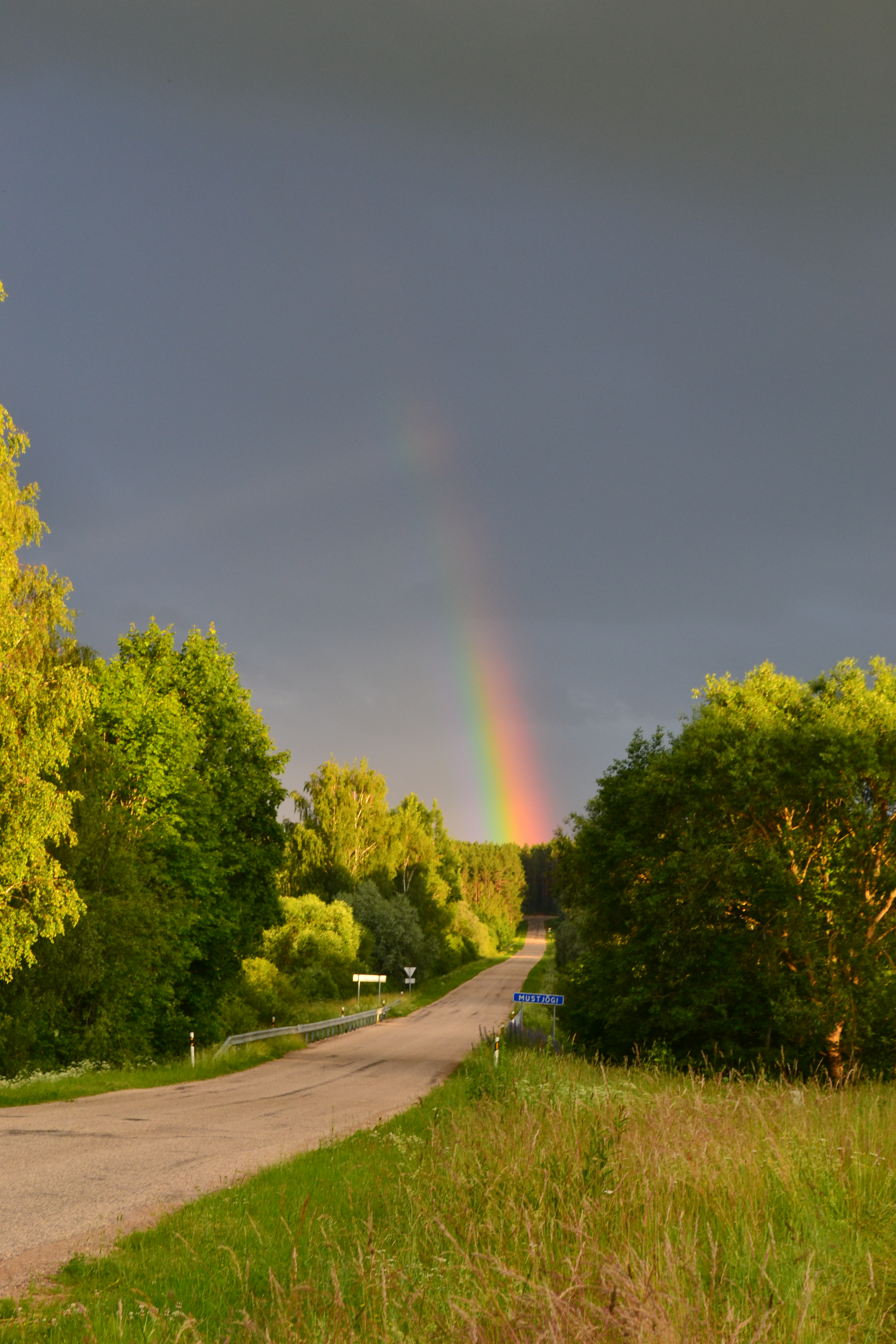
- Road over the Mustjõgi river in Saru

- Location within Estonia Location within Europe
- Coordinates: 57°35′16″N 26°38′29″E
- Country: Estonia
- County: Võru County
- Municipality: Rõuge Parish

Population (2019)
  - Total: 243
- Time zone: UTC+2 (EET)

Saru (German: Saara) is a village in Rõuge Parish, Võru County in southeastern Estonia. Between 1991–2017 (until the administrative reform of Estonian municipalities) the village was located in Mõniste Parish.

== Notable people ==
- Raimond Kolk (1924–1992), poet and writer
- Jaan Sarv (1877–1954), mathematician, was born in Leeguste village which is now part of Saru village.
