= Kuressaare =

City in Estonia

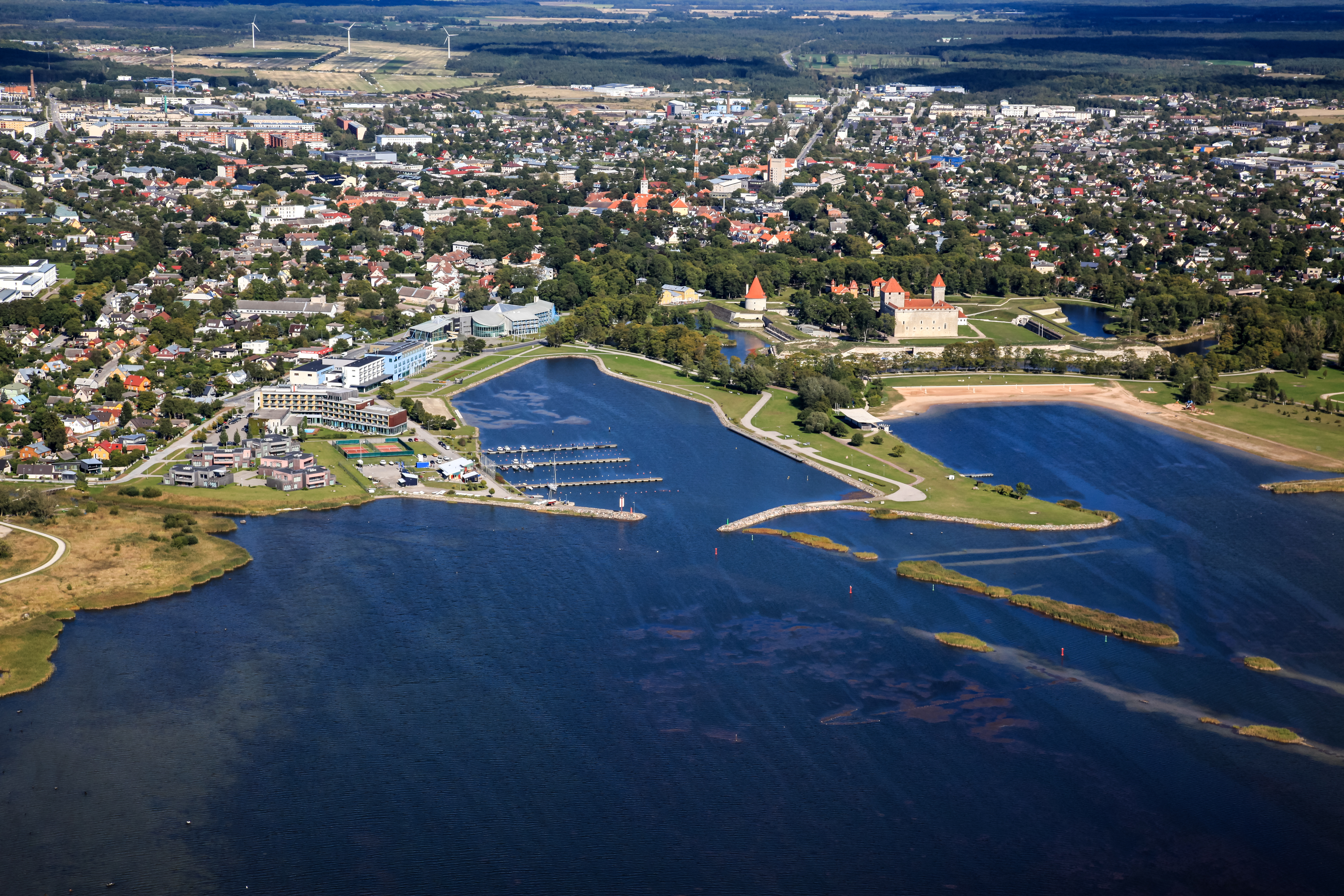
- Aerial view of Kuressaare

- Location within Estonia Location within Baltic Sea region Location within Europe
- Coordinates: 58°15′N 22°29′E
- Country: Estonia
- County: Saare
- Municipality: Saaremaa
- first written mention: 1381

Area
  - Total: 14.95 km^{2} (5.77 sq mi)
- Elevation: 5 m (16 ft)

Population (2026)
  - Total: 12,729
  - Rank: 9th
  - Density: 851.4/km^{2} (2,205/sq mi)

Ethnicity
  - Estonians: 97.6%
  - Russians: 1.2%
  - Finns: 0.3%
  - other: 0.9%
- Time zone: UTC+2 (EET)
  - Summer (DST): UTC+3 (EEST)
- Postal code: 93813

Kuressaare (Estonian pronunciation: [ˈkureˈsˑɑːre]) is the only city on the island of Saaremaa in Estonia. It is the administrative centre of Saaremaa Municipality and the seat of Saare County. Kuressaare is the westernmost town in Estonia. The recorded population on 1 January 2024 was 13,185.

The city is situated on the southern coast of Saaremaa, facing the Gulf of Riga of the Baltic Sea, and is served by the Kuressaare Airport, Roomassaare harbour, and Kuressaare yacht harbour.

== Names ==
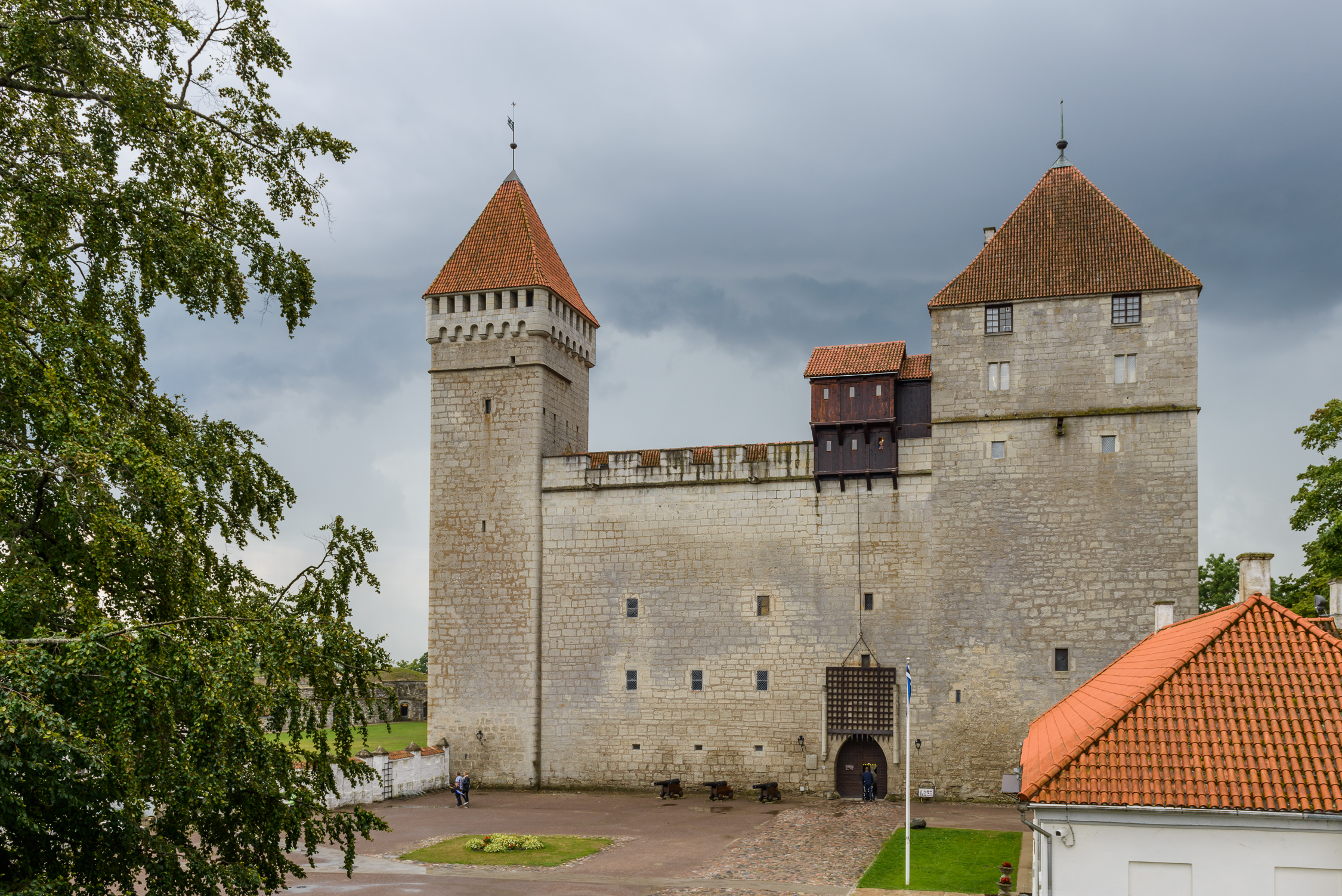
Kuressaare Castle

Kuressaare's historic name Arensburg (from Middle High German a(a)r: eagle, raptor) renders the Latin denotation arx aquilae for the city's castle. The fortress and the eagle, tetramorph symbol of Saint John the Evangelist, are also depicted on Kuressaare's coat of arms.

The town, which grew around the fortress, was simultaneously known by variants of its German-language name Arensburg (or Ahrensburg) and the Estonian name Kuresaare linn; the latter name being a combination of Kure saar — an ancient name of the Saaremaa island — and linn ('city', 'fortress'). Alternatively, the name may come from kure ('crane', 'large bird') a name that may have come from the city's German name and coat of arms, or may have existed before German settlers arrived. Eventually, the town's name shortened to Kuressaare and became the official name when Estonia became an independent country in 1918. During the Soviet occupation of Estonia, the city was officially called Kingissepa in 1952—1988 after Viktor Kingissepp, a Kuressaare-native Bolshevik who was executed by KaPo on the 3rd of May, 1922

== History ==
Historical affiliations

- Pre-Christian Saaremaa until 1227
- Bishopric of Riga 1227–1228
- Bishopric of Ösel-Wiek 1228–1572
  - rebellion 1343–1345
  - Danish-controlled Bishopric of Ösel-Wiek1560–1572
- Denmark 1572–1645
- Sweden 1645–1704
- Russia
  - tsardom 1710–1721
  - empire 1721–1917
  - republic 1917
- (Germany) German occupation 1917–1918
- Estonia since 1918
  - (Soviet Union) Soviet occupation 1940–1941, 1944–1991
  - (Germany) German occupation 1941–1944

The entire island of Saaremaa (Ösel or Oesel in historical context) was conquered by the German crusading order of Sword Brethren in 1227. The western and southern portions of Saaremaa then became part of the Bishopric of Ösel-Wiek in 1228, a vassal statelet of the Holy Roman Empire. The first documentation of the Prince-bishop's castle in Kuressaare (arx aquilae) has been found in Latin texts written in 1381 and 1422. Over time, a town, which became known as Arensburg or Kuressaare linn, grew and flourished around the fortress.

Johann von Münchhausen, Bishop of Ösel-Wiek since 1542, converted from Catholicism to Protestantism and sold his lands to King of Denmark in 1559, and returned to his native Germany soon after. King of Denmark sent his younger brother Prince Magnus to Kuressaare where he was elected bishop the following year. It was through his influence that the city obtained its German civic charter in 1563. The bishopric was finally secularised in 1572 and Kuressaare as well as the entire island of Saaremaa became part of the Kingdom of Denmark.

In 1645, Saaremaa passed from Denmark to the Kingdom of Sweden through the Treaty of Brömsebro. Queen of Sweden granted her favourite, Magnus Gabriel de la Gardie, the title of Count of Arensburg. During the Great Northern War, the city suffered heavily from the plague, and eventually burnt to the ground by the invading troops of the Tsardom of Russia in 1710. Saaremaa was incorporated into the Governorate of Livonia of the Russian Empire through the Treaty of Nystad in 1721.

During the 19th century Kuressaare became a popular seaside resort on the Baltic Sea coast. The first known tourist group visited Kuressaare already in 1840, and, since then, it has remained a popular summer destination and resort town to this day.

In the middle of the 19th century, Kuressaare became a spa town when large reserves of healing mud were discovered near the town. The first mud spa was built in 1840. Healing with mud baths has been tested on the west coast of Saaremaa since the mid-1820s. It was the "healthy mud" that became Kuressaare's main attraction. New sanatoriums and boarding houses were created, the order was considerably improved and the number of visitors continued to grow.

During World War I, in the autumn of 1917, German land and naval forces invaded Saaremaa during Operation Albion and occupied the island until the end of the war in November 1918. Kuressaare was the administrative capital of the Saaremaa County of independent Estonia from 1918 to 1940. During that time, the resort's heyday continued. In addition to domestic visitors, there were also visitors from foreign countries: Latvia, Finland and Sweden.

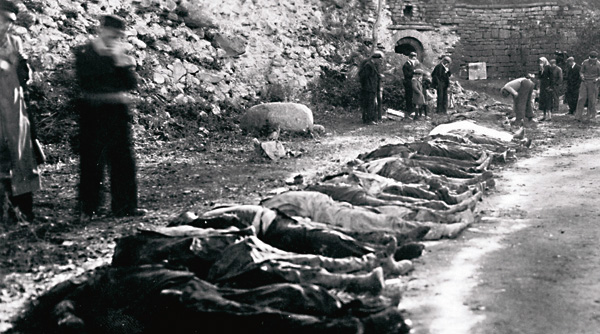
Over 90 civilians were killed by the Soviet naval forces and NKVD in 1941 in Kuressaare in one of the largest mass executions during the Soviet occupation of Estonia.

During World War II, after the Soviet Union had invaded and annexed Estonia in the summer of 1940, hundreds of Saaremaa islanders were arrested, deported, and executed by the Soviet regime. Over 90 civilians were killed by the Soviet naval forces and NKVD in 1941 in Kuressaare Castle.

The development of tourism stopped during World War II and was very slow during the second Soviet occupation of Estonia in 1944-1991, when the entirety of Saaremaa was declared a closed border zone, which excluded all foreign tourism. Only strictly limited and controlled domestic tourism was allowed.

Today, Kuressaare is once again a resort town. New health facilities and hotels have been built, and historical monuments have been restored. Two thirds of the current visitors to the city are mainland Estonians, the remaining visitors are mainly from Finland, Sweden and Latvia.

=== Sights ===
The old town of Kuressaare mainly preserves historical buildings from the 18th and 19th centuries, but there are also older ones. In the old town there are, for example, St. Nicholas Church and Laurentius Church, a goods yard, an old mill (1899), a harbor yard (1663) and residential buildings. The baroque town hall and council house date from the 17th century, while the building of the Saaremaa Knighthood, located next to the Kuressaare town hall, dates from the 18th century. Among the oldest preserved buildings are also the parsonage building at Kauba tänav 5 and the Põlluvahi house at the corner of Kitsa and Kitzbergi streets. The wooden church building from 1912, which belongs to the Estonian Methodist Church, is also noteworthy.

==== Kuressaare Castle ====
The medieval episcopal Kuressaare Castle today houses the Saaremaa Regional Museum. The original wooden castle was constructed between 1338 and 1380, although other sources claim a fortress was built in Kuressaare as early as 1260. In 1968, architect Kalvi Aluve began studies on Kuressaare Castle. The square-shaped fortress consists of four building wings around the courtyard. On the northeast side are the gate and two towers: Pikk Hermann and Sturvolt. 17-18 are also important. The powerful earthen fortifications of the Kuressaare fortress around the medieval fortress core date from the 19th century. Kuressaare Castle is one of the best preserved in the Baltic States. It has been restored several times since the beginning of the 20th century. Since 2001, Kuressaare Castle Days has been organized every summer with knight tournaments, theatrical tours and processions, and other medieval attractions.

Southwest of the castle is Tori Bay, where the port of Kuressaare is located.

Kuressaare Castle Park and the historicist-style Kuressaare Kursaal are the center of resort life. Both were founded in the second half of the 19th century.

At the beginning of Lossi Street, in the former fish market, there is a monument to those who fell in the Estonian War of Independence.

== Neighborhoods of Kuressaare ==
There are nine neighborhoods of Kuressaare:

- Ida-Niidu
- Kesklinn
- Kellamäe
- Marientali
- Põllu alev
- Roomassaare
- Smuuli
- Suuremõisa
- Tori.

== Landmarks and culture ==
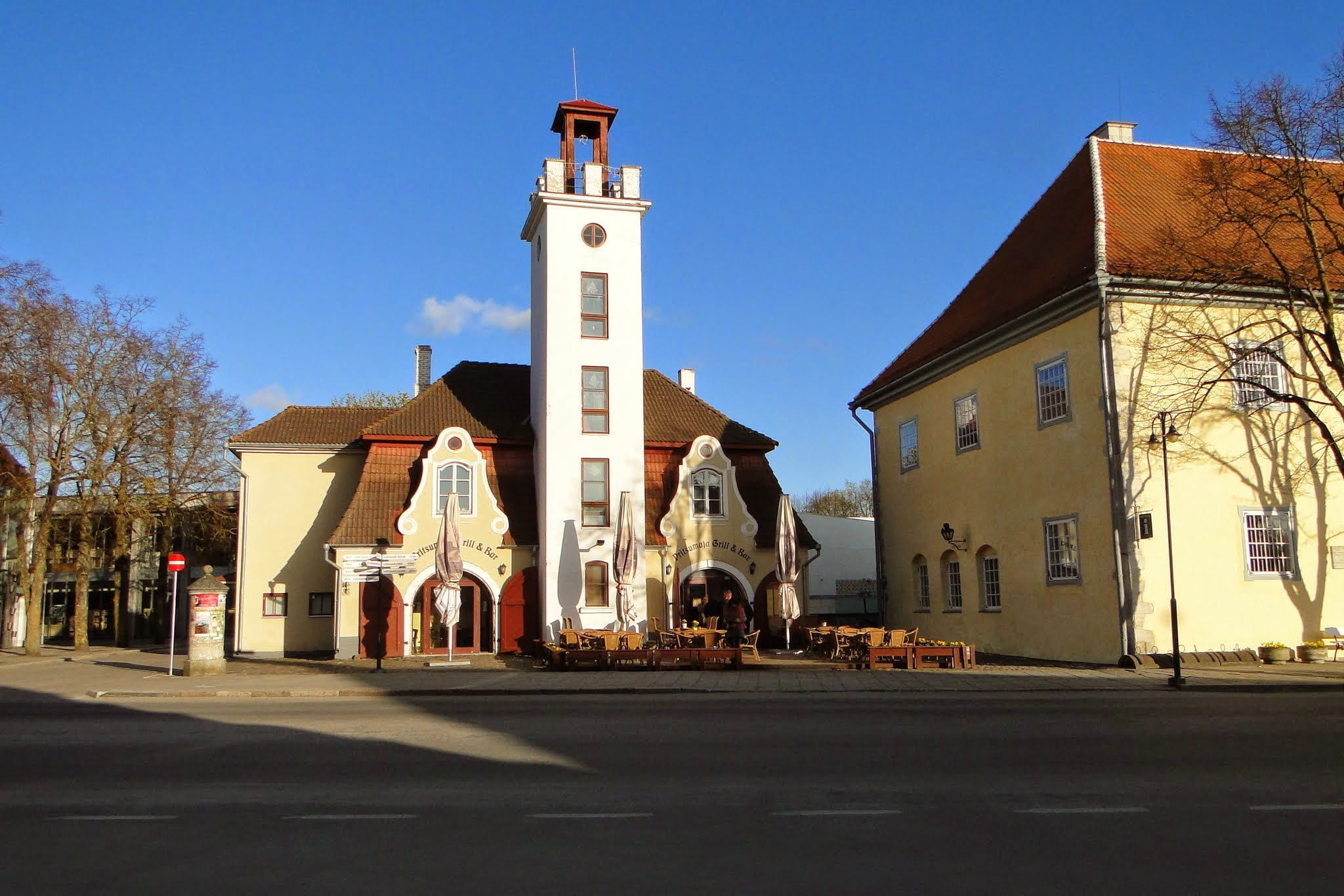
Historical buildings in city center

The city's biggest attraction is the Kuressaare Castle, which mainly dates from the 14th century, and currently houses the Saaremaa Museum.

The town hall was originally built in 1654, and restored, retaining classicist and baroque features. It was last restored in the 1960s with dolomite stairs at the front. St Nicolaus Church was built in 1790.

The annual Saaremaa Opera Days (Saaremaa Ooperipäevad) has been held in Kuressaare each summer since 1999. Other festivals include Kuressaare Chamber Music Days (Kuressaare Kammermuusika Päevad), held since 1995, and Kuressaare Maritime Festival (Kuressaare Merepäevad), held since 1998.

Kuressaare also hosts the FC Kuressaare football club.

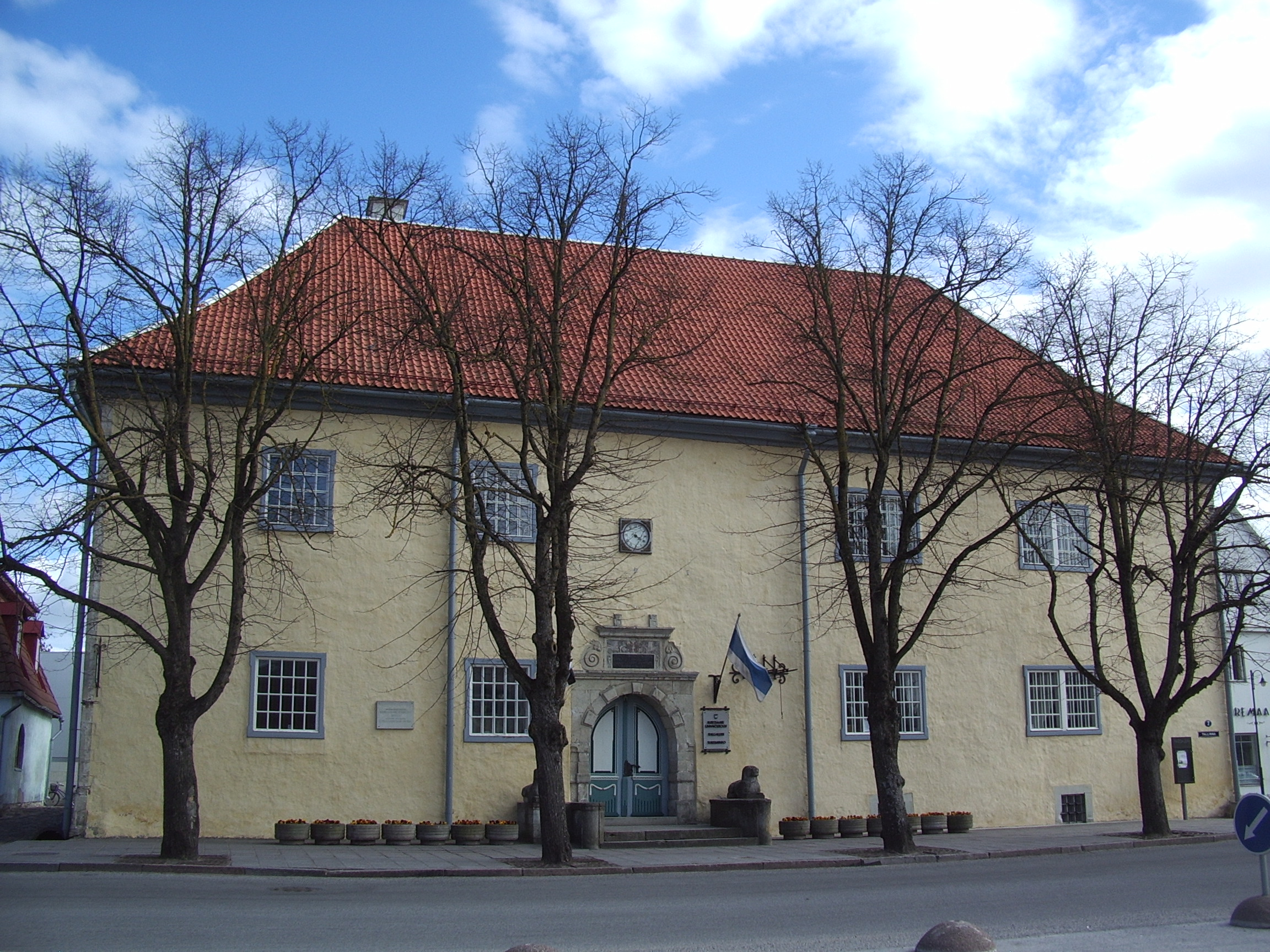
Town hall

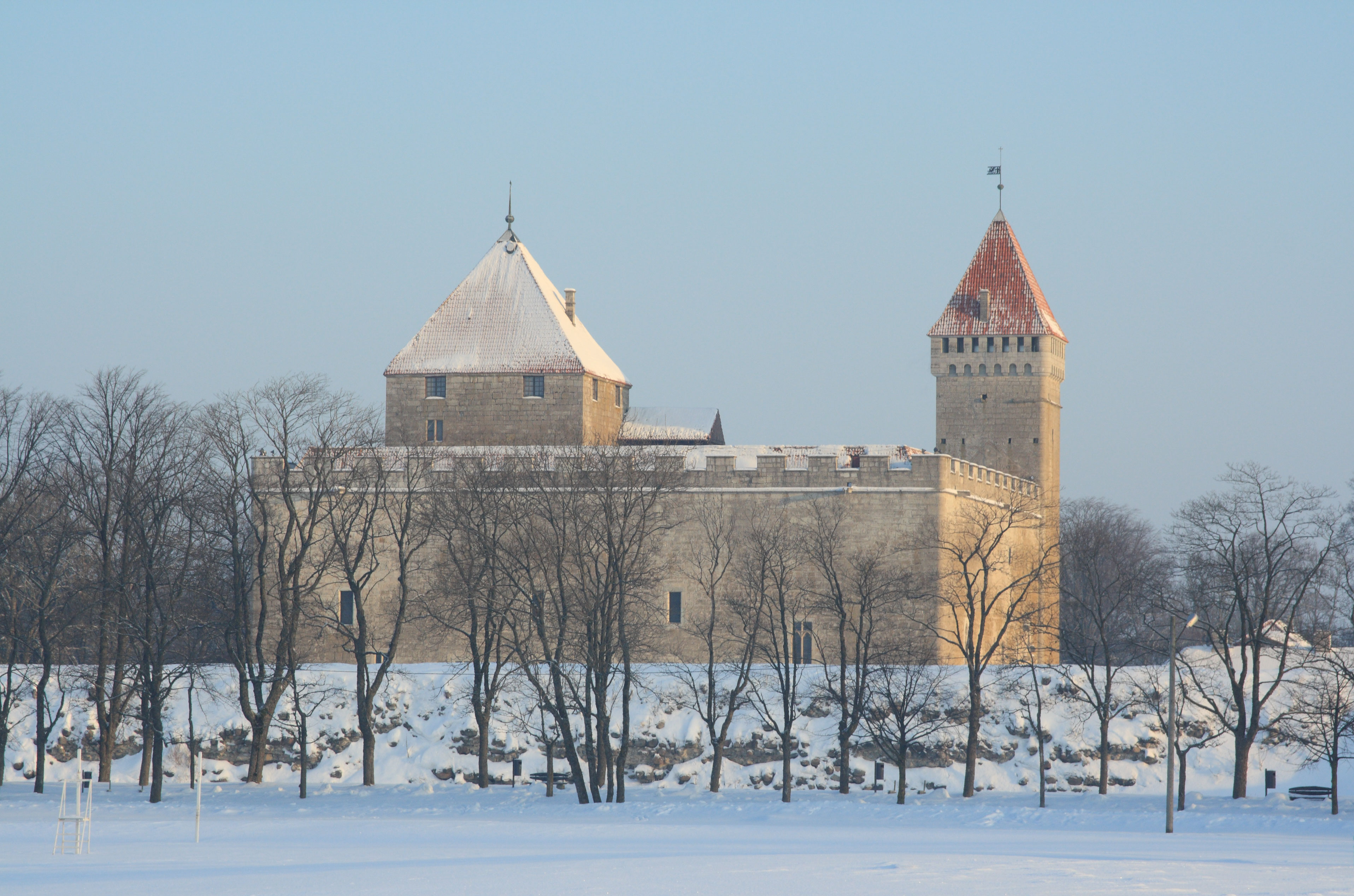
Kuressaare Castle in winter

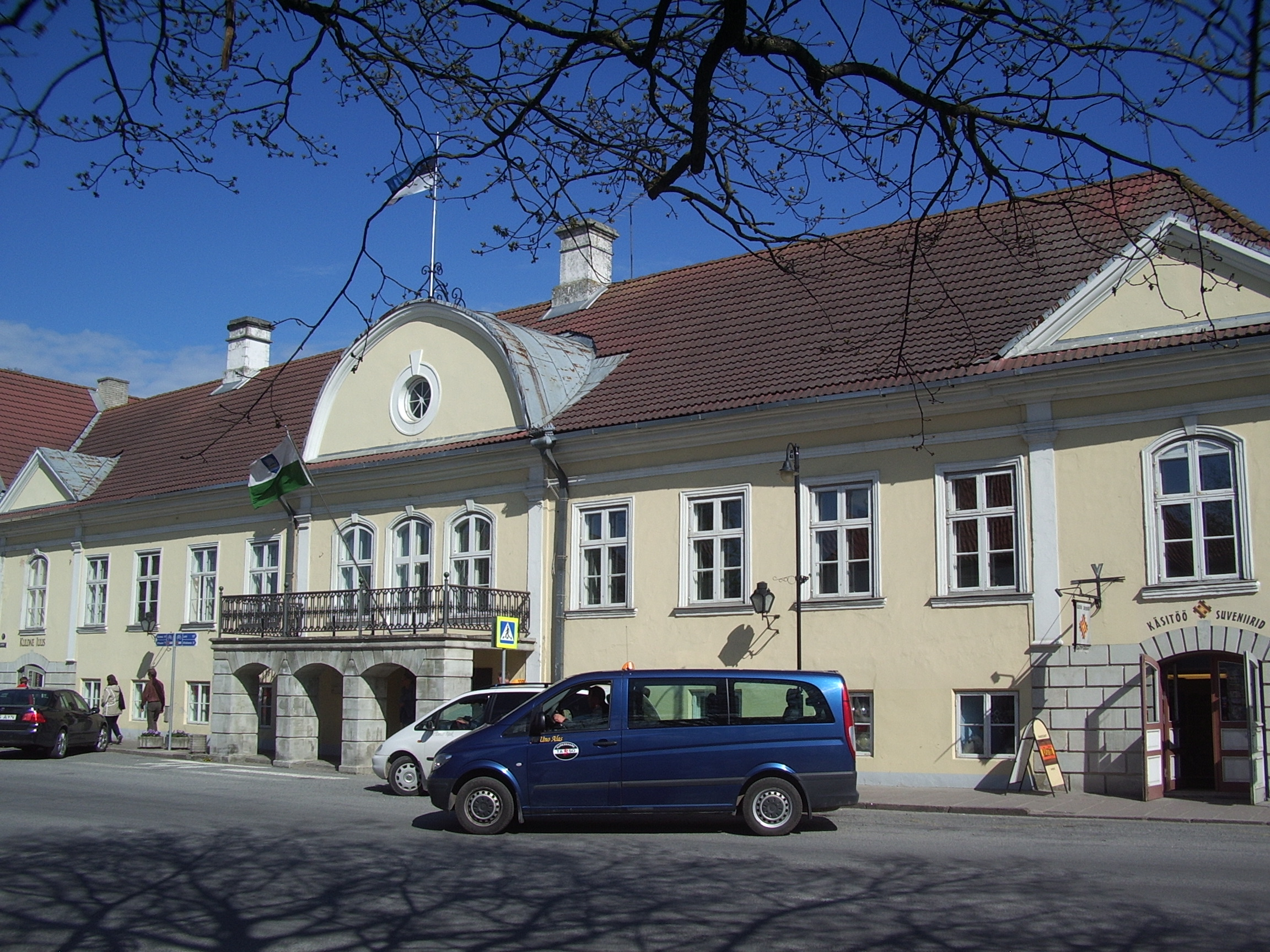
Former house of the Oesel Knighthood

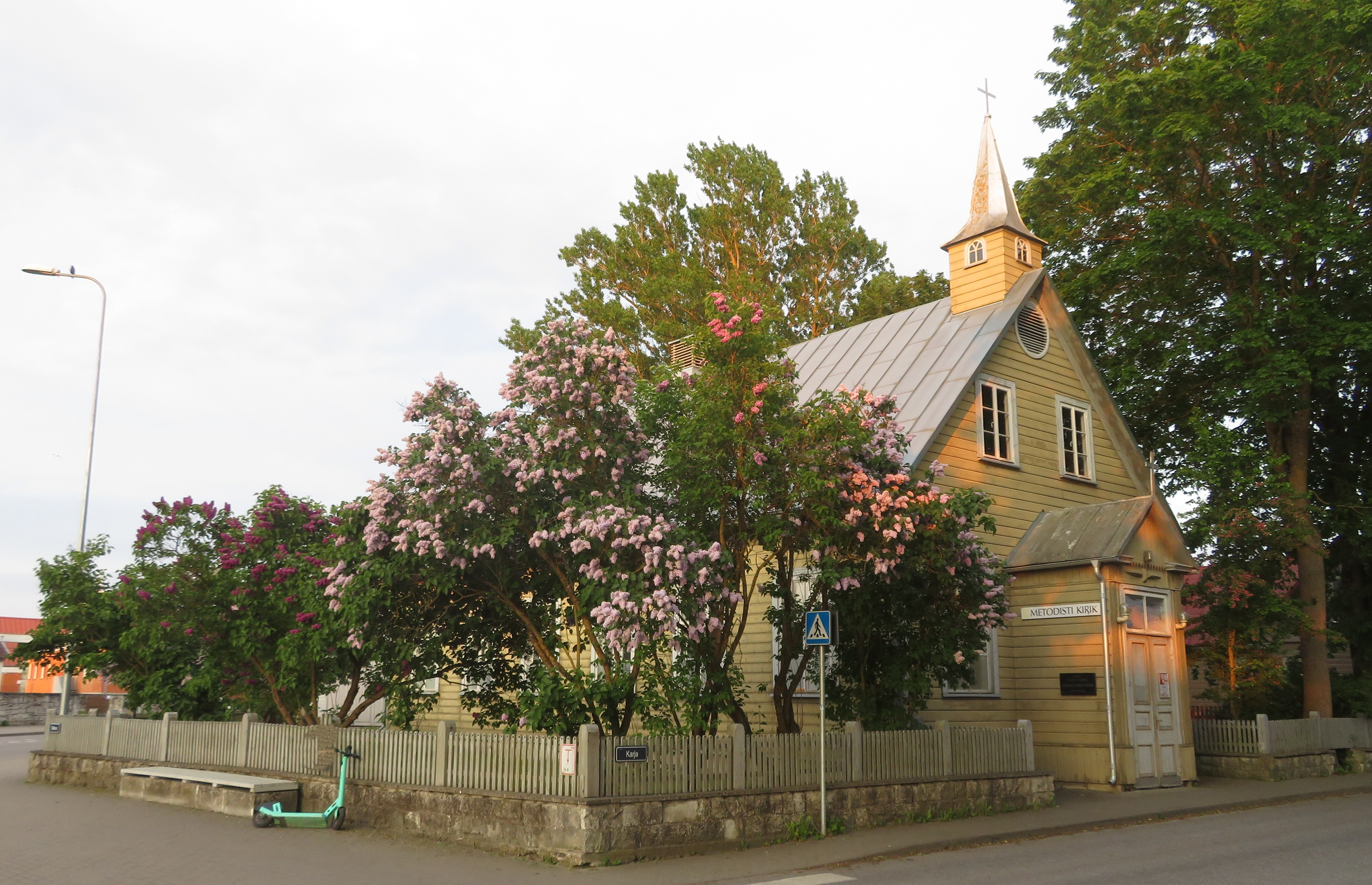
Methodist Church

== Demographics ==
Ethnic composition 1922-2021
Ethnicity	1922		1934		1941		1959		1970		1979		1989		2000		2011		2021	
Ethnicity	amount	%	amount	%	amount	%	amount	%	amount	%	amount	%	amount	%	amount	%	amount	%	amount	%
Estonians	2666	79.3	3938	87.9	3835	97.5	7884	81.1	10658	87.8	12783	90.0	14999	92.8	14548	97.5	12861	97.7	12705	97.5
Russians	156	4.64	119	2.66	40	1.02	-	-	1063	8.76	1076	7.57	833	5.15	211	1.41	159	1.21	125	0.96
Ukrainians	-	-	2	0.04	-	-	-	-	261	2.15	187	1.32	178	1.10	63	0.42	41	0.31	38	0.29
Belarusians	-	-	-	-	-	-	-	-	64	0.53	44	0.31	51	0.32	12	0.08	9	0.07	6	0.05
Finns	-	-	3	0.07	6	0.15	-	-	11	0.09	19	0.13	17	0.11	35	0.23	43	0.33	57	0.44
Jews	39	1.16	22	0.49	0	0.00	-	-	13	0.11	5	0.04	3	0.02	1	0.01	2	0.02	0	0.00
Latvians	-	-	16	0.36	9	0.23	-	-	8	0.07	15	0.11	9	0.06	9	0.06	4	0.03	8	0.06
Germans	401	11.9	321	7.17	-	-	-	-	-	-	3	0.02	7	0.04	3	0.02	2	0.02	9	0.07
Tatars	-	-	0	0.00	-	-	-	-	-	-	22	0.15	13	0.08	1	0.01	0	0.00	3	0.02
Poles	-	-	10	0.22	4	0.10	-	-	-	-	7	0.05	3	0.02	2	0.01	2	0.02	4	0.03
Lithuanians	-	-	2	0.04	1	0.03	-	-	11	0.09	11	0.08	11	0.07	5	0.03	8	0.06	13	0.10
unknown	0	0.00	5	0.11	1	0.03	0	0.00	0	0.00	0	0.00	0	0.00	17	0.11	7	0.05	11	0.08
other	102	3.03	40	0.89	39	0.99	1836	18.9	51	0.42	35	0.25	42	0.26	18	0.12	28	0.21	54	0.41
Total	3364	100	4478	100	3935	100	9720	100	12140	100	14207	100	16166	100	14925	100	13166	100	13034	99.9

== Climate ==
Kuressaare has a warm-summer humid continental climate (Dfb), bordering on an oceanic climate (Cfb).

The Estonian Environmental Agency since 2008 conducts weather observations in Roomassaare neighbourhood of Kuressaare.

Climate data for Kuressaare (Roomassaare) (2015-2024)
Month	Jan	Feb	Mar	Apr	May	Jun	Jul	Aug	Sep	Oct	Nov	Dec	Year
Mean daily maximum °C (°F)	3.9 (39.0)	3.4 (38.1)	4.8 (40.6)	10.0 (50.0)	16.7 (62.1)	21.1 (70.0)	21.9 (71.4)	21.0 (69.8)	17.7 (63.9)	13.4 (56.1)	9.3 (48.7)	5.4 (41.7)	12.4 (54.3)
Daily mean °C (°F)	−0.9 (30.4)	−0.4 (31.3)	1.2 (34.2)	5.3 (41.5)	11.1 (52.0)	16.2 (61.2)	17.9 (64.2)	17.8 (64.0)	14.1 (57.4)	8.9 (48.0)	4.7 (40.5)	1.6 (34.9)	8.1 (46.6)
Mean daily minimum °C (°F)	−8.3 (17.1)	−5.9 (21.4)	−3.6 (25.5)	0.8 (33.4)	5.6 (42.1)	10.8 (51.4)	14.4 (57.9)	14.1 (57.4)	9.6 (49.3)	3.6 (38.5)	−1.9 (28.6)	−3.7 (25.3)	3.0 (37.3)
Average precipitation mm (inches)	39.7 (1.56)	29.0 (1.14)	28.7 (1.13)	25.4 (1.00)	28.7 (1.13)	37.1 (1.46)	55.9 (2.20)	67.4 (2.65)	56.0 (2.20)	61.8 (2.43)	59.0 (2.32)	50.4 (1.98)	539.1 (21.2)
Mean monthly sunshine hours	33	78.3	161.3	253.1	360.9	370.4	339.9	228.4	208.2	119.8	43.6	29.3	2,226.2
Source: Meteorological yearbooks of Estonia for the period 2015 -2024. Estonian Environment Agency.

Its temperatures during the older observation period showed a stronger correlation with humid continental climate.

Climate data for Kuressaare (1971–1999)
Month	Jan	Feb	Mar	Apr	May	Jun	Jul	Aug	Sep	Oct	Nov	Dec	Year
Record high °C (°F)	8.3 (46.9)	10.8 (51.4)	12.1 (53.8)	24.0 (75.2)	26.2 (79.2)	31.4 (88.5)	30.9 (87.6)	32.0 (89.6)	24.5 (76.1)	18.6 (65.5)	12.6 (54.7)	9.4 (48.9)	32.0 (89.6)
Mean daily maximum °C (°F)	−0.1 (31.8)	−0.8 (30.6)	1.8 (35.2)	7.5 (45.5)	14.6 (58.3)	18.6 (65.5)	20.7 (69.3)	20.0 (68.0)	15.1 (59.2)	9.9 (49.8)	4.8 (40.6)	1.6 (34.9)	9.5 (49.1)
Daily mean °C (°F)	−2.2 (28.0)	−3.3 (26.1)	−0.9 (30.4)	3.6 (38.5)	10.0 (50.0)	14.5 (58.1)	16.9 (62.4)	16.4 (61.5)	11.9 (53.4)	7.4 (45.3)	2.8 (37.0)	−0.4 (31.3)	6.4 (43.5)
Mean daily minimum °C (°F)	−4.9 (23.2)	−6.2 (20.8)	−3.8 (25.2)	0.4 (32.7)	5.7 (42.3)	10.4 (50.7)	13.1 (55.6)	12.7 (54.9)	8.8 (47.8)	4.7 (40.5)	0.6 (33.1)	−3.1 (26.4)	3.2 (37.8)
Record low °C (°F)	−31.6 (−24.9)	−29.8 (−21.6)	−20.9 (−5.6)	−9.4 (15.1)	−3.8 (25.2)	1.0 (33.8)	6.4 (43.5)	3.7 (38.7)	−3.1 (26.4)	−9 (16)	−16.4 (2.5)	−32.6 (−26.7)	−32.6 (−26.7)
Average precipitation mm (inches)	44 (1.7)	31 (1.2)	33 (1.3)	35 (1.4)	32 (1.3)	49 (1.9)	58 (2.3)	63 (2.5)	71 (2.8)	72 (2.8)	72 (2.8)	59 (2.3)	617 (24.3)
Average precipitation days (≥ 1.0 mm)	11	8	9	8	6	7	7	10	12	12	14	14	118
Average relative humidity (%)	87	86	85	79	71	75	78	80	82	84	86	87	82
Source: Estonian Weather Service

== Economy ==
=== Transportation ===
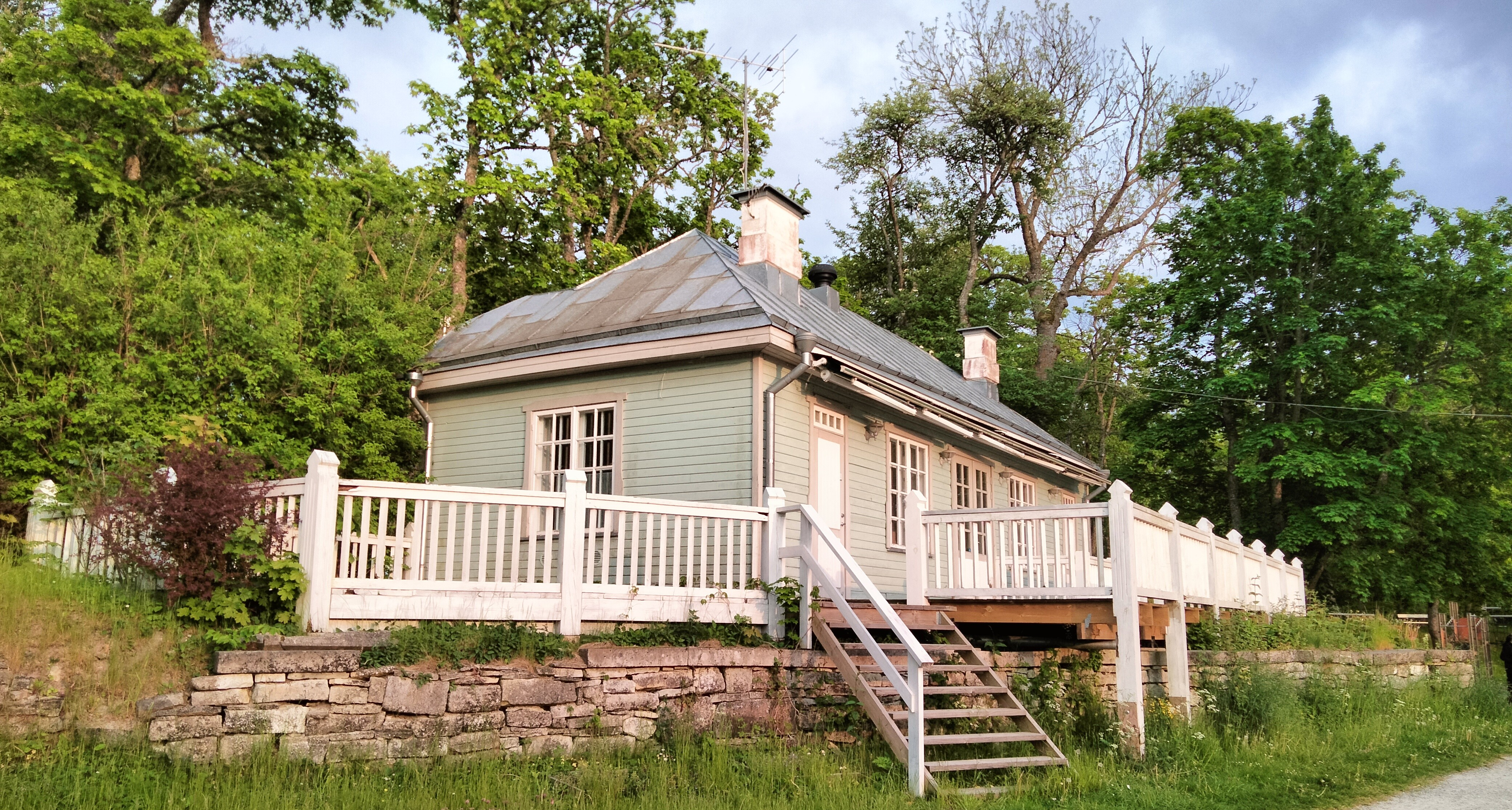
Former railway station, reconstructed in 1990

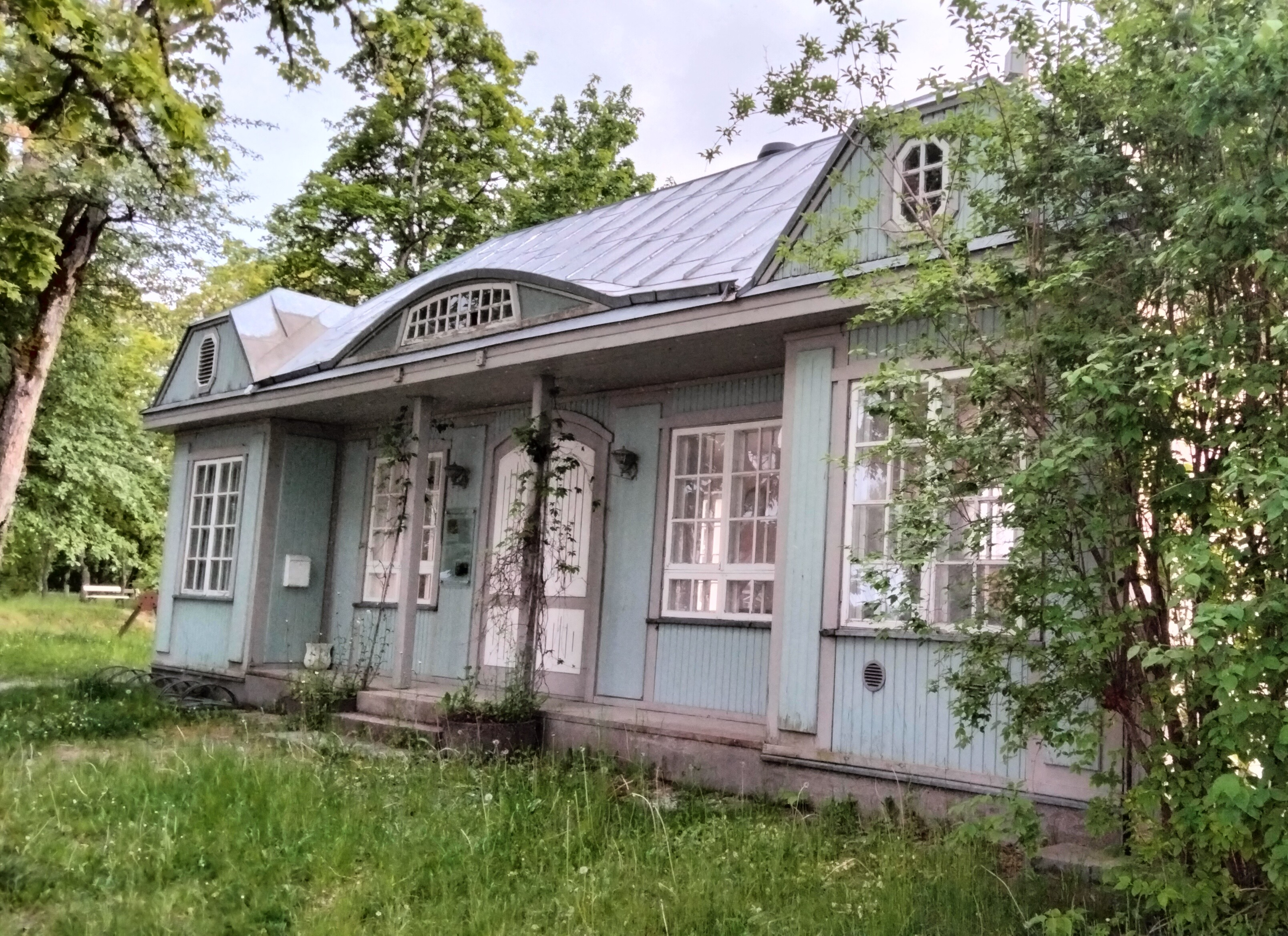
Former railway station, reconstructed in 1990

Kuressaare is served by Kuressaare Airport, located on a peninsula southeast of the city. There is regular traffic to Tallinn, as well as seasonal flights to the island of Ruhnu.

There are bus connections around the island, as well as with Kuivastu on Muhu Island, a ferry terminal with connection to the mainland.

In 1917, during the German occupation, an urban railway was built in Kuressaare, and in 1918, it was transferred to the town administration. It connected the port with the city center. One of the stations was provisionally located in Kurhouse, and in 1924, the dedicated Park Station was built. The railway functioned until the 1930s when it was gradually disused and mostly dismantled. An attempt to revive the railway in the beginning of the 1950s, during the Soviet period, was unsuccessful, and ended up with rails fully removed from the streets. In 1990, the railway station was reconstructed using old photos.

== Notable people ==
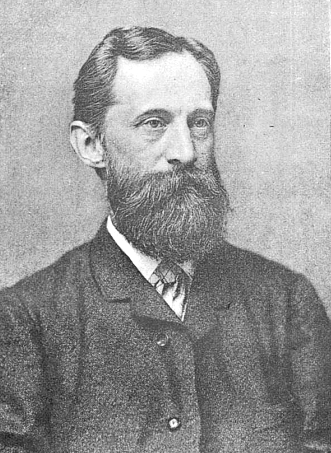
Eugen Dücker, c.1885

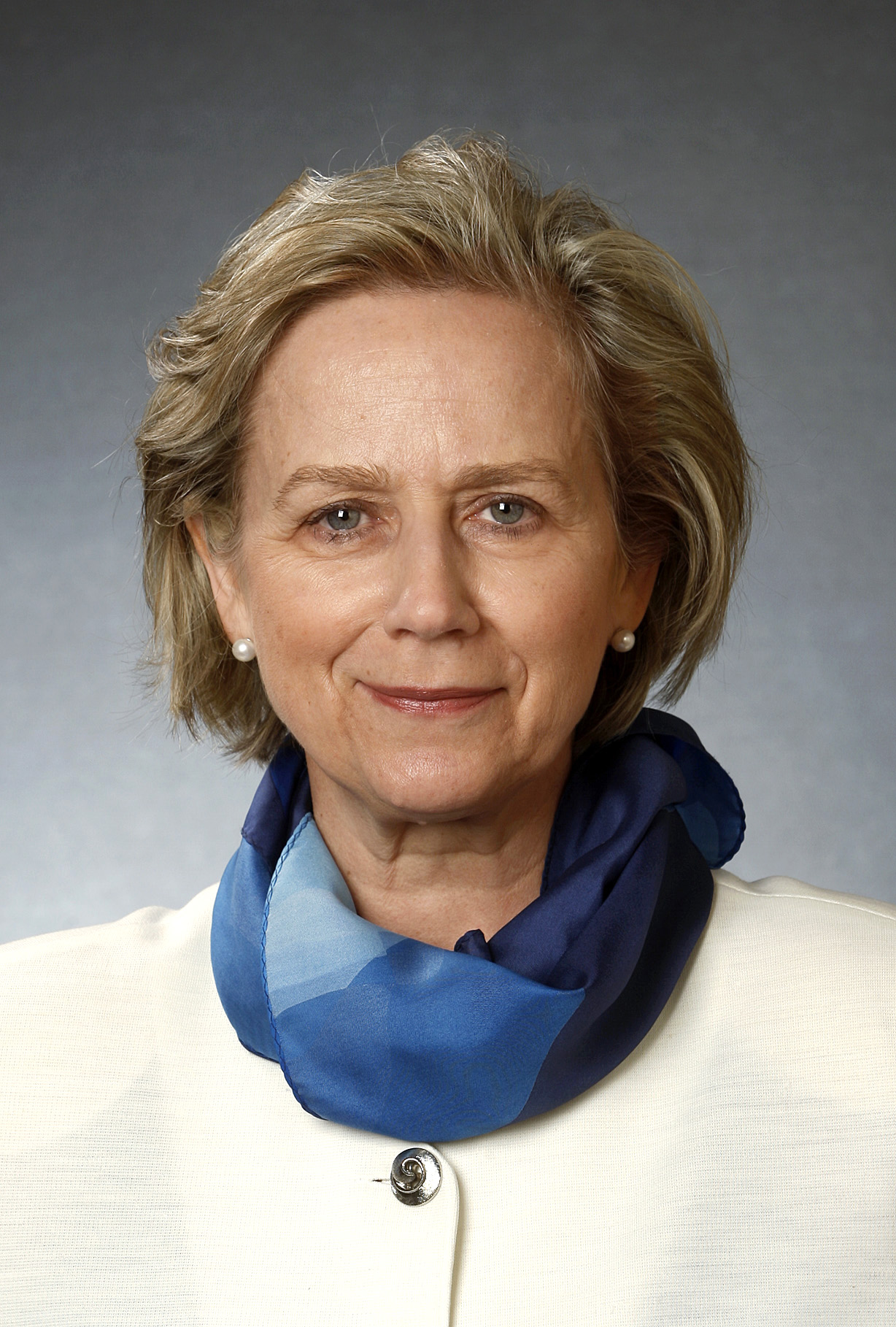
Urve Tiidus, 2011

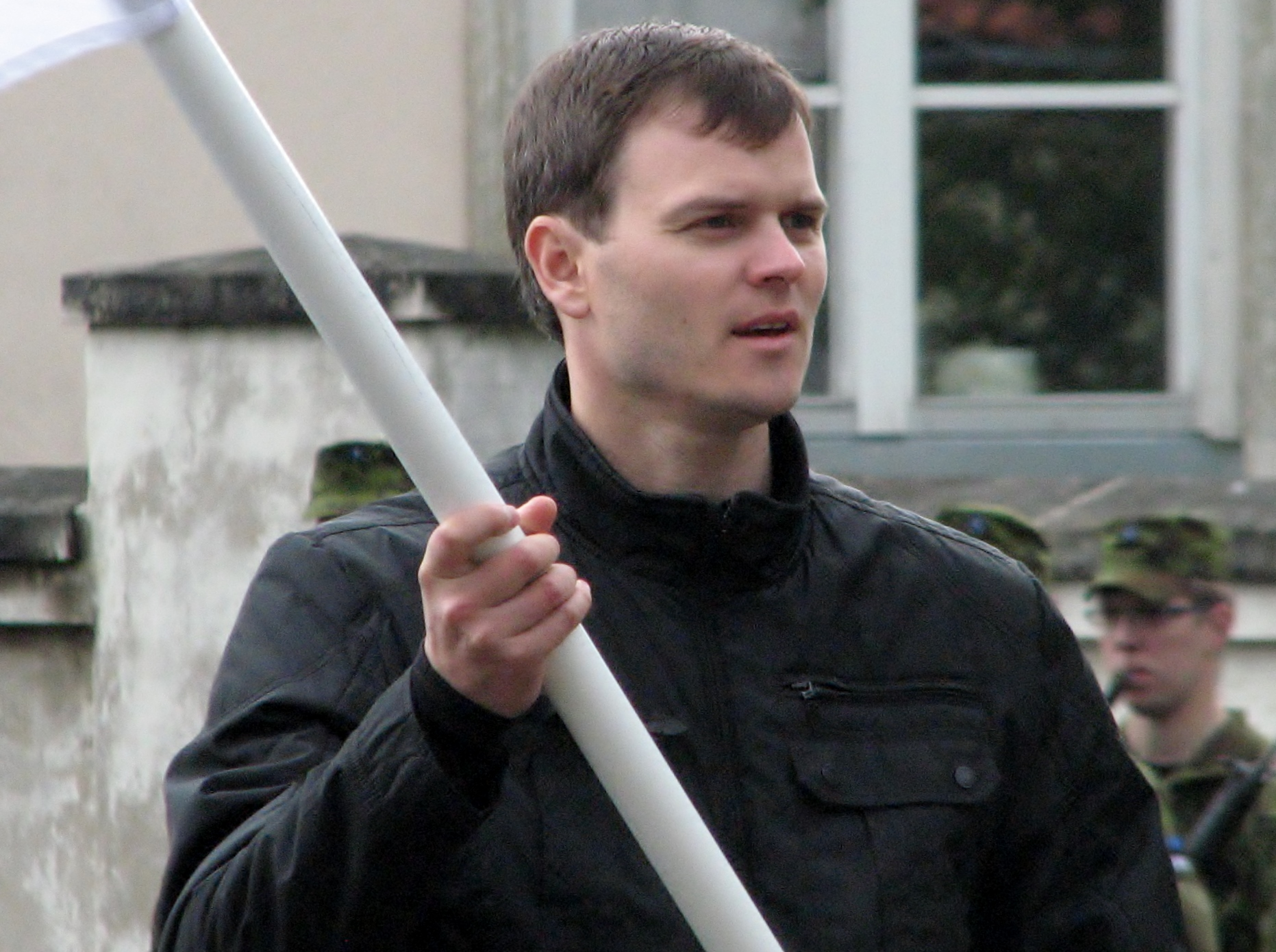
Madis Kallas, 2014

- Karen Sehested (1606–1672), Danish court official
- Hannibal Sehested (1609–1666), Danish statesman.
- Adam Georg von Agthe (1777–1826), Baltic German major general in the Imperial Russian Army
- Alexander Vostokov (1781–1864), Baltic German Russian philologist and poet
- Richard Maack (1825–1886), Baltic German Russian naturalist, geographer and anthropologist
- Eugen Dücker (1841–1916), Baltic German painter
- Richard Otto Zöpffel (1843–1891), Baltic German church historian and theologian
- Axel von Freytagh-Loringhoven (1878–1942), a Baltic German professor of constitutional and international law
- Viktor Kingissepp (1888–1922), Estonian communist politician
- Benno Schotz (1891–1984), Scottish sculptor, immigrated to Glasgow in 1912
- Gerd Neggo (1891–1974), Estonian dancer and choreographer
- Boris Sepp (1894–1942), an Estonian lawyer and politician.
- Louis Kahn (1901–1974), American architect
- Adelaida Lemberg (1904–1986), Estonian journalist and translator
- Bernd Freytag von Loringhoven (1914–2007), Baltic German military officer
- Ivar Karl Ugi (1930–2005), German chemist, developed the Ugi reaction
- Sulev Nõmmik (1931–1992), Estonian actor, director, humorist and dancer
- Heli Lääts (1932–2018), Estonian singer
- Ivo Linna (born 1949), Estonian singer
- Tiiu Aro (born 1952), Estonian physician and politician
- Tõnis Palts (born 1953), Estonian politician and businessman, Mayor of Tallinn 2001
- Jüri Pihl (1954–2019), Estonian police officer and politician
- Urve Tiidus (born 1954), an Estonian politician, Mayor of Kuressaare
- Tarmo Teder (born 1958), Estonian writer, poet and critic
- Jaanus Tamkivi (born 1959), Estonian politician, Mayor of Kuressaare
- Margus Oopkaup (1959–2025), Estonian stage, film and TV actor and playwright
- Tullio Liblik (born 1964), Estonian entrepreneur
- Ilmar Raag (born 1968), Estonian film director and media personality
- Hannes Hanso (born 1971), Estonian politician and diplomat, Mayor of Kuressaare, 2013 to 2015.
- Indrek Saar (born 1973), Estonian actor and politician
- Maria Faust (born 1979), Estonian saxophone player and composer
- Madis Kallas (born 1981), decathlete and Mayor of Saaremaa Municipality, 2017-2020 and 2021-2022
- Adeele Jaago (born 1989), Estonian stage, film, and TV actress.
- Jörgen Liik (1990-2025), Estonian actor
- Tuuli Rand (born 1990), Estonian singer
- Grete Paia (born 1995), Estonian singer and songwriter

=== Sport ===
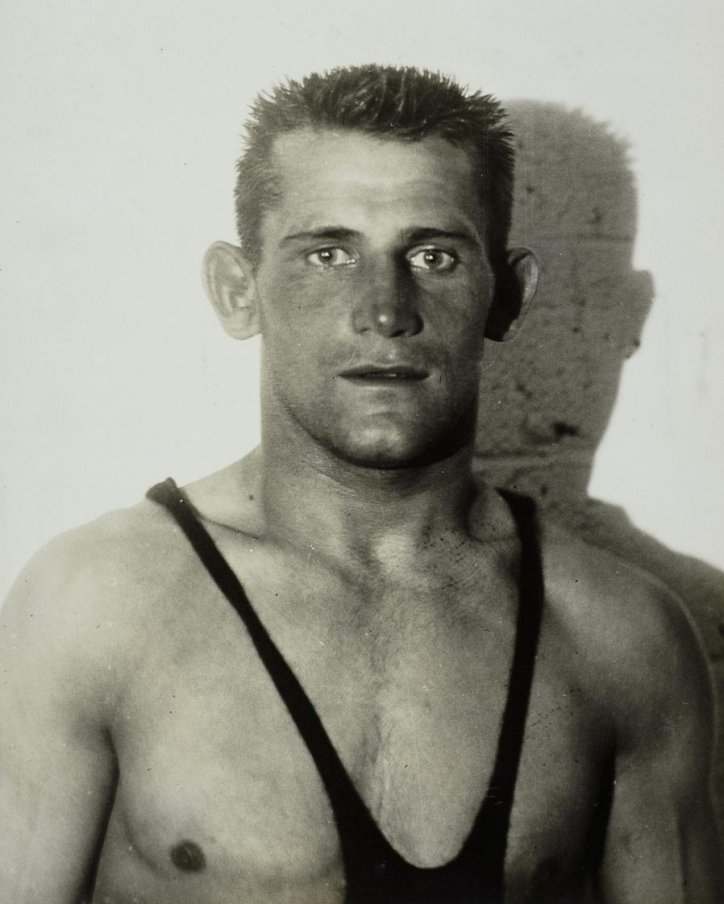
Voldemar Väli, 1928

- Voldemar Väli (1903–1997), wrestler, gold and bronze medallist at the 1928 and 1936 Summer Olympics
- Mihail Velsvebel (1926–2008), runner, competed in the men's 1500 metres at the 1952 Summer Olympics
- Mikk Pahapill (born 1983), decathlete
- Mihkel Aksalu (born 1984), football goalkeeper who played 483 games and 46 for Estonia
- Tiidrek Nurme (born 1985), long and middle-distance runner
- Keith Pupart (born 1985), volleyball player
- Marek Niit (born 1987), sprinter
- Getter Saar (born 1992), badminton player
- Mihkel Räim (born 1993), cyclist
- Risto Lillemets (born 1997), multi-event athlete.

== Twin towns and sister cities ==
The former municipality of Kuressaare (until 2017) was twinned with:

- Ekenäs, Finland (since 21 November 1988)
- Kuurne, Belgium (since 9 August 1998)
- Mariehamn, Finland (since 24 October 1991)
- Rønne, Denmark (since 3 October 1991)
- Skövde, Sweden (since 23 June 1993)
- Talsi, Latvia (since 27 May 1998)
- Turku, Finland (since 30 May 1996)
- Vammala, Finland (since 30 June 1994)

== Significant depictions in popular culture ==
- Arensburg (Kuressaare) is one of the starting towns of the State of the Teutonic Order in the turn-based strategy game Medieval II: Total War: Kingdoms.

== See also ==
- List of cities and towns in Estonia
