= Karaski, Põlva County =

Village in Estonia

Coordinates: 58°03′N 26°52′E

Karaski
- Village
- Interactive map of Karaski
- Country: Estonia
- County: Põlva County
- Parish: Kanepi Parish
- Time zone: UTC+2 (EET)
  - Summer (DST): UTC+3 (EEST)

Karaski is a village in Kanepi Parish, Põlva County in southeastern Estonia.

== Notable people ==
Notable people that were born or lived in Karaski include the following:

- Aksel Mark (1913–2014), politician, journalist, newspaper editor, and agronomist
