= Members of the 6th Riigikogu =

Members of Parliament of Estonia 1938–1940

This is a list of members of the sixth legislative session of the Estonian Parliament (Riigikogu) following the 1938 elections (held on 24–25 February 1938). It sat between 7 April 1938 and 5 July 1940, after which Estonia was occupied by the Soviet Union for the first time. Estonia's previous unicameral parliamentary system had been suspended in 1934 and formally dissolved in 1937; on 1 January 1938, the country's Third Constitution came into force, creating a bicameral National Assembly, consisting of the Chamber of Deputies (Riigivolikogu) and the National Council (Riiginõukogu). These were de facto dissolved when the Soviet Union occupied Estonia and established the Supreme Soviet of the Estonian Soviet Socialist Republic.

== The Chamber of Deputies (Riigivolikogu) ==
=== Officers ===
The following is a list of the Riigivolikogu officers during the Riigikogu's sixth legislative session:

==== Chairman ====
- Jüri Uluots, 21 April 1938 – 12 October 1939
- Otto Pukk, from 17 October 1939

==== First Assistant Chairman ====
- Ado Anderkopp, from 21 April 1938

==== Second Assistant Chairman ====
- Otto Pukk, 21 April 1938 – 17 October 1939
- Rudolf Penno, from 17 October 1939

==== Secretary-General ====
- Eugen Madisoo

==== Secretary ====
- Peeter Malvet

=== List of members ===
Name	Start of term	End of term
Aleksander Aben	Start of session	26 August 1939 (replaced by Aleksander Jõeäär)
Ado Anderkopp	Start of session	End of session
Eduard Arnover	Start of session	End of session
Kaarel August Eenpalu	Start of session	End of session
Oskar Gustavson	Start of session	End of session
Ernst Haabpiht	Start of session	End of session
Mihkel Hansen	Start of session	End of session
Voldemar Jaanus	29 November 1939 (replacing Karl Selter)	End of session
Kristjan-Eduard Jalak	Start of session	End of session
Karl-Arnold Jalakas	Start of session	End of session
Leopold Johannes Johanson	Start of session	End of session
Aleksander Jõeäär	17 October 1939 (replacing Aleksander Aben)	End of session
August Jürima (the younger)	Start of session	End of session
August Jürima (the elder)	Start of session	End of session
Mihkel Jüris	Start of session	End of session
Karl Jürison	Start of session	End of session
Juhan Kaarlimäe	Start of session	End of session
Valter-Gerhard Kadarik	Start of session	End of session
Nigul Kaliste	Start of session	End of session
Jakob Kalle	Start of session	End of session
Alo Karineel	Start of session	End of session
Oskar Kask	Start of session	End of session
Artur Leonhard Kasterpalu	Start of session	End of session
Karl Kaups	Start of session	End of session
Albert Kendra	Start of session	End of session
Tõnis Kint	Start of session	End of session
Jaan Kokk	Start of session	End of session
Evald Konno	Start of session	End of session
Hugo Villi Kukke	Start of session	End of session
Kustav Kurg	Start of session	End of session
Oskar Köster	Start of session	End of session
August Laur	Start of session	End of session
Elmar-Aleksander Lehtmets	Start of session	End of session
Jüri Looväli	Start of session	End of session
Oskar Lõvi	Start of session	End of session
Märt Martinson	Start of session	End of session
Louis Metslang	Start of session	End of session
August Miljan	Start of session	End of session
Jaan Murro	Start of session	End of session
August Mälk	Start of session	End of session
Johannes Nyman	Start of session	End of session
Ants Oidermaa	Start of session	End of session
Georgi Orlov	Start of session	End of session
Aleksander Ossipov	Start of session	End of session
Karl Eduard Pajos	Start of session	End of session
Eduard Pedosk	Start of session	End of session
Rudolf Penno	Start of session	End of session
Johannes Perens	Start of session	End of session
Ants Piip	Start of session	End of session
Juhan Piirimaa	Start of session	End of session
Otto Pukk	Start of session	End of session
Karl Puusemp	Start of session	End of session
Jaan Põdra	Start of session	End of session
Viktor Päts	Start of session	End of session
Aleksander Rei	Start of session	End of session
Mihkel Reimann	Start of session	End of session
Eduard Riisna	Start of session	End of session
Rudolf Riives	Start of session	End of session
Karl Roomet	Start of session	End of session
Ado Roosiorg	Start of session	End of session
Vladimir Roslavlev	Start of session	End of session
Neeme Ruus	Start of session	End of session
Martin Rõigas	Start of session	End of session
Aleksander Saar	Start of session	End of session
Karl Selter	Start of session	29 November 1939 (replaced by Voldemar Jaanus)
Oskar Albert Suursööt	Start of session	End of session
Märt Sõrra	Start of session	End of session
Karl Ernst Särgava	Start of session	End of session
Järvo Tandre	Start of session	End of session
Arnold Tartu	Start of session	End of session
Henn Treial	Start of session	End of session
Aleksis Tsänk	Start of session	End of session
Artur Tupits	Start of session	End of session
Jaan Tõnisson	Start of session	End of session
Jüri Uluots	Start of session	End of session
Maksim Unt	Start of session	End of session
Juhan Uuemaa	Start of session	End of session
Leonhard Vahter	Start of session	End of session
Jaan Vain	Start of session	End of session
Värdi Velner	Start of session	End of session
Nikolai Viitak	Start of session	End of session
Julius Voolaid	Start of session	End of session

== The National Council (Riiginõukogu) ==
=== Officers ===
The following is a list of the Riiginõukogu officers during the Riigikogu's sixth legislative session:

==== Chairman ====
- Mihkel Pung

==== Assistant Chairmen ====
- Alfred Maurer
- Heinrich Lauri

==== Secretary-General ====
- Artur Mägi

==== Secretary ====
- Herman Soone

=== List of members ===
Name	Start of term	End of term
Friedrich Karl Akel	Start of session	End of session
Johannes-Leopold Antik	Start of session	End of session
Linda Marie Eenpalu	Start of session	End of session
Johan Hagivang	Start of session	End of session
Kaarel Heinver	Start of session	End of session
Johan Holberg	Start of session	End of session
Jüri Jaakson	Start of session	End of session
Richard Hugo Kaho	Start of session	End of session
Aleksander Kask	Start of session	End of session
Harry Eduard Ottokar Koch	Start of session	3 December 1938 (replaced by Wilhelm Baron von Wrangell)
Paul Nikolai Kogerman	Start of session	24 October 1939 (replaced by Jüri Nuut)
August Kohver	Start of session	End of session
Johannes Kurvits	Start of session	End of session
Johan Kõpp	9 January 1940 (replacing Hugo Bernhard Rahamägi)	End of session
Johan Laidoner	Start of session	22 June 1940 (mandate ended)
Heinrich Lauri	Start of session	End of session
Hans Leesment	Start of session	End of session
Rein Marrandi	Start of session	End of session
Jaan Masing	Start of session	End of session
Alfred Maurer	Start of session	End of session
Alfred Julius Mõttus	Start of session	End of session
Johan Müller	Start of session	End of session
Aleksander Naeres	Start of session	End of session
Heinrich Neuhaus	Start of session	End of session
Jüri Nuut	24 October 1939 (replacing Paul Nikolai Kogermani)	End of session
Aleksander Oinas	Start of session	End of session
Aleksander Onno	Start of session	End of session
Johannes Orasmaa	Start of session	28 June 1940 (resigned)
Hendrik Otstavel	Start of session	End of session
Aleksander Paulus	Start of session	End of session
Joakim Puhk	Start of session	End of session
Mihkel Pung	Start of session	End of session
Peeter Puusep	Start of session	End of session
Voldemar Päts	Start of session	End of session
Hugo Bernhard Rahamägi	Start of session	6 October 1939 (replaced by Johan Kõpp)
Bernhard Aleksander Roostfelt	Start of session	End of session
Johan-Oskar Rütli	Start of session	End of session
Johan Sihver	Start of session	End of session
Jaan Soots	Start of session	End of session
Karl Johannes Terras	Start of session	End of session
Aleksander Tõnisson	Start of session	End of session
Anton Uesson	Start of session	End of session
Wilhelm von Wrangell	13 January 1939 (replacing Harry Eduard Ottokar Kochi)	18 December 1939 (mandate ended)

== Further information ==
- "VI Riigikogu (Riigivolikogu ja Riiginõukogu) [The sixth Riigikogu (the Chamber of Deputies and the National Council)]", Riigikogu (in Estonian).
