= 1938 Estonian parliamentary election =

- 24-25 February 1938

All 80 seats in the Riigivolikogu 41 seats needed for a majority
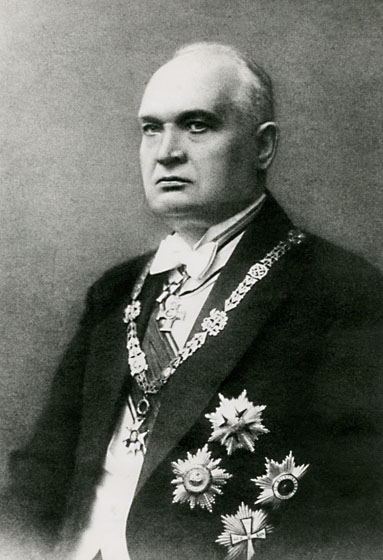

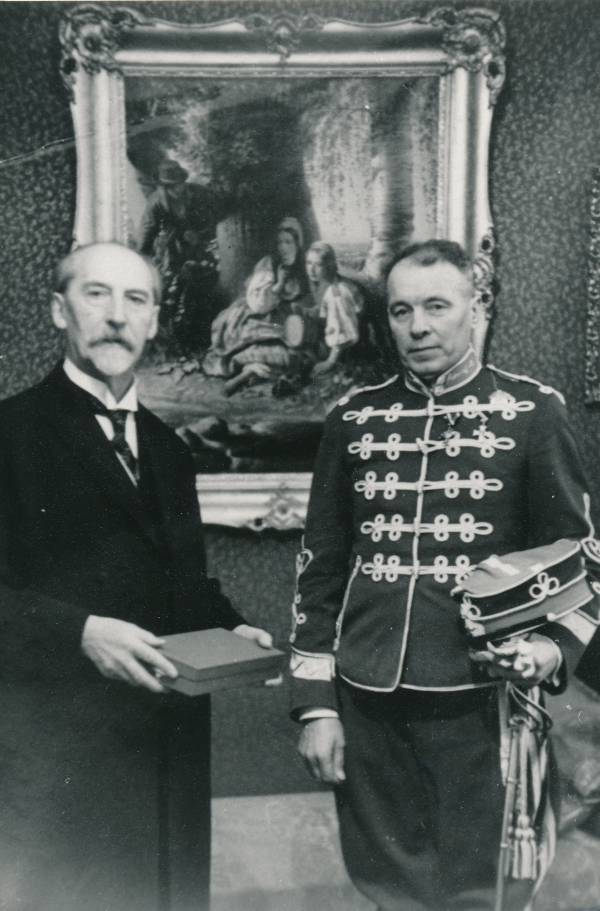
	First party	Second party
Leader	Konstantin Päts (de facto)	Jaan Tõnisson (de facto) (Note: Considered the leader of Estonia's democratic opposition)
Party	PER	Independents
Seats won	64	16
Popular vote	256,213	189,929
Percentage	57.43%	42.57%
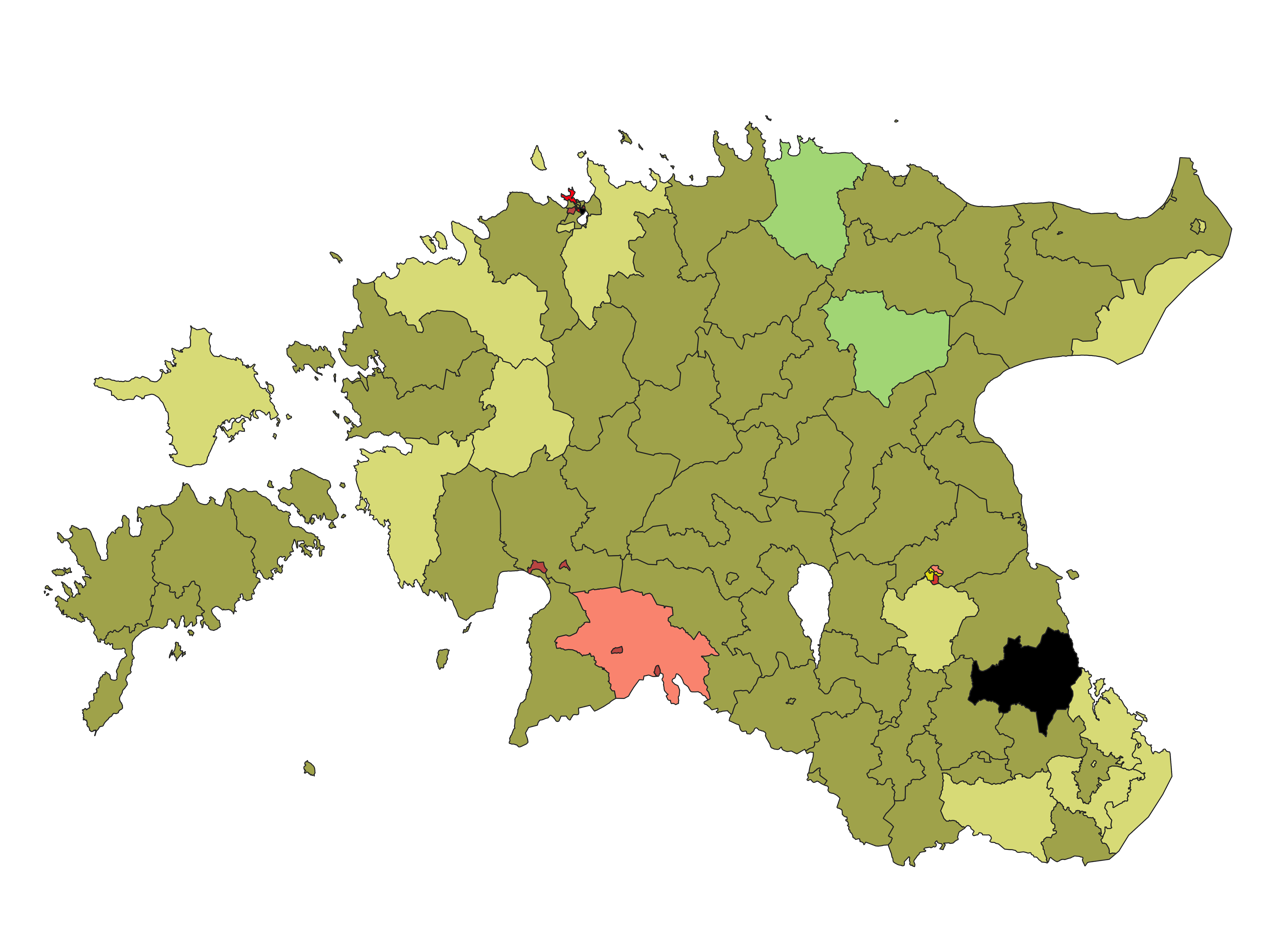
- Results by constituency PER PER supporters Former RKE members Former Settlers Former Vaps members EKP-aligned Former ESTP members Metslang-allied socialists

Parliamentary elections were held in Estonia on 24 and 25 February 1938. The National Front for the Implementation of the Constitution won 64 of the 80 seats. In turn, the Front was essentially an enlarged version of the pro-government Patriotic League.

Of the 16 independents elected, six were members of the Democracy Group (composed of two former members of the National Centre Party, two Settlers and two of the Vaps Movement), another six were members of the Unity Group of Working People (composed of four leftist Socialists and two rightist Socialists), two were Independent Workers and two were members of the Russian Group.

== Electoral system ==
Following the promulgation of a new constitution, the voting age was raised to 22 years and only those who had been citizens for three years could vote, while the minimum age for candidates was raised from 20 to 25.

== Results ==
Party	Votes	%	Seats
National Front for the Implementation of the Constitution	256,213	57.43	64
Independents	189,929	42.57	16
Total	446,142	100.00	80
Registered voters/turnout	640,000	–	
Source: Nohlen & Stöver

=== By constituency ===
District	Winner	Alignment	Group
1	Ado Anderkopp	PER	—N/a
2	Louis Metslang	Metslangist	—N/a
3	Järvo Tandre	PER	—N/a
4	Neeme Ruus	PTK	Working People's Unity Group
5	Johannes Nyman	PER	—N/a
6	Oskar Lõvi	Vaps	Group of Democrats
7	Karl Jürison	PER	—N/a
8	Leopold Johanson	Metslangist	—N/a
9	Aleksander Aben	PTK	Working People's Unity Group
10	Eduard Riismann	PER	—N/a
11	Ernst Särgava	PER	—N/a
12	Karl-Arnold Jalakas	PER	—N/a
13	Julius Voolaid	PER	—N/a
14	Oskar Suursööt	PER	—N/a
15	Valter-Gerhard Kadarik	PER	—N/a
16	Mihkel Jüris	PER	—N/a
17	Jakob Kalle	PER	—N/a
18	Kustav Kurg	PER	—N/a
19	August Miljan	PER	—N/a
20	August Jürima	PER	—N/a
21	Nikolai Viitak	PER	—N/a
22	Mihkel Reimann	PER	—N/a
23	Karl Kaups	PER	—N/a
24	Ado Roosiorg	PER	—N/a
25	Eduard Arnover	PER	—N/a
26	Artur Kasterpalu	PER	—N/a
27	Aleksander Saar	PER	—N/a
28	Nigul Kaliste	PER	—N/a
29	Vladimir Roslavlev	Russian Group	Russian Group
30	Georgi Orlov	Russian Group	Russian Group
31	Aleksis Tsänk	PER	—N/a
32	Oskar Kask	PER	—N/a
33	Maksim Unt	PTK	Working People's Unity Group
34	Ants Oidermaa	PER	—N/a
35	Juhan Kaarlimäe	PER	—N/a
36	Viktor Päts	PER	—N/a
37	Jüri Looväli	PER	—N/a
38	Oskar Gustavson	ESTP	Working People's Unity Group
39	Aleksander Rei	PER	—N/a
40	Otto Pukk	PER	—N/a
41	August Mälk	PER	—N/a
42	Johannes Perens	PER	—N/a
43	Jaan Vain	ESTP	Working People's Unity Group
44	Ants Piip	RKE	Group of Democrats
45	Jaan Tõnisson	RKE	Group of Democrats
46	Kristjan-Eduard Jalak	EKP	Working People's Unity Group
47	Karl Roomet	PER	—N/a
48	August Jürima	PER	
49	Ernst Haabpiht	PER	—N/a
50	Märt Sõrra	PER	—N/a
51	Jüri Uluots	PER	—N/a
52	Henn Treial	PER	—N/a
53	Rudolf Riives	PER	—N/a
54	Artur Tupits	PER	—N/a
55	Mart Rõigas	PER	—N/a
56	Jaan Kokk	PER	—N/a
57	Juhan Uuemaa	PER	—N/a
58	Värdi Velner	PER	—N/a
59	Evald Konno	PER	—N/a
60	August Laur	PER	—N/a
61	Jaan Põdra	PER	—N/a
62	Tõnis Kint	PER	—N/a
63	Märt Martinson	PER	—N/a
64	Mihkel Hansen	PER	—N/a
65	Leonhard Vahter	PER	—N/a
66	Aleksander Ossipov	Russian Group	Russian Group
67	Rudolf Penno	Settlers	Group of Democrats
68	Arnold Tartu	PER	—N/a
69	Oskar Köster	Settlers	Group of Democrats
70	Karl-Eduard Pajos	PER	—N/a
71	Juhan Piirimaa	PER	—N/a
72	Hugo Kukke	PER	—N/a
73	Elmar-Aleksander Lehtmets	PER	—N/a
74	Karl Selter	PER	—N/a
75	Karl Puusemp	PER	—N/a
76	Albert Kendra	PER	—N/a
77	Alo Karineel	PER	—N/a
78	Eduard Peedosk	Vaps	Group of Democrats
79	Kaarel Eenpalu	PER	—N/a
80	Jaan Murro	PER	—N/a
	Source: Parteideta parlament - VI Riigikogu 1938-1940 p. 4–5		

== See also ==
- VI Riigikogu
