= Jaan (given name) =

Male given name

- Gender: Male
- Language: Estonian
- Name day: 24 June

Origin
- Region of origin: Estonia

Jaan is an Estonian masculine name, a cognate of the English-language given name John.

People named Jaan include:

- Jaan Anvelt (1884–1937), Estonian communist revolutionary
- Jaan Arder (1952–2014), Estonian singer
- Jaan Ehlvest (born 1962), Estonian chess player
- Jaan Eigo (1866–1946), Estonian politician
- Jaan Eilart (1933–2006), Estonian biologist
- Jaan Einasto (born 1929), Estonian astrophysicist
- Jaan Elken (born 1954), Estonian painter, art critic, curator and art educator
- Jaan Hargel (1912–1966), Estonian conductor, music teacher, oboe player and flautist
- Jaan Eslon (1952–2000), Estonian-Swedish chess player
- Jaan Hünerson (1882–1942), Estonian agronomist and politician
- Jaan Isotamm (1939–2014), Estonian poet
- Jaan Jaago (1887–1949), Estonian wrestler
- Jaan Jung (1835–1900), Estonian educator, archeologist and historian
- Jaan Jüris (born 1977), Estonian ski jumper
- Jaan Kalviste (1898–1936), Estonian chemist, educator, and translator
- Jaan Kaplinski (1941–2021), Estonian poet, philosopher, and culture critic
- Jaan Kärner (1891–1958), Estonian poet and writer
- Jaan Kiivit Sr. (1906–1971), Estonian Archbishop
- Jaan Kiivit, Jr. (1940–2005), Estonian Archbishop
- Jaan Kikkas (1892–1944), Estonian weightlifter
- Jaan Kirsipuu (born 1969), Estonian road bicycle racer
- Jaan Klõšeiko (1939–2016), Estonian printmaker and photographer
- Jaan Kolberg (born 1958), Estonian film director and producer
- Jaan Kokk (1903–1942), Estonian politician
- Jaan Kriisa (1882–1942), Estonian lawyer and politician
- Jaan Kross (1920–2007), Estonian contemporary writer
- Jaan Kruus (1884–1942), Estonian military General
- Jaan Kruusvall (1940–2012), Estonian writer and playwright
- Jaan Kundla (born 1937), Estonian politician
- Jaan Kurn (1893–1981), Estonian teacher, poet and translator
- Jaan Laaman (born 1948), Estonian-born American member of the United Freedom Front
- Jaan Lattik, (1878–1967), Estonian politician and writer
- Jaan Leetsar (1946–2026), Estonian politician
- Jaan Lepp (1895–1941), Estonian track and field athlete and soldier
- Jaan J. Leppik (born 1969), Estonian clergyman and politician
- Jaan Lippmaa (1942–2021), Estonian engineer and politician
- Jaan Lõo (1872–1939), Estonian Supreme Court judge, poet and politician
- Jaan Luik (born 1953), Estonian sculptor
- Jaan Lüllemets (1932–2004), Estonian politician
- Jaan Maide (1896–1945), Estonian Army officer and commander
- Jaan Manitski (born 1942), Estonian politician
- Jaan Mark (born 1951), Estonian politician
- Jaan Masing (1875–1948), Estonian politician
- Jaan Miger (1859–1940), Estonian politician
- Jaan Murro (1903–1969), Estonian editor, journalist and politician
- Jaan Patterson (born 1975), German American writer and composer, founder of the netlabel Surrism-Phonoethics
- Jaan Pehk (born 1975), Estonian writer, singer and guitarist
- Jaan Piiskar (1883–1942), Estonian educator and politician
- Jaan Põdra (1894–1942), Estonian politician
- Jaan Port (1891–1951), Estonian botanist
- Jaan Poska (1866–1920), Estonian barrister and politician
- Jaan Puhvel (1932–2026), Estonian-American Indo-Europeanist
- Jaan Puidet (born 1992), Estonian basketball player
- Jaan-Mati Punning (1940–2009), Estonian geochemist, paleogeographer and ecologist
- Jaan Rääts (1932–2020), Estonian film score composer
- Jaan Rannap (1931–2023), Estonian children's writer
- Jaan Raudsepp (1873–1945), Estonian politician
- Jaan Rekkor (born 1958), Estonian actor
- Jaan Roose (born 1992), Estonian slackliner and stuntman
- Jaan Ross (1957–2026), Estonian musicologist and psychologist
- Jaan Ruus (1938–2017), Estonian film critic, journalist and film editor
- Jaan Sarv (1877–1954), Estonian mathematician and pedagogue
- Jaan Soots (1880–1942), Estonian military commander
- Jaan Tallinn (born 1972), Estonian programmer
- Jaan Talts (born 1944), Estonian weightlifter
- Jaan Tätte (born 1964), Estonian playwright, poet, actor, and singer
- Jaan Teemant (1872–1941?), Estonian lawyer and politician
- Jaan Tiidemann (born 1971), Estonian architect
- Jaan Tõnisson (1868–1941?), Estonian statesman
- Jaan Toomik (born 1961), Estonian video artist and a painter
- Jaan Tooming (1946–2024), Estonian actor, stage and film director and writer
- Jaan Treumann (1881–1941), Estonian Lutheran clergyman, educator and politician
- Jaan Truusmann (1866–1932), Estonian teacher, farmer, and public figure
- Jaan Tults (1946–2026), Estonian rower and rowing coach
- Jaan-Eik Tulve (born 1967), Estonian conductor, Gregorian chant specialist and music educator
- Jaan Usin (1887–1941), Estonian Navy commander
- Jaan Vahtra (1882–1947), Estonian modernist artist, printmaker, writer and educator
- Jaan Vain (1886–1942), Estonian lawyer and politician
- Jaan Valsiner (born 1951), Estonian-American psychologist

Fictional characters

- Jaan Tatikas, protagonist in the Eduard Bornhöhe's novel Tallinna narrid ja narrikesed, who has become a well-known stereotype in Estonian culture

== See also ==
- Jaana, given name
- Jaani (disambiguation)
- Jaanus, given name
