= Harry Koch =

Harry Koch may refer to:

- Harry Koch (businessman) (1867–1942), Dutch-born American businessman
- Harry Koch (German footballer) (born 1969), German footballer and coach
- Harry Koch (Swiss footballer) (1930-2012), Swiss footballer
- Harry Eduard Ottokar Koch, Estonian politician

== See also ==
- Harold M. Koch (born 1932), Roman Catholic priest from Chicago
