= Nikolai Reek =

Estonian military commander

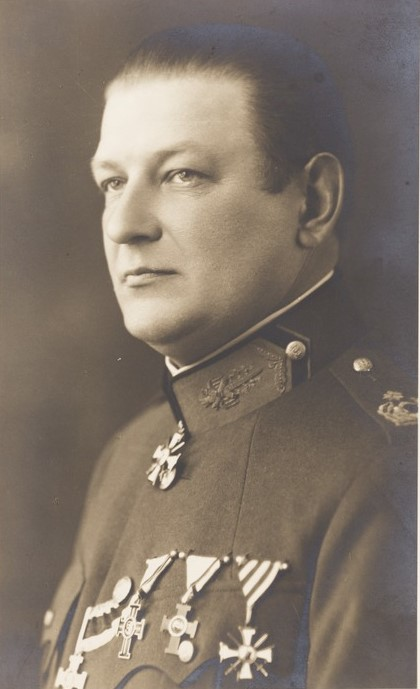
- Born: 1 February 1890; Tallinn, Kreis Harrien, Governorate of Estonia, Russian Empire
- Died: 8 May 1942 (aged 52); Ussollag, Perm Oblast, Soviet Union
- Military career
- Allegiance: Estonia
- Branch: Estonian Army
- Service years: 1907–1917 Russian Imperial Army; 1918–1940 Estonian Army
- Rank: Lieutenant general
- Conflicts: World War I; Estonian War of Independence; Battle of Wenden
- Awards: Cross of Liberty (Estonia); Order of Lāčplēsis; Order of the White Star
- Other work: Minister of War

Nikolai Reek VR I/2, VR II/2, VR II/3 (born Nikolai Bazykov; 1 February [O.S. 20 January] 1890 in Tallinn, Governorate of Estonia – 8 May 1942 Ussollag, Perm Oblast, Soviet Union) was the Estonian military commander during the Estonian War of Independence.

In 1910, he graduated from Chuguyev Military Academy. He participated in World War I, in 1917 graduated Imperial Nicholas Military Academy. Reek joined Estonian units in 1917 and was Chief of Staff until dissolution of these units. After that he organized the Defence League in Virumaa. In Estonian Liberation War Reek was firstly commander of 5th regiment at Viru Front, in January 1919 he became Chief of Staff of 1st Division, in April he became Chief of Staff of 3rd Division. Reek played important role in winning war against Baltische Landeswehr. In September 1919 he achieved the rank of colonel and served as Chief of Staff of Viru Front. After war Reek repeatedly served in positions of Chief of Staff, Minister of Defense and Commander of 2nd Division. In 1938 Reek was promoted to lieutenant general. In 1939 he was named defense minister in Jüri Uluots's cabinet. In 1941 Soviet occupation authorities arrested Reek, imprisoned him in Usollag, and executed him the following year.

Reek is recipient of the Latvian military Order of Lāčplēsis, 2nd class.

== See also ==
- Estonian War of Independence
- Freikorps in the Baltic

Political offices
Preceded by Jaan Soots	Minister of War; 1927 - 1928	Succeeded by Mihkel Juhkam
Preceded by Paul Lill	Minister of War; 1939 - 1940	Succeeded by Soviet occupation
