= Taarikõnnu Nature Reserve =

Protected area in Estonia

- Location within Estonia
- Location: Estonia
- Coordinates: 58°42′N 24°53′E
- Area: 2,835 ha (7,010 acres)
- Established: 2001 (2018)

Taarikõnnu Nature Reserve is a nature reserve which is located in Rapla County, Estonia.

The area of the nature reserve is 2835 ha.

The protected area was founded in 2001 to protect valuable habitat types and threatened species in Kõnnu and Viluvere village (Põhja-Pärnumaa Parish) and Ellamaa and Reonda village (Kehtna Parish).
