= One-party state =

State where only one party may form a government

A one-party state, single-party state, one-party system or single-party system is a governance structure in which only a single political party controls the ruling system. In the one-party state, all opposition parties are either outlawed or have limited and controlled participation in elections. The expression "de facto one-party" is sometimes used to describe a dominant-party system that, unlike a one-party state, allows (at least nominally) multiparty elections, but the existing practices or balance of political power effectively prevent the opposition from winning power.

Membership in the ruling party tends to be relatively small compared to the population; however, this is not a universal rule, as some one-party states, such as Zaire under Mobutu, made the entire citizenry members of the party. Rather, they give out private goods to fellow elites to ensure continued support. One-party, compared to dominant-party dictatorships, structure themselves unlike democracies. They also turn into multi-party democracies at a lower rate than dominant-party dictatorships. While one-party states prohibit opposition parties, some allow for independent candidates to stand for election in competition with party candidates. Therefore, they place elites and sympathetic candidates in key administrative races. For example, the Chinese Communist Party exercises political control by infiltrating village administrations. They view these positions as crucial for gathering information on the population and maintaining a presence in the far reaches of their borders.

One-party states recognize the trade-off between election victory and gathering valuable data. To account for this, the governments have been observed placing local nobility in easy-to-win races. One-party states have also been observed using elections to ensure that only the most popular elites get chosen to office. They also gather data from elections to indicate if a local official is performing poorly in the eyes of the residents. This gives locals the opportunity to monitor local officials and communicate satisfaction with the local government. Throughout the country, members of the one party hold key political positions. In doing so, the party avoids committing outright fraud and rather sustains their power at the local level with strategic appointment of elites. Data on one-party governments can be difficult to gather given their lack of transparency.

== Official one-party states ==
The following countries are legally constituted as one-party states:

| Country | Head of party | Leader title | Party | Ideology | Date of establishment | Duration | Constitutional basis | Notes |
|---|---|---|---|---|---|---|---|---|
| China | Xi Jinping | General Secretary | Chinese Communist Party | Socialism with Chinese characteristics Marxism-Leninism | 1 October 1949 | 77 years, 41 days | Article 1 of the Constitution: "Leadership by the Communist Party of China is the defining feature of socialism with Chinese characteristics." | Eight minor non-oppositional parties, officially termed "democratic parties," have legal status as part of the "united front" system, but their leadership is determined by the Chinese Communist Party's United Front Work Department. |
| Cuba | Miguel Díaz-Canel | First Secretary | Communist Party of Cuba | Marxism–Leninism-Castroism-Guevarism; Left-wing nationalism | 3 October 1965 | 61 years, 39 days | Article 5 of the Constitution: "The Communist Party of Cuba, unique, Martiano, Fidelista, and Marxist-Leninist, the organized vanguard of the Cuban nation, sustained in its democratic character as well as its permanent linkage to the people, is the superior driving force of the society and the State." | |
| Eritrea | Isaias Afwerki | Chairperson | People's Front for Democracy and Justice | Eritrean nationalism Statism; Left-wing nationalism | 16 February 1994 | 32 years, 268 days | The People's Front for Democracy and Justice is the only party in Eritrea. The 1997 Constitution has not been enforced. | |
| Laos | Thongloun Sisoulith | General Secretary | Lao People's Revolutionary Party | Kaysone Phomvihane Thought; Marxism-Leninism | 2 December 1975 | 50 years, 344 days | Article 3 of the Constitution: "The rights of the multi-ethnic people to be the masters of the country are exercised and ensured through the functioning of the political system with the Lao People's Revolutionary Party as its leading nucleus." | |
| North Korea | Kim Jong Un | General Secretary | Workers' Party of Korea | Kimilsungism–Kimjongilism; Juche; Communism | 9 September 1948 | 78 years, 63 days | Article 11 of the Constitution: "The Democratic People's Republic of Korea shall conduct all activities under the leadership of the Workers' Party of Korea." | Two minor parties are legally recognised, but are under the control of the Workers' Party of Korea |
| Sahrawi Arab Democratic Republic | Brahim Ghali | Secretary General | Polisario Front | Sahrawi nationalism Arab socialism | 27 February 1976 | 50 years, 257 days | Article 32 of the Constitution: "Until the complete recovery of national sovereignty, the Frente POLISARIO shall be the political framework that shall unite and mobilise politically the Sahrawis to express their aspirations and legitimate rights to self-determination and independence and to defend their national unity and complete the building of their independent Sahrawi State." | State with limited recognition, headquartered in Algeria |
| Vietnam | Tô Lâm | General Secretary | Communist Party of Vietnam | Ho Chi Minh Thought; Marxism-Leninism | 2 September 1945 (Note: Previously known as the Democratic Republic of Vietnam from 2 September 1945 to 25 April 1976. Reunified with the Republic of South Vietnam on 2 July 1976.) | 81 years, 70 days | Article 4 of the Constitution: " Communist Party of Vietnam - the Vanguard of the working class, concurrently the vanguard of the labouring people and Vietnamese nation, faithfully representing the interests of the working class, labouring people and entire nation, and acting upon the Marxist-Leninist doctrine and Ho Chi Minh Thought, is the force leading the State and society." | Two minor parties, the Democratic Party of Vietnam and Socialist Party of Vietnam, had legal status within the Vietnam Fatherland Front until 1988. |

== Former one-party states ==
| Country | Party | Ideology | Date of establishment | Date of dissolution | Duration | Continent |
|---|---|---|---|---|---|---|
| Republic of Afghanistan | National Revolutionary Party | Pashtun nationalism Pashtunization; Republicanism; Secularism | 14 February 1977 | 28 April 1978 | 4 years, 73 days | Asia |
| Democratic Republic of Afghanistan | People's Democratic Party of Afghanistan-Khalq | Communism; Marxism–Leninism; Stalinism; Pashtun nationalism Anti-imperialism | 30 April 1978 | 24 December 1979 | 1 year, 238 days | Asia |
| Democratic Republic of Afghanistan/Republic of Afghanistan | People's Democratic Party of Afghanistan-Parcham (National Fatherland Front) | Communism (until 1990); Marxism–Leninism (until 1990); Afghan nationalism Anti-imperialism | 24 December 1979 | 28 July 1992 | 12 years, 217 days | Asia |
| Albanian Kingdom | Albanian Fascist Party | Albanian nationalism Greater Albania; Fascism; Italophilia; Serbophobia; Hellenophobia | 2 June 1939 | 27 July 1943 | 4 years, 55 days | Europe |
| Albanian Kingdom | Guard of Greater Albania | Albanian nationalism Fascism | 27 July 1943 | 8 September 1943 | 43 days | Europe |
| Albanian Kingdom | National Front | Albanian nationalism Greater Albania; Anti-communism; Republicanism; Big tent Agrarian socialism | 14 September 1943 | 29 November 1943 | 76 days | Europe |
| Democratic Government of Albania | Party of Labour of Albania (National Liberation Movement) | Communism; Marxism–Leninism; Hoxhaism; Anti-revisionism; Albanian nationalism State atheism | 20 October 1944 | 5 August 1945 | 289 days | Europe |
| Democratic Government of Albania | Party of Labour of Albania (Democratic Front) | Communism; Marxism–Leninism; Hoxhaism; Anti-revisionism; Albanian nationalism State atheism | 5 August 1945 | 11 January 1946 | 159 days | Europe |
| Albania | Party of Labour of Albania (Democratic Front) | Communism; Marxism–Leninism; Hoxhaism; Anti-revisionism; Albanian nationalism State atheism | 11 January 1946 | 11 December 1990 | 44 years, 334 days | Europe |
| Algeria | National Liberation Front | Arab socialism Algerian nationalism Pan-Arabism; Anti-imperialism | 3 July 1962 | 23 February 1989 | 26 years, 235 days | Africa |
| People's Republic of Angola | People's Movement for the Liberation of Angola | Communism; Left-wing nationalism Marxism–Leninism | 11 November 1975 | 30 May 1991 | 15 years, 200 days | Africa |
| Armenia | Communist Party of Armenia | Communism; Marxism–Leninism; Democratic centralism State socialism | 2 December 1920 | 30 December 1922 | 2 years, 28 days | Asia |
| Transcaucasia | Communist Party of Armenia | Communism; Marxism–Leninism; Democratic centralism State socialism | 12 March 1922 | 30 December 1922 | 293 days | Asia |
| Federal State of Austria | Fatherland Front | Clerical fascism | 1 May 1934 | 13 March 1938 | 3 years, 316 days | Europe |
| Azerbaijan | Azerbaijan Communist Party | Communism; Marxism–Leninism; Democratic centralism State socialism | 28 April 1920 | 30 December 1922 | 2 years, 246 days | Asia |
| Transcaucasia | Azerbaijan Communist Party | Communism; Marxism–Leninism; Democratic centralism State socialism | 12 March 1922 | 30 December 1922 | 293 days | Asia |
| Bangladesh | Bangladesh Krishak Sramik Awami League | Mujibism; Bengali nationalism | 24 January 1975 | 15 August 1975 | 203 days | Asia |
| Bangladesh | Jatiya Party | Bangladeshi nationalism Conservatism; Authoritarianism; Militarism | 11 March 1988 | 6 December 1990 | 2 years, 270 days | Asia |
| Dahomey | Dahomeyan Democratic Party | African nationalism | 15 December 1963 | 4 December 1965 | 1 year, 354 days | Africa |
| Benin | People's Revolutionary Party of Benin | Communism; Marxism–Leninism (nominally) | 30 November 1975 | 1 March 1990 | 14 years, 91 days | Africa |
| Protectorate of Bohemia and Moravia | National Partnership | Collaborationism, Nazism | 6 April 1939 | 9 May 1945 | 6 years, 33 days | Europe |
| Bulgaria | Bulgarian Communist Party (Fatherland Front) | Communism; Marxism–Leninism; Democratic centralism State socialism | 15 September 1946 | 15 January 1990 | 43 years, 122 days | Europe |
| State of Burma | Dobama Sinyetha Asi Ayon | | 1943 | 1944 | 1 year, 0 days | Asia |
| State of Burma | Maha Bama Asi Ayon | | 1944 | 1945 | 1 year, 0 days | Asia |
| (Myanmar) Burma | Burma Socialist Programme Party | Burmese Way to Socialism | 2 March 1962 | 18 September 1988 | 26 years, 200 days | Asia |
| Republic of Burundi | Union for National Progress | Burundian nationalism Tutsi interests | 11 July 1974 | 13 March 1992 | 17 years, 246 days | Africa |
| Byelorussia | Communist Party of Byelorussia | Communism; Marxism–Leninism; Democratic centralism State socialism | 31 July 1920 | 30 December 1922 | 2 years, 152 days | Europe |
| Cambodia (Sangkum era) | Sangkum | Khmer nationalism National conservatism Royalism; Statism; Buddhist socialism Economic nationalism | 22 March 1955 | 18 March 1970 | 14 years, 361 days | Asia |
| Kampuchea | Kampuchean People's Revolutionary Party | Communism; Socialism; Marxism–Leninism; Revisionism; Left-wing nationalism | 7 January 1979 | 1 May 1989 | 10 years, 114 days | Asia |
| Republic of Cameroon | Cameroonian National Union | Big tent | 1 September 1966 | 24 March 1985 | 18 years, 204 days | Africa |
| Cameroon | Cameroon People's Democratic Movement | Big tent Nationalism; Francophilia | 1975 | 1990 | 15 years, 0 days | Africa |
| Cape Verde | African Party for the Independence of Guinea and Cape Verde | Communism; Marxism–Leninism | 1 July 1975 | 20 January 1981 | 5 years, 203 days | Africa |
| Cape Verde | African Party for the Independence of Cape Verde | Communism; Marxism–Leninism | 20 January 1981 | 28 September 1990 | 9 years, 251 days | Africa |
| Carpatho-Ukraine | Ukrainian National Union | Nationalism | 18 January 1939 | March 1939 | 60 days | Europe |
| Central African Republic | Movement for the Social Evolution of Black Africa | African nationalism Anti-colonialism; Progressivism; Anti-imperialism | 1962 | 1980 | 18 years, 0 days | Africa |
| Central African Republic | Central African Democratic Union | African nationalism Republicanism | 1 March 1980 | 2 September 1981 | 1 year, 185 days | Africa |
| Central African Republic | Central African Democratic Rally | African nationalism Democratic socialism Social democracy Republicanism | 6 February 1987 | 22 April 1991 | 4 years, 75 days | Africa |
| Chad | Chadian Progressive Party | African nationalism Pan-Africanism; Anti-imperialism; African socialism Federalism | 16 April 1962 | 6 April 1973 | 10 years, 355 days | Africa |
| Chad | National Movement for the Cultural and Social Revolution | African nationalism Pan-Africanism; Anti-imperialism; African socialism Federalism | 6 April 1973 | 13 April 1975 | 2 years, 7 days | Africa |
| Chad | National Union for Independence and Revolution | Nationalism | 24 June 1984 | 3 December 1990 | 6 years, 162 days | Africa |
| Guangzhou | Chinese Communist Party | Marxism–Leninism; Mao Zedong Thought; Chinese communism | 1927 | 1927 | | Asia |
| Hunan | Chinese Communist Party | Marxism–Leninism; Mao Zedong Thought; Chinese communism | 1927 | 1927 | | Asia |
| Jinggang | Chinese Communist Party | Marxism–Leninism; Mao Zedong Thought; Chinese communism | 1927 | 1928 | 1 year, 0 days | Asia |
| Southwest Jiangxi | Chinese Communist Party | Marxism–Leninism; Mao Zedong Thought; Chinese communism | 1930 | 1931 | 1 year, 0 days | Asia |
| Chinese Soviet Republic | Chinese Communist Party | Marxism–Leninism; Mao Zedong Thought; Chinese communism | 7 November 1931 | 22 September 1937 | 5 years, 319 days | Asia |
| Xinjiang | People's Anti-Imperialist Association | Six Great Policies | 1 August 1935 | 1 April 1942 | 6 years, 243 days | Asia |
| Republic of China (Note: The Republic of China controlled the mainland from 1912 to 1949 and the island of Taiwan since 1945, in which the ROC currently administers the Free area. This government served China in the United Nations from 1945 to 1971. See Political status of Taiwan and the One-China policy for various viewpoints.)/Taiwan | Kuomintang | Tridemism | 1 July 1925 | 1 May 1991 | 62 years, 14 days | Asia |
| Yan'an | Chinese Communist Party | Marxism–Leninism; Mao Zedong Thought; Chinese communism | 1937 | 1949 | 12 years, 0 days | Asia |
| Comoros | Comorian Union for Progress | Nationalism | 1982 | 1990 | 8 years, 0 days | Africa |
| Republic of the Congo | National Movement of the Revolution | Scientific Socialism | 20 July 1964 | 29 December 1969 | 5 years, 162 days | Africa |
| People's Republic of the Congo | Congolese Party of Labour | Communism, Marxism–Leninism | 31 January 1969 | 18 March 1992 | 23 years, 47 days | Africa |
| Tinoquista Costa Rica | Peliquista Party | Nationalism; Personalism; Authoritarianism | 27 January 1917 | 12 August 1919 | 2 years, 197 days | North America |
| (Czechoslovak Socialist Republic) Czechoslovakia | Communist Party of Czechoslovakia (National Front) | Marxism–Leninism; Democratic centralism State socialism Husakism | 25 February 1948 | 30 November 1989 | 41 years, 278 days | Europe |
| Dahomey | Dahomeyan Unity Party | African nationalism Republicanism | 11 April 1961 | 13 November 1963 | 2 years, 216 days | Africa |
| Danzig | Nazi Party | Nazism | 21 October 1937 | 1 September 1939 | 1 year, 315 days | Europe |
| Djibouti | People's Rally for Progress | Issa interests | 1 October 1981 | 4 September 1992 | 10 years, 339 days | Africa |
| Dominican Republic | Dominican Party | Trujillism; National conservatism Right-wing populism Antihaitianismo | 2 August 1931 | 28 December 1961 | 30 years, 148 days | North America |
| East Germany | Socialist Unity Party of Germany (National Front) | Marxism–Leninism; Democratic centralism State socialism Stalinism | 7 October 1949 | 1 December 1989 | 40 years, 55 days | Europe |
| Egypt | Liberation Rally | Egyptian nationalism Pan-Arabism; Socialism | 10 February 1953 | 1957 | 4 years, 0 days | Africa |
| Egypt | National Union | Nasserism; Pan-Arabism; Socialism | 1957 | 1962 | 5 years, 0 days | Africa |
| Egypt | Arab Socialist Union | Arab nationalism Arab socialism Pan-Arabism; Nasserism | 1961 | 1976 | 15 years, 0 days | Africa |
| El Salvador | National Pro Patria Party | Fascism; Anti-communism; Conservatism; Agrarian oligarchy | 1933 | 1944 | 11 years, 0 days | Central America |
| Equatorial Guinea | United National Workers' Party | African nationalism Personalism; Anti-imperialism; Anti-colonialism; Anti-racism; Pan-Africanism; Anti-intellectualism; Totalitarianism | 7 July 1970 | 25 August 1979 | 9 years, 49 days | Africa |
| Equatorial Guinea | Democratic Party of Equatorial Guinea | African nationalism Militarism | 11 October 1987 | 16 November 1991 | 4 years, 36 days | Africa |
| Eritrea | Eritrean People's Liberation Front | Left-wing nationalism | 1991 (Provisional government) 1993 (Recognized state) | 16 February 1994 | 3 years, 0 days | Africa |
| Estonia | Russian Communist Party (Central Committee of the Estonian Sections) | Communism; Marxism–Leninism; Democratic centralism State socialism | 29 November 1918 | 5 June 1919 | 188 days | Europe |
| Estonia | Patriotic League (National Front for the Implementation of the Constitution) | Estonian nationalism Personalism | 9 March 1935 | 21 July 1940 | 5 years, 134 days | Europe |
| Estonia | Communist Party of Estonia | Communism; Marxism–Leninism; Democratic centralism State socialism | 21 July 1940 | 9 August 1940 | 19 days | Europe |
| Ethiopia | Commission for Organizing the Party of the Working People of Ethiopia | Communism; Marxism–Leninism | 12 September 1984 | 22 February 1987 | 2 years, 163 days | Africa |
| Ethiopia | Workers' Party of Ethiopia | Communism; Marxism–Leninism | 22 February 1987 | 28 April 1991 | 4 years, 65 days | Africa |
| Gabon | Gabonese Democratic Party | Conservatism | 12 March 1968 | 22 May 1990 | 22 years, 71 days | Africa |
| Georgia | Communist Party of Georgia | Communism; Marxism–Leninism; Democratic centralism State socialism | 25 February 1921 | 30 December 1922 | 1 year, 308 days | Asia |
| Transcaucasia | Communist Party of Georgia | Communism; Marxism–Leninism; Democratic centralism State socialism | 12 March 1922 | 30 December 1922 | 293 days | Asia |
| Nazi Germany | National Socialist German Workers' Party | Nazism | 14 July 1933 | 23 May 1945 | 11 years, 313 days | Europe |
| Reich Commissariat for the Occupied Dutch Territories | National Socialist Movement in the Netherlands | Collaborationism, Dutch irredentism, Dutch nationalism and Nazism | 14 December 1941 | 6 May 1945 | 3 years, 143 days | Europe |
| Ghana | Convention People's Party | Nkrumaism; African socialism African nationalism Pan-Africanism | 31 January 1964 | 24 February 1966 | 2 years, 24 days | Africa |
| Grenada | New JEWEL Movement | Communism; Marxism–Leninism | 13 March 1979 | 25 October 1983 | 4 years, 226 days | North America |
| Guatemala | Progressive Liberal Party | Ubicoism; Liberalism; Nationalism; Anti-communism | 1931 | 1944 | | Central America |
| Guatemala | National Liberation Movement | Neo-fascism; Ultraconservatism; Anti-communism | 1954 | 1958 | | Central America |
| Guinea | Democratic Party of Guinea – African Democratic Rally | African nationalism African socialism Pan-Africanism | 1960 | 1984 | | Africa |
| Guinea-Bissau | African Party for the Independence of Guinea and Cape Verde | Communism; Marxism–Leninism | 1974 | 1991 | | Africa |
| Haiti | National Unity Party | Black nationalism Haitian nationalism Right-wing populism Anti-communism; Anti-Americanism | 14 June 1957 | 22 July 1985 | 28 years, 38 days | North America |
| Hawaii | Reform Party | Americanisation; Annexationism | 4 July 1894 | 12 August 1898 | 4 years, 39 days | North America |
| Government of National Unity | Arrow Cross Party | Magyarism; Fascism; Collaborationism; Agrarianism | 16 October 1944 | 7 May 1945 | 203 days | Europe |
| Hungary | Hungarian Working People's Party | Communism; Marxism–Leninism; Stalinism | 20 August 1949 | 31 October 1956 | 7 years, 72 days | Europe |
| Hungary | Hungarian Socialist Workers' Party | Communism; Marxism–Leninism; Kádárism | 4 November 1956 | 16 October 1989 | 32 years, 350 days | Europe |
| Indonesia | Indonesian National Party | Nationalism; Marhaenism | 17 August 1945 | 3 November 1945 | 78 days | Asia |
| Imperial State of Iran | Rastakhiz Party | Monarchism; Populism; Secularism; Democratic centralism Third Position | 2 March 1975 | 1 November 1978 | 3 years, 244 days | Asia |
| Iraq | Iraqi Arab Socialist Union | Arab nationalism Arab socialism Pan-Arabism; Nasserism | 14 July 1964 | 17 July 1968 | 4 years, 3 days | Asia |
| Iraq | Arab Socialist Ba'ath Party | Saddamist Ba'athism; Arab nationalism Arab socialism Pan-Arabism; Militarism | 17 July 1968 | 9 April 2003 | 34 years, 266 days | Asia |
| Fascist Italy | National Fascist Party | Fascism; Corporatism; Ultranationalism; Totalitarianism | 17 May 1928 | 27 July 1943 | 15 years, 71 days | Europe/Africa |
| Italian Social Republic | Republican Fascist Party | Fascism; Corporatism; Ultranationalism; Totalitarianism; Antisemitism; Collaborationism | 13 September 1943 | 14 February 1945 | 1 year, 154 days | Europe |
| Ivory Coast | Democratic Party of Ivory Coast – African Democratic Rally | African nationalism Conservatism; Populism; Houphouëtism; Pan-Africanism | 1960 | 1990 | | Africa |
| Empire of Japan | Imperial Rule Assistance Association | Shōwa statism Militarism | 1940 | 1945 | | Asia |
| Philippine Executive Commission | Association for Service to the New Philippines | Filipino nationalism National conservatism Fascism; Japanophilia; Collaborationism | 8 December 1942 | 14 October 1943 | 310 days | Asia |
| Kampuchea | Communist Party of Kampuchea | Communism; Marxism–Leninism; Agrarianism; Autarky; Khmer nationalism Ultranationalism | 17 April 1975 | 7 January 1979 | 2 years, 265 days | Asia |
| Kenya | Kenya African National Union | Kenyan nationalism Conservatism | 1969 (de facto); 1982 (de jure) | 1991 | | Africa |
| First Republic of Korea | Liberal Party | Ilminism; Conservatism; Korean nationalism | 17 December 1951 | 19 April 1960 | 8 years, 124 days | Asia |
| Third Republic of Korea | Democratic Republican Party | Korean nationalism Conservatism; Corporatism | 2 February 1963 | 12 December 1979 | 16 years, 313 days | Asia |
| Fifth Republic of Korea | Democratic Justice Party | Conservatism; Authoritarianism | 15 January 1981 | 16 December 1987 | 6 years, 335 days | Asia |
| Independent State of Croatia | Ustaša – Croatian Revolutionary Movement | Croatian irredentism Croatian ultranationalism National conservatism Social conservatism Clerical fascism Fascist corporatism Political Catholicism; Anti-communism | 10 April 1941 | 8 May 1945 | 4 years, 28 days | Europe |
| Latvia | Communist Party of Latvia | Communism; Marxism–Leninism; Democratic centralism State socialism | 17 December 1918 | 13 January 1920 | 1 year, 27 days | Europe |
| Latvia | Communist Party of Latvia | Communism; Marxism–Leninism; Democratic centralism State socialism | 21 July 1940 | 5 August 1940 | 15 days | Europe |
| Liberia | True Whig Party | Black conservatism Centralization; Protectionism; Whiggism (until 1940s) | 1878 | April 1980 | | Africa |
| Libya | Arab Socialist Union | Arab nationalism Arab socialism Pan-Arabism; Nasserism | 11 June 1971 | 3 March 1977 | 5 years, 265 days | Africa |
| Lithuania–Byelorussia | Communist Party of Lithuania and Byelorussia | Communism; Marxism–Leninism; Democratic centralism State socialism | 17 February 1919 | 17 July 1919 | 150 days | Europe |
| Lithuania | Lithuanian Nationalist Union | Lithuanian nationalism National conservatism Social conservatism Fascist corporatism Anti-communism | 1926 | 1940 | 14 years | Europe |
| Lithuania | Communist Party of Lithuania | Communism; Marxism–Leninism; Democratic centralism State socialism | 21 July 1940 | 3 August 1940 | 13 days | Europe |
| Democratic Republic of Madagascar | National Front for the Defense of the Revolution | Left-wing nationalism Scientific socialism | 1976 | 1989 | | Africa |
| Malawi | Malawi Congress Party | Ubuntu; Conservatism; African nationalism Anti-colonialism | 1964 | 1993 | | Africa |
| Mali | Sudanese Union – African Democratic Rally | African nationalism Pan-Africanism; African socialism | 1960 | 1968 | | Africa |
| Mali | Democratic Union of the Malian People | African socialism Democratic centralism | 1976 | 1991 | | Africa |
| Manchukuo | Concordia Association | Fascism; Monarchism; Manchurian nationalism Pan-Asianism | 1 April 1932 | 1 May 1945 | 13 years, 30 days | Asia |
| Mauritania | Mauritanian People's Party | Nationalism; Centralism; Islamic socialism | 1961 | 1978 | | Africa |
| Mongolia | Mongolian People's Revolutionary Party | Communism; Marxism–Leninism | 1921 | 29 July 1990 | | Asia |
| Mozambique | FRELIMO | Marxism–Leninism | 25 June 1975 | 1 December 1990 | 15 years, 159 days | Africa |
| Niger | Nigerien Progressive Party – African Democratic Rally | African nationalism Pan-Africanism | 1960 | 1974 | | Africa |
| Niger | National Movement for the Development of Society | Conservatism | 1989 | 1991 | | Africa |
| Vietnam (partially) | Workers' Party of North Vietnam (League for the Independence of Vietnam) | Communism; Marxism–Leninism; Ho Chi Minh Thought | 2 September 1945 | 1946 | | Asia |
| North Vietnam | Workers' Party of North Vietnam (Vietnamese Fatherland Front) | Communism; Marxism–Leninism; Ho Chi Minh Thought | 1955 | 2 July 1976 | | Asia |
| North Yemen | General People's Congress | Yemeni nationalism Arab nationalism Pan-Arabism; Big tent | 1982 | 1988 | | Asia |
| (Norway) National Government | National Rally | Fascism; Nazism; Fascist corporatism Anti-communism; Collaborationism | 25 September 1940 | 8 May 1945 | 4 years, 225 days | Europe |
| Ottoman Empire | Union and Progress Party | İttihadism | 11 June 1913 | 1918 | | Asia/Europe |
| Paraguay | Colorado Party | Conservatism; National conservatism | 1947 | 1962 | | South America |
| Persia | Communist Party of Persia | Communism; Marxism–Leninism | 1920 | 1921 | | Asia |
| Republic of the Philippines | Association for Service to the New Philippines | Filipino nationalism, National conservatism, Fascism, Japanophilia, collaborationism | 14 October 1943 | 17 August 1945 | 1 year, 307 days | Asia |
| Poland | Polish United Workers' Party (Front of National Unity) | Marxism–Leninism; Democratic centralism State socialism | 5 February 1947 | 20 July 1982 | 35 years, 165 days | Europe |
| Poland | Polish United Workers' Party (Patriotic Movement for National Rebirth) | Marxism–Leninism; Democratic centralism State socialism | 20 July 1982 | 7 April 1989 | 6 years, 261 days | Europe |
| Portugal | National Union | Salazarism; Corporatism; Integralismo Lusitano | 30 July 1930 | 8 October 1945 | 15 years, 70 days | Europe |
| Portugal | National Union | Salazarism; Corporatism; Integralismo Lusitano | 31 January 1948 | September 1969 (Note: Following the appointment of Marcelo Caetano as Prime Minister in 1968, the opposition was allowed to run to the 1969 Portuguese legislative election, before being banned.) | | Europe |
| Portugal | People's National Action (formerly National Union) | Corporatism; Integralismo Lusitano | 1970 | 25 April 1974 | | Europe |
| Romania | National Renaissance Front | Big tent Romanian nationalism Monarchism | 16 December 1938 | 6 September 1940 | 1 year, 265 days | Europe |
| (Romania) National Legionary State | Iron Guard | Legionarism; Clerical fascism Christian nationalism | 6 September 1940 | 23 January 1941 | 139 days | Europe |
| Romania | Romanian Communist Party (People's Democratic Front) | Communism; Marxism–Leninism | 5 February 1948 | 1968 | | Europe |
| Romania | Romanian Communist Party (Front of Socialist Unity) | Communism; Marxism–Leninism; National Communism | 1968 | 1980 | | Europe |
| Romania | Romanian Communist Party (Front of Socialist Unity and Democracy) | Communism; Marxism–Leninism; National Communism | 1980 | 29 December 1989 | | Europe |
| Rwanda | Parmehutu | Hutu Power | 1965 | 1973 | | Africa |
| Rwanda | National Revolutionary Movement for Development | Hutu Power; Ultranationalism; Social conservatism Anti-communism | 1978 | 1991 | | Africa |
| South Africa | Nasionale Party | apartheid | 1948 | 1994 | | Africa |
| San Marino | Sammarinese Fascist Party | Italian fascism Corporatism | 1926 | 1943 | | Europe |
| San Marino | Republican Fascist Party of San Marino | Italian fascism | 1943 | 1944 | | Europe |
| Senegal | Socialist Party of Senegal | African nationalism African socialism | 1966 | 1974 | | Africa |
| Seychelles | Seychelles People's Progressive Front | Communism; Marxism-Leninism | 1979 | 1991 | | Africa |
| Sierra Leone | All People's Congress | African nationalism Democratic socialism | 1978 | 1991 | | Africa |
| Slovak Republic | Hlinka's Slovak People's Party – Party of Slovak National Unity | Clerical fascism Slovak nationalism | 14 March 1939 | 8 May 1945 | 6 years, 55 days | Europe |
| Somalia | Somali Revolutionary Socialist Party | Islamic socialism Marxism–Leninism; Pan-Somalism; Scientific socialism Somali nationalism | July 1976 | 26 January 1991 | | Africa |
| People's Republic of Southern Yemen | National Liberation Front, Yemeni Socialist Party | Arab nationalism Arab socialism | 30 November 1967 | 31 October 1978 | 10 years, 335 days | Asia |
| People's Democratic Republic of Yemen | Yemeni Socialist Party | Communism; Marxism–Leninism | 31 October 1978 | 22 May 1990 | 11 years, 203 days | Asia |
| Democratic Republic of Yemen | Yemeni Socialist Party | Communism; Marxism–Leninism | 21 May 1994 | 7 July 1994 | 47 days | Asia |
| Russian Soviet Federative Socialist Republic | Russian Communist Party | Communism; Marxism–Leninism; Democratic centralism State socialism | 8 March 1918 | 30 December 1922 | 4 years, 297 days | Europe/Asia |
| Russian Soviet Federative Socialist Republic | Russian Social Democratic Labour Party | Communism; Marxism–Leninism; Democratic centralism State socialism | 19 January 1918 | 8 March 1918 | 48 days | Europe/Asia |
| Union of Soviet Socialist Republics | Russian Communist Party | Communism; Marxism–Leninism; Democratic centralism State socialism | 30 December 1922 | 31 December 1925 | 3 years, 1 day | Europe/Asia |
| Union of Soviet Socialist Republics | All-Union Communist Party | Communism; Marxism–Leninism; Democratic centralism State socialism | 31 December 1925 | 13 October 1952 | 26 years, 287 days | Europe/Asia |
| Union of Soviet Socialist Republics | Communist Party of the Soviet Union | Communism; Marxism–Leninism; Democratic centralism State socialism | 13 October 1952 | 9 October 1990; 6 November 1991 (de-facto) | 37 years, 361 days 39 years, 24 days (de-facto) | Europe/Asia |
| Kingdom of Spain | Patriotic Union | Spanish nationalism Political Catholicism; Monarchism; Conservatism | 1924 | 1930 | | Europe |
| Spanish State | FET y de las JONS | Francoism; Falangism; Spanish nationalism traditionalism National Catholicism anti-liberalism Corporatism | 1 April 1939 | 6 July 1976 | 37 years, 96 days | Europe |
| Democratic Republic of the Sudan | Sudanese Socialist Union | Arab nationalism Arab socialism Anti-communism | 1971 | 1985 | | Africa |
| Sudan | National Congress Party | Islamism; Arab nationalism Salafism; Social conservatism | 1989 | 2005 | | Africa |
| Syrian Republic | Arab Liberation Movement | Syrian nationalism Modernization; Pro-Western | 1953 | 1954 | | Asia |
| Syrian Arab Republic | Arab Socialist Ba'ath Party (National Progressive Front) | Neo-Ba'athism; Pan-Arabism; Arab nationalism Arab socialism Militarism | 8 March 1963 | 27 February 2012; 8 December 2024 (de-facto) (Note: While the 2012 constitution introduced by Bashar al-Assad theoretically enabled the establishment of political parties, Ba'athist Syria remained a de-facto one-party state with an extensive secret police apparatus that curtailed independent political activities.) | 48 years, 356 days 61 years, 275 days (de-facto) | Asia |
| São Tomé and Príncipe | Movement for the Liberation of São Tomé and Príncipe – Social Democratic Party | Communism; Marxism–Leninism | 1975 | 1990 | | Africa |
| Tanganyika | Tanganyika African National Union | African nationalism African socialism Ujamaa | 1961 | 1977 | | Africa |
| Tanzania | Chama Cha Mapinduzi | Ujamaa; African socialism | 1977 | 1992 | | Africa |
| Togo | Party of Togolese Unity | African nationalism | 1962 | 1963 | | Africa |
| Togo | Rally of the Togolese People | African nationalism Right-wing populism | 1969 | 1991 | | Africa |
| Tunisia | Neo Destour | Tunisian nationalism Bourguibism; Arab nationalism Secularism | 1963 | 1964 | | Africa |
| Tunisia | Socialist Destourian Party | Tunisian nationalism Secularism; Bourguibism | 1964 | 1981 | | Africa |
| Turkey (one-party period) | Republican People's Party | Kemalism | 1923 | 1945 | | Asia/Europe |
| Turkmenistan | Democratic Party of Turkmenistan | Turkmen nationalism Secularism; Social conservatism Catch-all party | 1992 | 2008 | | Asia |
| Tuva | Tuvan People's Revolutionary Party | Communism; Marxism–Leninism; Democratic centralism State socialism | 14 August 1921 | 11 October 1944 | 23 years, 58 days | Asia |
| Uganda | Uganda People's Congress | Social democracy African nationalism Pan-Africanism | 1969 | 1971 | | Africa |
| Ukraine | Communist Party of Ukraine | Communism; Marxism–Leninism; Democratic centralism State socialism | 10 March 1919 | 30 December 1922 | 3 years, 295 days | Europe |
| United Arab Republic | National Union | Arab nationalism Arab socialism Pan-Arabism | 1958 | 1961 | | Africa |
| (Republic of Upper Volta) Upper Volta | Voltaic Democratic Union-African Democratic Rally | African nationalism Pan-Africanism | 1960 | 1966 | | Africa |
| Yugoslavia | Yugoslav Radical Peasants' Democracy | Royalism; Yugoslav nationalism Agrarianism; Centralism; Anti-liberalism | 1929 | 1931 | | Europe |
| Yugoslavia | League of Communists of Yugoslavia (Socialist Alliance of Working People of Yugoslavia) | Marxism–Leninism; Titoism; Yugoslavism | 29 November 1945 | 22 January 1990 | 44 years, 54 days | Europe |
| Zaire | Popular Movement of the Revolution | Mobutism; Zairean nationalism Authenticité | 1970 | 1990 | | Africa |
| Zambia | United National Independence Party | African socialism African nationalism | 1972 | 1990 | | Africa |
| Zanzibar | Afro-Shirazi Party | African nationalism Marxism–Leninism | 1964 | 1977 | | Africa |

== See also ==
- Dominant-party system
- Ban on factions in the Communist Party of the Soviet Union
- Multi-party system
- Outline of democracy
- Political factionalism
- Political organisation
- Two-party system
- Uniparty
- Unitary parliamentary republic
- Landslide victory
