= Ruus =

Family name

Origin
- Language: Estonian
- Region of origin: Estonia

Ruus is an Estonian surname. As of 1 January 2021, 212 men and 246 women have the surname Ruus in Estonia. In terms of the distribution of surnames, Ruus ranks 265th for men and 245th for women. The surname is most commonly found in Hiiu County, where 7.36 per 10,000 inhabitants of the county bear the name.

Notable people bearing the surname Ruus include:

- Aarne Ruus (1909–1968), actor and theatre director
- Ago Ruus (born 1949), film cinematographer and director
- Erik Ruus (1962–2025), actor
- Jaan Ruus (1938–2017), journalist, film critic and editor
- Hando Ruus (1917–1945), soldier and artist
- Karl Robert Ruus (1899–1946), politician
- Neeme Ruus (1911–1942), politician, communist activist and Esperantist
- Raissa Ruus (1942–1986), middle-distance runner
- Tõnu Ruus (1940–2019), physicist
