= Kokk =

Kokk or KOKK may refer to:

- KOKK, a radio station licensed to serve Huron, South Dakota, USA
- KOKK, ICAO code for Kokomo Municipal Airport, Indiana, USA
- Kokk (surname), Estonian surname literally meaning "cook"
