= Avdy Andresson =

Estonian politician (1899–1990)

Minister of War
- In office 1973–1990
- Preceded by: Heinrich Mark
- Succeeded by: Jüri Toomepuu

Personal details
- Born: 15 November 1899 Viluvere, Livonia, Russian Empire
- Died: 27 August 1990 (aged 90) Deerfield, New Jersey, United States

Avdy Andresson (15 November 1899 in Viluvere, Estonia – 27 August 1990 in Deerfield, New Jersey, United States) was the Estonian Minister of War in exile from April 3, 1973, until two months before his death on June 20, 1990, and disputed Commander of Armed Forces (Estonian: Sõjavägede Juhataja) from 14 October 1975.

== Life ==
Born and raised in Estonia, which was then part of the Russian Empire, Andresson served in the Czarist Cavalry during World War I. During the Estonian War of Independence against Bolshevist Russia from 1918 until 1920 Andresson served in the 1st Cavalry Regiment of the Estonian Army and from 1920 to 1940 in the Cavalry Regiment and the Ministry of War's Horse Breeding Station as a non-commissioned officer and a veterinarian.

During the Soviet invasion and occupation of Estonia in 1940, during World War II, Andresson served in Wehrmacht Cavalry division from 1940 until 1945.

Following Germany's defeat Andresson fled to the United States of America with his second wife Hilda Andresson (née Vilms, the widow of Juhan Piirimaa). In 1960, he was elected president of the Union of Estonian Freedom Fighters (Estonian: Eesti Vabadusvõitlejate Liit). For years, he published a monthly Estonian Freedom Fighters bulletin called Virgats, and was instrumental in the construction of a granite monument in their honor on the grounds of the Lutheran Church in Northville, New Jersey. From 1973 until 1990, Andresson served as the Minister of War in Exile.

Andresson died in Deerfield, New Jersey, and was interred at the Northville Estonian Lutheran Cemetery in Cumberland County, New Jersey. His wife Hilda died in 1995 and was interred next to him.

== Acknowledgements ==
- Order of the Cross of the Eagle, Class III. 24 February 1938.
