= Johannes Kurvits =

Estonian politician

Johannes Kurvits (5 May 1894, in Kirepi Parish, Kreis Dorpat – 4 December 1941, in Turinsk, Sverdlovsk Oblast) was an Estonian politician. He was a member of VI Riigikogu (its National Council).
