= Kundla =

Kundla is a surname. Notable people with the surname include:

- Jaan Kundla (born 1937), Estonian politician
- John Kundla (1916–2017), American college and professional basketball coach
