= Richard Veermaa =

Estonian politician

Richard Veermaa (born Richard Vreeman; 26 May 1901 Lasva Parish, Võru County – 19 February 1942 Ussolye prison camp, Perm Oblast, Russia) was an Estonian police chief and politician. He was a member of III, IV and V Riigikogu.

Veermaa was a veteran of the Estonian War of Independence. He graduated from the University of Tartu. From 1935 until 1938, he was the 1938–1939 he was the director of the Police Administration. From 1938 until 1939, he was the Minister of Internal Affairs.

Following the Soviet occupation of Estonia in 1940 during World War II, Veermaa was arrested by the NKVD in Tallinn on 18 September 1940 and died at Usolye Corrective Labor Camp in the Russian Soviet Federative Socialist Republic.
