= Voolaid =

Voolaid is an Estonian surname. Notable people with the surname include:

- Julius Voolaid (1900–1966), Estonian politician and pastor
- Karel Voolaid (born 1977), Estonian football player and manager

== See also ==
- Vooglaid, surname
