= Nuut =

Family name

Origin
- Language: Estonian
- Meaning: "whip", "knot", "chickpea" (Cicer arietinum)
- Region of origin: Estonia

Nuut is an Estonian surname with several meanings in the Estonian language: "whip", "knot", and colloquially, "chickpea" (Cicer arietinum). The name, however, is most certainly derived from the Scandinavian masculine given name Knut, or Knud.

As of 1 January 2021, 158 men and 175 women in Estonia have the surname Nuut. Nuut is ranked as the 434th most common surname for men in Estonia, and 415th for women. The surname Nuut is most common in Saare County, where 15.48 per 10,000 inhabitants of the county bear the surname.

Notable people bearing the surname Nuut include:

- Ants Nuut (born 1950), trombonist (Apelsin)
- Arvo Nuut (1941–2021), cinematographer and film producer
- Jaan Nuut (1874–unknown) politician
- Jüri Nuut (1892–1952), politician
- Maarja Nuut (born 1986), singer and violinist
