= Usollag =

Gulag in Perm Krai, Russia

Usollag, full name: Usolye Corrective Labor Camp (Russian: Усольлаг, Усольский исправительно-трудовой лагерь (Усольский ИТЛ)) was a Gulag forced labor camp established on February 5, 1938 and functioned after the dissolution of Gulag, until 1960. It was headquartered in Solikamsk, now in Perm Krai, Russia, and it had numerous "lagpunkts" (individual camp locations) in the northern parts of the then Molotov Oblast. Its main occupation was logging and associated industries. Its reported peak occupancy was 37,000 inmates on January 1, 1942.

Its name is related to old name Usolye Kamskoye of Solikamsk and is not to be confused with ИТЛ Усольгидролес (Usolgidroles ITL) sometimes referred to as Usolye Corrective Labor Camp as well, but it was headquartered at the town of Usolye. Its name meaning:gidro-=hydro- standing for Stalingradgidrostroy + 'les' standing for "лесозаготовки", i.e., "logging", i.e. logging for Stalingrad hydropower plant construction works (now known as the Volga Hydroelectric Station).

A significant number of the residents of Usollag were the Labor army "worker columns" formed from the mobilized Volga Germans.

In 1941 the subcamp at the settlement of Surmog received a considerable number of inmates deported from the Baltic states incorporated into the Soviet Union.

Usollag administered several dozens of subcamps, called lagpunkts ("camp points"). Most of them housed about 100 inmates each doing logging. The only penal settlements of Sim and Surmog survived, which were converted into corrective labor colonies. Other settlements with disappeared subcamps of Usollag include Сом, Талая, Усть-Талка, Цыбин Родник; Шомыш, Цветково, Ржавец, Талица, Красный Яр, Vilva, Мысья, Родники.

In 2013 the 75th anniversary of the establishment of Usollag was celebrated by the veterans of Perm division of Federal Penitentiary Service of Russia, including an official announcement and a festive concert.

== Notable inmates ==
=== Estonians ===
- August Ehrlich (1893–1942) – politician
- August Gustavson (1884–1942) – politician
- Nigul Kaliste (1894–1941) – politician
- Aleksander Oinas (1887–1942) – politician, M.P.
- Karl-Eduard Pajos (1894–1953) – politician
- Johannes Perens (1906–1941) – politician
- Villem Raam (1910–1996) – art historian, art critic and conservator-restorer
- Nikolai Reek (1890–1942) – military commander
- Aleksander Rei (1900–1943) – politician
- Carl Sarap (1893–1942) – editor and photographer
- Jaan Soots (1880–1942) – military commander and politician
- Järvo Tandre (1899–1943) – politician
- Artur Toom (1884–1942) – ornithologist and conservationist
- Artur Tupits (1892–1941) – politician
- Richard Veermaa (1901–1942) – politician
- Mathias Westerblom (1888–1942) – politician

=== Latvians ===
- Ludvigs Adamovičs (1884–1943) – Lutheran pastor, minister of education of Latvia
- Emīlija Benjamiņa (1881–1941) – businesswoman and publisher
- Krišjānis Berķis (1884–1942) – general, minister of war
- Rihards Bērziņš (1888–1942) – social activist, man of letters, founder of the first Latvian news agency LETA
- Alfrēds Birznieks (1889–1942) – politician and lawyer
- Andrejs Veckalns (1879–1942) – politician
- Mārtiņš Jeske (1883–1941) – general and state official
- Jēkabs Grots (1888–1942) – judge, member of the Supreme Court ("Senate") of Latvia
- Jānis Kaminskis (1878–1942) – civil engineer and statesman
- Vilhelms Ķuze (1875–1941) – teacher and businessman
- Frīdrihs Vesmanis (1875–1941) – lawyer and politician
- Alfrēds Valeika (1889–1941) – aviator

=== Other ===
- Rudolf Hamburger – German architect
- Kuksha of Odessa (1875–1964) – Ukrainian Orthodox Church (Moscow Patriarchate) saint, canonized in 1995
- Lev Razgon (1908–1999) – Soviet writer and human rights activist
- Heinrich Alexander Stoll – German writer
- Mikhail Tanich (1923–2008) – Russian song lyric writer
- Philipp Tolziner (1906–1996) – German and Soviet architect
