= Voldemar Jaanus =

Estonian politician (1905–1977)

Voldemar Jaanus (5 July 1905 Kodila Parish (now Rapla Parish), Kreis Harrien – 19 January 1977) was an Estonian politician. He was a member of VI Riigikogu (its Chamber of Deputies).
