= Isamaaliit =

Isamaaliit (Estonian, lit. 'Fatherland Union') may refer to:

- Patriotic League (Estonia), a political movement in Estonia 1935–40
- Pro Patria Union, a political party in Estonia 1995–2006
