= Jaan Soots =

Estonian general and politician

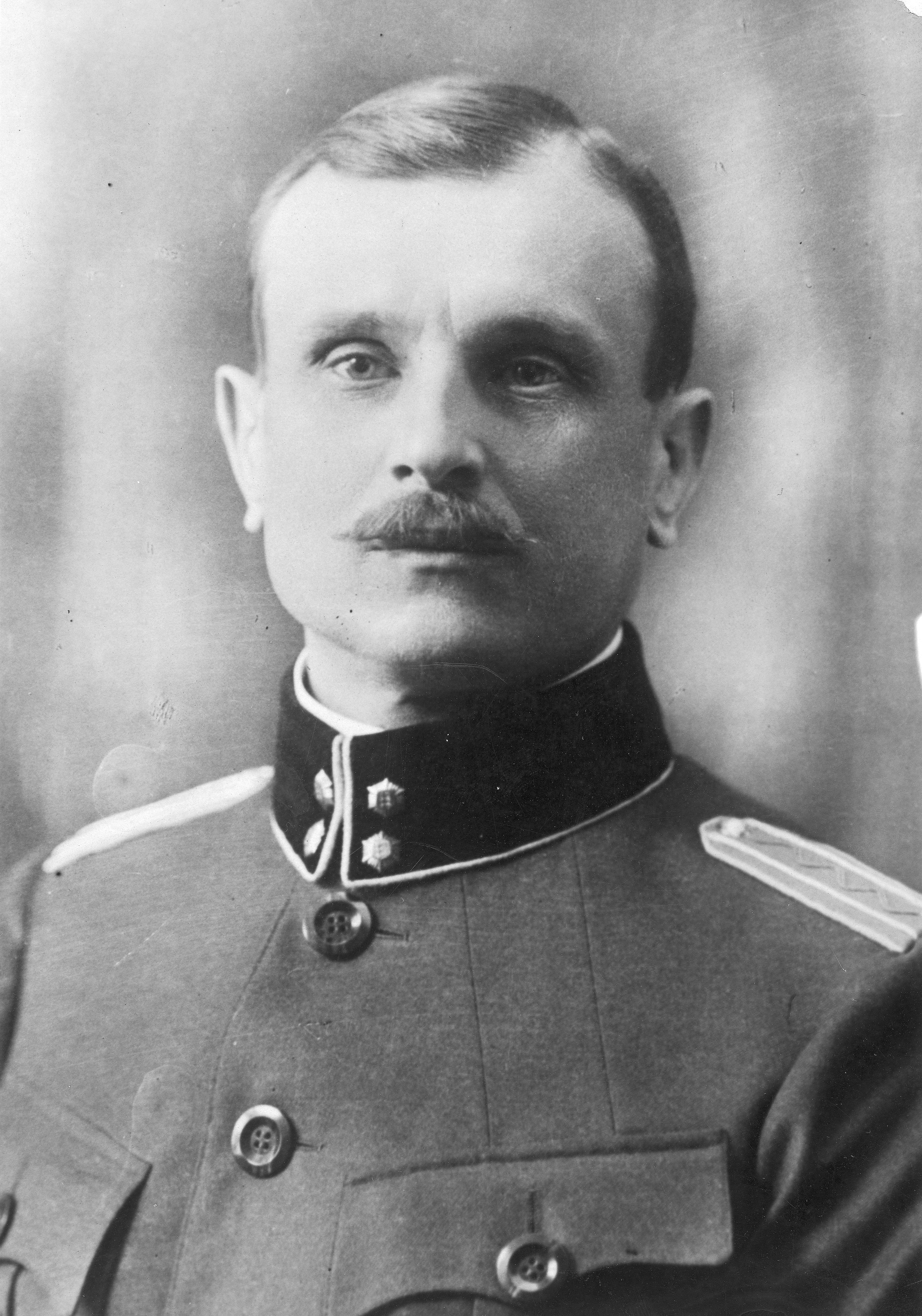
- Born: 12 March 1880; Livonia, Russian Empire
- Died: 6 February 1942 (aged 61)
- Allegiance: Russian Empire; Estonia
- Service years: 1900–1920
- Rank: Major general
- Conflicts: Russo-Japanese War; World War I; Estonian War of Independence
- Awards: Estonian Cross of Liberty; Order of the White Star; Order of Lāčplēsis; Order of Saint Stanislaus; Order of Saint Anna; Order of Saint Vladimir

Jaan Soots (12 March [O.S. 29 February] 1880 – 6 February 1942) was an Estonian military commander during the Estonian War of Independence and politician.

Jaan Soots was born in Küti farmstead, Linna village, Helme Parish, Viljandi County (now in Tõrva Parish, Valga County), Governorate of Livonia, Russian Empire. He joined the army voluntarily in 1900, studied between 1901 and 1904 at Vilnius Military Academy, participated in the Russo-Japanese War and from 1910 to 1913 studied at the Imperial Nicholas Military Academy. At the beginning of the Estonian War of Independence, Soots was Chief of Operative Staff; in February 1919 he became Chief of Staff of the Commander-in-Chief. In 1919, Soots also achieved the rank of Major General. Soots also participated in the Tartu peace conference and retired in 1920. Later, he was twice a Minister of War, member of the State Assembly, Mayor and Lord Mayor (ülemlinnapea) of Tallinn. In 1938, he received Herbert Hoover, who, as an honorary citizen of Tallinn, visited Estonia. In 1940, Soviet occupation authorities arrested Soots and in 1942 he died in Ussollag prison camp in Usolye, Perm Oblast.

Soots is recipient of the Estonian Order of the White Star, 1st class; the Latvian military Order of Lāčplēsis, 2nd class; the Latvian Order of the Three Stars, 1st Class (14 Nov 1928).

== See also ==
- Estonian War of Independence
- Freikorps in the Baltic

Political offices
Preceded by Ants Piip	Minister of War; 1921 - 1923	Succeeded by Ado Anderkopp
Preceded by Hans Kurvits	Minister of War; 1924 - 1927	Succeeded by Nikolai Reek
Preceded by Anton Uesson	Lord Mayor of Tallinn; 1934 - 1939	Succeeded by Aleksander Tõnisson
