= Johan Hagivang =

Estonian politician (1878–1942)

Johan Hagivang (also Juhan Haagivang; 20 January 1878 Palometsa, Kasaritsa Parish (now Võru Parish), Kreis Werro – 30 November 1942 Sevurallag, Sverdlovsk Oblast) was an Estonian politician. He was a member of the IV Riigikogu, representing the Farmers' Assemblies.
