= Oskar Lõvi =

Oskar Lõvi may refer to:

- Oskar Lõvi (agronomist) (1892–1977), Estonian agronomist, politician
- Oskar Lõvi (journalist) (1903–1942), Estonian sportjournalist, politician
