= Roslavlev =

Roslavlev feminine: Roslavleva is a Russian surname of the noble Roslavlev family

- Lyubov Roslavleva
- Natalia Roslavleva
- Vladimir Roslavlev
