= Eduard Arnover =

Estonian politician (1899–1942)

Eduard Arnover (15 December 1899 Lellapere (now Kehtna Parish), Kreis Harrien, Governorate of Estonia – 26 August 1942 Syktyvkar, Komi ASSR) was an Estonian politician. He was a member of VI Riigikogu (its Chamber of Deputies).
