= Hanila =

Village in Estonia

Coordinates: 58°37′N 23°37′E

- Village
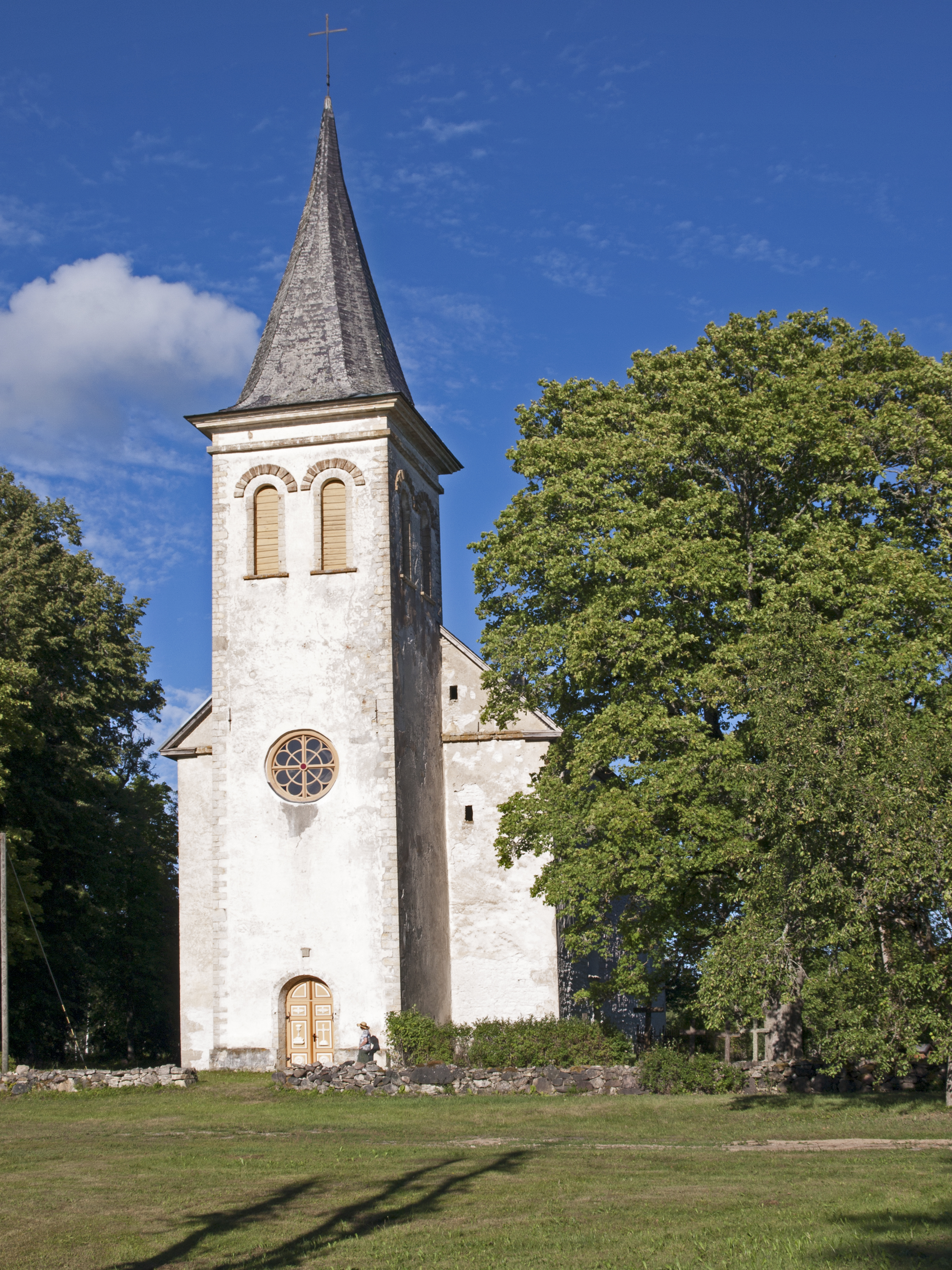
- Hanila Church
- Interactive map of Hanila
- Country: Estonia
- County: Pärnu County
- Parish: Lääneranna Parish
- Time zone: UTC+2 (EET)
  - Summer (DST): UTC+3 (EEST)

Hanila is a village in Lääneranna Parish, Pärnu County in western Estonia. The village is home to the Hanila Museum and Hanila Church.

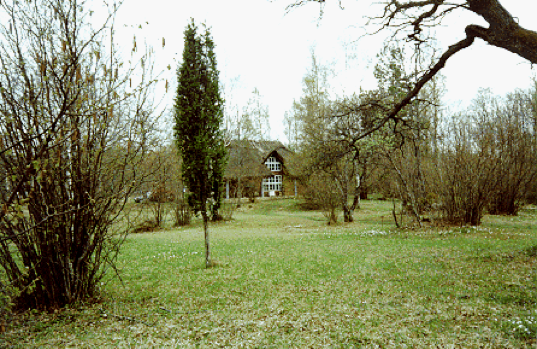
Laelatu biological station (before 2011)

The Laelatu Biological Station is also located in the village. The station was mainly established to study the unique Laelatu wooded meadow. In 2007, the old station was destroyed by a fire. The new station was opened in 2015. The station belongs to the University of Tartu.

== Notable people ==
Notable people that were born or lived in Hanila include the following:

- Ado Anderkopp (1894–1941), politician and journalist
