= Jakob Kalle =

Estonian politician

Jakob Kalle (9 April 1896 Kolga Parish (now Kuusalu Parish), Kreis Harrien – 20 April 1942 Sevurallag, Sverdlovsk Oblast) was an Estonian politician. He was a member of VI Riigikogu (its Chamber of Deputies).
