= Eduard Pedosk =

Estonian politician

Eduard Pedosk (also Eduard Peedosk; 17 August 1897 Räpina Parish, Kreis Werro – 9 June 1977 Alaküla Selsoviet, Põlva District) was an Estonian politician. He was a member of the VI Riigikogu (its Chamber of Deputies).
