= Aleksander Onno =

Estonian politician

Aleksander Onno (15 January 1898 Võru – 11 June 1969 Stockholm) was an Estonian agronomist and politician. He was a member of VI Riigikogu (its National Council).
