= Värdi Velner =

Estonian politician (1907–1992)

Värdi Velner (also Ferdy Velner, Ferdinand Velner (Vellner); 27 September 1907 Sangaste Parish (now Otepää Parish), Kreis Dorpat – 14 September 1992 Tartu) was an Estonian politician. He was a member of the VI Riigikogu (its Chamber of Deputies). He served as Governor of Valga County from 1936 until 1940, when he was dismissed by the Vares Government, which had come about as a result of the Soviet occupation of Estonia in June 1940. He again served as Governor of Valga County from 1941 until 1943, during the German occupation of Estonia and within the framework of the Estonian Self-Administration of Generalbezirk Estland. He was imprisoned by Soviet authorities from 1944 until 1954.
