= Kristjan-Eduard Jalak =

Estonian politician

Kristjan-Eduard Jalak (21 March 1882 Kastre Parish, Kreis Dorpat – 8 September 1944 Leningrad) was an Estonian politician, a member of the Communist Party of Estonia. He was a member of VI Riigikogu (its Chamber of Deputies).
