= Ernst Särgava =

Estonian politician

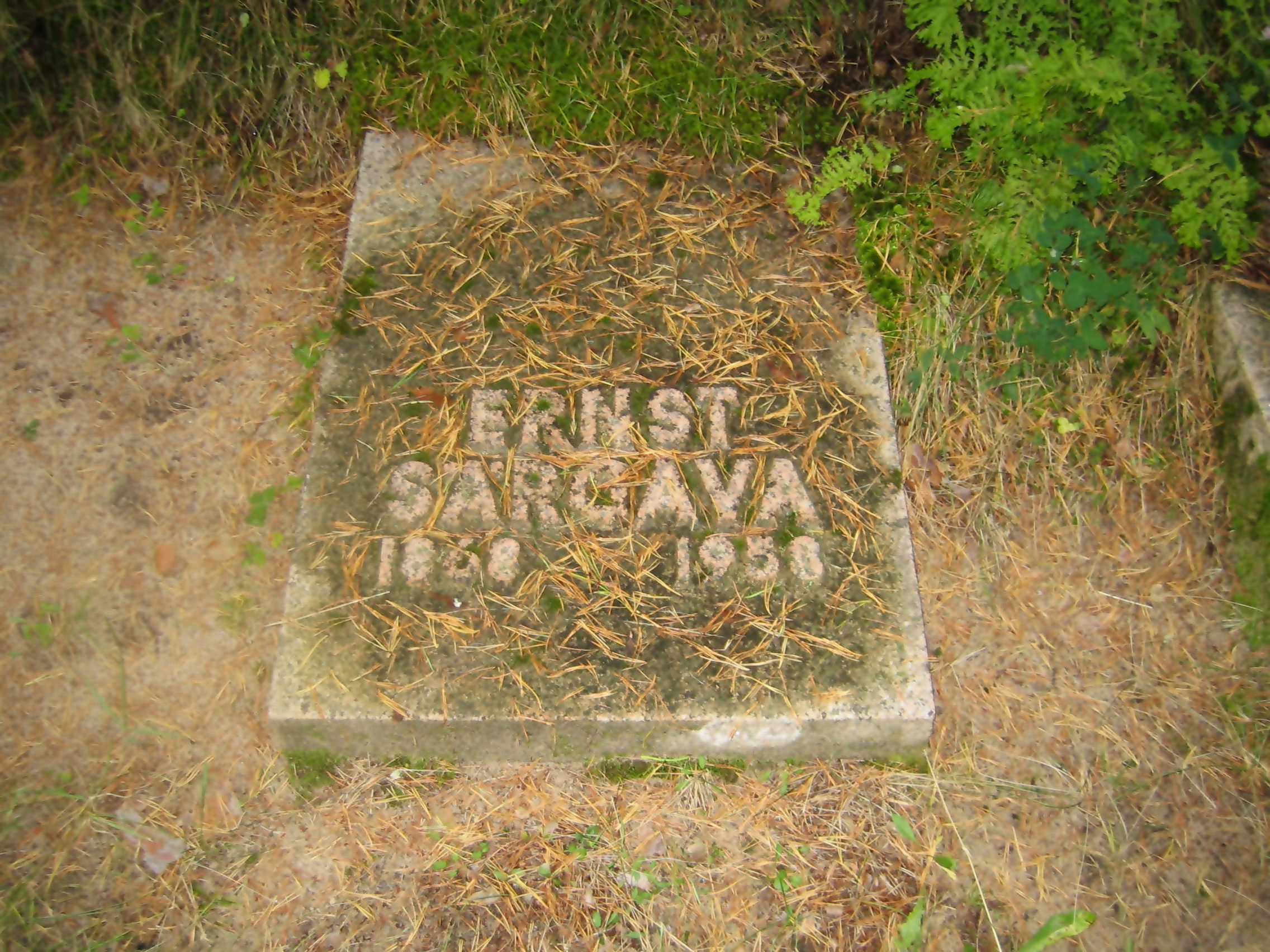
Grave of Ernst Särgava at Metsakalmistu Cemetery

Ernst Särgava (born as Karl Ernst Peterson, until 1935 Ernst Peterson, also Ernst Peterson-Särgava; 29 April 1868 Vana-Vändra Parish (now Põhja-Pärnumaa Parish), Kreis Pernau – 12 April 1958 Tallinn) was an Estonian writer, playwright and politician.

1889-1906 he worked as a teacher and schoolmaster in schools in Sindi, Põltsamaa, Kose-Uuemõisa and Rakvere. Since 1906 he was a teacher in various schools in Tallinn.

1907-1918 and 1930-1933 he was a member of Tallinn City Council. He was a member of VI Riigikogu (its Chamber of Deputies).

He died in 1958 and is buried at Metsakalmistu Cemetery.

== Works ==
- 1899–1901: three-volume novel series "Paised" ('Dams')
- 1904: novel "Rahvavalgustaja" ('Enlightener of the People')
- 1905: novel "Liisi"
- 1907: novel "Elsa"
