= Valter-Gerhard Kadarik =

Estonian politician

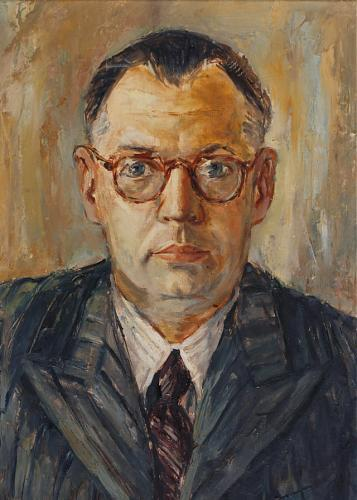
Valter-Gerhard Kadarik

Valter-Gerhard Kadarik (also Valter-Gerhard Freimann; 25 July 1898 Juuru Parish (now Rapla Parish), Kreis Harrien – 11 July 1975 Juuru Selsoviet, Rapla Parish) was an Estonian politician. He was a member of the Chamber of Deputies (Riigivolikogu) of VI Riigikogu.
