= August Jürima (Estonian politician, 1902–1947) =

Estonian politician

August Jürima (also August Jürman(n); 8 February 1902 Pajusi Parish (now Põltsamaa Parish), Kreis Fellin – 9 January 1947 Erlangen, American Zone, Allied-occupied Germany) was an Estonian politician. He was a member of VI Riigikogu (its Chamber of Deputies).
