= Jaana =

Female given name

Jaana is a feminine given name, the feminine version of Jaan, the short form of Marianne, and a pet form of Johanna. It is common in Estonia and Finland.

== People ==
- Jaana Bäck (b. 1961), Finnish plant ecologist, professor
- Jaana Padrik (born 1958), Estonian journalist and politician
- Jaana Pelkonen (born 1977), Finnish politician and television host
- Jaana Kunitz (born 1972), Finnish ballroom dancer
- Jaana Saarinen (born 1955), Finnish actress
- Jaana Savolainen (born 1964), Finnish, cross-country skier

== In fiction ==
- Jaana the druid, fictional character in Ultima game series.
