= Vooglaid =

Vooglaid is an Estonian surname. Notable people with the surname include:

- Ülo Vooglaid (born 1935), Estonian sociologist, educator, and politician
- Varro Vooglaid (born 1980), Estonian lawyer, activist, and politician

== See also ==
- Voolaid, surname
