= Aleksander Rei =

Estonian politician (1900–1943)

Aleksander Rei (24 January 1900 Uuemõisa Parish, Saare County – 6 November 1943 Usollag, Perm Oblast) was an Estonian politician. He was a member of the Estonian National Assembly and VI Riigikogu (its Chamber of Deputies).
