= Aleksander Naeres =

Estonian politician (1885–1942)

Aleksander Naeres (also Aleksander Naeris; 19 July 1885 Martna Parish, Lääne County – 29 June 1942 Tavda, Sverdlovsk Oblast) was an Estonian politician. He was a member of VI Riigikogu (its National Council).
