= Albert Kendra =

Estonian politician

Albert Kendra (14 December 1883 Laitsna-Rogosi Parish, Võru County – 24 April 1942 Sevurallag, Perm Oblast) was an Estonian politician and a member of VI Riigikogu (its Chamber of Deputies). He was arrested by the NKVD on 7 June 1941 and sentenced to death through execution by gunshot in the Sosva prison camp.
