= Rein Marrandi =

Estonian politician

Rein Marrandi (also Reinhold Ehrenwerth; 21 January 1883 Juuru Parish, Harju County – 1974) was an Estonian politician. He was a member of VI Riigikogu (its National Council).
