= August Miljan =

Estonian politician (1889–1973)

August Miljan (7 September 1889 Pilkuse Parish, Kreis Dorpat – 25 August 1973 Tartu) was an Estonian agronomist, educator and politician. He was a member of the Estonian National Assembly, VI Riigikogu (its Chamber of Deputies).

From 1929 until 1940, he was the principal of Jäneda Agricultural School. Later, he was the director of the Experimental Institute for Soil Research, the head of the plant breeding department of the Faculty of Agriculture of Tartu State University and the head of the Tartu Botanical Gardens.
