= Louis Metslang =

Estonian politician

Louis Metslang (also Lui Metslang; 17 October 1906 Kaarepere Parish (now Jõgeva Parish), Kreis Dorpat – 8 June 1942 Tallinn) was an Estonian politician. He was a member of VI Riigikogu (its Chamber of Deputies).
