= Hendrik Otstavel =

Estonian politician (1888–1942)

Hendrik Otstavel (2 October 1888 Surju – 11 February 1942) was an Estonian politician. He was a member of VI Riigikogu (National Council).

Otstavel was born in Surju. Following the Soviet occupation of Estonia in 1940, Otstavel was arrested by the NKVD and imprisoned with the gulag camp system. He was executed by gunshot on 11 February 1941.
