= Artur Tupits =

Estonian politician (1892–1941)

Artur Tupits (8 October 1892, in Puurmani Parish (now Põltsamaa Parish), Kreis Dorpat – 28 October 1941, in Ussolye prison camp, Perm Oblast, Russian SFSR) was an Estonian politician. He was a member of the I, II, III, IV, and V Riigikogu.

From 1932–1933, 1938–1939, and 1939–1940, he was Minister of Agriculture.
