= Kokk (surname) =

Family name

Kokk is an Estonian occupational surname literally meaning "cook".

- Aivar Kokk (born 1960), Estonian politician
- Eela Kokk, Estonian para swimmer
- Enn Kokk (1937–2019), Estonian-born Swedish Social Democratic politician, journalist and writer
- Jaan Kokk (1903–1942), Estonian politician
- Kaspar Kokk (born 1982), Estonian cross-country skier
- Marten Kokk (born 1973), Estonian diplomat and statesman
- Rene Kokk (born 1980), Estonian politician
