= Järvo Tandre =

Estonian politician

Järvo Tandre (also Rudolf Stockeby; 22 October 1899 Väinjärve Parish, Järva County – 30 August 1943 Usollag prison camp, Perm Oblast) was an Estonian politician. He was a member of VI Riigikogu (its Chamber of Deputies).
