= Nigul Kaliste =

Estonian politician

Nigul Kaliste (also Nikolai Kalinin; 8 May 1884 in Mäe Parish, Võru County – 7 May 1942 in Ussolye prison camp, Perm Oblast) was an Estonian politician. He was a member of VI Riigikogu (its Chamber of Deputies) and the Mayor of Mäe Parish.

Kalsie was arrested by Soviet NKVD agents on 12 May 1941 and shot.
