= National Front for the Implementation of the Constitution =

Electoral coalition in Estonia

The National Front for the Implementation of the Constitution (Estonian: Põhiseaduse Elluviimise Rahvarinne, PER) was a 1938 electoral coalition in Estonia closely aligned with the Patriotic League.

== History ==
In 1936—two years after Konstantin Päts's self-coup in 1934—the Patriotic League had been established as the sole legal political movement in the country, while the activities of all political parties were suspended due to state of emergency. A National Assembly was elected in 1936 to draw up a new constitution. Prior to the 1938 elections the leaders of the Patriotic League set up the National Front to run in the elections, which were not entirely free and fair. The PER was effectively the only organisation to campaign in the elections, where only individual candidates were able to run. The PER won 64 of the 80 seats, eight of them unopposed.
