= Martin Rõigas =

Estonian politician

Martin Rõigas (also Mart Rõigas; 22 October 1908 – 13 July 1941) was an Estonian politician. He was a member of VI Riigikogu (its Chamber of Deputies).

Martin Rõigas was born in Abja Parish (now Mulgi Parish) in Kreis Pernau to farmers Hans and Maria "Marri" Rõigas (née Meltsas). He attended schools in Puhja before studying at the University of Tartu. Following the Soviet occupation of Estonia in 1940, he was killed by Red Army soldiers in Vara Parish in 1941, aged 32.
