= Viluvere =

Village in Estonia

Coordinates: 58°39′N 24°53′E

- Village
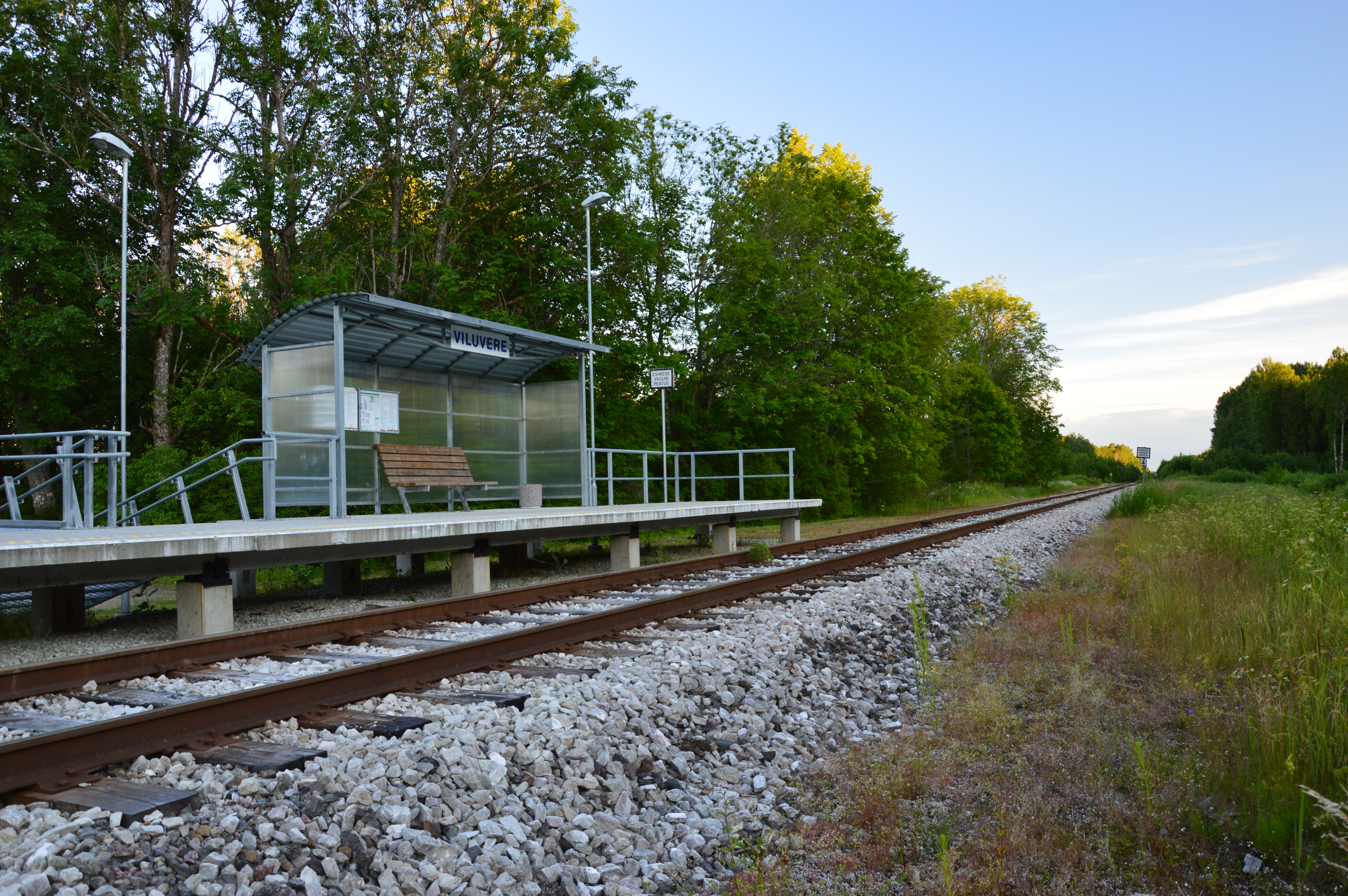
- Viluvere railway line
- Interactive map of Viluvere
- Country: Estonia
- County: Pärnu County
- Parish: Põhja-Pärnumaa Parish
- Time zone: UTC+2 (EET)
  - Summer (DST): UTC+3 (EEST)

Viluvere (German: Willofer) is a village in Põhja-Pärnumaa Parish, Pärnu County in western-central Estonia.

It had a station on the Tallinn - Pärnu railway line operated by Elron, which closed in December 2018.

Military commander Avdy Andresson (1899–1990) was born in Viluvere.
