= Evald Konno =

Estonian politician

Evald Konno (13 February 1897 Tartu – 20 April 1942 Sevurallag, Sverdlovsk Oblast) was an Estonian politician and lawyer. He was a member of VI Riigikogu (its Chamber of Deputies).
