= Johannes Perens =

Estonian politician (1906–1941)

Johannes Perens (26 September 1906 Kaavi, Torgu Parish (now Saaremaa Parish), Kreis Ösel – 25 December 1941 Ussolye prison camp, Perm Oblast) was an Estonian politician. He was a member of the V Riigikogu.
