= Aleksis Tsänk =

Estonian politician

Aleksis Tsänk (12 August 1908 in Meremäe Parish, Võru County – 20 April 1942 in Sevurallag, Sverdlovsk Oblast) was an Estonian politician. He was a member of VI Riigikogu (its Chamber of Deputies).
