= Ernst Haabpiht =

Estonian politician (1898–1942)

Ernst Haabpiht (also Ernst Habicht; 21 August 1898 Helme Parish (now Tõrva Parish), Kreis Fellin – 4 May 1942 Sevurallag, Sverdlovsk Oblast) was an Estonian politician. He was a member of VI Riigikogu (its Chamber of Deputies).
