= Karl-Arnold Jalakas =

Estonian politician (1901–1942)

Karl-Arnold Jalakas (10 February 1901 Tallinn – 3 August 1942 Sverdlovsk) was an Estonian politician. He was a member of VI Riigikogu (its Chamber of Deputies).
