= Herman Soone =

Estonian politician

Herman Soone (?–?) was an Estonian politician. He was a member of VI Riigikogu, being the Secretary of the National Council.
