= Alo Karineel =

Estonian politician

Alo Karineel (also Aleksander-Oskar Karineel, Kornel, or Kornell; 14 January 1892, in Vastse-Antsla Parish (now Antsla Parish), Kreis Werro – 2 April 1942, in Sukhobezvodnaya Station, Gorki Oblast) was an Estonian politician. He was a member of the III, IV, and V Riigikogu, of the Estonian National Assembly, and of the Riigivolikogu. He joined the Riigikogu on 18 November 1926, when he replaced Heinrich Laretei.
