= Karl Kaups =

Estonian politician

Karl Kaups (29 December 1888 Kärdla – 8 October 1968 New York) was an Estonian politician and Baptist clergyman. He was a member of VI Riigikogu (its Chamber of Deputies).

== Early life and career ==
Kaups received his primary education at Nõmba Primary School, after which he worked as a sailor and at the Volta industrial factory in Tallinn. Kaups furthered his education by taking evening courses.

He received his religious education at the Mennonite Bible School in Crimea from 1911 and 1912, and at the Baptist Theological Seminary in Hamburg, Germany, from 1912 until 1914. Afterward, he was a traveling preacher between 1914 and 1915, and from 1915 to 1917 he took part in World War I, where he lost his left leg. From 1918, Kaups worked as a preacher in Baptist congregations in Kärdla and in from 1924 until 1940 in Tartu. From 1923 until 1931, he also acted as the Chairman of the Haapsalu Orphanage.

In 1938, he was elected to the Chamber of Deputies of the State Assembly (Riigivolikogu). After the Soviet occupation of Estonia in June 1940, he returned to Kärdla. On the night of 24 September 1944, Kaups fled to Sweden, where he continued his missionary work as a preacher and elder until the autumn of 1946, when he was invited by the Estonian Baptist Church in New York to preach in the United States, where he made a permanent home.

== Personal life and death ==
Kaups married Hilda Eller in 1920, and they had a son and a daughter. Hilda Kaups died in 1927. In 1937, Kaups married Elsa Eller, and they had two sons and a daughter. His daughter Mai Kaups (1921–1961) was married to Swedish diplomat Bertil Arvidson.

Karl Kaups died in New York in 1968 and is buried in Moravian Cemetery on Staten Island.

== Acknowldgements ==
- Order of the Estonian Red Cross, III Class (1938)
