= Artur Kasterpalu =

Estonian politician

Artur Leonhard Kasterpalu (14 July 1897 in Jõgisoo Parish, Lääne County – 2 June 1942 in Sverdlovsk, Soviet Union) was an Estonian politician. He was a member of VI Riigikogu (its Chamber of Deputies).
