= Peeter Malvet =

Estonian military personnel and politician

Peeter-Ernst Malvet (born Peeter Ernst Mahlstein; 3 April 1907 – 9 September 1978) was an Estonian military soldier, jurist and politician. He was a member of VI Riigikogu, being Secretary of the Chamber of Deputies.

Peeter-Ernst Malvet was born Peeter Ernst Mahlstein in Narva. He studied at the Department of Commerce of the Department of Law of the University of Tartu in 1925 until 1926 and at the Department of Law in 1926 and graduated in 1932. In 1934, he graduated from the Estonian Military Academy with a postgraduate course and was promoted to ensign.

From 1933 until 1936, he was a candidate for the court office of Rakvere Circuit Court. From In 1936 until 1938, he was the secretary of the Estonian Honorary Consulate in Stettin with Georg Behm. from 1938 until 1940, he was the Secretary of the Secretary of the Chamber of Deputies of the Riigivolikogu.

Following the occupation of Estonia during World War II, Malvet fled to Sweden in 1943. In 1948, he emigrated to Canada. He died in Montreal in 1978.
