= Henn Treial =

Estonian politician (1905–1941)

Henn Treial (born Herbert Treial; 15 October 1905 Aardla – 19 November 1941 Tartu) was an Estonian journalist, editor and politician. He was a member of VI Riigikogu (its Chamber of Deputies).
