= Usolye =

Usolye (Russian: Усо́лье) is the name of several inhabited localities in Russia. The name is an archaic Russian term for a salt-producing locality.

Urban localities

- Usolye, Usolsky District, Perm Krai, a town in Usolsky District of Perm Krai
- Usolye, old name of Solvychegodsk
- Old name of Usolye-Sibirskoye, a town in Usolsky District of Irkutsk Oblast

Rural localities

- Usolye, Kirov Oblast, a village in Slobodskoy District of Kirov Oblast
- Usolye, Okhansky District, Perm Krai, a village in Okhansky District of Perm Krai

== See also ==
- Usolye prison camp, a Gulag camp
