= 1936 Estonian National Assembly election =

1936 Estonian elections for bicameral national assembly

National Assembly elections were held in Estonia between 12 and 14 December 1936. As the activities of all parties were suspended, only individual candidates were allowed to run. Candidates affiliated with the pro-government Patriotic League ran in all 80 constituencies, but only 30 of them were contested by one or more opposition candidates. Voter turnout was 57.8%.

== Results ==
Party	Votes	%
Patriotic League		
Others		
Total		
Valid votes	150,167	95.96
Invalid/blank votes	6,323	4.04
Total votes	156,490	100.00
Registered voters/turnout	270,540	57.84
Source: Nohlen & Stöver
