= Elmar-Aleksander Lehtmets =

Estonian politician (1901–1942)

Elmar-Aleksander Lehtmets (14 December 1901 Paasvere Parish, Virumaa – 17 July 1942 Sevurallag, Sverdlovsk Oblast) was an Estonian lawyer, journalist and politician. He was a member of VI Riigikogu (its Chamber of Deputies).

Lehmets was arrested by the NKVD following the Soviet occupation of Estonia during World War II and executed.
