= Karl-Eduard Pajos =

Estonian politician (1894–1953)

Karl-Eduard Pajos (also Karl-Eduard Pajus; 2 July 1894 Rakvere Parish, Kreis Wierland – 23 May 1953 Ussolye prison camp, Perm Oblast) was an Estonian politician. He was a member of IV Riigikogu. On 20 May 1930, he resigned his position and he was replaced by August Julius Leps.
