= Mihkel Reimann =

Estonian politician

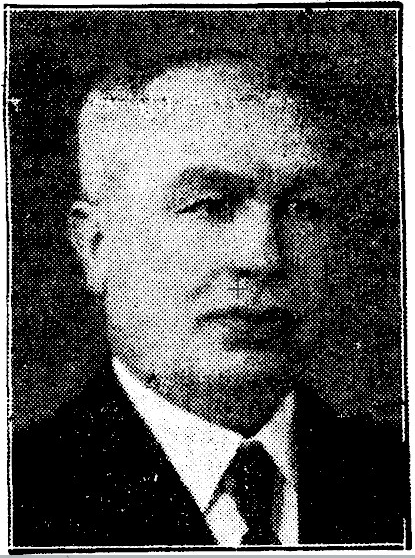
- Born: July 19, 1889; Väätsa Parish, Kreis Jerwen, Governorate of Estonia, Russian Empire
- Died: November 26, 1968 (aged 79)
- Occupation: Politician
- Spouse: Miina Reimann

Mihkel Reimann (19 July 1889 Väätsa Parish, Kreis Jerwen – 26 November 1968) was an Estonian politician. He was a member of VI Riigikogu (its Chamber of Deputies).
