= Mihkel Hansen =

Estonian politician (1904–2004)

Mihkel Hansen (29 December 1904 Lelle Parish (now Kehtna Parish), Kreis Pernau – 20 November 2004 Toronto) was an Estonian politician. He was a member of the V Riigikogu, of the Estonian National Assembly and of the I Riigivolikogu. From 1937 until 1940, he served as Governor of Valga County, until he was dismissed by the Vares Government, which had come about as a result of the Soviet occupation of Estonia in June 1940. From 1941 until 1943, during the German occupation of Estonia, he again served as Governor of Valga County, this time within the framework of the Estonian Self-Administration of Generalbezirk Estland. In 1944, he served as Governor of Võru County for a short period. As the Red Army was approaching, he went into exile.
