= Heinrich Neuhaus (entrepreneur) =

Estonian entrepreneur and politician

Heinrich Neuhaus (25 April 1886 - 12 May 1949) was an Estonian entrepreneur and politician. He was a member of Riiginõukogu.

He was born in Tallinn.
