= Harry Eduard Ottokar Koch =

Estonian politician

Harry Eduard Ottokar Koch (18 July 1880 Võru County – 3 June 1939 Frankfurt am Main) was an Estonian politician. He was a member of VI Riigikogu (its National Council). On 3 December 1938, he resigned his position and he was replaced by Wilhelm von Wrangell.
