= Eduard Riisna =

Estonian politician

Eduard Riisna (born Eduard Riismann; 6 March 1898, Keava – 2 November 1990 Toronto) was an Estonian politician. He was a member of VI Riigikogu (its Chamber of Deputies).

Following the German occupation of Estonia, Riisna was jailed in 1944. The same year, when the Soviets reoccupied Estonia, Riisna, along with his wife Olga and children (including daughter Ene), fled the country by a small boat and were rescued by the Swedish Coast Guard. The family settled in Sweden for several years, living in DP camps and with several Swedish families. After seven years in Sweden, the family emigrated to Canada.
