= Jüri Nuut =

Estonian politician (1892–1952)

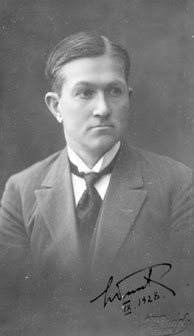
Jüri Nuut

Jüri Nuut (also Jüri Nuth; 10 July 1892 Peterburi – 31 May 1952 Tallinn) was an Estonian politician. He was a member of VI Riigikogu (its National Council). He was a member of the Riigikogu since 24 October 1939. He replaced Paul Nikolai Kogerman.
