= Rudolf Riives =

Estonian politician

Rudolf Riives (18 June 1890 Vana-Kuuste Parish, Tartu County – 23 June 1941 Tallinn) was an Estonian military officer (captain) and politician. He was a member of VI Riigikogu (its Chamber of Deputies).
