= Arnold Tartu =

Estonian politician (1910–1986)

Arnold Tartu (1 August 1910 Haljala Parish, Virumaa – 25 July 1986 Harku Selsoviet, Harju District) was an Estonian politician. He was a member of VI Riigikogu (its Chamber of Deputies).
