= Hugo Villi Kukke =

Estonian politician (1898–1942)

Hugo Villi Kukke (1 March 1898 in Pala Parish (now Peipsiääre Parish), Kreis Dorpat – 3 August 1942 in Sverdlovsk, Russian SFSR) was an Estonian politician and newspaper editor. He was a member of the IV Riigikogu and V Riigikogu.

From 1932 until 1933, he was Minister of Education and Social Affairs. Following the Soviet occupation of Estonia in 1940, Kukke was arrested in Tallinn in 1941 and sentenced to death by a military tribunal of the USSR. He was executed in Sverdlovsk in 1942.
