= Jaan Masing =

Estonian politician (1875–1948)

Jaan Masing (31 January 1875 Vana-Kariste Parish, Kreis Pernau – 21 September 1948 Tallinn) was an Estonian politician. He was a member of IV Riigikogu.

He was a member of Asutav Kogu.
