= Leonhard Vahter =

Estonian politician

Leonhard Vahter (14 March 1896 Mahu Parish, Virumaa – 12 February 1983 New York, USA) was an Estonian politician. He was a member of VI Riigikogu (its Chamber of Deputies).
