= Karl Puusemp =

Estonian politician

Karl Puusemp (21 October 1903, in Tähtvere Parish, Tartu County – 18 June 1978, in Türi) was an Estonian politician. He was a member of VI Riigikogu (its Chamber of Deputies).
