= Juhan Uuemaa =

Estonian politician (1903–1942)

Juhan Uuemaa (born Juhan Neumann; 24 July 1903 Hummuli Parish, Viljandi County – 10 April 1942 Kirov, Russia) was an Estonian politician and lawyer. He was a member of VI Riigikogu (its Chamber of Deputies).
