= Karl Jürison =

Estonian politician (1900–1953)

Karl Jürison (23 October 1900 Viljandi – 13 May 1953 Vorkuta, Komi Republic) was an Estonian politician. He was a member of VI Riigikogu (its Chamber of Deputies).
