= Juhan Kaarlimäe =

Estonian politician (1901–1977)

Juhan Kaarlimäe (born Johann Karlsberg; 21 November 1901 – 5 February 1977) was an Estonian politician. He was a member of V Riigikogu. He was born in Vana-Vändra Parish (now Põhja-Pärnumaa Parish), Kreis Pernau, and died in Raikküla Selsoviet, Rapla District.
