= Karl Roomet =

Estonian politician

Karl Roomet (2 September 1902 – 27 July 1941) was an Estonian politician. He was born in Vaimastvere Parish (present-day Jõgeva Parish) and was a member of VI Riigikogu (its Chamber of Deputies).

Following the Soviet occupation of Estonia in 1940, Roomet became involved with the Estonian partisan Forest Brothers. He was later executed by the NKVD in Vaimastvere Parish in 1941.
