= Aleksander Aben =

Estonian politician

Aleksander Aben (19 July 1908 Kaarma Parish (now Saaremaa Parish), Kreis Ösel – 11 October 1991 Tallinn) was an Estonian politician. He was a member of VI Riigikogu (its Chamber of Deputies). On 26 August 1939, he was removed from his position and he was replaced by Aleksander Jõeäär. After years in exile in the USSR and return to Estonia he was imprisoned in 1950, then rehabilitated in 1950.

== Early years ==
Aleksander Aben studied at the Kaarma primary school and in 1922 entered the Saaremaa Ühisgymnasium, from which he was expelled at the beginning of 1925 on charges of anti-state activities. He worked as a farm worker, in 1931 he was invited to become the secretary of the Pärnumaa committee of the National Agricultural Workers' Union. In January 1933, he moved to Tallinn as an instructor at the Estonian Workers' Education Union. From April 1934 to July 1939, he worked at the Tallinn Joint Health Insurance Fund, first as an auditor of facilities and later as deputy head of the inspection department.

== Political career in Estonia ==
In the years 1929–1934, Aben was a member of the Estonian Socialist Workers' Party. In the spring of 1938, Aben was elected to the 1st State Council from Tallinn's 9th electoral district. On July 4, 1939, he was sentenced by the Military High Court to five years of hard labor for distributing a leaflet disparaging the president and the government. He fled to Sweden, where he lived as a political refugee until the June coup of 1940. In 1939, Aleksander Jõeäär became a substitute deputy to the First State Council instead of Aben.

== Soviet political career ==
After returning from Sweden in 1940, Aben was appointed chairman of the Central Council of Trade Unions, and after being accepted as a member of Communist Party of Estonia (bolsheviks) ("EK(b)P"), state auditor of Johannes Vares' government. Soon, Aben was appointed as the deputy chairman of the Main Committee for the Supply of Land for Peasants with Land and Small Land and as the head of the agricultural department of the Central Committee of EK(b)P.

During the Second World War, after being evacuated to the rear of the Soviet Union in the summer of 1941, Aben first worked as the secretary of the party office of the 354th Rifle Regiment of the 7th Estonian Rifle Division and later as the managing editor of the Punaväelane newspaper of the same division. In February 1944, he was appointed editor-in-chief of Tasuja, the official publication of the partisan movement, and Taluralvaleht, the official publication of the ECB Central Committee, published in Leningrad.

In May 1944, Aben was enrolled in the courses organized by the Higher Diplomatic School of the Ministry of Foreign Affairs of the USSR by the decision of the EK(b)P Central Committee office in May 1944. After completing them, he became the assistant to the People's Commissar of Foreign Affairs of the Estonian Soviet Socialist Republic and from August 1949, the deputy minister of foreign affairs. In 1945–1946, he was on a mission in Sweden.

== Purge and rehabilitation ==
In November 1950, Aben was removed from office and arrested. At the hearing of the Military Collegium of the Supreme Court of the USSR on January 17, 1952, Aben was sentenced to 25 years in a correctional labor camp. He served his sentence in the Vorkuta prison camp until September 10, 1955, when his conviction was vacated due to the lack of evidence of a crime.

From July 1957, he worked as a senior inspector of the technical department of the National Economic Council of the Estonian SSR. In the years 1959–1967, he worked as an editor and department head at the Central Bureau of Technical Information of the Estonian SSR, and then until he retired in 1970 as an engineer and editor at the Experimental Complex Unit.

Aleksander Aben died in Tallinn on October 14, 1991, and is buried in the Tallinn Forest Cemetery.
