= Ants Oidermaa =

Estonian politician (1891–1941)

Ants Oidermaa (born Hans Oidermann; 2 December 1891 in Sauga Parish (now Tori Parish), Kreis Pernau – 2 July 1941 in Tallinn) was an Estonian politician, diplomat and newspaper editor.

From 1939 until 1940 he was minister without portfolio, acting as Head of State Propaganda Administration. He was arrested by Soviet occupation authorities in December 1940 in Aegviidu and executed while held in prison in Tallinn.
