= Kustav Kurg =

Estonian politician (1902–1992)

Kustav Aleksander Kurg (born Gustav Aleksander Kurg; 3 March 1902 Kallavere – 27 November 1992 Toronto, Canada) was an Estonian lawyer and politician. He was a member of VI Riigikogu (its Chamber of Deputies).
