= Johannes Nyman =

Estonian politician

Johannes Nyman (28 April 1893 in Harku Parish, Harju County – 19 February 1966 in Stockholm) was an Estonian politician. He was a member of VI Riigikogu (its Chamber of Deputies).
