= Märt Sõrra =

Estonian politician

Märt Sõrra (14 February 1872 Laeva Parish, Tartu County – 22 June 1948 Tähtvere Parish, Tartu County) was an Estonian politician. He was a member of VI Riigikogu (its Chamber of Deputies).
