= Palometsa =

Village in Estonia

- Location within Estonia
- Coordinates: 57°48′35″N 27°05′43″E
- Country: Estonia
- County: Võru County
- Municipality: Võru Parish

Palometsa is a village in Estonia, in Võru Parish, which belongs to Võru County.
