= Ado Roosiorg =

Estonian politician

Ado Roosiorg (3 October 1887 Tarvastu Parish, Viljandi County – 15 August 1942 Karaganda Oblast) was an Estonian agronomist and politician. He was a member of VI Riigikogu (its Chamber of Deputies).
