= Heinrich Lauri =

Estonian politician (1890–1942)

Heinrich Eduard Lauri (11 December 1890 Paasvere Parish, Virumaa – 8 February 1942 Lesnoy, Kirov Oblast) was an Estonian politician. He was a member of VI Riigikogu (its National Council).
