= Mihkel Jüris =

Estonian politician (1907–1997)

Mihkel Jüris (also Mihail Jüris(son); 11 September 1907 Hellamaa Parish, Muhumaa – 22 October 1997 Stockholm) was an Estonian politician. He was a member of VI Riigikogu (its Chamber of Deputies).
