= Eugen Madisoo =

Estonian politician

Eugen Madisoo (1886-1954) was an Estonian politician. He was a member of VI Riigikogu, being Secretary-General of the Chamber of Deputies.
