= Harold M. Koch =

American priest who defected to the Soviet Union

- Born: 1932 (age 93–94)
- Occupation: Roman Catholic priest
- Known for: defected to the Soviet Union in 1966
- Spouse: Jeanette Neager

Harold M. Koch (born 1932) was an American Roman Catholic priest from Chicago who defected to the Soviet Union in 1966. His defection, which was included in a Soviet propaganda broadcast, was in protest to the Vietnam War. However he decided to return to the United States three months later saying he wanted to get married. He did, to Jeanette Neager. While in the Soviet Union he was provided an apartment in Moscow.

From 1958 to 1963 he served the Roman Catholic Archdiocese of Chicago, leaving when pushed out because of psychiatric problems.
