= Jüri Looväli =

Estonian politician

- Born: 3 May 1897; Vastemõisa Parish, Estonia
- Died: 10 July 1963 (aged 66); London, United Kingdom
- Other name: Jüri Land
- Occupation: Politician

Jüri Looväli (also Jüri Land; 3 May 1897 Vastemõisa Parish (now Põhja-Sakala Parish), Kreis Fellin – 10 July 1963 London) was an Estonian politician. He was a member of VI Riigikogu (its Chamber of Deputies). During the German occupation of Estonia, from 1941 until 1944, Looväli served as the governor of Pärnu County within the framework of the Estonian Self-Administration of Generalbezirk Estland. In 1944, as the Red Army was approaching, he went into exile.
