= Otto Pukk =

Estonian politician (1900–1951)

Otto Pukk (29 November 1900 Loona, Saare County – 14 February 1951 Stockholm) was an Estonian politician and lawyer. He was a member of the Estonian National Assembly and III, V and VI Riigikogu.

Since 1939 he was the chairman of VI Riigikogu (Riigivolikogu).
