= Juhan Piirimaa =

Estonian politician

Juhan Piirimaa (born Johannes Preimuth; 9 February 1898 Püssi Parish (now Lüganuse Parish), Kreis Wierland – c. 1942) was an Estonian politician. He was a member of the VI Riigikogu (its Chamber of Deputies). He disappeared following the Soviet invasion of Estonia.
