= Mihkel Pung =

Estonian politician (1876–1941)

Mihkel Pung (19 October [O.S. 7 October] 1876 in Vana-Põltsamaa Parish (now Põltsamaa Parish), Kreis Fellin – 11 October 1941 in Sevurallag, Sverdlovsk Oblast) was an Estonian politician and a former Minister of Foreign Affairs of Estonia and Speaker of the National Council (upper chamber) from 21 April 1938 to 5 July 1940. Pung was Minister of Finance in 1931. He was arrested during the Soviet annexation of Estonia and sent to Sevurallag (Sosva lager), a Soviet gulag in Sverdlovsk Oblast. He died in imprisonment in 1941.

Political offices
Preceded by Office created	Chairman of the Bank of Estonia; 1919	Succeeded by Eduard Aule
Preceded by Jaan Tõnisson	Estonian Minister of Foreign Affairs; 1932	Succeeded by August Rei
Preceded by Office created	Speaker of the National Council; 1938–1940	Succeeded by none
