= Jaan Ruus =

Estonian film critic, film journalist and film editor

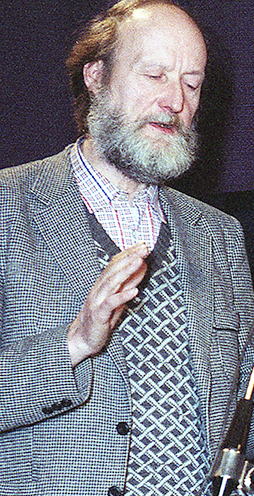
Jaan Ruus

Jaan Ruus (23 November 1938 Tallinn – 30 January 2017) was an Estonian film critic, film journalist and film editor.

1961 he graduated from Tartu State University in economy.

1961-1966 he worked as an editor at Estonian Radio. 1966-1973 he worked at Tallinnfilm, being an editor of documental and animated films. Since 1981 he worked for the magazine Teater. Muusika. Kino.; being 1981-1988 its leader. 1992-2015 he was film editor at the newspaper Eesti Ekspress.

In 1993 he was one of the founders of Estonian Film Journalists' Union, and 1993-1998 and 1999-2015 its chairman.

Awards:

- 2001: Order of the White Star, V class.
