= Jaan Kundla =

Estonian politician (born 1937)

Jaan Kundla (born 11 October 1937 in Suure-Jaani) is an Estonian politician. He was previously an independent member of Riigikogu, formerly (until expulsion) a member of Estonian Centre Party.

He had previously been a member of the People's Party Moderates and the leader of the Estonian Pensioners' Party. Kundla has caught attention by using the Riigikogu member's expense account to buy foodstuffs, including mayonnaise. He became unexpectedly important as a potential swing voter after the Estonian Social Democratic Party left the government, leaving a governing coalition consisting of Estonian Reform Party and Union of Pro Patria and Res Publica. In this structure, the two coalition parties hold 50 of 101 Riigikogu seats — a very narrow minority.
