= Julius Voolaid =

Estonian politician (1900–1966)

Julius Voolaid (born Julius Vollmann; 26 June 1900 – 14 February 1966) was an Estonian politician and pastor of the Estonian Evangelical Lutheran Church. Voolaid was born in Tapa. He was a member of VI Riigikogu (its Chamber of Deputies).
