= Oskar Suursööt =

Estonian politician (1893–1942)

Oskar Albert Suursööt (30 May 1893 – 3 February 1942 Vyatlag labour camp, Kirov oblast, Russia) was an Estonian politician.

1932 he was Minister of Economic Affairs. Arrested by the NKVD on 24 July 1940, was detained in the Gulag prison camp system in Kirov Oblast where he died in custody.
