= August Laur =

Estonian politician (1886–1942)

August Laur (9 October 1886 Vana-Põltsamaa Parish (now Põltsamaa Parish), Kreis Fellin – 8 September 1942 Sosva camp, Sverdlovsk Oblast) was an Estonian politician. He was a member of III, IV and V Riigikogu.

Laur was arrested in 1941 by the NKVD following the Soviet occupation of Estonia. He was executed by gunshot in prison custody in Sverdlovsk Oblast.
