= Jaan Põdra =

Estonian politician

Jaan Põdra (29 May 1894 Kabala Parish, Viljandi County – 4 February 1942 Vyatka prison camp, Kirov Oblast) was an Estonian politician. He was a member of VI Riigikogu (its Chamber of Deputies).

Following the Soviet occupation of Estonia in 1940, Põdra was arrested by the NKVD on 28 January 1941. On 12 December 1941, he was sentenced to death. The sentence was carried out by gunshot at Vyatka prison camp in Kirov Oblast, Russian Soviet Federative Socialist Republic on 4 February 1942.
