= Jaan Murro =

Estonian politician (1903–1969)

Jaan Murro (born 21 June 1903 in Alu – 28 August 1969) was an Estonian editor, journalist and politician. He was a member of VI Riigikogu (its Chamber of Deputies).
