= Aleksander Saar =

Estonian politician (1883–1942)

Aleksander Saar (23 July 1883 Lustivere Parish (now Põltsamaa Parish), Kreis Fellin – 1 August 1942 Kirov, Russian SFSR) was an Estonian politician. He was a member of I Riigikogu.
