= Oskar Lõvi (journalist) =

Estonian journalist and politician

Oskar Lõvi (6 February 1903 Tallinn – 2 September 1942 Sverdlovsk, Russia) was an Estonian journalist and politician. He was a member of VI Riigikogu (its Chamber of Deputies).
