= Aleksander Ossipov =

Estonian politician (1890–1941)

Aleksander Ossipov (26 August 1890 – 21 December 1941 Kirov, Russia) was an Estonian politician. He was a member of V Riigikogu.
