= Georgi Orlov =

Russian-Estonian politician (1884–1941)

- Георгий Орлов

Member of the Riigikogu
- In office 1938–1940

Personal details
- Born: 28 April 1884 Saint Petersburg, Russian Empire
- Died: 15 October 1941 (aged 57) Sosva, Russian Soviet Federative Socialist Republic, Soviet Union
- Education: University of Tartu
- Occupation: Politician
- Profession: Physicist

Georgi Ivanovich Orlov (Russian: Георгий Иванович Орлов; 28 April 1884 – 15 October 1941) was a Russian-Estonian physician and politician who was a member of the Riigikogu from 1938 to 1940.

== Biography ==
Orlov was born in Saint Petersburg as the son of a Russian Orthodox priest. His father Ivan Orlov was a priest in Irkutsk. He acquired his secondary education from Pskov's Gymnasium. He later graduated from the Orthodox Clinical Seminary and entered the Faculty of Medicine of the University of Tartu, graduating in 1911 with a doctoral degree.

He participated in both World War I and the Estonian War of Independence as a member of the Northwestern Army. In the 1920s, he worked as a physician in Lavry, Petseri County. In Petseri County, Orlov was active in the work of Russian educational and cultural societies.

From 1938 to 1940, he was a member of the Riigikogu.

Orlov was arrested by the NKVD with his wife on 14 June 1941 and was taken to Sevurallag, Sverdlovsk Oblast, where he died during criminal investigations. Orlov's wife, Veera, was arrested and deported to Siberia on 14 June 1941, and died in 1942 in Rechka Panya, Tomsk Oblast.

His youngest son, Igor (1917–1944), was mobilized into the Red Army in 1941, where he served in a sanatorium. He died during the Battle of Tehumardi on 10 October 1944. He is buried at Tehumardi Russian Cemetery.
