= Patriotic League (Estonia) =

Estonian political movement 1935–1940

Patriotic League Isamaaliit
- Founded: 1935; 91 years ago
- Dissolved: 1940; 86 years ago
- Headquarters: Tallinn, Estonia
- Ideology: Estonian nationalism Corporatism; Authoritarian conservatism Anti-communism
- Political position: Right-wing to far-right

The Patriotic League (Estonian: Isamaaliit) was a political movement founded in 1935 in Estonia, and thereafter, until 1940, the only legal political quasi-party, as the activities of any political party were suspended in the country during that time.

== History ==
After Konstantin Päts's self-coup in 1934, the activities of all political parties – including Päts's own Union of Settlers and Smallholders – were suspended. The Patriotic League was established on 9 March 1935 as the political movement of the establishment, with the opposition parties' activities remaining suspended.

Elections for a National Assembly to draft a new constitution for Estonia were held in 1936. The Patriotic League's individual candidates won in 50 of the 80 constituencies (seats) in the elections where only individual candidates could participate.

Prior to the 1938 parliamentary elections the Patriotic League formed the National Front for the Implementation of the Constitution to run in the election, although the Front was effectively the same organisation.
