= Vladimir Roslavlev =

Estonian politician

Vladimir Roslavlev (26 March 1880 Kharkiv – 1945 Germany) was an Estonian lawyer, economist and politician.

He wrote an explanation of the Stamp Tax Act with Rudolf Grünthal in 1929. He was a member of the Rahvuskogu and the Riigikogu from 1938 to 1940, in the Riigivolikogu branch, representing a number of parishes in Petseri County.

He was later executed in 1945 by the Soviet Union.
