= Võru kreis =

Uyezd of Russian Empire

Werro County: Верроскій уѣздъ
- Uezd
- Location in the Governorate of Livonia
- Country: Russian Empire
- Governorate: Livonia
- Established: 1745
- Abolished: 1920
- Capital: Werro

Area
  - Total: 4,261.13 km^{2} (1,645.23 sq mi)

Population (1897)
  - Total: 97,185
  - Density: 22.807/km^{2} (59.071/sq mi)

Werro County (German: Kreis Werro, Estonian: Võru kreis, Russian: Верроскій уѣздъ, romanized: Verroskiy uyezd) was one of the nine subdivisions of the Governorate of Livonia of the Russian Empire. It was situated in the northeastern part of the governorate (in present-day southeastern Estonia). Its capital was Võru (Werro). The territory of Kreis Werro corresponds to the present-day Võru County, most of Põlva County and parts of Valga County.

== Demographics ==
At the time of the Russian Empire Census of 1897, Kreis Werro had a population of 97,185. Of these, 92.7% spoke Estonian, 3.4% Latvian, 2.0% German, 1.4% Russian and 0.3% Yiddish as their native language.
