= Jaan Kokk =

Estonian politician

Jaan Kokk (20 December 1903 Mõniste Parish, Võru County – 10 April 1942 Sverdlovsk Prison, Russia) was an Estonian politician. He was a member of VI Riigikogu (its Chamber of Deputies).
