= Ado Anderkopp =

Estonian politician (1894–1941)

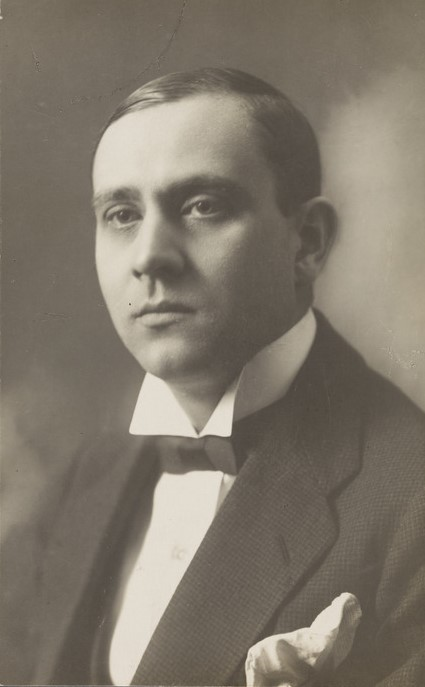
Ado Anderkopp

Ado Anderkopp (also Ado Anderkop; 18 January 1894, in Hanila – 30 June 1941 in Tallinn) was an Estonian politician, journalist and sports organiser. He was a member of the I, II, III, IV, and V Riigikogu.

Following the Soviet occupation of Estonia in 1940, Anderkopp was arrested on 22 July 1940. He was executed in prison in Tallinn on 30 June 1941.

Political offices:

- 1923–1924: Minister of War
- 1930–1933: Minister of the Interior and Minister of Justice
