= Harrien County =

Uyezd in Estonia Governorate, Russian Empire

Coordinates: 59°20′N 24°42′E

Harrien County Ревельскій уѣздъ
- Uezd
- Coat of arms

- Location in the Governorate of Estonia
- Country: Russian Empire
- Governorate: Estonia
- Established: 1745
- Abolished: 1920
- Capital: Reval

Area
  - Total: 5,713 km^{2} (2,206 sq mi)

Population (1897)
  - Total: 157,736
  - Density: 27.61/km^{2} (71.51/sq mi)

Harrien County (German: Kreis Harrien or Kreis Reval, Estonian: Harju kreis, Russian: Ревельскій/Гарріенскій уѣздъ, romanized: Revelskiy/Garrienskiy uyezd) was one of the four counties of the Governorate of Estonia. It was situated in the central part of the governorate (in present-day northern Estonia). Its capital was Reval (Tallinn), which was the capital of the governorate as well. The territory of Harrien County corresponds to present-day Harju County and most parts of Rapla County.

== Demographics ==
At the time of the Russian Empire Census of 1897, Harrien County had a population of 157,736. Of these, 82.9% spoke Estonian, 7.3% German, 6.8% Russian, 0.7% Swedish, 0.7% Yiddish, 0.7% Polish, 0.2% Latvian, 0.2% Finnish, 0.1% Belarusian and 0.1% Ukrainian as their native language.
