= Pärnu kreis =

Uyezd of Russian Empire

Kreis Pernau Pärnu kreis
- Kreis
- Location in the Governorate of Livonia
- Country: Russian Empire
- Governorate: Livonia
- Established: 1745
- Abolished: 1920
- Capital: Pernau

Area
  - Total: 5,343.08 km^{2} (2,062.97 sq mi)

Population (1897)
  - Total: 98,123
  - Density: 18.365/km^{2} (47.564/sq mi)

The Kreis Pernau (English: Pärnu County; Estonian: Pärnu kreis, Russian: Перновскій уѣздъ, romanized: Pernovskiy uyezd) was one of the nine subdivisions of the Governorate of Livonia of the Russian Empire. It was situated in the northwestern part of the governorate (in present-day southwestern Estonia). The territory of Kreis Pernau corresponds to most of the present-day Pärnu County and parts of Viljandi and Rapla counties.

== Demographics ==
At the time of the Russian Empire Census of 1897, Kreis Pernau had a population of 98,123. Of these, 94.0% spoke Estonian, 3.7% German, 1.1% Russian, 0.7% Latvian, 0.4% Yiddish and 0.1% Polish as their native language.
