= Tartu kreis =

Uyezd of Russian Empire

Tartu kreis (German: Kreis Dorpat; Russian: Дерптский уезд, romanized: Derptskiy uyezd, 1893–1918: Юрьевский уезд, romanized: Yur'yevskiy uyezd) was one of the nine subdivisions of the Governorate of Livonia of the Russian Empire. It was situated in the northeastern part of the governorate (in present-day eastern Estonia). Its capital was Tartu (Dorpat). The territory of Kreis Dorpat corresponds to the present-day Tartu County, most of Jõgeva County, parts of Põlva and Valga counties and a small part of Ida-Viru County.

== Demographics ==
At the time of the Russian Empire Census of 1897, Kreis Dorpat had a population of 190,317. Of these, 86.8% spoke Estonian, 7.2% Russian, 4.4% German, 0.8% Yiddish, 0.4% Latvian and 0.3% Polish as their native language.
