= Perm Oblast =

Former federal subject of Russia

Coordinates: 58°0′50″N 56°14′56″E

Perm Oblast Пе́рмская о́бласть (Russian)
- Former subdivision of Russia
- 1938–2005
- Flag

  - Type: Oblast
- History
  - Established: 1938
  - Disestablished: 1 December 2005
Preceded by	Succeeded by
Sverdlovsk Oblast	Perm Krai

Until 1 December 2005, Perm Oblast (Russian: Пе́рмская о́бласть) was a federal subject of Russia (an oblast) in Privolzhsky (Volga) Federal District. According to the results of the referendum held in October 2004, Perm Oblast was merged with Komi-Permyak Autonomous Okrug to form Perm Krai.

It was established in 1938 as part of the RSFSR. From 1940 to 1957 it was named Molotov Oblast in honor of Vyacheslav Molotov. The oblast was named after its administrative center, the city of Perm. The oblast covered an area of 160,600 km^{2}, and as of the 2002 census its population was 2,819,421. Before the merger, neighboring oblasts and republics were (from north clockwise) Komi Republic, Sverdlovsk Oblast, Republic of Bashkortostan, Udmurt Republic, and Kirov Oblast.

== Geography ==
=== Time zone ===
Perm Oblast was located in the Yekaterinburg Time Zone (YEKT/YEKST). UTC offset is +0500 (YEKT)/+0600 (YEKST).
