= 6th Riigikogu =

Parliament of Estonia 1938–1940

The 6th Riigikogu was the sixth legislature of the Estonian Parliament (Riigikogu). The legislature was elected after the 1938 elections (held on 24–25 February 1938). It sat between 7 April 1938 and 5 July 1940, after which the Soviet Union occupied Estonia for the first time. Estonia's previous unicameral parliamentary system had been suspended in 1934 and formally dissolved in 1937; on 1 January 1938, the country's Third Constitution came into force, creating a bicameral National Assembly, consisting of the Chamber of Deputies (Riigivolikogu) and the National Council (Riiginõukogu). These were de facto dissolved when the Soviet Union occupied Estonia and established the Supreme Soviet of the Estonian Soviet Socialist Republic.

== The Chamber of Deputies (Riigivolikogu) ==
=== Officers ===
The following is a list of the Riigivolikogu officers during the Riigikogu's sixth legislative session:

==== Chairman ====
- Jüri Uluots, 21 April 1938 – 12 October 1939
- Otto Pukk, from 17 October 1939

==== First Assistant Chairman ====
- Ado Anderkopp, from 21 April 1938

==== Second Assistant Chairman ====
- Otto Pukk, 21 April 1938 – 17 October 1939
- Rudolf Penno, from 17 October 1939

==== Secretary-General ====
- Eugen Madisoo

==== Secretary ====
- Peeter Malvet

== The National Council (Riiginõukogu) ==
=== Officers ===
The following is a list of the Riiginõukogu officers during the Riigikogu's sixth legislative session:

==== Chairman ====
- Mihkel Pung

==== Assistant Chairmen ====
- Alfred Maurer
- Heinrich Lauri

==== Secretary-General ====
- Artur Mägi

==== Secretary ====
- Herman Soone
