= Estonian Students' Society =

Estonian youth organization

- EÜS
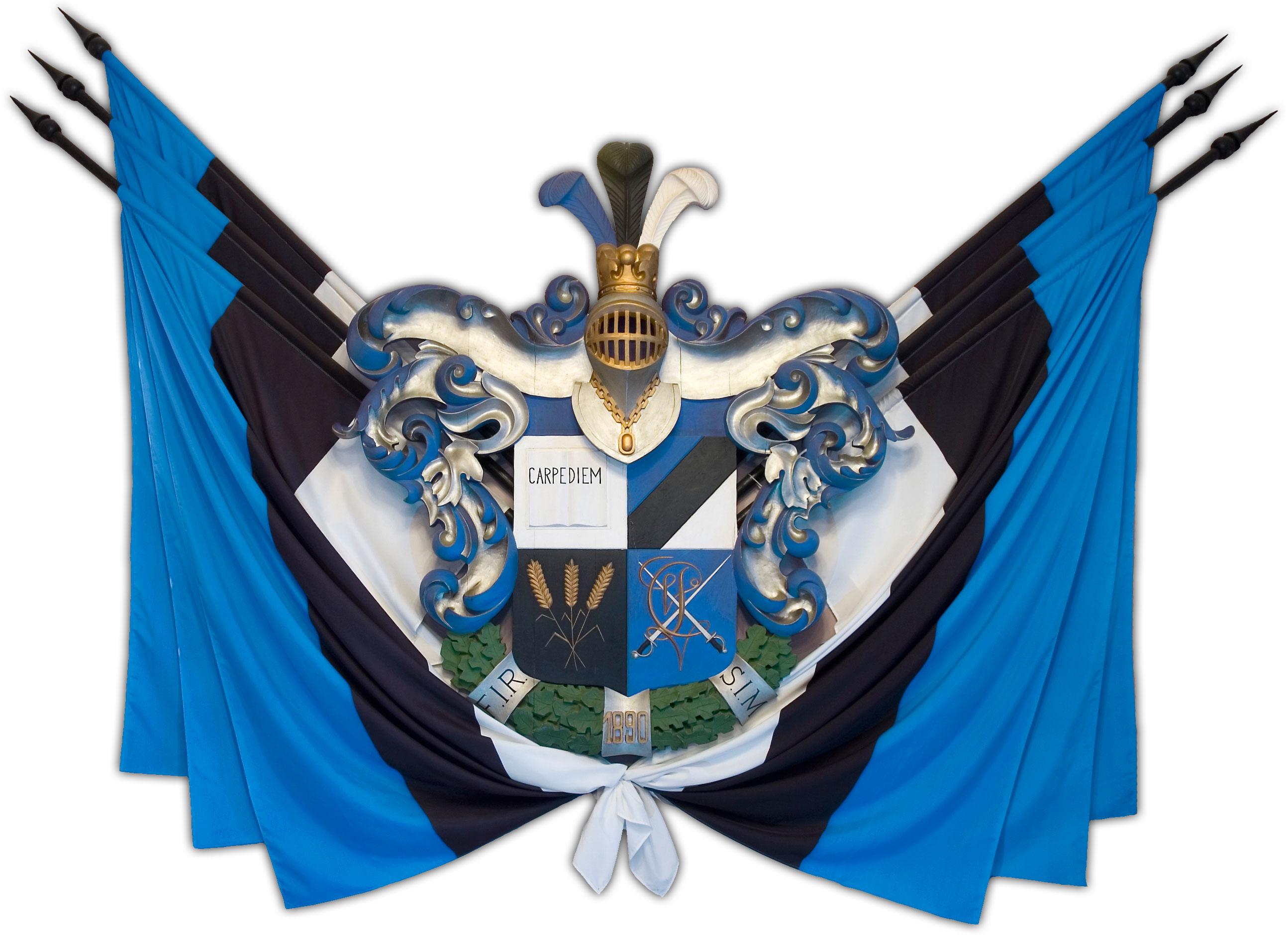
- Founded: 7 April 1870; 156 years ago University of Tartu
- Type: Estonian Student Society
- Affiliation: Independent
- Status: Active
- Scope: International
- Motto: Fortiter in re suaviter in modo "Gentle in manner, resolute in execution"
- Colors: Blue, Black and White
- Flag
- Publication: EÜSi Album
- Philanthropy: Artur Puksov Foundation
- Chapters: 8 (active)
- Headquarters: Tõnissoni 1 Tartu, Tartumaa; Estonia
- Website: www.eys.ee

The Estonian Students' Society (Estonian: Eesti Üliõpilaste Selts; commonly used acronym: EÜS) is the largest and oldest all-male academical student society in Estonia, and is similar to the Baltic German student organizations known as corporations (Corps) (not to be confused with US college fraternities). It was founded in 1870 at Tartu. It has over 900 members in Estonia and abroad.

In 1881 the Society adopted blue, black and white as its colours. Its first flag was made in 1884 and this tricolour was later (1918) accepted as the National Flag of Estonia. The original flag is still in existence.

In the wake of the Estonian national awakening, many young Estonian intellectuals had ties to the EÜS, and the organization had impact beyond its borders. It was instrumental in the founding of the Estonian National Museum in 1909, and the EÜS library was donated to the museum. The Museum was later split into two, and its Archive Library formed the basis of the Estonian Literary Museum.

The building of the Estonian Students' Society in Tartu has been considered to be one of the first examples of Estonian national architecture. The Treaty of Tartu between Finland and Soviet Russia was signed in the building in 1920.

Former members of the EÜS founded the academic corporations Fraternitas Estica (1907), Sakala (1909) and the association Veljesto.

== History ==
=== Founding ===
The Estonian Students' Society was founded on 7 April 1870 (26 March 1870 according to the old calendar) by five undergraduate students and three Estonian intellectuals: Wilhelm Eisenschmidt, Jakob Hurt, Johann Voldemar Jannsen, Andreas Kurrikoff, Heinrich Rosenthal, Gustav Treffner, Hugo Treffner, and Martin Wühner.

They gathered to read the Estonian national epic Kalevipoeg in the first "Kalevipoeg evening" and decided to continue gatherings in the same form. This decision led to the founding of the Estonian Students' Society, which became the first ethnic Estonian student fraternity.

=== The 1880s ===
In 1882 the society tried to establish itself as the corporation Vironia, following the model of Baltic German student corporations, but this was rejected by the other corporations. The name Estonian Students' Society came into use in 1883, when the organisation was registered with the University of Tartu as an academic-cultural society; this was the society's first legal registration. In 1889, the society began to publish journals (Est: albumid), consisting of scientific articles, essays and belletristic texts.

=== Fraternitas Viliensis (1890) ===
In 1890, the fraternity tried to establish itself as the corporation Fraternitas Viliensis, and this was accepted. Its establishment was however stopped by the Russian official Nikolai Lavrovski, head of the Riga Educational District. This was the last main attempt to establish the Estonian Students' Society as a corporation. Later attempts ended with membership splits and the founding of the corporations Fraternitas Estica (1907) and Sakala (1909), formed in frank imitation of the Baltic German corporations.

=== Early 20th century ===
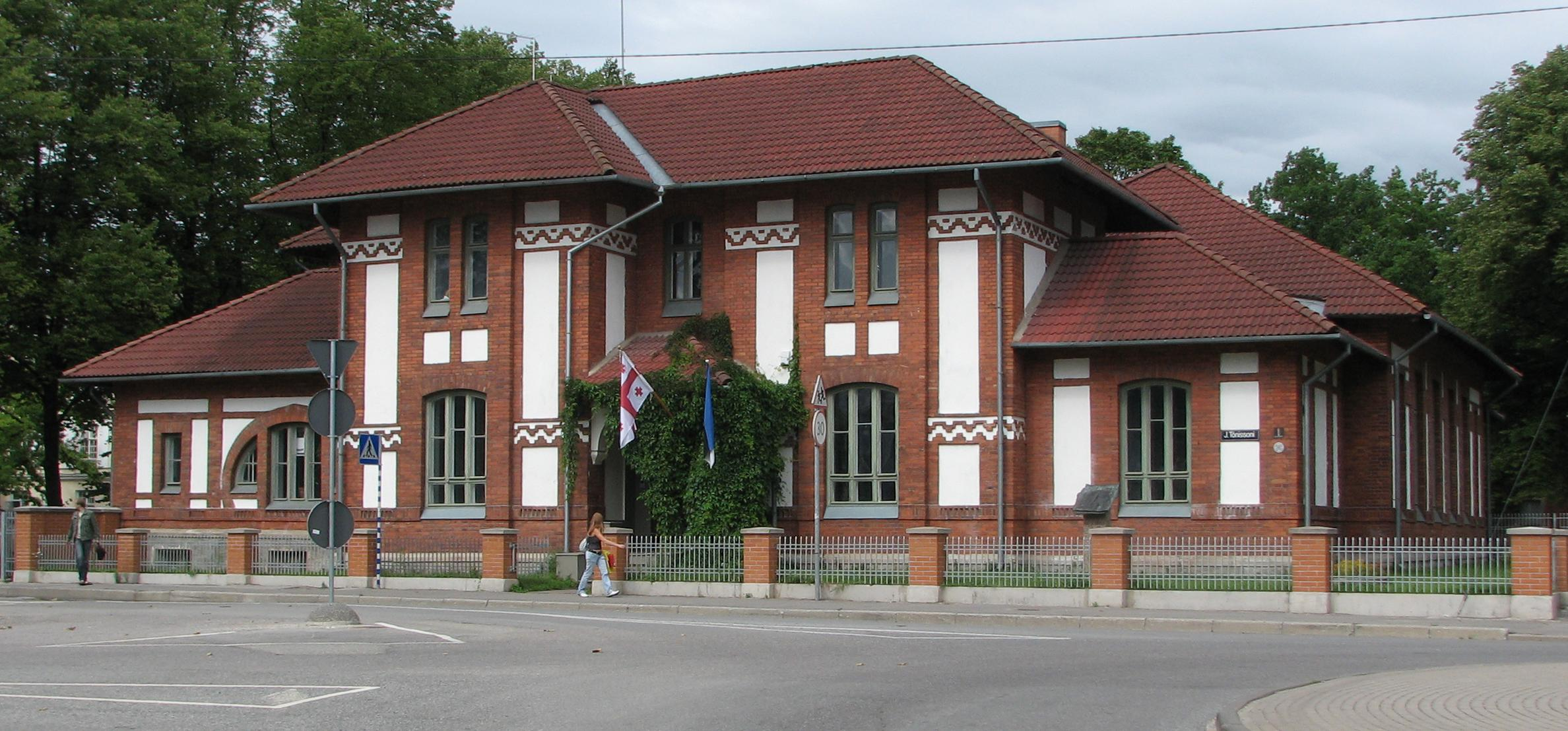
Building of the Estonian Students' Society

A new building was completed in 1902, designed by Georg Hellat, one of the first professional Estonian architects, who borrowed from art deco and national romanticist styles. The dedication ceremony took place on 10–11 September 1902.

The organisation and its traditions were modelled after Baltic German corporations, but the beginning of the 20th century was a time of change. Some traditions like compulsory fencing lessons were abandoned in September 1904. The Estonian Students' Society also made membership voluntary, following the Baltic German corporations' general code of conduct (Allgemeiner Comment).

On 24 November 1918 the Estonian Students' Society decided to join in corpore the Estonian military forces to fight in the Estonian War of Independence. Thirteen members died and 63 students and alumni were awarded the Cross of Liberty. In 1925 Johan Kõpp's Eesti Üliõpilaste Seltsi ajalugu I.1870–1905 (History of the Estonian Students' Society I.1870–1905) was published. The building was enlarged in 1930 following the design of architect Artur Kirsipuu.

== Symbols ==
The fraternity's motto is Fortiter in re suaviter in modo or "Gentle in manner, resolute in execution".

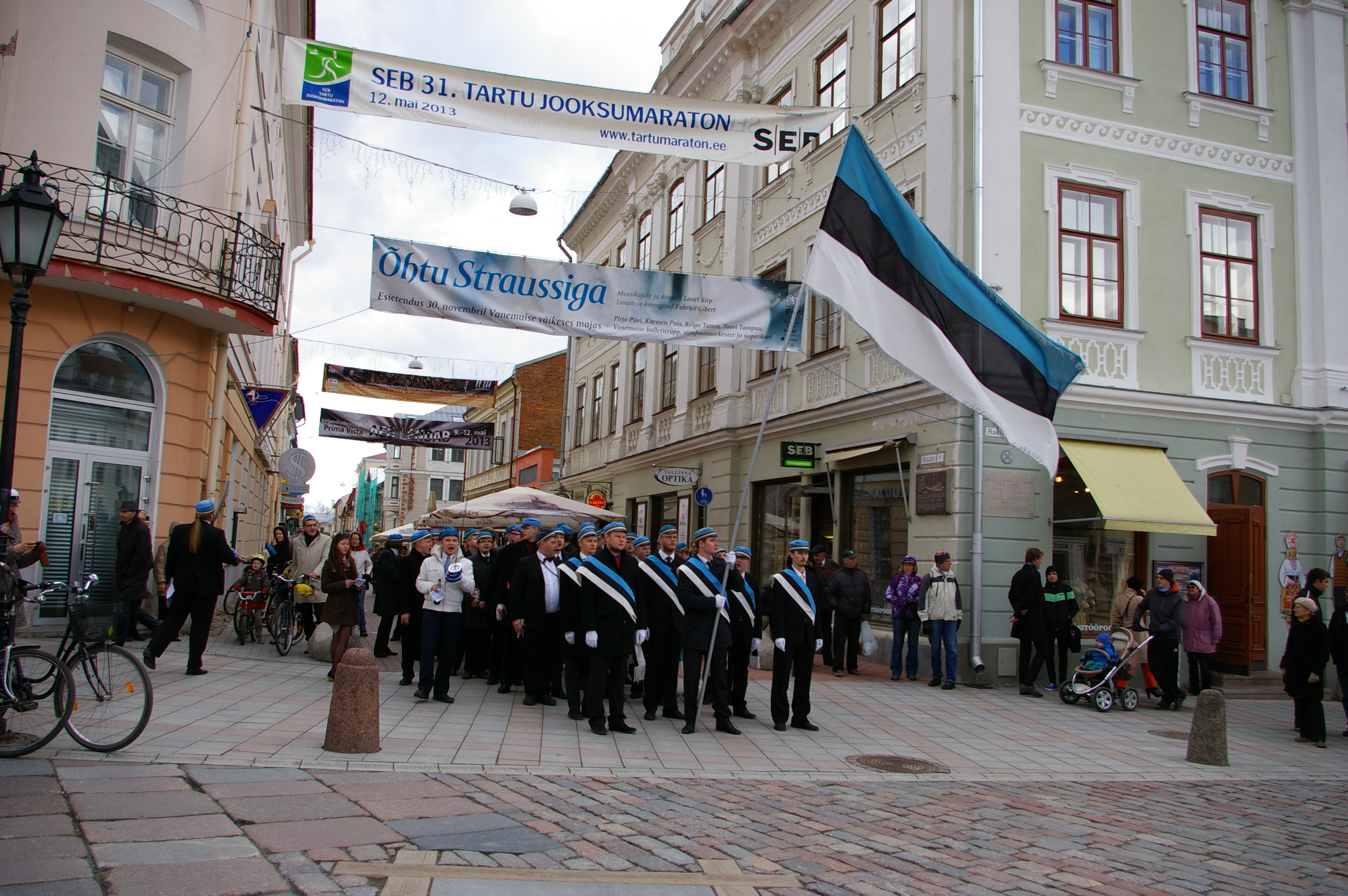
Members of EÜS with their flag in 2013

=== Flag ===
In 1881, the fraternity decided to adopt blue, black, and white as its colours. The first blue-black-white flag was made in the spring of 1884. Since this flag were banned in Tartu, the flag was blessed on 4 June 1884 in Otepää.

The flag achieved national importance at the beginning of the 20th century: the provisional Government of the Republic of Estonia declared the blue-black-white tricolour the official Estonian National Flag on 21 November 1918. This decision, although not formally recorded in "Riigi Teataja" (the State Gazette), was the first time the tricolour flag was associated with the Estonian nation.

The original flag is still in possession of the Estonian Students' Society and is preserved in the Estonian National Museum. The flag was publicly displayed at the Church of Otepää during the 120th anniversary of the flag's blessing in June 2004, and during the 90th Anniversary of the Republic of Estonia at St. Elizabeth's Church in Pärnu in February 2008.

=== Coat of Arms ===
The present coat of arms was developed in 1890, when the fraternity tried to establish itself as Corporation Fraternitas Viliensis. It consists of three flags on each side, a knight's helmet, a shield and an oak corona. There is a white open book on the upper left field of the shield. The book's title is Carpe diem, meaning "Seize the day", the guiding principle of the fraternity. The motto, however, is Fortiter in re suaviter in modo, meaning "Gentle in manner, resolute in execution." It is written as the acronyms "F.I.R" on the left and "S.I.M." on right side of the corona.

== Historical ties ==
The Estonian Students Society has partnership agreements with four foreign student organisations. In 1928, the Estonian Students Society concluded an agreement with the Finnish student nations Etelä-Pohjalainen Osakunta and Pohjois-Pohjalainen Osakunta of the University of Helsinki, the first agreement concluded between Estonian and Finnish student organisations.

In 1937, an agreement with the student society Austrums of the University of Riga, Latvia, followed. In 1991, a further agreement was concluded with the Finnish-Swedish Vasa nation of the University of Helsinki. The Estonian Students Society and its Finnish partner organisations exchange visiting students.

== Structure ==
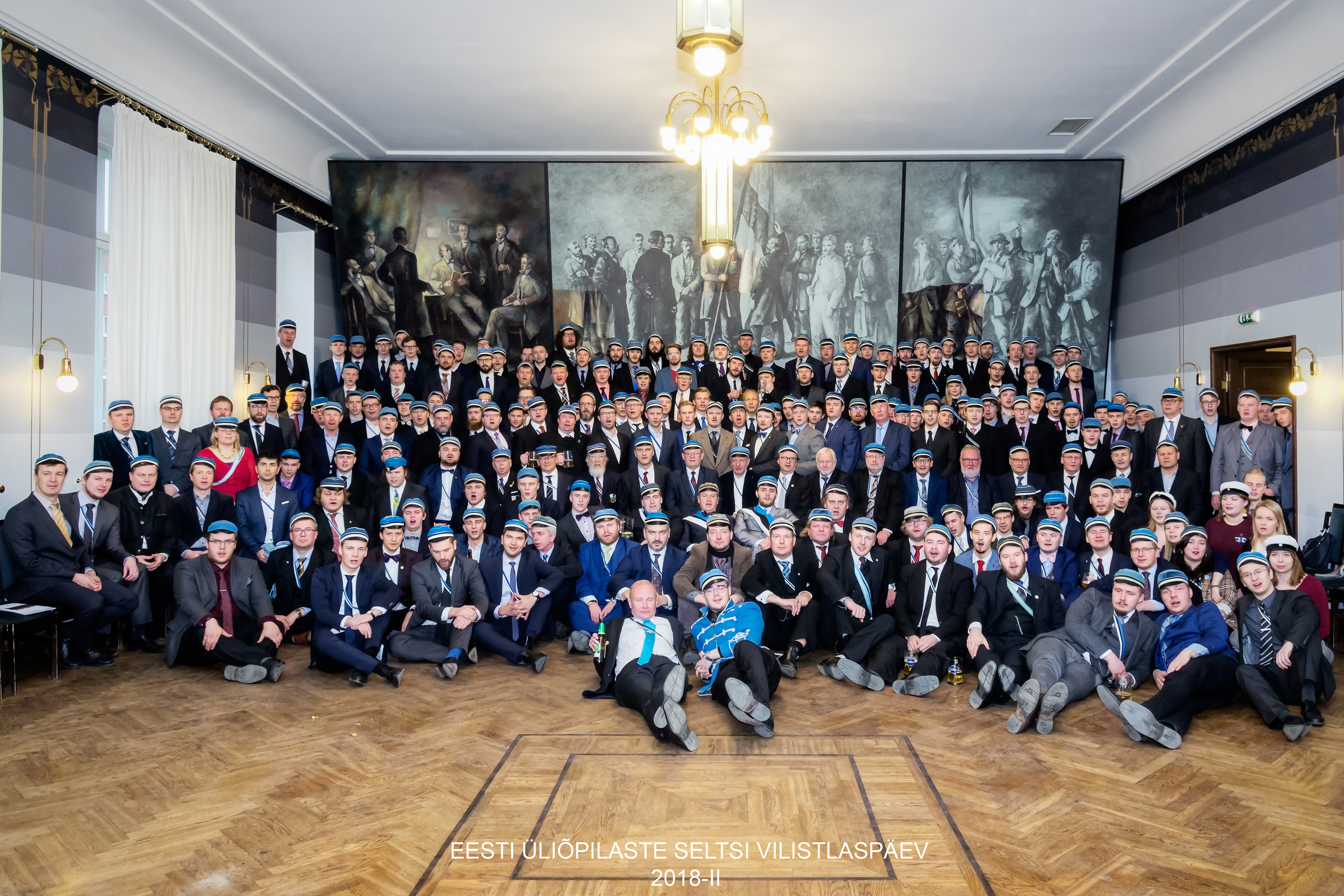
Members of EÜS in 2018

The organisation consists of two legal bodies:

- Estonian Students' Society, founded in 1870 and registered with the University of Tartu on 30 December 1988, and with the Tartu Municipal Government
- Alumni Association of the Estonian Students' Society, founded in 1884 and registered pursuant to the Non-profit Associations Act of the Republic of Estonia on 8 March 1995 (Reg. no 80055073).

== Chapters ==
Up to 1936, all members of the Estonian Students Society were without exception students of the University of Tartu. From 1936, students of Tallinn University of Technology were also accepted. This led to the founding of the Tallinn chapter for undergraduates. An alumni chapter in Tallinn was established in 1921. Beginning in 1945, various chapters of the Estonian Students Society were formed abroad by expatriate members in Sweden, Germany, Australia, the United Kingdom, Canada, the United States, and Argentina.

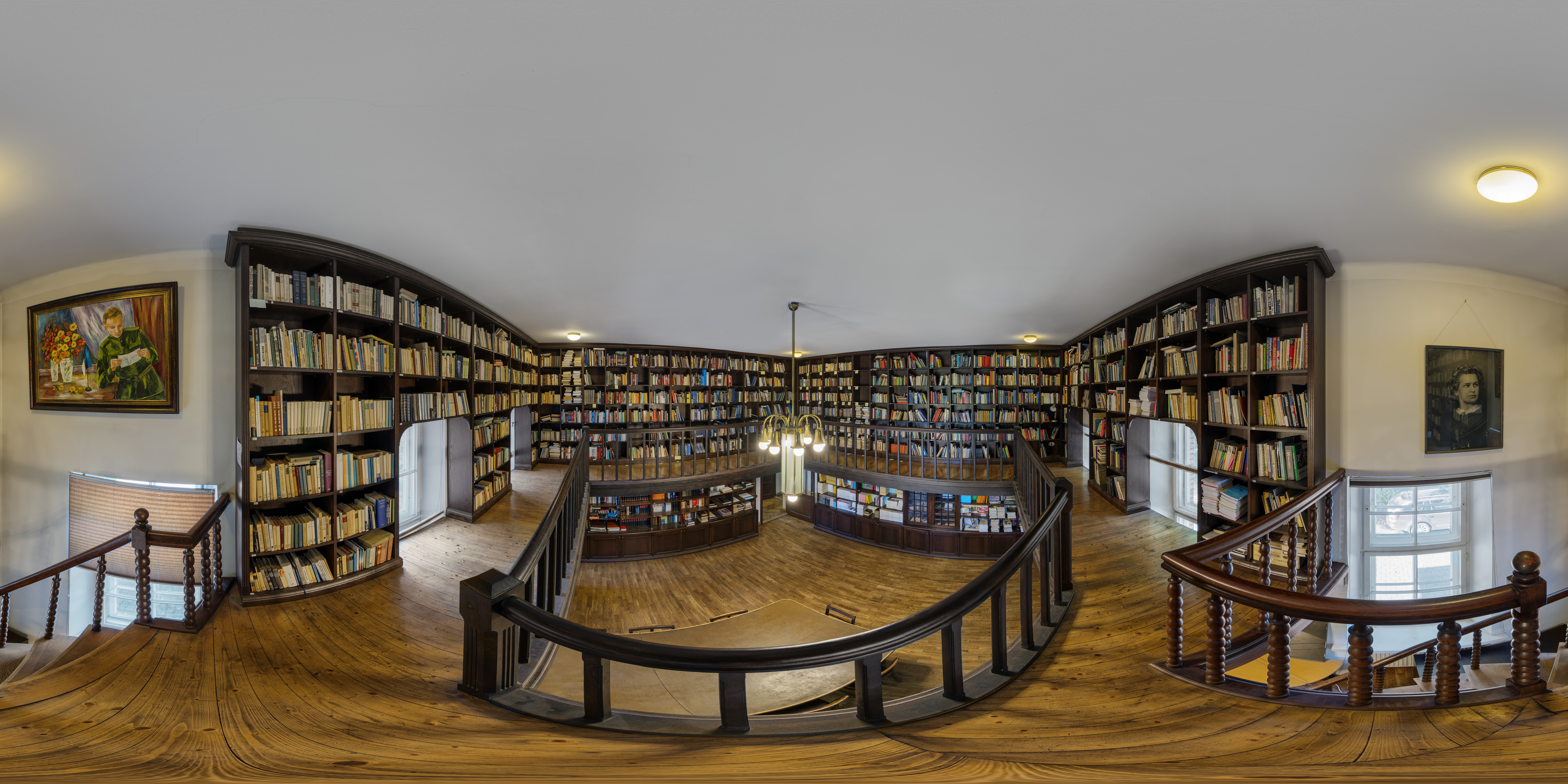
360° view of the library of the Estonian Students' Society, Tartu

The currently-active chapters are:

- Tallinn Chapter
- Pärnu Chapter
- Baltimore-Washington Chapter
- California Chapter
- Gothenburg Chapter
- Stockholm Chapter
- Toronto Chapter
- Brussels Chapter

Chapters of the Estonian Students Society overseas accept students from different universities and higher educational institutions.

== Notable members ==
=== Honorary ===
Following is a list of honorary members:

- Matthias Johann Eisen, folklorist
- Karl August Hermann, journalist and composer
- Jakob Hurt, ethnologist, folklorist, and linguist
- Oskar Kallas, diplomat, linguist and folklorist
- Andres Koern, entrepreneur
- Johan Kõpp, archbishop
- Henrik Koppel, medical scientist
- Jaan Kross, writer
- Mart Laar, Prime Minister of Estonia
- Aadu Lüüs, medical scientist
- Johan Müller, Estonian Minister of Justice and Internal Affairs
- Ferdinand Peterson, engineer and politician
- Villem Raam, art historian
- Gustav Ränk, ethnologist
- Heinrich Rosenthal, writer
- Vello Salo, cleric, essayist, and translator
- Enn Sarv, Estonian freedom fighter
- Gustav Suits, poet
- Harald Tammur, clergyman
- Jaan Tõnisson, Prime Minister of Estonia, State Elder, and Foreign Minister of Estonia
- August Torma, Estonian politician and diplomat

== See also ==
- List of fraternities and sororities in Estonia
