= Filiae Patriae =

Estonian sorority

- C!FP
- Founded: October 27, 1920; 105 years ago University of Tartu
- Type: Estonian sorority
- Affiliation: Independent
- Status: Active
- Scope: International
- Motto: Eesti tütar, eesti kodu tugevasti seotud olgu! "Estonian daughter and Estonian home, be strongly connected!"
- Colors: White, Red and Green
- Flag
- Headquarters: W. Struve 4 Tartu 51003; Estonia
- Website: www.cfp.ee

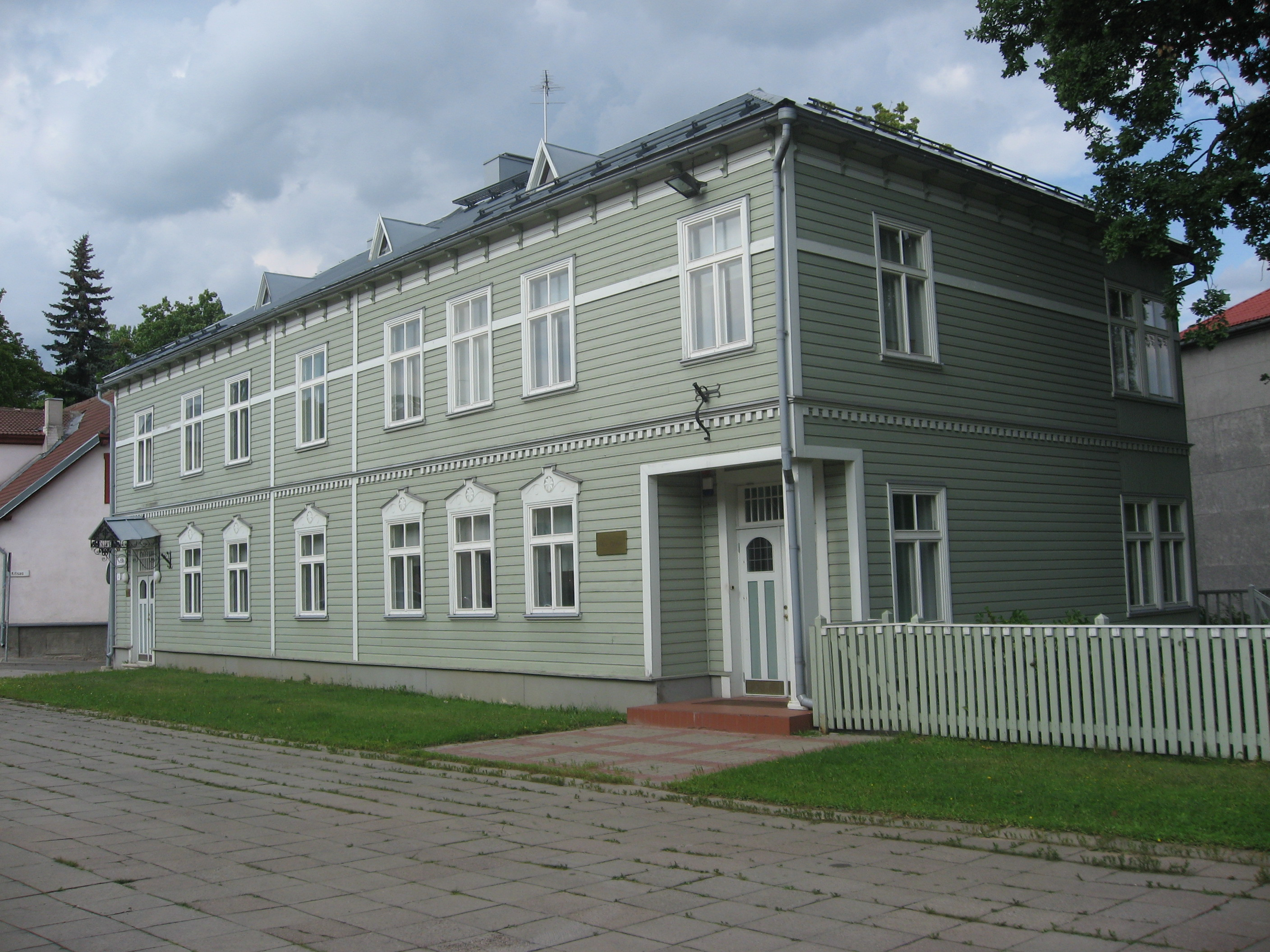
Sorority house since 2000, opposite University of Tartu's library

Filiae Patriae (also Korporatsioon Filiae Patriae or korp! Filiae Patriae, abbreviated C!FP) is an Estonian sorority for women. It was formed in 1920 at the University of Tartu. It is the oldest sorority in Estonia.

== History ==
Korporatsioon Filiae Patriae was founded on 27 October 1920 at the University of Tartu in Tartu, Estonia. Its purpose was to bring together female students to value the Estonian language and culture and to develop them physically and mentally. Its founders were Erika Haller, Hella Jürgenstein, Marta Jürgenstein, Miili Kirschbaum, Erna Kutsar, Alma Mitt, Selma Mitt, Johanna Raig, Elsa Sepp, and Saima Vares.

By 1940, the sorority had initiated 380 members. That year, Estonia was incorporated into the Soviet Union which closed all student organizations. Twenty of Filie Patrae were arrested and were taken to Siberia.

Its 200 members who left Estonia reunited and founded chapters in Australia, Brazil, Canada, Sweden, and the United States. The United States chapter was the first to be formed abroad, on November 28, 1950. At its height in the 1950s and 1960s, the international chapters grew to over 600 members, with more than 200 in the United States.

During the 1970s, the sorority began reforming in Estonia. When Estonia regained its independence from the Soviet Union, the sorority was reestablished on February 17, 1989. Its house is at W. Struve 4 in Tartu, Estonia. It is the oldest sorority in Estonia.

Filiae Patriae has friendship treaties with several overseas fraternities, such as the Hämäläis-Osakunta and Nylands Nation of the University of Helsinki, as well as Gästrike-Hälsinge nation of Uppsala University.

== Symbols ==
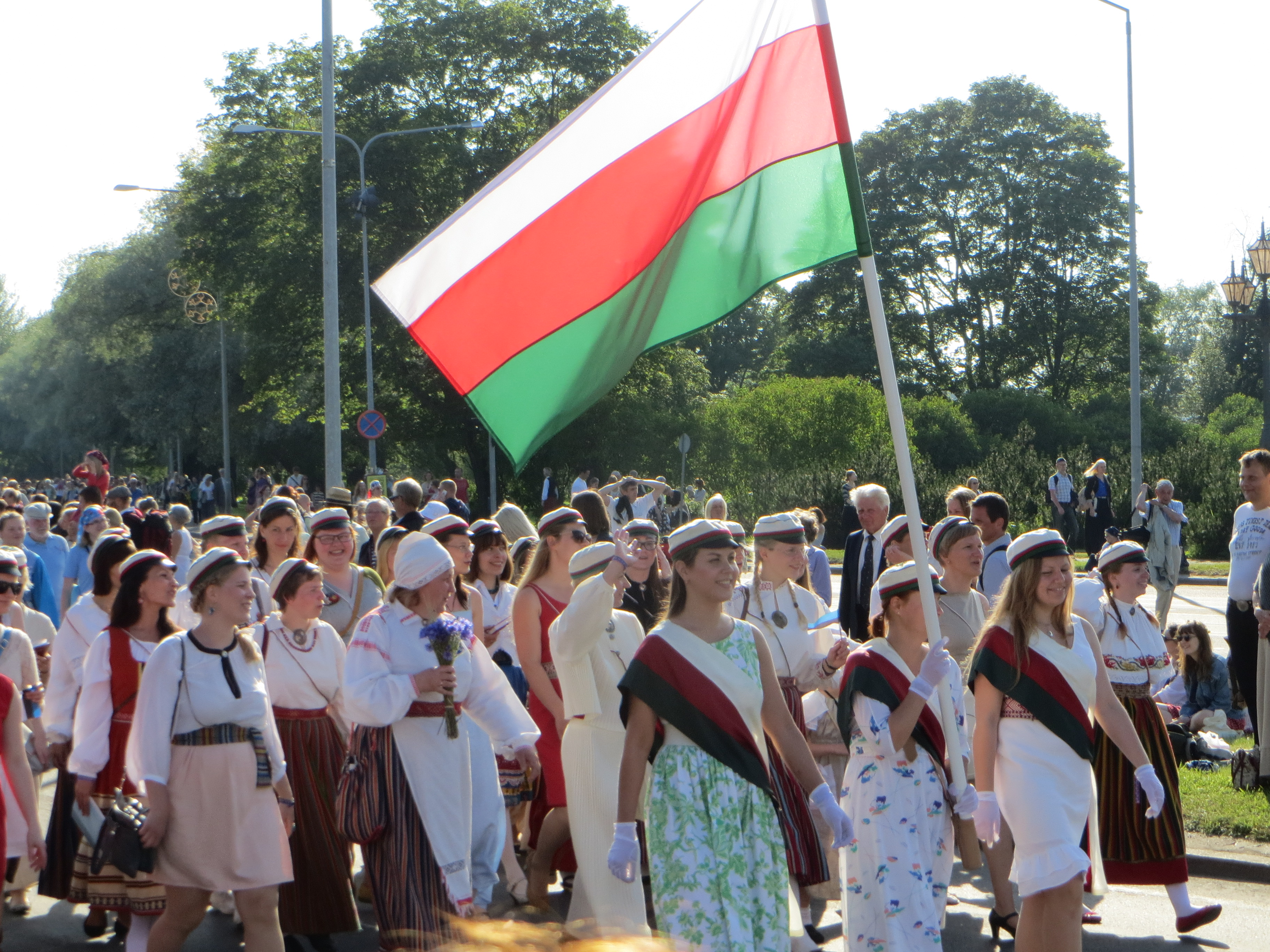
Sorority's members at the Estonian Song Festival, 2014

The name Filiae Patriae translates as "Daughters of the Fatherland". Filiae Patriae's flag song or mission is Eesti tütar, eesti kodu tugevasti seotud olgu! or "Estonian daughter and Estonian home, be strongly connected!" It was adopted in 1924.

The sorority's colors of white, red, and green were selected by founding member Saima Vares. White represents the purity of the Estonian women, education, and Estonia's northern snow fields. Red was chosen to represent the fire of youth, patriotic love, and the dawn sky. Green symbolizes Estonia's forests and meadows and the hope for a better future.

Members wear a white, red, and green ribbon. Its white cap featured a green stylized snowflake. Its flag is white, red, and green.

== Chapters ==
Chapter	Charter date and range	Institution	Location	Status	Ref.
Estonia	October 27, 1920 – 1940; February 7, 1989	University of Tartu	Tartu, Estonia	Active	
Australia			Australia	Inactive	
Brazil			Brazil	Inactive	
Canada			Toronto, Canada	Active	
Sweden			Sweden	Inactive	
United States	November 28, 1950		New York City, New York	Active	

== See also ==
- League of Estonian Corporations
- List of fraternities and sororities in Estonia
