= Endel Laas =

Estonian forest scientist

Endel Laas (29 August 1915 in Tartu – 1 November 2009) was an Estonian forest scientist and professor.

Laas specialised in forestry and taught at the University of Life Sciences for many years. In 1999 he was awarded the Order of the White Star, third class.

== Life and career ==
Endel Laas was born on 29 August 1915 in Tartu as the ninth child in the family. His father had earlier been a coachman, but at that time he served as the tea house and restaurant keeper. 1916−1924 the family lived in Kvissental near Tartu, but from 1930 inside Tartu. Endel first attended the Tartu IV elementary school in 1926. Between 1930 and 1935 Laas studied at the Tartu Boys' Gymnasium. That was followed by a military service at the Kuperjanov Battalion and the Tondi military school, which he graduated the Forestry Division of the University of Tartu, cum laude. 1940–1941 he worked as a forester, east of the Narva River. During the World War II, in 1941 Laas was mobilized to the Red Army.

After the war Laas continued his career as a scientist. In 1946 he became a lecturer at the University of Tartu, from 1951 he continued the job at the separated Estonian Agricultural Academy. In 1976 he became a professor and between 1960 and 1985 he served as the Dean of the Forestry and Land Reclamation Faculty.

In the end of the Soviet reign in Estonia, Laas was one of the reestablishers of the Student Society Liivika in 1990.

Laas died on 1 November 2009 at the age of 94.

Endel Laas's son, Eino-Endel Laas (born on July 4, 1942), is also a forest researcher and teaches in Estonian University of Life Sciences. He received the Order of the White Star, fifth class, in 2016.
