= Susanna Viktoria Mõtsmees =

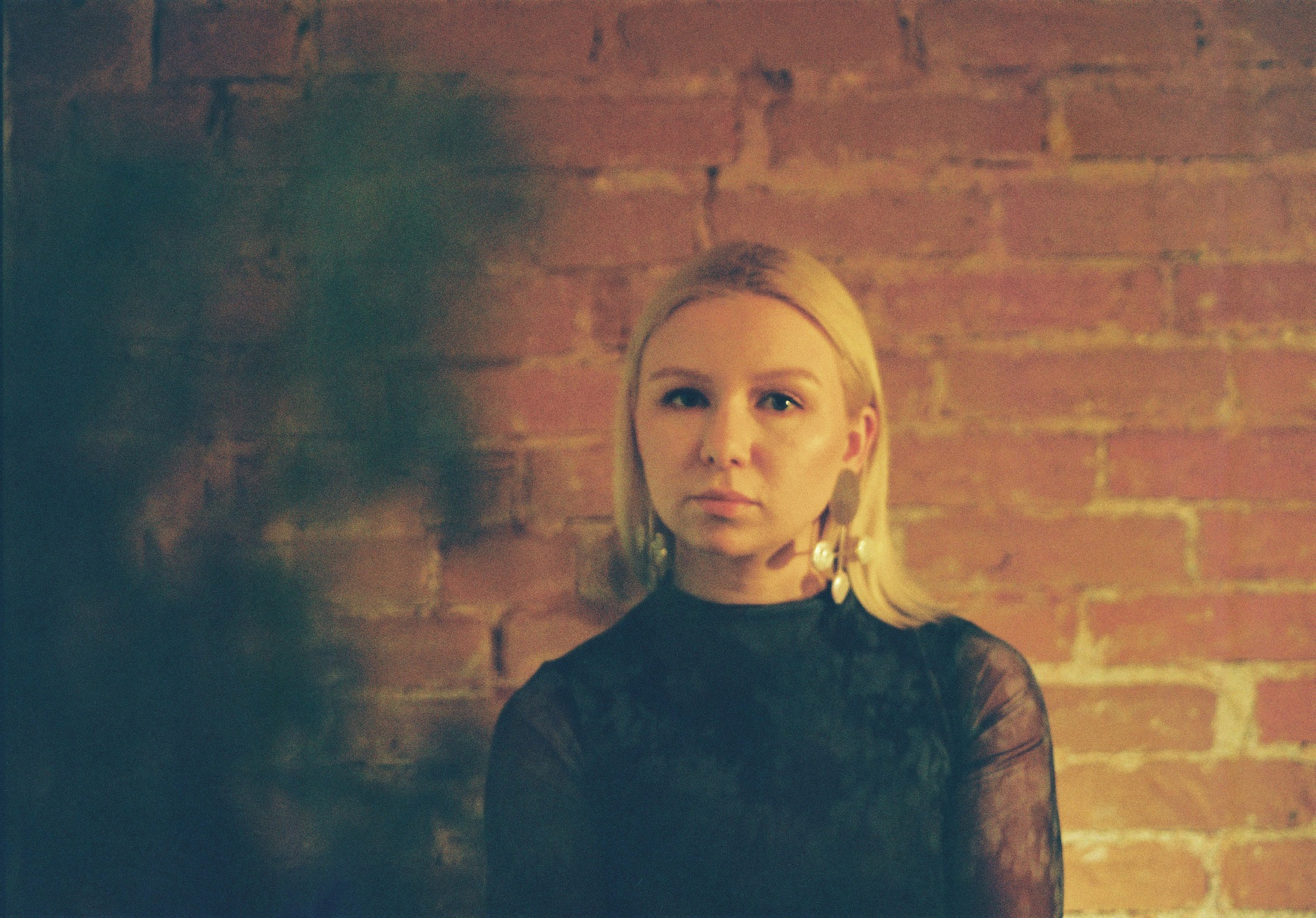

Background information
- Also known as: Susanna Viktoria
- Born: 13 May 1998 (age 28)
- Origin: Estonia
- Genres: Folktronica; Estonian folk music; Electronic music
- Years active: 2018–present
- Website: susannaviktoria.ee

Susanna Viktoria Mõtsmees (born 13 May 1998) is an Estonian musician.

Her work blends traditional Estonian folk music with electronic production, a style she describes as folktronica. She plays flute and Estonian bagpipe.

== Career ==
Susanna Viktoria discovered music in her childhood and knew from the age of seven that it would be her calling. She has studied music both in Estonia and abroad.

Her debut single "Igav iluta" was released in 2018. Her debut solo album Piibelehed followed in February 2023, and her second solo album Mõtsmees in June 2024. The latter draws on archival material – 36 songs sung by her great-grandfather Leonhard Mõtsmees as a member of Korporatsioon Revelia, recorded in 1989. The album earned three Etnokulp nominations: Artist of the Year, Album of the Year, and New Folk Artist of the Year. In 2025 she released the EP Vaarikad, based on the song diaries of her great-grandmother Ella Voltein.

The singles "Hoia kinni" and "Ilm udune tülidest" were both named song of the week on Raadio 2.

Alongside her solo work, Mõtsmees is a founding member of the folk-rock band Fylgja and performs with the bagpipe quintet EstPipes with Cätlin Mägi. She has performed at the Viljandi Folk Music Festival, Mooste Elohelü festival, Festival Võnge, and the international bagpipe festival Piping Live in Glasgow. She has also appeared as a musician in theatre productions at Teater Vanemuine, including the children's show Paberist muinasjutt and the opera Libahunt, as well as the ballet Kurat ja Jumal (2024), directed by Teet Kask with music by Timo Steiner and Sander Mölder.

== Discography ==
=== Albums ===
- Piibelehed (2023)
- Mõtsmees (2024)

=== EPs ===
- Vaarikad (2025)

=== Singles ===
- "Igav iluta" (2018)
- "Unistades" (2020)
- "Viimane unelaul" (2022, with Rosenthal)
- "Nuta inimene" (2022, with Rosenthal)
- "Hoia kinni" (2024)
- "Kui mul mure kipub" (2024)
- "Pulmad" (2024)
- "Sirelisinine" (2025, with aapeerik)
- "Kuula mind ära" (2026)
- "Sooja mere tuul" (2026)

== Recognition ==
- 2024 Etnokulp: nominated in the categories Artist of the Year, Album of the Year (Mõtsmees) and New Folk Artist of the Year
- 2025 Etnokulp: nominated in the category New Folk Artist of the Year (Vaarikad)
- 2024 Raadio 2 song of the week with singles "Hoia kinni" and "Ilm udune tülidest"
