= Rotalia =

Rotalia may refer to:

- Rotalia, the Latin name for Lääne County, Estonia
- Rotalia (corporation), an Estonian student corporation
- Rotalia (foraminifera), a genus of amoeboid protists in the order Rotaliida
