= Treimanis =

Family name

Origin
- Origin: From the German language Treumann

Treimanis (feminine: Treimane) is a Latvian masculine surname, derived from the German language surname "Treumann". Individuals with the surname include:

- Andris Treimanis (born 1985), Latvian football referee
- Edžus Treimanis (born 1988), Latvian BMX racer
