= Korporatsioon Vironia =

Estonian fraternal student organization

Coordinates: 58°23′1.12″N 26°43′9.76″E

- Founded: (O.S.) November 26, 1900; 125 years ago Riga Polytechnical Institute
- Type: Estonian Academic Corporation
- Affiliation: EKL
- Status: Active
- Scope: International
- Motto: Ühisus, kindlus, ausus "Unity, fortitude, honesty"
- Colors: Violet, Black, and White
- Flag
- Publication: Õllevikk
- Chapters: 3
- Colonies: 1
- Members: 600 lifetime
- Headquarters: Lai 30; Tartu 51005; Estonia
- Website: www.vironia.ee

Korporatsioon Vironia (abbreviated korp! Vironia or C!V!) is an Estonian fraternal student society and the oldest student corps in Estonia. The organization is named after the Latin name for the ancient Estonian county of Virumaa. A full member of the organization is called a "vironus" (abbr. "vir!"), while every member can also be called a "Vironian" (viroonlane).

== History ==
Vironia was officially founded at the Riga Polytechnical Institute on 9 December [O.S. 26 November] 1900 as the very first ethnic Estonian student corps. It remained the only Estonian student corps in Riga and became also the only Estonian member of the two Baltic German corps federations (Chargierten-Convent) in the Baltic governorates. Vironia was also the initiator and the co-founder of the League of Estonian Corporations (EKL) in 1915.

After a brief evacuation to Moscow during World War I in 1915 and a short return to Riga in 1918, Vironia entered the Estonian War of Independence in corpore. 6 of its members died in the war and one died of war injuries after the war. It was reactivated in Tartu, Estonia in 1920 and opened a second chapter in Tallinn in 1936.

After being banned following the Soviet occupation of the Baltic states in 1940, it opened 8 colonies abroad in 6 Western countries and there was also unofficial activity in Venezuela. Underground activity in occupied Estonia was restored in the 1960s and the chapters in Tallinn and Tartu were legally restored in 1989.

Today, Vironia has more than 550 members worldwide, being among the biggest Estonian student organizations. Active chapters are in Tallinn and Tartu in Estonia, Toronto, and the US West Coast.

== Foreign relations ==
Vironia retains good relations with all non-Baltic German members of the former Riga Chargierten-Convent:

- Arkonia (1879, Polish, currently in Warsaw)
- Fraternitas Arctica (1880, Baltic Russian, separate colony in Tartu)
- Selonija (1880, Latvian)
- Welecja (1883, Polish, currently in Warsaw)
- Talavija (1900, Latvian)

Of these, Vironia also has cartel agreements with Welecja (signed 1936) and Fraternitas Arctica (signed 2010). Vironia has also signed cartel agreements with the Karjalainen Osakunta in Helsinki (1930) and is currently an active member of the League of Estonian Corporations, having also signed a cartel agreement with Fraternitas Estica (2009). Unofficial relations since the exile period are retained with the Västmanlands-Dala Nation in Uppsala, Sweden, and since the 2010s with Neo-Lithuania in Kaunas, Lithuania.

== Chapters ==
- Tallinn, Estonia
- Tartu, Estonia
- Estonia Alumni Assembly
- Toronto, Canada
- West Coast United States, colony

== Notable members ==
=== Academia ===
- Karl Ipsberg – Rector of the Special Engineering Courses, Tallinn University of Technology
- Hugo Kaho – Rector of the University of Tartu
- Edgar V. Saks – Historian and author, Estonian exile government's minister of education i
- Jaan Unt – Philologist and translator

=== Art and architecture ===
- Ernst Enno – Poet and writer
- Boris Kõrver – Composer and musician
- Edgar Johan Kuusik – Architect
- Roman Toi – Composer, conductor, and organist

=== Business ===
- Eduard Aule – President of the Bank of Estonia
- Oskar Kerson – President of the Bank of Estonia in Exile (1968–1980)
- Peter Leoke – Publisher
- Harry Männil – Businessman and cultural benefactor
- Märten Ross – Deputy President of the Bank of Estonia
- Artur Uibopuu – President of the Bank of Estonia

=== Military ===
- Gustav Jonson – Major General, Chief of Cavalry regiments of the Estonian Ground Force in the War of Independence (1918-1919)

=== Politics ===
- Oskar Amberg – Minister of Labour and Welfare, Minister of War, Minister of Roads, and Member of Parliament
- Eduard Aule – Minister of Nutrition and Member of Parliament
- Karl Ipsberg – Minister of Roads, Deputy Minister of Commerce and Industry, and Member of Parliament
- Hugo Kaho – Member of Parliament
- Kalev Kallemets – Member of Parliament
- Juhan Kalm – Member of Parliament
- August Kerem – Deputy State Elder, Minister of Agriculture, Minister of Roads, Minister of Defense
- Tõnis Kint – Prime Minister in duties of the President, acting Prime Minister in Exile, Deputy Prime Minister in Exile, Minister of Agriculture in Exile, Acting Minister of War in Exile, and Member of Parliament
- Andres Küng – Member of Parliament and MP of Sweden
- Juhan Kurvits – Member of Parliament
- Peeter Kurvits – Minister of Economic Affairs, II Deputy President of the Riigikogu, and Member of Parliament
- Viktor Päts – Member of Parliament
- Jaan Mägi – Member of Parliament
- Jaan Raudsepp – Minister of Roads
- Villem Reinok – Member of Parliament
- Juhan Ross – Member of Parliament
- Edgar V. Saks – Minister of Education in Exile
- Karl Selter – Minister of Economic Affairs, Minister of Foreign Affairs, and Member of Parliament
- Leo Sepp – Minister of Monetary Affairs and Minister of Economic Affairs
- Johan Sihver – Member of Parliament
- Edgar Sulg – Member of Parliament
- Anton Teetsov – Minister of Monetary Affairs
- Artur Uibopuu – Member of Parliament
- Georg Vestel – Deputy State Elder, Minister of Monetary Affairs, and Minister of Commerce-Industry
- Nikolai Viitak – Minister of Roads and Member of Parliament

== See also ==
- List of fraternities and sororities in Estonia
