= Sarv (surname) =

Sarv is an Estonian surname. Notable people with the surname include:

- Enn Sarv (1921–2008), Estonian freedom fighter
- Jaan Sarv (1877–1954), Estonian mathematician and educator
- Kristjan Sarv (born 1979), Estonian actor
- Mari Sarv, birth name of Mari Väina (born 1972), Estonian folklorist
- Mikk Sarv (1951–2018), Estonian folklorist and biologist
