= Martin Flannery =

Martin Flannery may refer to:

- Martin Flannery (Australian politician)
- Martin Flannery (British politician)
- Martin Flannery (physicist)
