= Lüüs =

Family name

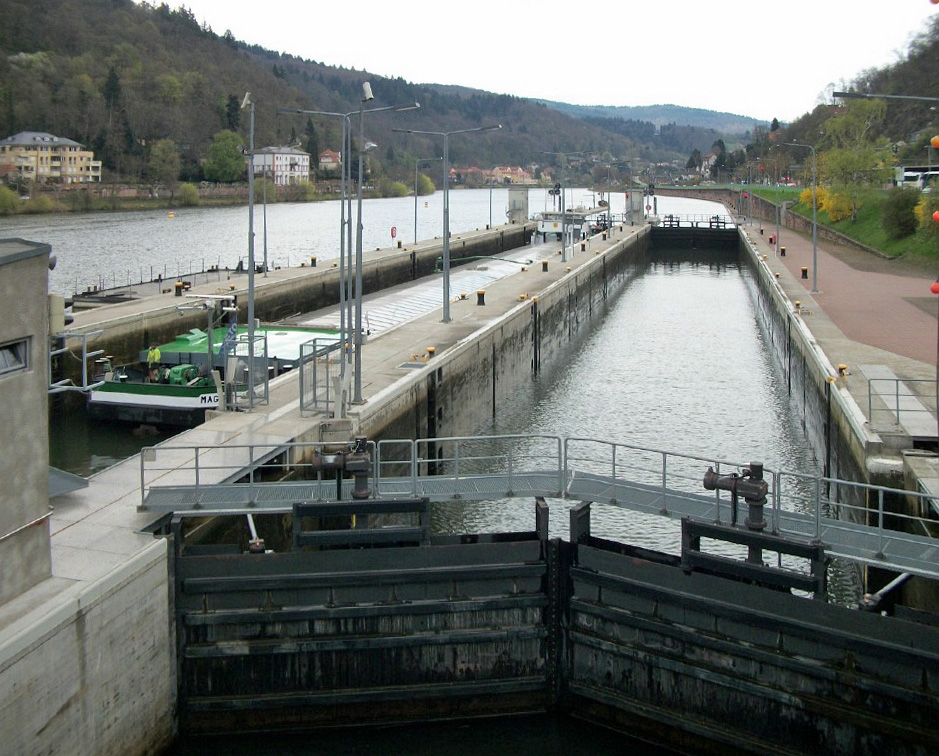

Origin
- Language: Estonian
- Meaning: lock, sluice
- Region of origin: Estonia

Lüüs is an Estonian language surname, derived from the Dutch sluis, meaning lock and sluice.

As of 1 January 2021, 73 men and 84 women in Estonia have the surname Lüüs. Lüüs is ranked the 1272th most common surname for men in Estonia and 1176th for women. The surname Lüüs is most common in Võru County, where 4.81 per 10,000 inhabitants of the county bear the surname.

Notable people bearing the surname Lüüs include:

- Aadu Lüüs (1878–1967), pediatrician and medical scientist
- Ella Lüüs (1915–1996), graphic artist
- Kristjan Lüüs (born 1991), actor
- Lembit Lüüs (1910–1999), Estonian SSR statesman
- Villem Lüüs (1971–2020), draughts player
