= Artur Amon =

Estonian basketball player (1916–1944)

Personal information
- Born: 17 February 1916 Tartu, Governorate of Livonia
- Died: 3 September 1944 (aged 28) Õru Parish, Generalbezirk Estland

Career information
- College: University of Tartu

Artur "Ats" Amon (17 February 1916 – 3 September 1944) was an Estonian basketball player. He competed in the 1936 Summer Olympics.

Amon was born in Tartu, where he attended secondary school at Tartu Boys' Gymnasium before enrolling at the University of Tartu, majoring in chemistry. While at the University of Tartu, he belonged to the Student Society Liivika.

From 1928 onward, he played basketball, volleyball, table tennis, and athletics at the Boys' Sports Association's courses and competitions. Between 1932 and 1935, he played on the basketball team of the Tartu YMCA. He was the Estonian volleyball champion in the Tartu YMCA in 1934 and the Kalev Tallinn team in 1937, 1938, and 1939. From 1936 until 1940, he played basketball for Kalev Tallinn, and in 1941, for Tallinna JK Dünamo. He became the Estonian champion in 1934, 1936 and 1941, winning 4 silver and 3 bronze medals. He was a member of the Estonia men's national basketball team 12 times, including at the 1936 Berlin Summer Olympics, and the 1939 European Basketball Championships, where he achieved fifth place.

Following the outbreak of World War II and the Soviet occupation of Estonia, Amon joined the Finnish backed Haukka-Tümmler intelligence group of the Estonian Forest Brothers partisans as a wireless radio operator. He was taken prisoner by the Soviets during the Tartu offensive while on a mission to observe troop movements prior to the Red Army's main offensive on the Väike Emajõgi river. He was killed by gunshot by Soviet soldiers during an escape attempt in Õru Parish, aged 28.
