= Märten Ross =

Estonian economist and state official

Märten Ross (born 26 July 1971 in Tallinn) is an Estonian economist and state official.

In 1993 he graduated from Tallinn University of Technology, and later he graduated from Stockholm University (master's degree).

From 1992 to 2011 he worked at Bank of Estonia. From 2000 to 2011 he was vice-president of Bank of Estonia.

He has been a member of the student organization Korporatsioon Vironia.

In 2008 he was awarded with Order of the White Star, III class.
