= Treumann =

Treumann is a German language surname. Notable people with the surname include:

- Jaan Treumann (1881–1941), Estonian Lutheran clergyman, educator, and politician
- Karl Treumann (1823–1877), Austrian actor, operetta singer, theatre director, and writer
- Louis Treumann (1872–1943), Austrian actor and operetta tenor
- Wanda Treumann (1883-1963), German actress and film producer
