= List of fraternities and sororities in Estonia =

This is the list of fraternities and sororities based in Estonia, along with their umbrella associations. For example, the League of Estonian Corporations (EKL) is an umbrella organization for Estonian student corporations.

From 1940 to 1941 and 1944 to 1991, Estonia was occupied by the Soviet Union as the Estonian Soviet Socialist Republic. In 1940, all fraternities and sororities were banned; although many survived outside of Estonia as chapters established by alumni or as sub rosa operations in Estonia. Since the following list only includes organizations operating in Estonia, fraternities and sororities are listed as inactive during the era of occupation. More information about the Soviet era can be found in notes and articles about each group.

== Fraternities ==
Following is a list of the corporations for male students that are based in Estonia, with inactive corporations and institutions are indicated in italics.

Corporations	Charter date and range	Founding location	Affiliation	Colors	Status	Ref.
Arminia Dorpatensis	March 3, 1865 – 1940; May 2, 1994	University of Tartu	Wingolf	Black; White; Gold	Active	(Note: This was an association of Christian students.)
Ave	November 1, 1987	Tallinn University of Technology		Yellow; Black; White	Active	(Note: Was originally a coed group known as EÜS AVE. However, women were excluded after three years when it was allowed to become a Korps.)
Baltonia	March 24, 1872 – 1939	Tartu, Estonia		Black; Blue; Red	Inactive	(Note: This is a professional fraternity for pharmacists. It originally was called Frat. Pharmaceutica.)
Boeteia	February 1, 1924 – 19xx ?	Tallinn, Estonia		Blue; Red; Gold	Inactive	
Chargierten Convent	18xx ?–xxxx ?	University of Tartu			Inactive	
Curonia	1808–1939	Tartu, Estonia			Moved	(Note: This German student corp relocated to Germany after being closed in Estonia.)
Dorpatensis Fraternitas Academica	1857–1862	Tartu, Estonia			Inactive	(Note: A Korps formed by Latvian students.)
Fraternitas Academica	May 27, 1881 – 1939	Tartu, Estonia		Violet; Blue; White	Moved	
Fraternitas Aeterna	November 9, 1923 – 1931	Tartu, Estonia		Black; White; Orange	Merged	(Note: This was a Russian corps that merged with Boeteia.)
Fraternitas Dorpatensis	April 5, 1854 – xxxx ?	Tartu Veterinary Institute			Inactive	(Note: The fraternity went inactive after the founding of Frat. Tartuensis.)
Fraternitas Estica	May 9, 1907 – 1940; March 1989	Tartu, Estonia	EKL	Blue; Green; White	Active	
Fraternitas Fennica	October 26, 1926 – 1929	Tartu, Estonia			Inactive	(Note: This was a corps for Finnish students. It went inactive because the Finnish students began joining Estonian corps. It was revived as a coed society in 1994.)
Fraternitas Leholensis	1927–19xx ?	Tartu, Estonia		Violet; Black; Green	Merged	(Note: Merged into Korp! Harjola.)
Fraternitas Liviensis	January 28, 1918 – 1940; May 6, 1989	Tartu, Estonia	EKL	Violet; Green; White	Active	
Fraternitas Normannia	19xx ?–1938	Tartu, Estonia		Red; Silver; Blue	Inactive	
Fraternitas Rigensis	February 21, 1823	Tartu, Estonia			Inactive ?	(Note: German student corps.)
Fraternitas Ruthenia	May 17, 1929 – 1932	Tartu, Estonia		Red; Black; Gold	Inactive	(Note: Russian male corps! with chapters in Tartu, Tallinn, Dresden, and Prague.)
Fraternitas Slavia	February 2, 1923 – 1940	Tartu, Estonia		Red; White; Gold	Inactive	(Note: This was a Russian men's corps.)
Fraternitas Tartuensis	March 27, 1929 – 1940; April 27, 1989	Tartu Veterinary Institute	EKL	Green; White; Violet	Active	(Note: Formed by former members of Frat. Dorpatensis. It operated sub rosa for a time after the Soviet occupation and also survived via chapters in the United States and Australia. It was registered with the Learned Council of the Estonian Academy of Agriculture in 1989, officially reestablishing in Estonia.)
Fraternitas Ucuensis	October 3, 1948 – 19xx ?	Baltic University	EKL (former)	Black; White; Blue	Inactive	(Note: Its campus chapter closed on November 19, 1949, after the temporary university ceased operations. Most of its members moved to the United States and continued to meet in New York.)
Fraternitas Viliensis	February 22, 1890 – February 27, 1891	Estonia		Blue; Black; White	Inactive	(Note: The group organized but disbanded because it never received the needed governmental approval.)
Harjola	May 8, 1925 – 1940 ?	Tartu, Estonia		Violet; Black; Green	Inactive	
Hasmonaea	February 10, 1923 – 1939	Tartu, Estonia		Light blue Gold; White	Inactive	(Note: This was a corporation of Jewish students.) (Note: Formed by Zionist members of the Academic Society for Learning Jewish History and Culture.)
Kaleva	February 25, 1927 – 1934	Estonia		Green; Red; Dark blue	Inactive	(Note: Formed by reserve and active army officers studying at the university, this group was between a society and a corps.)
Kaljola	March 8, 1922 – 1935	Tallinn, Estonia		Olive green Blue; White	Inactive	(Note: Merged into Rotalia.)
Korp Estonia	September 8, 1821 – 1939	Tartu, Estonia		Green; Violet; White	Moved	
Korp! Leola	October 16, 1920 – 1940; February 20, 1989	Tallinn University of Technology	EKL	Purple; Gold; White	Active	(Note: The fraternity was formed at Tallinn Technical University which closed in 1933. The fraternity moved to the University of Tartu in 1934. After a forced closure in Estonia, the fraternity operated in Sweden, Canada, and the United States, until finally returning to Estonia in 1989.)
Korp! Rotalia	November 10, 1913 – c. 1940; 19xx ?	Saint Petersburg, Russia	EKL	Blue; Black; Green	Active	
Korp! Ventonia	May 1917 – December 1943; January 1990	Tartu, Estonia		Blue; White; Green	Active	
Korp Wäinla	December 6, 1924 – 1939	Gdańsk University of Technology	EKL (former)	Black; White; Blue	Inactive	(Note: Formed as DEÜ.S Wäinla, later changing its name to Välis-Eesti Korp! Wäinla. It was forced to close by the Soviet government. Most of its members left Estonia and settled in Germany, Montreal, Stockholm, Australia, and New York City, US.)
Korporatsioon Fraternitas Tartuensis	March 27, 1929 – 1940; March 3, 1989	Tartu Veterinary Institute	EKL (former)	Green; White; Violet	Active	
Korporatsioon Hasmonea	1923–1940	Estonia		Blue; White; Orange	Inactive	
Korporatsioon Kaljola	March 8, 1922 – November 9, 1935	Tallinn Technical University			Merged	(Note: Merged with Rotalia.)
Korporatsioon Kungla	April 11, 1924 – February 7, 1927	Tallinn Technical University		Black; Violet; White	Inactive	(Note: The university terminated the group after it attacked members of Korporatsioon Ugala on October 17, 1926.)
Korporatsioon Neobaltia	May 28, 1879 – 1939	Tartu, Estonia	Chargiertenconvent	Light blue White; Orange	Inactive	
Korporatsioon Revelia	December 3, 1920 – c. 1947; March 31, 1989	Tartu, Estonia	EKL	Green; Black; White	Active	(Note: The fraternity operated sub rosa for several years after the Soviet occupation of Estonia, but eventually moved abroad as its members relocated.)
Korporatsioon Sakala	November 14, 1909 – 1940; May 12, 1989	Tartu, Estonia	EKL	Blue; Violet; White	Active	
Korporatsioon Syringa	April 7, 1990	Tallinn, Estonia	Independent	Lilac; Red; White	Inactive	
Korporatsioon Tehnola	October 23, 1921 – August 1940; May 22, 1989	Tallinn Technical University	EKL	Black; Green; White	Active	(Note: Korp! Tehnola's assets were assigned to be handed over to the Communist Youth Association of Balti Manufaktur on August 31, 1940.)
Korporatsioon Ugala	October 29, 1913 – 1940; December 17, 1988	Tartu, Estonia	EKL	Black; Blue; White	Active	
Korporatsioon Vicinia	October 14, 1928 – May 11, 1931	University of Tartu		Black; Violet; White	Inactive	(Note: Formed from the merger of Societas Vicinia (originally called Societas Studiosorum Narvesium) and the Corporation Vigilia. Korp! Rotalia absorbed its members and alumni on June 1, 1931.)
Korporatsioon Vigilia	February 24, 1927 – October 14, 1928	University of Tartu		Black; Violet; White	Merged	(Note: Merged with the Societas Vicinia to form Korporatsioon Vicinia.)
Korporatsioon Vironia	November 26, 1900 – 1940; 1989	Riga, Latvia	EKL	Violet; Black; White	Active	
Kungla	April 11, 1924 – February 1, 1927			Black; Violet; White	Inactive	(Note: Closed by the university over a scandal.)
Latvia	1917–19xx ?	Tartu, Estonia		Red; Blue; Gold	Inactive ?	
Letgallia	1899–19xx ?	Tartu, Estonia		Green; Black; White	Inactive ?	(Note: Latvian Pharmacists' corps)
Lettonia	1882 – September 28, 1919	Tartu, Estonia	EKL (former)	Green; Blue; Gold	Moved	(Note: This Latvian men's corps moved to Riga, Latvia.)
Limuwia	February 24, 1927 – 1940	Tartu, Estonia		Blue; White; Gold	Inactive	(Note: This Jewish Men's corps was formed from the Literature, Music and Science Society of Jewish Students, established in 1907.)
Livonia	September 20, 1822 – 1930	Tartu, Estonia		Green; Red; White	Moved	
Rajala	May 2, 1924 – 1934	Tartu, Estonia		Black; Violet; Light blue	Inactive	
Tarbatonia	late 19th century				Inactive	
Ugandala	1920s	Tallinn, Estonia			Inactive	
Vicinia	October 21, 1921 – October 14, 1928	University of Tartu		Violet; Silver; Blue	Merged	(Note: Originally called Societas Studiosorum Narvesium. Later, it merged with the Korporatsioon Vicinia to form Korporatsioon Vicinia.)
Vigilia	1920	Tartu, Estonia			Merged	(Note: Merged into Korps! Rotalia.)

== Sororities ==
This is a list of corporations for female students based in Estonia, with inactive corporations indicated in italics.

Corporations	Charter date and range	Founding location	Affiliation	Colors	Status	Ref.
Filiae Patriae	October 27, 1920 – 1940; February 17, 1989	University of Tartu	Independent	White; Red; Green	Active	(Note: This was the first corporation for female students that was established in Estonia.)
Hazfiro (Hacfiro)	February 27, 1925 – 1938	Tallinn, Estonia			Inactive	(Note: Jewish women's student society formed by former members of the Academic Society for Learning Jewish History and Culture. It closed due to a lack of members, with most of its remaining members returning to the Academic Society.)
Korporatsioon Amicitia	November 21, 1924 – June 27, 1940; April 28, 1989	University of Tartu	Independent	Lilac; Dark green Gold	Active	
Korporatsioon Indla	March 7, 1924 – 1940; March 31, 1989	University of Tartu	Independent	Cherry brown White; Green	Active	
Korporatsioon Lembela	October 24, 1924 – September 19, 1937; March 31, 1990	University of Tartu	Independent	Light Beige; Green; Violet	Active	(Note: It was reestablished in Tallinn.)
Korporatsioon Sororitas Estoniae	March 16, 2011	Tallinn, Estonia	Independent	White; Crimson pink Black	Active	
Sororitas Oriens	May 18, 1928 – December 13, 1937	University of Tartu		Carmine Pink; Silver; Blue	Inactive ?	(Note: Corps for Russian woman.)
Syringa	April 7, 1990	Tallinn, Estonia		Lilac; Red; White		

== Societies ==
The following are male and female Estonian societies (Estonian: üliõpilasseltsid). The Union of Student Societies (Estonia: Üliõpilasseltside Liit) (ÜL) is an umbrella organization for Estonian student societies. Note that the abbreviation ÜS stands for üliõpilasselts sõnast or student association or student society.

Society	Charter date and range	Founding location	Affiliation	Colors	Status	Ref.
Academic Jewish Society of History and Literature	October 1938 – 1940	University of Tartu			Inactive	
Academic Society for Learning Jewish History and Culture	1872–October 1938	Tartu, Estonia			Inactive	(Note: Reorganized as the Academic Jewish Society of History and Literature.)
Balti Saksa Naisüliõpilaste Ühing (Baltic German Women's Association)	February 9, 1923 – 1939	Tartu, Estonia		Black; White Red Blue	Inactive	(Note: Relocated to Germany in 1939.)
Eesti Naisüliõpilaste Selts (Estonian Society of Women Students)	November 14, 1911 – 1940; November 1988	Tartu, Estonia	ÜL (former)	None	Active	
Eesti Naisüliõpilaste Selts Ahava (Estonian Society of Women Students Ahava)	April 11, 1924 – November 2, 1930	University of Tartu	ÜL	White; Dark blue	Inactive	
Eesti Üliõpilasselts Ühendus (Estonian Student Association)	1906–1940	Estonia	ÜL		Inactive	
Eesti Üliõpilaste Selts (Estonian Students' Society)	April 7, 1870 – 1940 ?; 19xx ?	Tartu, Estonia	Independent	Blue; Black; White	Active	
EÜS Põhjala (Estonian Student Society Põhjala)	November 13, 1884 – 1940; November 1989	Saint Petersburg, Russia	ÜL (former)	None	Active	(Note: The society moved to Estonia in 1918.)
EYS Veljesto (Estonia Student Society Veljesto)	February 24, 1920 – July 31, 1940; May 13, 1957	Tartu, Estonia	ÜL	None	Active	
Fraternitas Fennica	1994	Tartu, Estonia		Gold; Black; White	Active	(Note: This was a corps for Finnish students in the 1920s. It was revived as a coed society.)
Literature, Music and Science Society of Jewish Students	1907–1925				Inactive	(Note: Became Limuwia in 1925.)
Petserimaa Üliõpilaste Selts (Petserimaa Students Society)	1924–1934	University of Tartu			Inactive	
Russian Student Society	November 3, 1920 – 1940	Tartu, Estonia			Inactive	
Setumaa Eesti Üliõpilaste Selts (Setumaa Estonian Students Society)	February 12, 1926 – 1940	University of Tartu			Inactive	
Tartu Academic Society		University of Tartu			Inactive	(Note: Jewish student society at the University of Tartu)
Üliõpilasselts Concordia (Concordia Student Society)	March 11, 1923 – 1940	University of Tartu	ÜL	Cornflower blue Golden yellow Black	Inactive	(Note: Formed as the coed Harjumaa Student Association. In September 1923, it was renamed Concordia Underground Student Society. In 1924, it was reorganized and named Concordia Student Society. It became an all-male society in 1927.)
Üliõpilasühing Fraternitas Fennica (Student Association Fraternitas Fennica)	October 22, 1926 – 1929; November 9, 1994	University of Tartu		Gold; Black; White	Active	
ÜS Latvian (Latvian Student Society)	February 11, 1927 – 1930	Tartu, Estonia			Inactive	(Note: Changed to a color bearing organization called Metreine.)
ÜS Lechicja (Student Society Lechicja)		University of Tartu			Inactive	(Note: Polish student-pharmacist society)
ÜS Liivika (Student Society Liivika)	April 21, 1909 – June 1940; June 1991	Riga, Latvia	ÜL (former)	None	Active	(Note: It was originally called Estonian Students' Society of Riga (Estonian: Riia Eesti Üliõpilaste Selts) but changed its name when it moved to Tartu after World War I. It publicly closed but operated sub rose during the Soviet occupation, but pu)
ÜS Metreine (Student Association Metreine)	1930–1935	University of Tartu		Red; White; Green	Inactive	(Note: Formed from the Latvian Student Society.)
ÜS Raimla (Student Association Raimla)	September 22, 1922 – 1940; September 4, 1989	Tartu, Estonia	ÜL (former)	Light blue White; Golden yellow	Active	
ÜS Väinola (Student Association Väinola)	October 19, 1928 – 1930	Tartu, Estonia			Inactive	
ÜS Valgma (Student Association Valgma)	October 3, 1922 – 19xx ?	Tallinn, Estonia			Inactive	
ÜS Viires (Student Association Viires)	November 27, 1925 – 1928	Tartu, Estonia			Inactive	(Note: Arts and sciences enthusiasts' society)
