= Student Society Liivika =

Student organization based in Estonia

- Founded: April 21, 1909; 116 years ago Riga, Latvia
- Type: Estonian Student Society
- Affiliation: Union of Student Societies (former)
- Status: Active
- Scope: Local
- Motto: Ex solo ad solem soli patriae "Up from the Soil to the Sun for the Benefit of Homeland"
- Member badge
- Chapters: 1
- Headquarters: KE von Baeri tn 7 Tartu 51005; Estonia
- Website: liivika.ee

Student Society Liivika (Estonian: ÜS Liivika) is an Estonian student society.

== History ==
Student Society Liivika was established on April 21, 1909, in Riga, Latvia, mostly by former members of the student corporation Vironia. Its original name was Estonian Students' Society of Riga (Estonian: Riia Eesti Üliõpilaste Selts), but was changed when it moved to Tartu after World War I.

== Symbols ==
The society's motto is Ex solo ad solem soli patriae, which means "Up from the Soil to the Sun for the benefit of Homeland".

The symbol of membership is a silver ring with its coat of arms and the motto. The coat of arms has a lion above a golden wave. Below the wave is the letter "L" decorated with oak leaves. The lion represents masculinity, the letter "L" is for Liivikat, the oak leaves represent the love of one's country, and the golden wave represents the predecessor organization.

The society does not have distinct colors and its members wear white student caps.

== Notable members ==
- Artur Amon, basketball player
- Johannes Hint, scientist
- Paul Keres, chess grandmaster
- Juhan Kukk, politician
- Kaarel Liidak, agronomist and politician
- Mihkel Mathiesen, politician
- Georg Meri, diplomat and translator
- Uuno Öpik, atomic physicist
- Anton Uesson, politician and engineer
- Valev Uibopuu, writer
- Trivimi Velliste, politician

== See also ==
- List of fraternities and sororities in Estonia
