= Johan Müller (politician) =

Estonian politician

Johan Müller (22 October 1889 – 3 November 1981 Toronto, Canada) was an Estonian politician.

In 1933 he was Minister of Justice and Internal Affairs. 1934–38 he was Minister of Justice.

He was an honorary alumnus of the Estonian Students' Society.
