= Heinrich Rosenthal =

Estonian writer (1846–1916)

Heinrich Rosenthal (7 July [O.S. 25 June] 1846 – 10 May 1916) was an activist of the Estonian national movement, doctor and author.

Rosenthal was born in Tartu. He was a founder of the Estonian Students' Society in 1870 while a student at the University of Tartu. Later he helped to found corporation Fraternitas Estica in 1907.

He wrote the book Kulturbestrebungen des estnischen Volkes während eines Menschenalters (1869-1900) (The cultural aspirations of the Estonian people during one generation (1869-1900)) (Reval: Cordes & Schenk, 1912). He died in Tallinn, aged 69.

== Bibliography ==
- "Eesti rahva kultuuripüüdlused ühe inimpõlve vältel: mälestusi aastatest 1869-1900", tõlkinud Krista Räni; saatesõna ja kommentaarid kirjutanud Mart Laar, Tartu, 2004.
- "Kulturbestrebungen des estnischen Volkes während eines Menschenalters (1869-1900)", Tallinn, 1912.
