= Kalev Kallemets =

Estonian politician

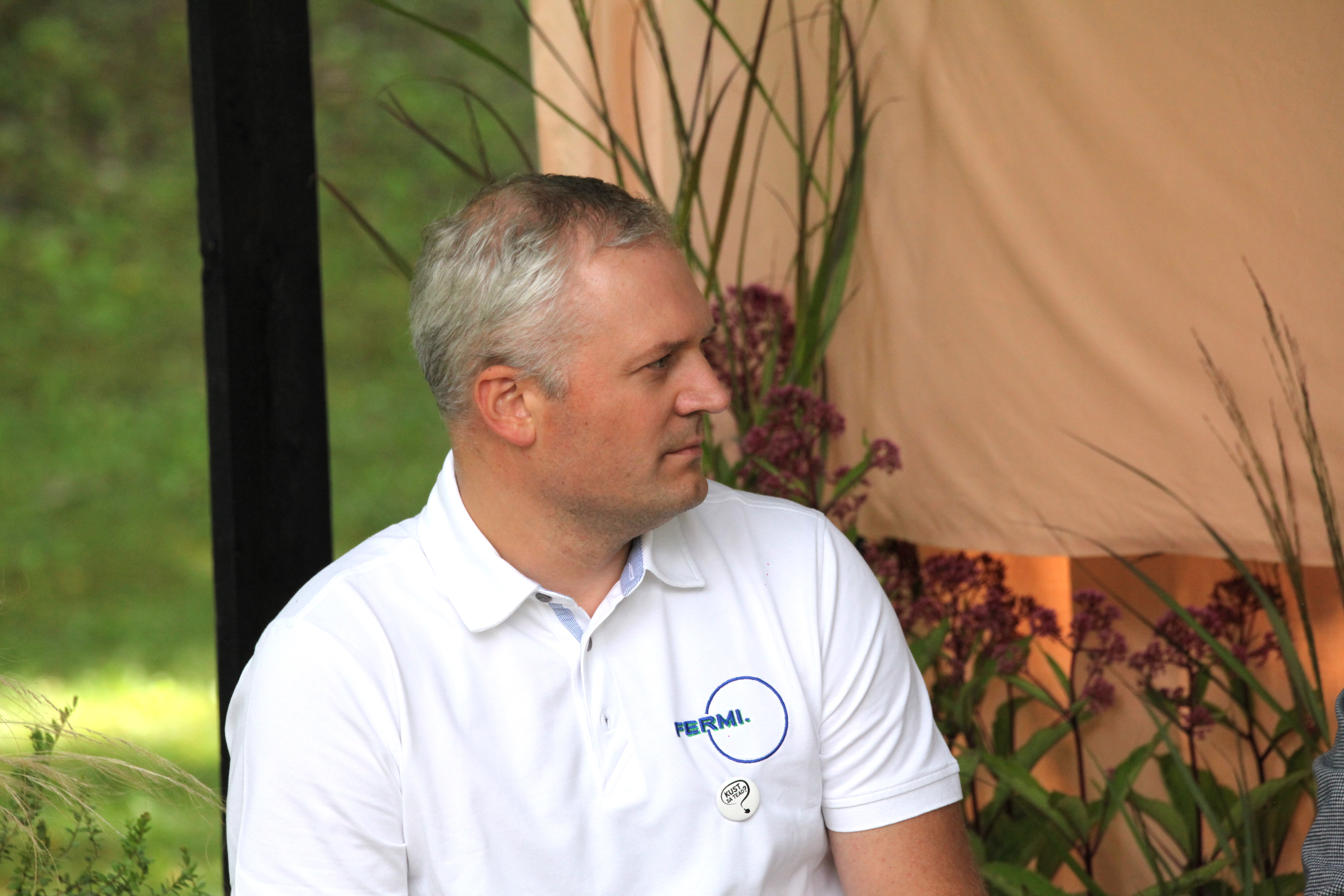
Kalev Kallemets at the Opinion Festival 2021 in Paide, Estonia

Kalev Kallemets (born 18 April 1979, Haapsalu) is an Estonian politician. He was a member of the Riigikogu, representing the Estonian Reform Party, from 2014 to 2015.

Kallemets graduated from Taebla Gymnasium in 1997. In 2002, he graduated with a bachelor's degree from the Faculty of Economics at Tallinn University of Technology. In 2008, he graduated with a master's degree in financial management from the Estonian Business School. Since 2009, he has been a PhD student at Tallinn University of Technology (supervised by Üllas Ehrlich). He is a member of Korporatsioon Vironia.

He worked as an internal auditor from 2001 to 2002 at the Ministry of Justice. From 2002 to 2003, he was the secretary general of the Estonian Reform Party's Youth Council. From 2003 to 2008, he was a member of the board of directors of OÜ Gutsch, as well as the CEO of the Estonian Nuclear Power Plant from 2008 to 2011, and working at Viru Keemia Grupp AS from 2011 to 2014.

He has been a member of the Estonian Reform Party since 1998. He applied for the Haapsalu City Council in the 1999 and 2005 municipal elections on the Reform Party list (receiving 3 votes in 1999 and 2 votes in 2005, both of which left him unelected); He again applied for the City Council in 2009 and 2013 for the municipal elections (receiving 62 votes in 2009 and 24 votes in 2013, again not being elected). He was a candidate for the Riigikogu elections in 2003 and 2007 (when he received 245 votes in 2003 and 353 in 2007, leaving him unelected). In the 2011 Riigikogu election, he received 469 votes. Yet again, he was not elected, but he became a member of the Riigikogu from 18 June 2014 to 2015 as a replacement within the party list. He also was a candidate in the 2009 European Parliament Election, but he was not elected.

He was a candidate in the 2015 Riigikogu election in Tallinn and received 423 votes, but was not elected.
