= Andres Koern =

Estonian entrepreneur. 1993–2004 (born 1946)

Andres Koern (born 13 April 1946) is an Estonian entrepreneur.

1993–2004, he was chief executive officer of AS Põltsamaa Felix (:et). He has been a member of the supervisory board of AS Bigbank.

In 2001, he was awarded with Order of the White Star, V class.

He is an honorary alumnus of the Estonian Students' Society.
