= Fraternitas Estica =

Student organization based in Estonia

Coordinates: 58°22′22.03″N 26°42′50.12″E

- C!F!E!
- Founded: May 9, 1907; 118 years ago University of Tartu
- Type: Estonian Academic Corporation
- Affiliation: EKL
- Status: Active
- Scope: International
- Motto: Teos õiglane ja vahvas, ustav sulle, Eesti rahvas! "The work is just and great, faithful to you, Estonian people"
- Colors: Blue, Green, and White
- Flag
- Chapters: 2 collegiate, 4 graduate
- Nickname: Frater Esticus
- Headquarters: Vanemuise 54; Tartu 50410; Estonia
- Website: www.cfe.ee

Fraternitas Estica (C!F!E!) or Korporatsioon Fraternitas Estica is an all-male academic corporation at the University of Tartu in Tartu, Estonia. It was founded in 1907 and was reestablished in 1988.

== History ==
In August 1900, Aleksander Paldrok spoke to the Estonian Students' Society's general assembly, proposing that the group form a corps. However, his proposal did not receive support. In 1904, twelve members of the Estonian Student's Society left it to establish a separate corporation. Initially, they called the group Aestia but soon changed it to Korporatsioon Fraternitas Estica for historical reasons. In 1906, Fraternitas Estica asked the rector of University of Tartu to approve this new corps and received recognition in April 1907.

Fraternitas Estica made its first public appearance with its colors on May 9, 1907 (26 April according to the Julian calendar). This is considered the corps' official charter date.

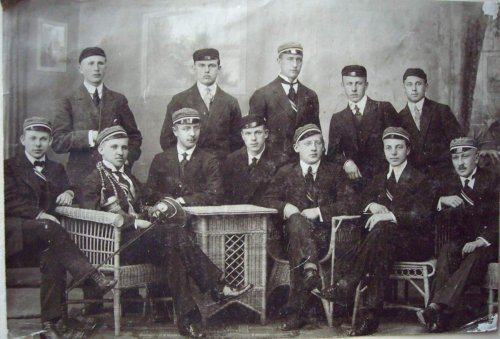
Fraternitas Estica c. 1913

In 1913, a rift grew in the organization, resulting in the expulsion of eleven active members; these former members established Korporatsioon Ugala. During the German occupation of 1918, Fraternitas Estica was for some time boycotted by other Estonian student organizations. Fraternitas Estica was the first student organization to join in the Estonian War of Independence, resulting in the deaths of 21 members.

During the 1920s, the corps' members enjoyed fox training, beer evenings, and outings with women's organizations. Together with the Corps! Vironia, Fraternitas Estica founded the Union of Estonian Corporations. The corps acquired land and built its convent house at Aia Street 54 (now Vanemuise 54) in Tartu in 1932.

A second chapter was established in Tallinn in the mid-1930s. The Tallinn Convention acquired a convent house and grew to 42 members and 108 alumni by early 1940. When Estonia came under the rule of the Soviet Union on August 6, 1940, Fraternitas Estica and its alumni association were declared illegal and were dissolved as its house was nationalized and its assets were taken by the Soviets. Members hid some of the corps' belongs for safekeeping and continued to meet sub rosa. In 1941, 109 members were taken to Russia, with 49 dying on the way.

Only 192 of the corps' 438 members managed to escape the Russian occupation, mostly by fleeing to Germany or Sweden. While in exile in Sweden, members established the Swedish National Team in 1946. A new constitution for the corps was approved in 1949 to oversee its operations in exile. Members established teams in Canada and the United States in 1950 and in Australia in 1957. The alumni and newly recruited members of the teams stayed in contact through the publication of occasional circulars.

In August 1991, the Estonian Soviet Socialist Republic became the Republic of Estonia. At the time, the diaspora of Fraternitas Estica shows in its 1991 roster, with 96 members living in Sweden, 119 in Canada, 80 in the United States, 16 in Australia, 13 in Brazil, 4 in Germany, 4 in Finland, 2 in England, 2 in Norway, 2 in Switzerland, and 1 in France.

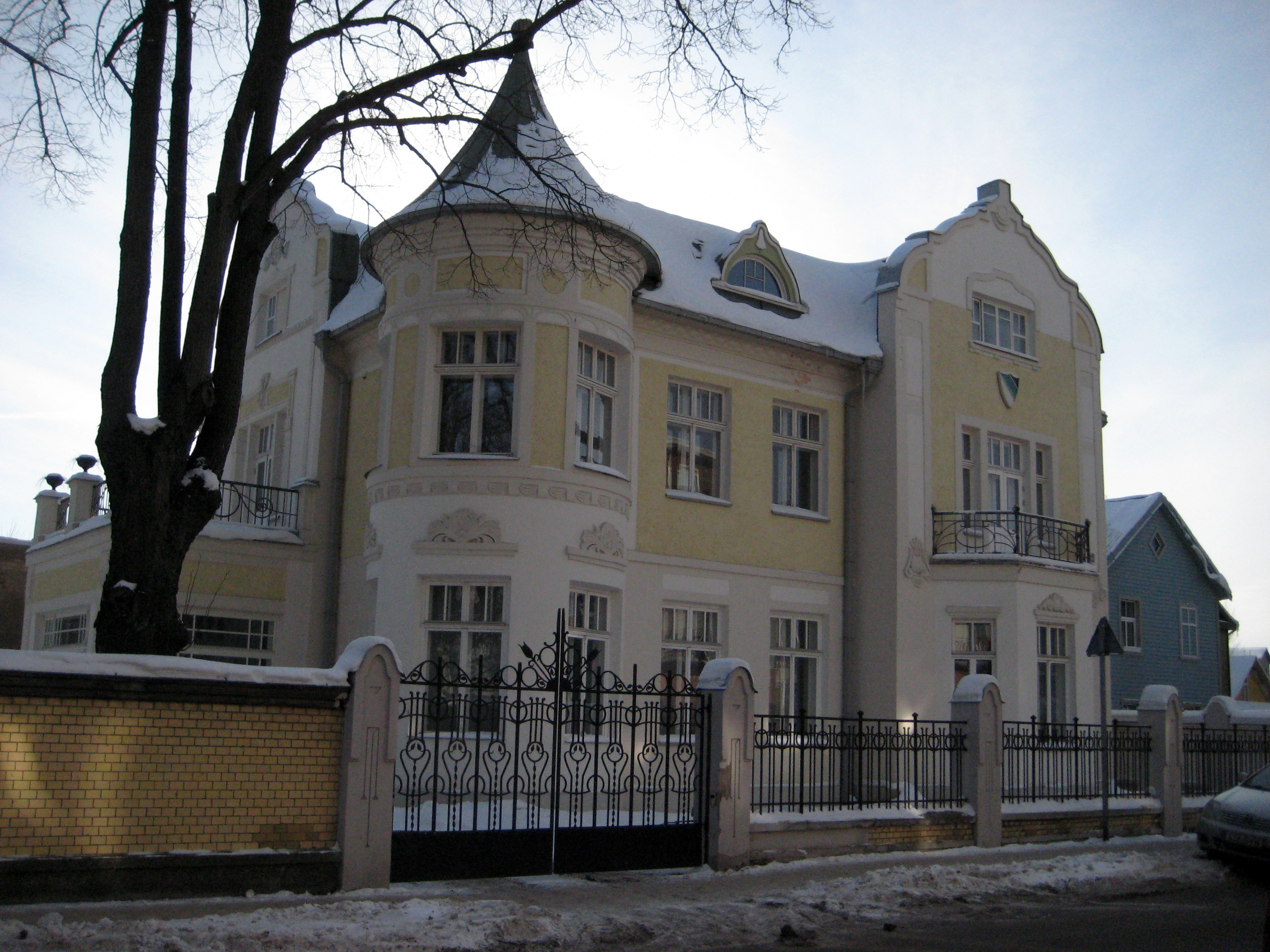
Tartu convent house, 2012

=== Reestablishment ===
In 1988, Vallo Nuust, Margus Sanglepp, and Jaan Murumets, three students from the faculty of journalism of Tartu University, decided to reestablish Fraternitas Estica. In March 1989, Tartu University approved the organization. The group was also recognized by the Estonian Soviet Socialist Republic in 1989. The Tartu corps negotiated the returned to its historic convent house in 1996 and began extensive renovations. The Tallinn chapter was reestablished in 2007.

The corps celebrates its anniversary with international gatherings.

== Symbols ==
The group adopted its colors of blue-green-white on February 11, 1907. These colors symbolize auvli! (Fraternity, freedom of spirit, and education) and are used on its flag, coat of arms, and rapier baskets. Its motto is Teos õiglane ja vahvas, ustav sulle, Eesti rahvas! or "The work is just and great, faithful to you, Estonian people". Members are called frater esticus.

The group's "circle" or twisted letter signet consists of the initials of the Latin phrase Vivat, Crescat, Floreat Fraternitas Estica!" or "Long live, grow, prosper the Estonian brotherhood!". It is used on Fraternitas Estica documents and its blankets. Each member must be able to draw the circle with a single line.

The Fraternitas Estica includes a shield surrounded by blue and green flags. The shield is blue on top and split between white and green on the lower half. The blue part includes the phrase Teos õiglane ja vahvas, ustav sulle, Eesti rahvas in gold. The white part, to the left, features the founding date and a chain with sixteen links that symbolize the sixteen founders. The green part, to the right, includes the circle.

The corporation's chairman wears a badge of office that consists of the old coat of arms in gold attached to a ribbon in the corps' colors. A similar badge of honor is presented to meritorious alumni to honor their work. The corps also has an "old man" badge that is the new coat of arms attached to a ribbon. When presiding over the beer table, the old man also wears a large drinking horn around his neck.

== Chapters ==
Following are lists of Fraternitas Estica collegiate and alumni chapters. Active chapters are indicated in bold. Inactive chapters are in italics.

=== Collegiate chapters ===
| Chapter | Charter date and range | Institution | Location | Status | Ref. |
|---|---|---|---|---|---|
| **Tartu Convention** | May 9, 1907 – 1940; 1988 | University of Tartu | Tartu, Estonia | Active | |
| **Tallinn Convention** | mid-1930s–1940; 2007 | | Tallinn, Estonia | Active | |

=== Graduate chapters ===
| Chapter | Charter date and range | Location | Status | Ref. |
|---|---|---|---|---|
| **Alumni Association** | 190x ?–1940; 19xx ? | Tartu, Estonia | Active | |
| **Swedish National Team** | 1946 | Stockholm, Sweden | Active | |
| **Canadian Team** | 1950 | Toronto, Canada | Active | |
| **United States Team** | 1950 | Lakewood, New Jersey | Active | |
| Australian Team | 1957–xxxx ? | Australia | Inactive | |
| German Team | | Germany | Inactive | |
| Brazil Team | | Brazil | Inactive | |

== Notable members ==
- Friedrich Akel, diplomat and politician
- Martin Jervan, military personnel and military doctor
- Hans Leesment, Estonian major general and a founder and the president of the Estonian Red Cross
- Mihkel Lüdig, composer and organist
- Konstantin Päts, statesman and Estonian president
- Otto Pukk, member of the Estonian National Assembly
- Heinrich Rosenthal, writer and founder of Fraternitas Estica
- Jan Treumann, Estonian Evangelical Lutheran Church clergyman and member of the Estonian National Assembly

== See also ==
- List of fraternities and sororities in Estonia
