= Korp! Leola =

Estonian student fraternity

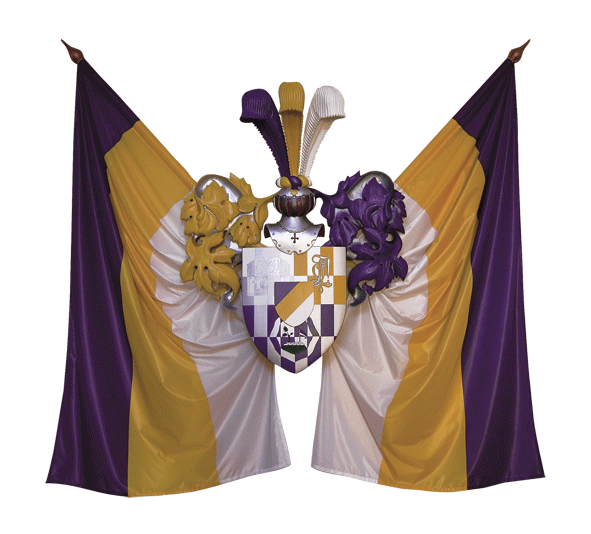
- Founded: 16 October 1920; 104 years ago Tallinn Technical University
- Type: Estonian Academic Corporation
- Affiliation: EKL
- Status: Active
- Scope: Local
- Motto: Age quod agis
- Colors: Purple, Gold and White
- Flag
- Chapters: 1
- Headquarters: Tatari 12; Tallinn 10116; Estonia
- Website: leola.ee

Korporatsioon Leola or Korp! Leola is an Estonian student fraternity or studentenverbindung. It was established in 1920 in Tallinn. It is a member of the League of Estonian Corporations.

== History ==
On 16 October 1920, Tallinn Technical University nine engineering students created Korp! Leola, the first student fraternity in Tallinn. It was established following the Estonian War of Independence; its founders wanted to support Estonian culture, nationalism, and higher education. Its founders were Artur Juks, Otto Laarman, Voldemar Lepp, Oskar Märtson, Mihkel Ollino, Nikolai Pelovas-Põlluaas, Karl Puidak, August Soop, and Richard Tedro.

Originally, the fraternity's membership was limited to students at the technical university but eventually expanded to include other universities. In 1931, it moved into a chapter house in Toompea at Toomkooli 15, which served as it headquarters until 1940.

The technical higher education branch of Tallinn Technical University closed in 1933 and its engineering division was moved to University of Tartu in 1934. Korp! Leola remained in Tallinn and worked on restoring technical higher education to the city. This led to the establishment of Tallinn Institute of Technology (now Tallinn University of Technology) in 1936, along with the revitalization of Korp! Leola and the creation of its alumni association.

Korp! Leola went inactive under the Soviet occupation in 1940 when student organizations were banned and their assets were confiscated. Some members continued to meet in secret, although half of the fraternity's members died serving in the Red Army during World War II or were killed by the Soviets.

Some of the fraternity's members continued to meet in exile in Canada, Sweden, and the United States. In 1955, Korp! Leolo was based in New York and joined the League of Estonian Corporations.

Thirty of its alumni living abroad re-established the fraternity in Estonia on 20 February 1989. It was the first of the former student fraternities to be re-established in the newly independent Estonia. It is affiliated with Tallinn University of Technology. Korp! Leolo signed a friendship agreement with Korps! Lembela on 22 June 1997. As of 2005, Korp! Leola is based in Tatari 12 in Tallinn.

Korp! Leola and other member of the League of Estonian Corporations started the tradition of publicly celebrating The Day of Resistance in 2009.

== Symbols ==
Korp! Leola was named for Leona, the fortress of the 13th century military leader Lembitu. The fraternity's motto is Age quod agis or "Do what you do". Its colors are purple, gold, and white, representing loyalty, excellence, and honesty.

Korp! Leola adopted its coat of arms in 1925. Its shield includes nine bricks to honor the fraternity's founders. There are also nine loops on the rosette of Leola's color torch.

== See also ==
- List of fraternities and sororities in Estonia
