= Korporatsioon Sakala =

Student organization based at the University of Tartu

Coordinates: 58°22′37.02″N 26°42′41.93″E

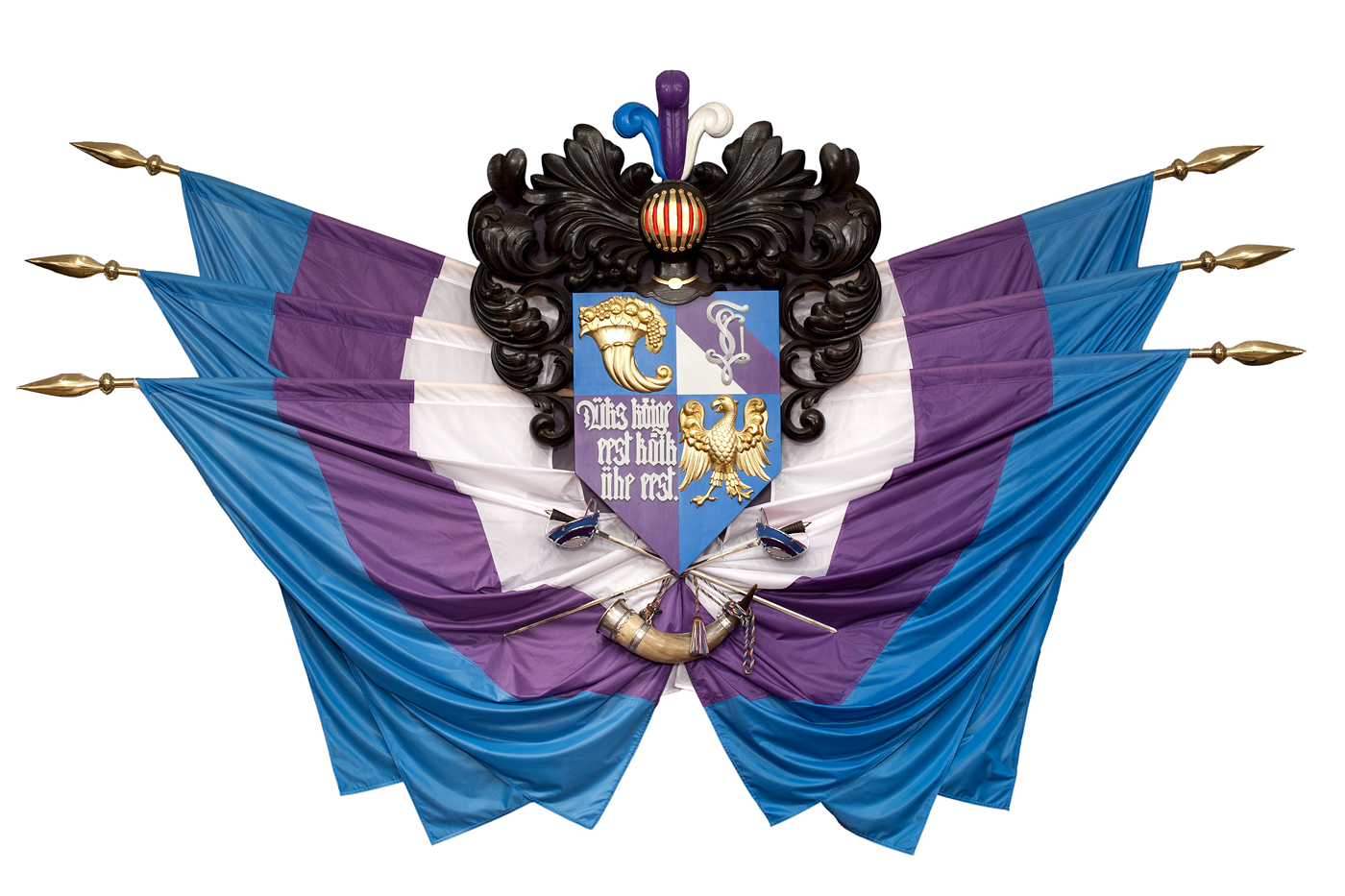
- Founded: November 14, 1909; 115 years ago University of Tartu
- Type: Estonian Academic Corporation
- Affiliation: EKL
- Status: Active
- Scope: Local
- Motto: "One for all, and all for one!"
- Colors: Blue, Violet, and White
- Flag
- Chapters: 1
- Headquarters: Veski 69; Tartu 50409; Estonia
- Website: www.sakala.ee

Korporatsioon Sakala (abbreviated Korp! Sakala) is a fraternal organization of Estonian higher education students. It was established at the University of Tartu on November 14, 1909.

== History ==
Korporatsioon Sakala was established at the University of Tartu on November 14, 1909. Its goal is to strengthen academic bonds and support its membersmorally and materially. With its activities, Sakala intends to improve Estonia’s self-governance, preserve and advance its culture, and support the realization of the ideas of democracy.

Korp! Sakala's convent house at Veski 69 is one of the architectural masterpieces in Tartu, planned by renowned Finnish national architects Armas Lindgren and Wivi Lönn and completed in 1911. The high ceilings, prominent hall, and plenty of space make it ideal for a student corporation.

In 1941 the building was hit by an incendiary bomb, leaving only the walls standing. During the Second World War it was used as a medical station and command post. After the war ended, the building was given to the Tartu Art School. Forty years later, the house was returned to Sakala by the municipality, and with great effort from Sakala's members and support from abroad, it was finally renovated a couple of years later.

During the Soviet annexation of Estonia, korp! Sakala was banned for nearly fifty years. It was officially reinstated with the University of Tartu on May 12, 1989. It is a member of the League of Estonia Corporations.

== Symbols ==
The motto of Korp! Sakala is One for all, and all for one! Its principles are natio, democratia and fraternitas, represented by the colors blue, violet, and white. Its main principles are national loyalty, patriotism, promoting education, healthy living, and physical recreation.

== Friendship organizations ==
Korp! Sakala has friendship treaties with two student nations, Hämäläis-Osakunta at Helsinki University, signed 1929, and Gästrike-Hälsinge nation at Uppsala University, signed 1939.

== See also ==
- League of Estonian Corporations
- List of fraternities and sororities in Estonia
- German Student Corps
