= Korporatsioon Ugala =

Student organization based in Estonia

Coordinates: 58°22′34.88″N 26°42′50.1″E

- Founded: November 10, 1913; 112 years ago University of Tartu
- Type: Estonian Academic Corporation
- Affiliation: EKL
- Status: Active
- Scope: International
- Motto: "Fatherland, Friendship, Honesty"
- Colors: Black, Blue and White
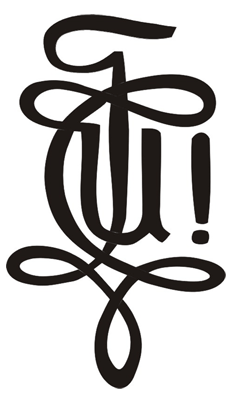
- Zirkel

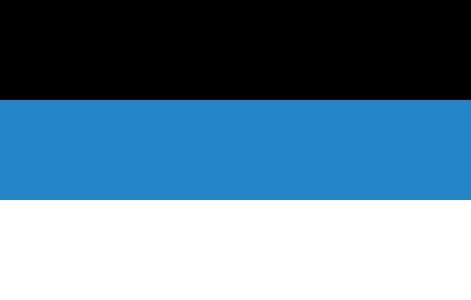
- Flag
- Publication: Volber
- Chapters: 4 active
- Members: 340 lifetime
- Headquarters: J. Kuperjanovi tn 16; Tartu 50409; Estonia
- Website: korpugala.ee

Korporatsioon Ugala (the Ugala Fraternity), also known as Korp! Ugala, is an Estonian student corporation or fraternal organization for college students. It was established at the University of Tartu in 1913. It now has branches in four countries.

== History ==
The first organizational meeting of Korporatsioon Ugala was held in Tartu, Estonia on December 5, 1912. The student corporation was officially approved by the curator of University of Tartu in Tartu, Estonia on November 10, 1913. It was created as a student association dedicated to patriotism, hard work, and honesty. Its founders, recent graduates of the university, included Aleksander Alver, Eduard Kärner, Hans Karu, Jaan Keerberg, Jaak Kotkas, Paul Kuusik, Adalbert Lübeck, Julius Prisko, Alfred Ruus, Paul Ruus, Helmut Torrim, and Richard Villems

Alfred Ruus and Adalbert Lübeck were former members of Fraternitas Estica who were expelled in the spring of 1912 due to an internal rift over organizational priorities. As a result, Korporatsioon Ugala wanted to differentiate itself from the existing Baltic German student corporations. One noted difference was a sense of morality and moderation, including the prohibition of alcohol in its meeting or convention rooms.

On March 28, 1915, the corporation became a founding member of the League of Estonian Corporations, an umbrella organization for student corporations at Tartu. The corporation's entire membership voted to join the army and fight in the Estonian War of Independence on November 12, 1918. More than twenty members received the Cross of Liberty.

After the war, the corporation shifted its focus to academic education to develop nationalism. However, it was one of the most liberal of the academic student corporations in Estonia between the world wars. It also recognized that alcoholic beverages were a part of student life and lifted its ban.

During the 1930s, the corporation's executive convention and the alumni pushed to abolish the traditional academic dueling. This decision was made so the corporation could absorb the membership of two smaller non-dueling student groups, Rajala and Valvila, that went dormant. The corporation also jointly hosted parties with women's corporations.

Ugala'House, 2010

When the University of Tartu's Technical Department was moved to the Tallinn Technical University in 1936, Korporatsioon Ugala established a chapter in Tallinn that opened in the spring of 1937. The Tallinna Ugala chapter absorbed Ugandala, an existing student corporation at Tallinna Technical. In total, the corporation's membership grew to 382, making it one of the largest student associations of the era.

Having outgrown the quarters it has rented since 1920, the corporation built Ugala House, a convention hall at 16 Kuperjanovi Street in Tartu. It was designed by Tartu architect Arnold Matteus, a Ugala alumnus. Ugala Housel was occupied in the fall of 1939. It was the first and only building in Estonia that was purpose-built for a student corporation.

During the Soviet annexation of Estonia in 1940, Korporatsioon Ugala and other student associations were banned for nearly fifty years. In addition, the occupation confiscated most of its assets, including the Ugala House. A large number of the corporation's members were arrested and placed in prison camps, being charged with membership in the Estonian Defence League, which was mandatory at the time for corporation members. Nearly half of Korporatsioon Ugala's members were killed, deported, or disappeared, while 146 members escaped communist Europe.

After World War II, alumni members formed several exile chapters or teams, including one at a refugee camp in Geislingen, Germany. The first official team was established on April 14, 1945, in Uppsala, Sweden. This was followed by nationwide teams in the United States on February 28, 1950, and Australia and Canada on June 10, 1951. For its members in exile, Ugaia was a connection to Estonia. The teams attracted new members and continued to grow in size.

After Estonia's independence, student corporations were again allowed at Estonia's universities and members returned home from exile and the prison camps of Siberian. Members held a reorganization meeting on October 17, 1988. Korporatsioon Ugala was officially reinstated at the University of Tartu on December 17, 1988. It was the first student corporation to be re-established at the university. After a long process, the Tartu government returned Ugala House to the Korporatsioon Ugala Alumni Association on November 17, 1994. The corporation moved to the structure in 1997 and began its restoration.

Although the majority of its activities are now in Tartu, the corporation continues to have chapters in Australia, Canada, and the United States, with Sweden merging into the Estonia group. In 2022, it had 268 members in Estonia and 72 members in three foreign chapters.

== Symbols ==
The name Ugala was selected to emphasize patriotism. Korporatsioon Ugala's main symbol is its flag which is black, blue, and white. Black represents the fatherland, blue is for friendship, and white is for honesty. Its banner or motto is "Fatherland, Friendship, Honesty." The corporation also has a traditional zirkel or monogram. Its publication is Volber.

== Chapters ==
Following are the known chapters of Korporatsioon Ugala. with active chapters indicated in bold and inactive chapters in italics.

| Chapter | Charter date and range | Institution | Location | Status | Ref. |
|---|---|---|---|---|---|
| **Tartu** | November 10, 1913 – 1940; December 17, 1988 | University of Tartu | Tartu, Estonia | Active | (Note: Absorbed Rajala and Valvila student corporations in the 1930s.) (Note: Chapter was forced to close during the Soviet occupation in 1940.) |
| Tallinn | Spring 1937 – 1940 | Tallinn Technical University | Tallinn, Estonia | Inactive | (Note: Absorbed Ugandala, an existing student corporation at Tallinna Technical University, in 1937.) |
| Sweden | April 14, 1945 | | Uppsala, Sweden | Consolidated | (Note: The Swedish national chapter merged with the Estonian chapter.) |
| **United States** | February 28, 1950 | | New York City, New York, United States | Active | |
| **Australia** | June 10, 1951 | | Australia | Active | |
| **Canada** | June 10, 1951 | Tartu College | Toronto, Ontario, Canada | Active | |
| Montreal | 19xx ?–xxxx ? | | Montreal, Quebec, Canada | Inactive | |
| Adelaide | 19xx ?–xxxx ? | | Adelaide, South Australia, Australia | Inactive | |
| West Coast | 19xx ?–xxxx ? | | California, United States | Inactive | |

== Notable members ==
- Arnold Matteus (1897–1986), architect
- Yri Naelapea (1896–1969), writer, journalist, and publisher
- Johannes Orasmaa (1890–1943), general
- Eduard Tubin (1905–1982), composer
- Aarne Viisimaa (1898–1989), opera singer

== See also ==
- League of Estonian Corporations
- List of fraternities and sororities in Estonia
- German Student Corps
