= Fraternitas Liviensis =

Student organization based in Estonia

- Founded: January 28, 1918; 107 years ago University of Tartu
- Type: Estonian Academic Corporation
- Affiliation: EKL
- Status: Active
- Scope: Local
- Colors: Violet, Green and White
- Flag
- Publication: Fraternitas
- Chapters: 1
- Headquarters: Jakobi 52; Tartu 51005; Estonia
- Website: www.liviensis.ee/wb/

Fraternitas Liviensis (also Korp! Fraternitas Liviensis) is an all-male academic corporation in Estonia. It was established on 28 January 1918 in Tartu, Estonia.

== History ==
Corp! Fraternitas Liviensis was established at the by herbology students at University of Tartu in Tartu, Estonia on 28 January 1918. Its founders were Rudolf Hiir, Peeter Järv, Robert Koger, Johannes Pertens, Hans Sang, and Armand Sild.

The University of Tartu recognized Fraternitas Liviensis on December 5, 1919. Its alumni organization was formed in 1921 The corporation joined the League of Estonia Corporations on May 4, 1924, becoming a full member on November 28, 1930.

In June 1940, the Soviets occupied Estonia; all academic corporations were disbanded and their property was confiscated. Alumni of the group continued its brotherhood abroad, publishing the first issue of Fraternitas magazine from the United States.

Six students held a meeting to re-establish Fraternitas Liviensis in Estonia on December 29, 1988. It was officially reactivated at the University of Tartu on March 3, 1989. In The fall of that year, the group purchased a house at Pärna Street 2 for it operations. After moving several times, Fraternitas Liviensis was able to reoccupy its pre-Soviet residence of Jakobi 52 in Tartu in June 2006.

== Symbols ==
Its colors are violet-green-white. Violet symbolized joy, green represents hope, and white stands for peace.

Its coat of arms was designed by member Boris Mirov. It includes a seven-link chain to represent its seven founders, a sun to symbolize identity, and ants to represent diligence.

== See also ==
- Characterization of German Student Corps
- League of Estonian Corporations
- List of fraternities and sororities in Estonia
