= Uuno Öpik =

Estonian-born atomic physicist

Uuno Öpik (a.k.a. Uno Öpik; 19 October 1926 in Tartu, Estonia – 30 April 2005 in Bath, UK) was an Estonian-born atomic physicist most of whose adult life was spent in Northern Ireland and Great Britain.

== Pseudo Jahn–Teller effect ==
In the 1957 paper "Studies of the Jahn-Teller effect. I. A survey of the static problem", the authors (Uuno Öpik & Maurice Henry Lecorney Pryce) formulated the Pseudo Jahn–Teller effect (PJTE) problem for the first time, and demonstrated that this mechanism is a source of instability in polyatomic systems (molecules and solids). This is discussed in [Bersuker], which credits [Opik & Pryce] as an early treatment of vibronic instability in molecular and solid-state systems.

== Life and career ==
Uuno Öpik graduated from Tartu 1st Gymnasium in 1943. In 1943 his father Ernst moved the family to Danzig, and then to Swinemünde and finally to Hamburg. From 1946 to 1948 he studied at the Baltic University. In 1948 the family moved to Northern Ireland, when his father joined the staff at the Armagh Observatory. In 1950 he became a member of Student Society Liivika.

Öpik studied at Queen's University Belfast (QUB), getting a BSc in mathematics in 1950, a BSc in physics in 1951, and a PhD in physics in 1954 with the thesis, "Quantal investigations of certain excitation and ionization processes" under the advisor David Bates.

He worked as a research fellow at the University of Bristol from 1955 to 1956, as a lecturer at the University of Aberystwyth in Wales from 1956 to 1986 and at the University of Reading from 1960 to 1962. In 1962, he returned to QUB, where he served on the staff until retirement in 1986. His doctoral students included Raymond Flannery and Hugh Morrison.

He was one of six children of Estonian astronomer and astrophysicist Ernst Öpik. His son is the British politician Lembit Öpik.

== Papers ==
- Öpik, Uuno; Pryce, Maurice Henry Lecorney (29 January 1957). "Studies of the Jahn-Teller effect. I. A survey of the static problem". Proceedings of the Royal Society A: Mathematical, Physical and Engineering Sciences. 238 (1215): 425–447. doi:10.1098/rspa.1957.0010.
- Öpik, Uuno (1967). "The polarisation of a closed-shell core of an atomic system by an outer electron I. A correction to the adiabatic approximation". Proceedings of the Physical Society. 92 (3): 566–572. doi:10.1088/0370-1328/92/3/305.
