= Villem Raam =

Estonian art historian

Villem Raam (30 May 1910 – 21 May 1996) was an Estonian art historian, art critic and conservator-restorer. His work in documenting and preserving the cultural heritage of Estonia, not least during the Soviet occupation of Estonia, contributed significantly to the understanding of art history and cultural heritage in Estonia.

Villem Raam was born in Pärnu and studied art history at Tartu University. In 1938 he produced his first scholarly work on medieval Estonian architecture. Following the occupation of Estonia, in July 1940 Raam became the director of the State Art Museum of Soviet Estonia; however, in June 1941 he was arrested by Soviet authorities and deported to Siberia. He would remain in labour camp for fifteen years. He was allowed to return to Estonia in 1956 and was able to continue working in his academic field, first as an employee at an institution with the purpose of registering architectural monuments. In 1957 he was admitted and eventually made a member of the board of the Estonian SSR Artists' Union. Subsequently, he dedicated the rest of his life to art history, conservation issues and art criticism. Among his tangible contributions are the restoration of St. Nicholas' church in Tallinn, which he managed to convince the authorities to transform into a museum of ecclesiastical art rather than an initially planned "museum of atheism".

In 1996, Raam was awarded the Order of the National Coat of Arms, 3rd class. Between June 2010 and May 2011, an exhibition his architectural photographs was made at the Art Museum of Estonia to mark the centenary of his birth.

He was an honorary alumnus of the Estonian Students' Society.
