= Enn Sarv =

Estonian freedom fighter

Enn Sarv (13 May 1921 – 22 March 2008) was an Estonian freedom fighter.

In 2006 he was awarded the Order of the White Star, II class.

He was honorary alumnus of the Estonian Students' Society.

== Books ==
- Õiguse vastu ei saa ükski. Eesti taotlused ja rahvusvaheline õigus. Okupatsioonide repressiivpoliitika uurimise riiklik komisjon. Tartu, 1997.
- EV kontinuiteet 1940–1945. [Tallinn: Kistler-Ritso Fond, 2003?]
- Õiguse ja vabaduse vahimehed: Heinrich Marga ja Enn Sarve kirjavahetus 1994–2003. Tallinn: Grenader, 2012. ISBN 9789949448869
