= Ray Flannery =

Theoretical physicist

- Born: January 8, 1941; Claudy, County Londonderry
- Died: May 2, 2013 (aged 72); Atlanta, Georgia
- Education: St Columb's College; Queen's University of Belfast
- Known for: work in atomic, molecular, and optical physics (AMO)
- Notable work: published over 160 papers in that area, 66 as sole author
- Awards: Purser Postgraduate Prize (1961); Will Allis Prize(1998)

Martin Raymond (Ray) Flannery (January 8, 1941, in Claudy, County Londonderry – May 2, 2013, in Atlanta, Georgia) was Regents’ Professor Emeritus in theoretical physics at Georgia Tech. He was known for his work in atomic, molecular, and optical physics (AMO), and published over 160 papers in that area, 66 as sole author.

== Education and career ==
From 1952 to 1958 Flannery attended St Columb's College in Derry. In 1958 he entered Queen's University of Belfast (QUB), getting a B.Sc. in mathematics in 1961, and then a Ph.D. in 1964 under advisors Alan L. Stewart and Uno (Uuno) Öpik. His thesis was in two parts: Some properties of three-electron atomic systems abd and Photoionization of molecular hydrogen.

His early academic career included faculty positions at Queen's University Belfast (1964–66), University of Innsbruck (1966), Georgia Institute of Technology (1967–68), and Harvard University (1968–71). At Georgia Tech, he rose through the ranks from Associate Professor (1971) to Professor (1974) and Regents' Professor (1993), formally retiring in 2007. He also held the following positions:

- 1977: Visiting Fellow of the Joint Institute for Laboratory Astrophysics (JILA) in Boulder, Colorado.
- 1979: Fellow of the American Physical Society (APS).
- 1980 & 2000: Fellow of the Institute of Physics in London.
- 1993 & 2002: Fellow of the Institute for Theoretical Atomic, Molecular and Optical Physics at Harvard.

== Selected papers ==
- 1970: "Semiquantal theory of heavy-particle excitation, deexcitation, and lonization by neutral atoms: I. Slow and Intermediate Energy Collisions" in the Annals of Physics, Vol 61, #2,
- 1997: "Passive millimeter-wave camera" (with Yujiri, Larry, et al.), Passive Millimeter-Wave Imaging Technology. Vol. 3064. SPIE, .
- 2011: "The elusive d'Alembert-Lagrange dynamics of nonholonomic systems" in the American Journal of Physics, 79:9

== Awards and honors ==
- 1961 Awarded the Purser Postgraduate Prize upon getting his B.Sc. at QUB.
- 1997 Elected an Honorary Member of the Royal Irish Academy.
- 1998 The American Physical Society awarded him the Will Allis Prize for the Study of Ionized Gases.

In 2012 the school of mathematics and physics at QUB established the Raymond Flannery Prize "to be awarded annually to the graduate in the School of Mathematics and Physics with the best overall mark".
