= League of Estonian Corporations =

Organization based in Estonia

- EKL
- Founded: March 28, 1915; 110 years ago Tartu, Estonia
- Type: Umbrella
- Affiliation: Independent
- Status: Active
- Emphasis: Male academic corporations
- Scope: National
- Chapters: 12 academic corporations
- Headquarters: Estonia

League of Estonian Corporations (Estonian: Eesti Korporatsioonide Liit, Estonian acronym: EKL) is an umbrella organisation for male academic corporations in Estonia.

== History ==
The League of Estonian Corporations (EKL) was founded on March 28, 1915, by several all-male academic corporations in Tartu, Estonia. Its purpose was to strengthen the relationship between the corporations and to support education about Estonian history, language, and literature. Its founding corporations were Fraternitas Estica, Korp! Rotalia Korporatsioon Sakala, Korporatsioon Ugala, and Korporatsioon Vironia.

Other corporations joined, bringing its membership to 12 academic corporations. Ten of these are based in Estonia. Fraternitas Ucuensis joined EKL on December 1, 1961; it was previously associated with an Estonian university that closed in 1949 and is now based in New York in the United States. Similarly, Korporatsioon Väinla (Wäinla) is no longer based in Estonia.

In June 1940, the Soviet Union occupied Estonia. All academic corporations were disbanded and their property was confiscated, leading to EKL going inactive. It was reestablished in 1990 in Tartu. Korporatsioon Ugala suspended its membership on May 10, 2008, but returned in 2012.

Governance of EKL rotates between its member organizations, in charter date order.

== Members ==
The following organizations have belonged to the League of Estonian Corporations at various times.

- Fraternitas Estica
- Fraternitas Liviensis
- Fraternitas Tartuensis
- Fraternitas Ucuensis
- Korp! Leola
- Korp! Rotalia
- Korp! Wäinla
- Korporatsioon Revelia
- Korporatsioon Sakala
- Korporatsioon Tehnola
- Korporatsioon Ugala
- Korporatsioon Vironia

== See also ==
- List of fraternities and sororities in Estonia
