= Rotalia (corporation) =

Student organization based in Estonia

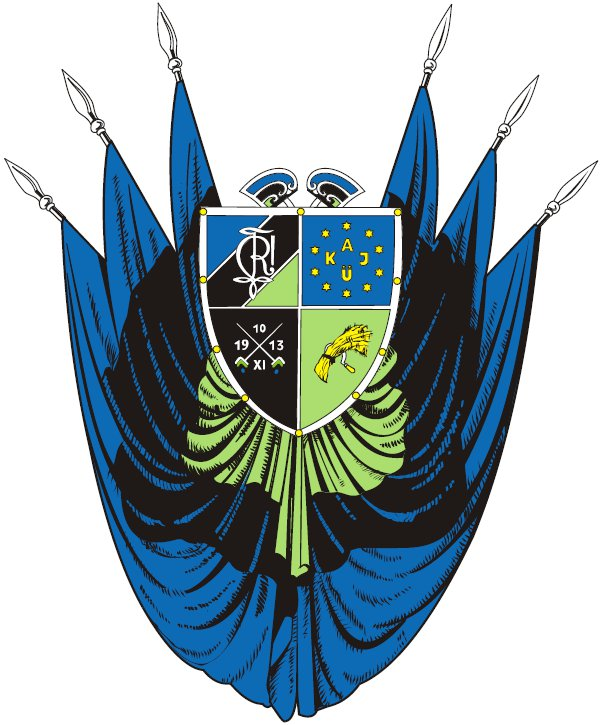
- Founded: November 10, 1913; 111 years ago Saint Petersburg, Imperial Russia
- Type: Estonian Academic Corporation
- Affiliation: EKL
- Status: Active
- Scope: International
- Motto: "Honesty, safety, self-consciousness and integrity"
- Colors: Blue, Black and Green
- Flag
- Chapters: 3
- Members: 600+ lifetime
- Headquarters: Tartu; Estonia
- Website: rotalia.ee

Korp! Rotalia is an Estonian student corporation. Its members and chapters are located around the world.

== History ==
The corporation (Corps) was established on November 10, 1913 in Saint Petersburg in Russia. Its founders were ten students, including Jüri Uluots and Otto Tief. Since 1918, the corporation's main activity was Tartu and Tallinn, Estonia.

After the Soviet occupation of the country in 1944, the corporation continued its activities in exile. Chapters were established in Sweden, Australia, Canada, and United States. Korp! Rotalia USA was incorporated in the United States in 1956.

In 1988, Rotalia was re-established in Tartu. Its emphasis is spiritual development, social development, and physical development.

In October 2023, Rotalia celebrated its 100th anniversary at Tartu College. As of 2024, it has more than 600 members in ten cities, including Tallinn, Tartu, Brussels, New York, Philadelphia, PA, Chicago, IL, Washington, D.C., Seattle, Los Angeles, Ottawa, Toronto, and Vancouver.

== Symbols ==
The corporation's motto is: "honesty, safety, self-consciousness and integrity" (Estonian: ausus, kindlus, iseteadvus, ühistunne). Its colors are blue, black, and green.

== Activities ==
Each year, Rotalia Foundation awards 33 scholarships worth 3,000 euros to the society's members; awarded scholarships total more than 1.5 million euros. The group also holds the Rotalia School for leadership. It also annually celebrates the Estonia day of resistance on September 22.

== Chapters ==
Rotalia has three locations.

- Tartu College, Star 3, Tartu, Estonia
- Pikk 11-2, Tallinn, Estonia
- 198 Beverley Street, Toronto, Canada

== See also ==
- List of fraternities and sororities in Estonia
