= Jaan Treumann =

Estonian politician

Jaan Treumann (11 March 1881 – 3 March 1941) was an Estonian Evangelical Lutheran Church clergyman, educator and politician. He was a member of Estonian National Assembly (Estonian: Rahvuskogu).

Jaan Treumann attended secondary school at Pärnu Gymnasium. He was expelled from school due to nationalist independence activities a few months before graduation, but was permitted to complete his final exams and graduate in 1903. From 1903 until 1909, Treumann studied at the Faculty of Religion of the University of Tartu. He was a founder and honorary alumnus of Fraternitas Estica. He taught schools in a number of local municipalities from 1910 until his death in 1941. He was the city commissioner of Tartu City Council and Deputy Mayor in 1927.
