= Richard Hugo Kaho =

Estonian politician (1885–1964)

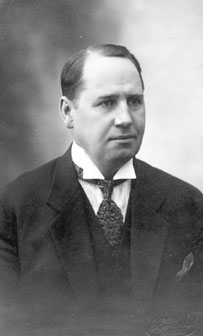
Richard Hugo Kaho

Richard Hugo Kaho (15 November 1885 Pärnu – 17 September 1964 Hamburg) was an Estonian plant physiologist and politician. He was a member of VI Riigikogu (its National Council). From 1938 until 1940, he was the rector of the University of Tartu.
