= Korporatsioon Revelia =

Student organization based in Estonia

Coordinates: 58°22′42.49″N 26°42′37.32″E

- Founded: 1920; 106 years ago Tartu, Estonia
- Type: Estonian Academic Corporation
- Affiliation: EKL
- Status: Active
- Scope: International
- Motto: Üks kõige – kõik ühe eest! "One for everything – all for one"
- Colors: Black, White and Green
- Flag
- Chapters: 4
- Headquarters: Veski 45; Tartu 50409; Estonia
- Website: www.revelia.ee/home.html

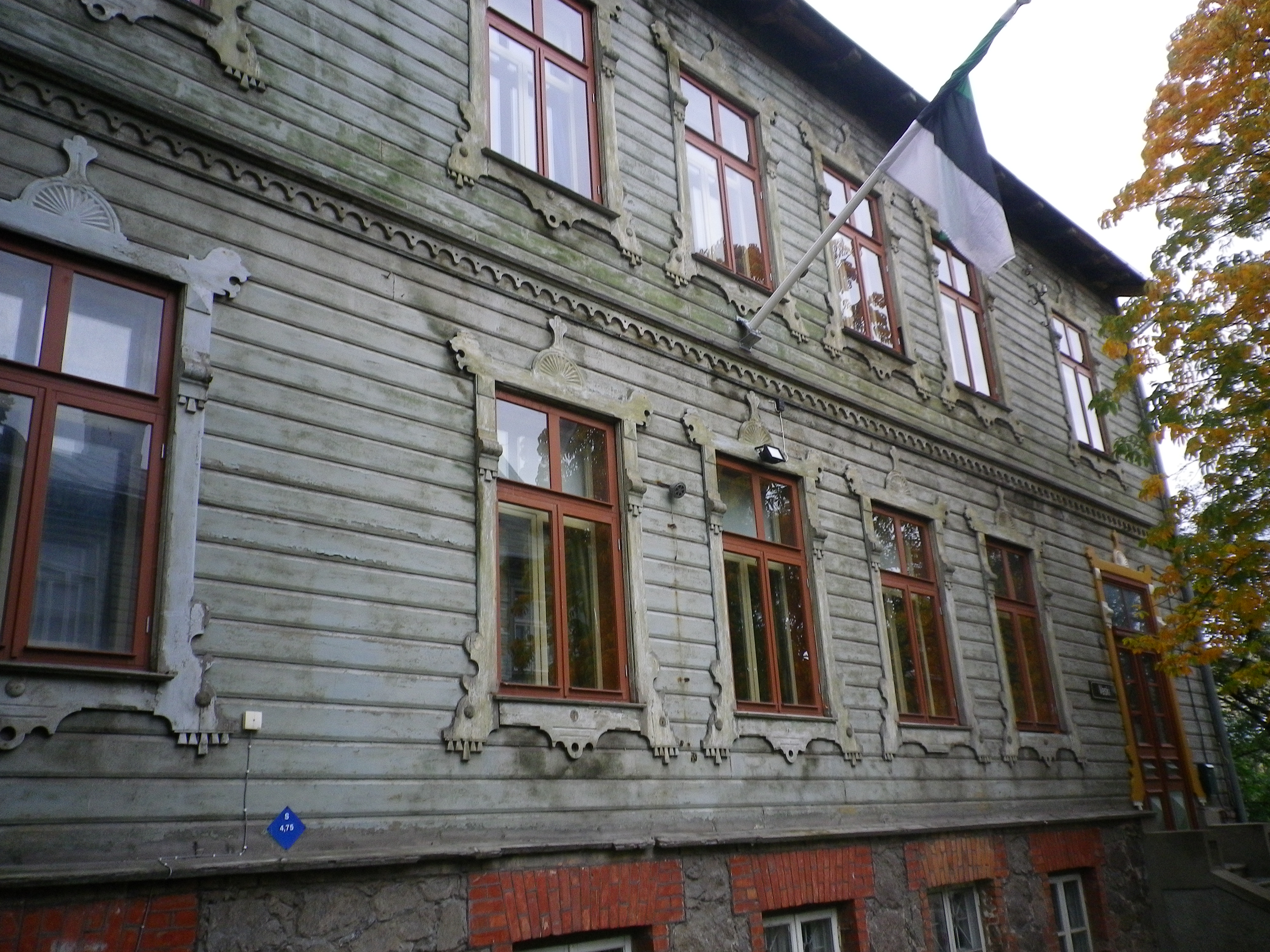

Korporatsioon Revelia (also Korp! Revelia) is an all-male fraternity in Estonia. It was founded in 1920.

== History ==
Korporatsioon Revelia was founded in 1920 as an Estonian fraternity after the Estonian War of Independence. It goal was to create a friendly society for students and to help preserve Estonian culture, language, and people.

Its headquarters and main covents (chapters) is in Tartu, active convents are also Tallinn, Estonia and in Toronto, Canada. It is a member of the League of Estonia Corporations.

== Symbols ==
The motto of Korporatsioon Revlia is Üks kõige – kõik ühe eest! or "One for everything – all for one. The Korps colors are black, white, and green. Members wear a tekkel cap that is green with black and white trim. New members are called foxes; their cap is black. Members also wear a color band or ribbon that is white, black, and green.

The Korps main symbol is its flag which features the organization's colors. Its coat of arms includes a shield with has the date of foundation, its zirkel, and three silver lions with golden crowns. Below the shield is an olderman's horn. The shield is backed by flags and a pair of rapiers.

== Convents ==
Following are the chapters or convents of the Korp!

Convent	Location	Status	Reference
Korp! Revelia Tartu	Tartu, Estonia	Active	
Korp! Revelia Tallinn	Tallinn, Estonia	Active	
Korp! Revelia Canada	Canada	Active	
Korp! Revelia Filisters' Association	Tartu, Estonia	Active	

== See also ==
- List of fraternities and sororities in Estonia
