= Artur Uibopuu =

Estonian politician (1879–1930)

Artur Uibopuu (12 January 1879, in Sooru Parish (now Valga Parish), Kreis Walk – 2 April 1930, in Tallinn) was an Estonian politician. He was a member of Estonian Constituent Assembly, representing the Estonian People's Party.
