= Gästrike-Hälsinge nation =

Student association at Uppsala University, Sweden

Coordinates: 59°51′22″N 17°38′12″E

Gästrike-Hälsinge Nation
- Uppsala University
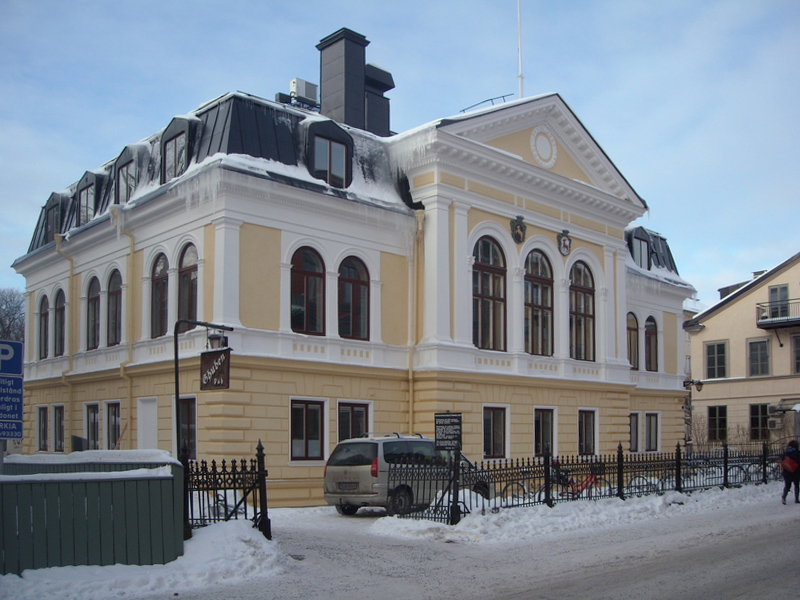
- Location: Trädgårdsgatan 9; 753 09 UPPSALA; Sweden
- Latin name: Natio Gestricio-Helsingiae
- Abbreviation: GH
- Established: 1646
- Inspektor: Anders Virtanen
- Membership: approx. 1900
- Website: www.ghnation.se

Gästrike-Hälsinge Nation, colloquially known as GH, is an association of university students in Uppsala, Sweden, primarily from Uppsala University but also for students from the Swedish University of Agricultural Sciences. The nation first and foremost, but not exclusively, recruits students from the Hälsingland and Gästrikland provinces of Sweden.

== Inspektors ==
Gästrike nation

- Martinus Brunnerus 1663-?
- Petrus Aurivillius ?
- Andreas Grubb 1679
- Johannes Bilberg 1679-1682
- Gustav Peringer 1682-?
- Laurentius Norrman 1702-1703
- Daniel Djurberg 1703-1736
- Magnus Beronius 1737-1745
- Engelbert Halenius 1746-1753
- Lars Benzelstierna 1754-1759
- Lars Hydrén 1760-1789
- Erik Jonas Almquist 1790-1808
- Samuel Ödmann 1808-1811

Hälsinge nation

- Olaus Unonius 1663-1666
- Andreas Grubb 1679-1680
- Henrik Schütz 1682-?
- Elias Obrecht 1694-1698
- Daniel Djurberg 1698-1736
- Magnus Beronius 1737-1745
- Engelbert Halenius 1746-1753
- Lars Benzelstierna 1754-1759
- Christoffer Clewberg 1760-1776
- Johannes Amnell 1777-1789
- Erik Jonas Almquist 1790-1808
- Samuel Ödmann 1808-1811

Gästrike-Hälsinge nation

- Samuel Ödmann 1811-1829
- Erik Bergström 1830-1833
- Johan Thorsander 1834-1851
- Sigurd Ribbing 1851-1866
- Fredrik Emil Sundevall 1867-1875
- Carl Yngve Sahlin 1875-1894
- Hugo Blomberg 1894-1909
- Nathan Söderblom 1909-1914
- Otto von Friesen 1914-1931
- Torsten Bohlin 1931-1935
- Gösta Thörnell 1935-1944
- John Axel Nannfeldt 1944-1970
- Folke Hedblom 1970-1974
- Lars Bäcklund 1975-2001
- Torkel Jansson 2001-2010
- Anders Virtanen 2011-
