= Aadu Lüüs =

Estonian medical scientist

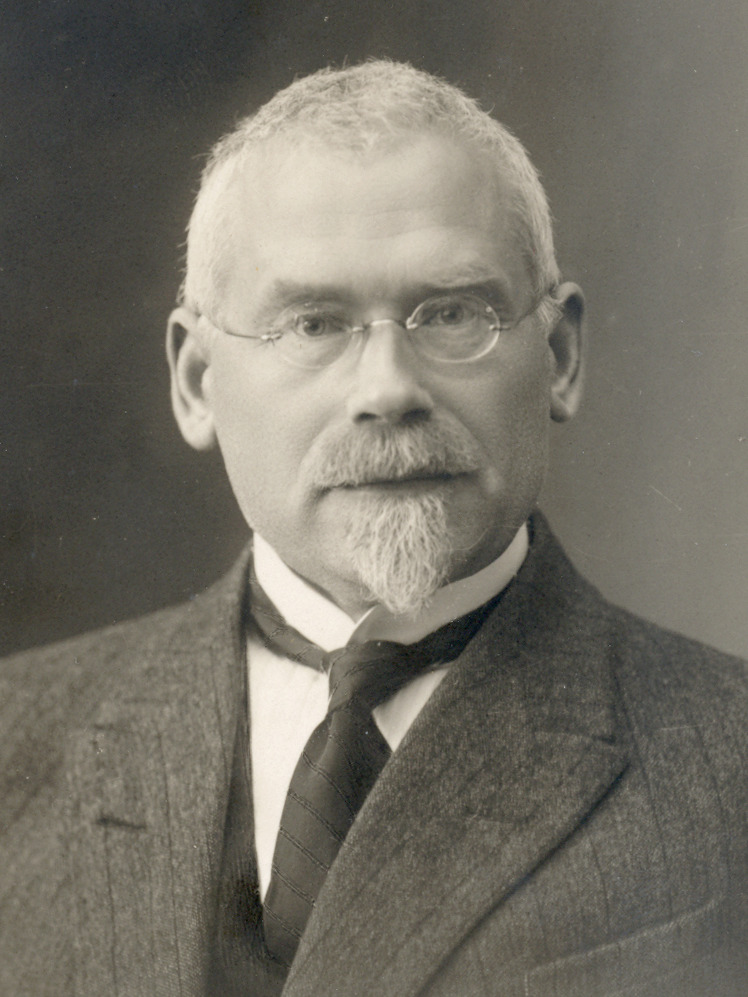
Aadu Lüüs

Aadu Lüüs (also Ado Lüüs; 17 November 1878 Vana-Antsla Rural Municipality, Võru County – 12 February 1967 Stockholm) was an Estonian pediatrician, medical scientist. He was the first Estonian pediatrician-scientist.

In 1907 he graduated from Tartu University in medicine.

In 1925 he was elected professor of the Tartu University. From 1931 to 1934 he was dean of the Faculty of Medicine.

He published over 90 scientific publications. His main fields of research were childhood diseases, children and mothers protection in Estonia and abroad, and eugenics.

Awards:

- 1938: Order of the White Star, III class.
