= Kaarel Eenpalu's second cabinet =

Government of Estonia from 1938 to 1939

Kaarel Eenpalu's second government was in office from 9 May 1938 to 12 October 1939, when it was succeeded by Jüri Uluots' cabinet.

- Kaarel Eenpalu - Prime Minister
- Artur Tupits - Acting Prime Minister (from 11 May 1938), Minister of Agriculture
- Aleksander Jaakson - Minister of Public Education
- Albert Assor - Minister of Justice
- Leo Sepp - Minister of Economic Affairs
- Richard Veermaa - Minister of Interior
- Oskar Kask - Minister of Social Affairs
- Paul Lill - Minister of War
- Nikolai Viitak - Minister of Communications
- Karl Selter - Minister of Foreign Affairs
- Ants Oidermaa - (from 30 January 1939) minister, Head of the State Propaganda Service

== See also ==
- Kaarel Eenpalu's first cabinet (1932)
