= Jüri Teemant's second cabinet =

Government of Estonia from 1926 to 1927

Jüri Teemant's second cabinet was in office in Estonia from 23 July 1926 to 4 March 1927, when it was succeeded by Jaan Teemant's third cabinet.

== Members ==
This cabinet's members were the following:

Name	Portrait	Position
Jaan Teemant		Prime Minister
Heinrich Laretei		Minister of the Interior
Friedrich Karl Akel		Minister of Foreign Affairs
Leo Sepp		Minister of Finance
Oskar Köster		Minister of Agricultural Affairs
August Kerem		Minister of Roads
Johan Sepp		Minister of Justice
Jaan Lattik		Minister of Education
