= Jaan Teemant's third cabinet =

Government of Estonia from March 1927 to December 1927

Jaan Teemant's third cabinet was in office in Estonia from 4 March 1927 to 9 December 1927, when it was succeeded by Jaan Tõnisson's third cabinet.

== Members ==
This cabinet's members were the following:

Name	Portrait	Position
Jaan Teemant		Prime Minister
Jaan Hünerson		Minister of the Interior
Friedrich Karl Akel		Minister of Foreign Affairs
Leo Sepp		Minister of Finance
Oskar Köster		Minister of Agricultural Affairs
August Kerem		Minister of Roads
Otto Tief		Minister of Justice
Jaan Lattik		Minister of Education
