= Jaan Tõnisson's fourth cabinet =

Government of Estonia from May 1933 to October 1933

Jaan Tõnisson's fourth cabinet was in office in Estonia from 18 May 1933 to 21 October 1933, when it was succeeded by Konstantin Päts' fifth cabinet.

== Members ==
This cabinet's members were the following:

Name	Portrait	Position
Jaan Tõnisson		Prime Minister
Vladimir Rooberg		Minister of the Interior and Minister of Justice (until 03.10.1933)
Ernst Heinrich Ein		Minister of the Interior and Minister of Justice (since 04.10.1933)
Ants Piip		Minister of Foreign Affairs
Peeter Kurvits		Minister of Economic Affairs
Johannes-Friedrich Zimmermann		Minister of Agricultural Affairs
Oskar Köster		Minister of Roads
Konstantin Konik		Minister of Education and Social Affairs
