= Jüri Uluots's cabinet =

Government of Estonia from 1939 to 1940

Jüri Uluots's cabinet was in office from 12 October 1939 to 21 June 1940. It was dismissed at the request of the Soviet Union.

== Members ==
This cabinet's members were the following:

- Jüri Uluots - Prime Minister
- August Jürima (died 15 June 1942 ) - Acting Prime Minister (from 28 October 1939 ), Minister of Interior
- Paul Kogermann - Minister of Public Education
- Albert Assor (died 16 September 1943 ) - Minister of Justice
- Leo Sepp (died 13 December 1941 ) - Minister of Economic Affairs
- Artur Tupits (died 28 October 1941 ) - Minister of Agriculture
- Oskar Kask (killed on 13 April 1942 ) - Minister of Social Affairs
- Nikolai Reek (executed on 8 May 1942 ) - Minister of War
- Nikolai Viitak (executed on 24 April 1942 ) - Minister of Communications
- Ants Piip (died 1 October 1942 ) - Minister of Foreign Affairs
- Ants Oidermaa (sentenced to death on 2 July 1941 ) - minister (Head of the Information Centre, until 6 May 1940 Head of the State Propaganda Service)
