= Päts (surname) =

Päts is an Estonian surname. Notable people with the surname include:

- Johanna Päts (1890–1977), Estonian politician
- Konstantin Päts (1874–1956), Estonian statesman, president of Estonia from 1938 to 1940
- Matti Päts (1933–2024), Estonian politician
- Riho Päts (1899–1977), Estonian composer
- Viktor Päts (1906–1952), Estonian politician and lawyer
- Voldemar Päts (1878–1958), Estonian artist and politician
- Voldemar Päts (1902–1942), Estonian cinematographer
