= August Rei's cabinet =

Government of Estonia from 1928 to 1929

August Rei's cabinet was in office in Estonia from 4 December 1928 to 9 July 1929, when it was succeeded by Otto Strandman's second cabinet.

== Members ==
This cabinet's members were the following:

Name	Portrait	Position
August Rei		Prime Minister
Tõnis Kalbus		Minister of the Interior and Minister of Justice
Jaan Lattik		Minister of Foreign Affairs
Aleksander Oinas		Minister of Finance
Karl-Johannes Soonberg		Minister of Agricultural Affairs
Oskar Köster		Minister of Roads
