= Otto Strandman's second cabinet =

Government of Estonia from 1929 to 1931

Otto Strandman's second cabinet was in office in Estonia from 9 July 1929 to 12 February 1931, when it was succeeded by Konstantin Päts' third cabinet.

== Members ==
This cabinet's members were the following:

Name	Portrait	Position
Otto Strandman		Prime Minister
Tõnis Kalbus		Minister of the Interior and Minister of Justice
Jaan Lattik		Minister of Foreign Affairs
August Kerem		Minister of Agricultural Affairs
August Jürman		Minister of Roads
Jaan Hünerson		Minister of Education and Social Affairs
