= Jaan Tõnisson's third cabinet =

Government of Estonia from 1927 to 1928

Jaan Tõnisson's third cabinet was in office in Estonia from 9 December 1927 to 4 December 1928, when it was succeeded by August Rei's cabinet.

== Members ==
This cabinet's members were the following:

Name	Portrait	Position
Jaan Tõnisson		Prime Minister
Jaan Hünerson		Minister of the Interior
Hans Rebane		Minister of Foreign Affairs
Anton Teetsov		Minister of Economic Finance
Oskar Köster		Minister of Agricultural Affairs
August Kerem		Minister of Roads
Tõnis Kalbus		Minister of Justice
Alfred Julius Mõttus		Minister of Education
