= Jüri Luik =

Estonian diplomat and politician

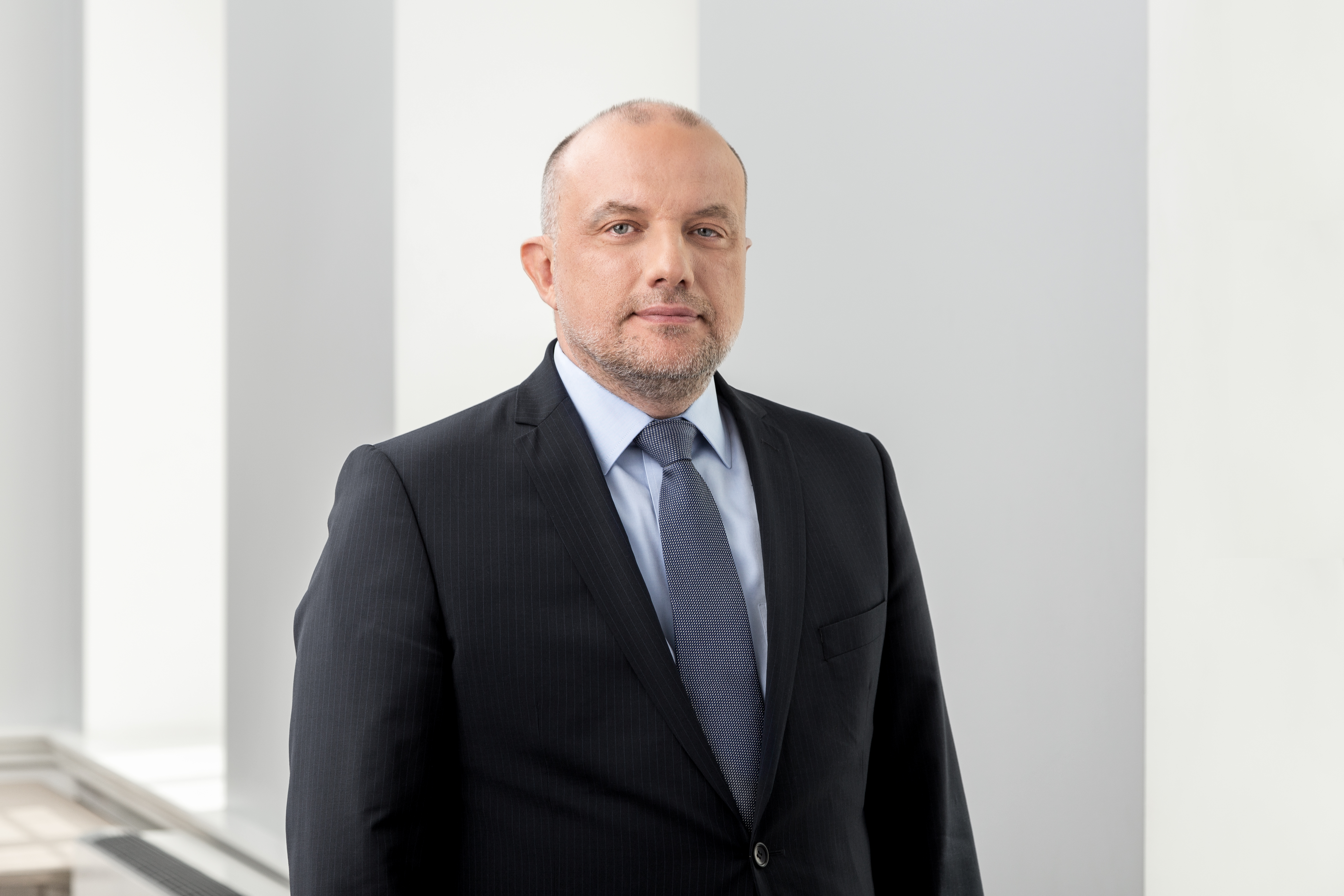
- Jüri Luik, 2017

Minister of Defence
- In office 12 June 2017 – 26 January 2021
- Prime Minister: Jüri Ratas
- Preceded by: Margus Tsahkna
- Succeeded by: Kalle Laanet
- In office April 1999 – January 2001
- Prime Minister: Mart Laar
- Preceded by: Andrus Öövel
- Succeeded by: Sven Mikser
- In office August 1993 – January 1994
- Prime Minister: Mart Laar
- Preceded by: Hain Rebas
- Succeeded by: Indrek Kannik

Minister of Foreign Affairs
- In office January 1994 – April 1995
- Prime Minister: Mart Laar; Andres Tarand
- Preceded by: Trivimi Velliste
- Succeeded by: Riivo Sinijärv

Ambassador of Estonia to Canada
- In office 2003–2008
- President: Arnold Rüütel; Juhan Parts; Andrus Ansip
- Prime Minister: Andrus Ansip; Juhan Parts
- Preceded by: Sven Jürgenson
- Succeeded by: Väino Reinart

Personal details
- Born: 17 August 1966 (age 60) Tallinn, then part of Estonian SSR, Soviet Union
- Party: Isamaa
- Other political affiliations: Pro Patria Union

Jüri Luik (born 17 August 1966) is an Estonian diplomat and politician. He has served as Minister of Foreign Affairs and Minister of Defence, and he has acted as Estonia's ambassador to Benelux, NATO, North America, and Russia.

== Early life ==
Jüri Luik was born in Tallinn. He attended the University of Tartu where he received a degree in journalism in 1989. He was active in the Estonian independence movement at this time. After graduating, Luik became editor of the magazine Vikerkaar for two years. Luik married fellow diplomat Ruth Lausma Luik.

== Political and diplomatic career ==
Luik began working under the Minister of Foreign Affairs, Lennart Meri, in 1989. He served as the Anglosphere expert at the Estonian Institute from 1989 to 1991. He briefly worked as the Head of International Organisations Division within the Ministry of Foreign Affairs in 1991 before becoming its Political Director from 1991 to 1992. He joined the Pro Patria National Coalition Party that was affiliated with Meri.

Luik was elected to the Riigikogu in the 1992 parliamentary election. Prime Minister Mart Laar selected him to be in his government as a minister without portfolio. Luik led a delegation to Russia between 1992 and 1993, Laar made him Minister of Defence in 1993. Luik was then made Minister of Foreign Affairs under the government of Andres Tarand, where he served from January to April 1995. He was the youngest person to serve as Estonia's Minister of Foreign Affairs, being only 28 years old.

Pro Patria lost power in the 1995 parliamentary election, so Luik took a job in the United States. He worked at the Carnegie Endowment for International Peace as a visiting associate from 1995 to 1996. He was then appointed Estonia's ambassador to Belgium, the Netherlands, Luxembourg, and NATO from 1996 to 1999. In 1998, Luik organised the Second Student Forum on Higher Education in Tartu with people he had associated with during the independence movement.

Luik joined a new government formed by Laar after Pro Patria's success in the 1999 parliamentary election, serving as Minister of Defence for a second time. He held this position from 1999 until the end of Laar's government in January 2002. Luik was selected to lead negotiations for Estonia to join NATO on 26 November 2002. He was appointed Estonia's ambassador to Canada, Mexico, and the United States from 2003 to 2007. He was Estonia's representative to NATO from 2007 to 2012, and its ambassador to Russia from 2012 to 2015. Luik left to become Director of the International Centre for Defense and Security, where he served from 2015 to 2017. He then returned for a third tenure as Minister of Defence from 2017 to 2021. He again became Estonia's representative to NATO in 2021.

Political offices
Preceded by Hain Rebas	Minister of Defense; August 1993 – January 1994	Succeeded by Indrek Kannik
Preceded by Trivimi Velliste	Minister of Foreign Affairs; January 1994 – April 1995	Succeeded by Riivo Sinijärv
Preceded by Andrus Öövel	Minister of Defense; April 1999–January 2001	Succeeded by Sven Mikser
Preceded by Margus Tsahkna	Minister of Defense; 2017–2021	Succeeded by Kalle Laanet
