= Jaan Teemant's fourth cabinet =

Government of Estonia from February 1932 to July 1932

Jaan Teemant's fourth cabinet was in office in Estonia from 19 February 1932 to 19 July 1932, when it was succeeded by Karl Einbund's first cabinet.

== Members ==
This cabinet's members were the following:

Name	Portrait	Position
Jaan Teemant		Prime Minister
Ado Anderkopp		Minister of the Interior and Minister of Justice
Jaan Tõnisson		Minister of Foreign Affairs
Oskar Suursööt		Minister of Economic Affairs
Oskar Köster		Minister of Agricultural Affairs
Jaan Raudsepp		Minister of Roads
Jaan Hünerson		Minister of Education and Social Affairs
