= Karjamaa, Tallinn =

Subdistrict of Tallinn, Estonia

Coordinates: 59.452557°N 24.711449°E

Karjamaa
- Subdistrict of Tallinn
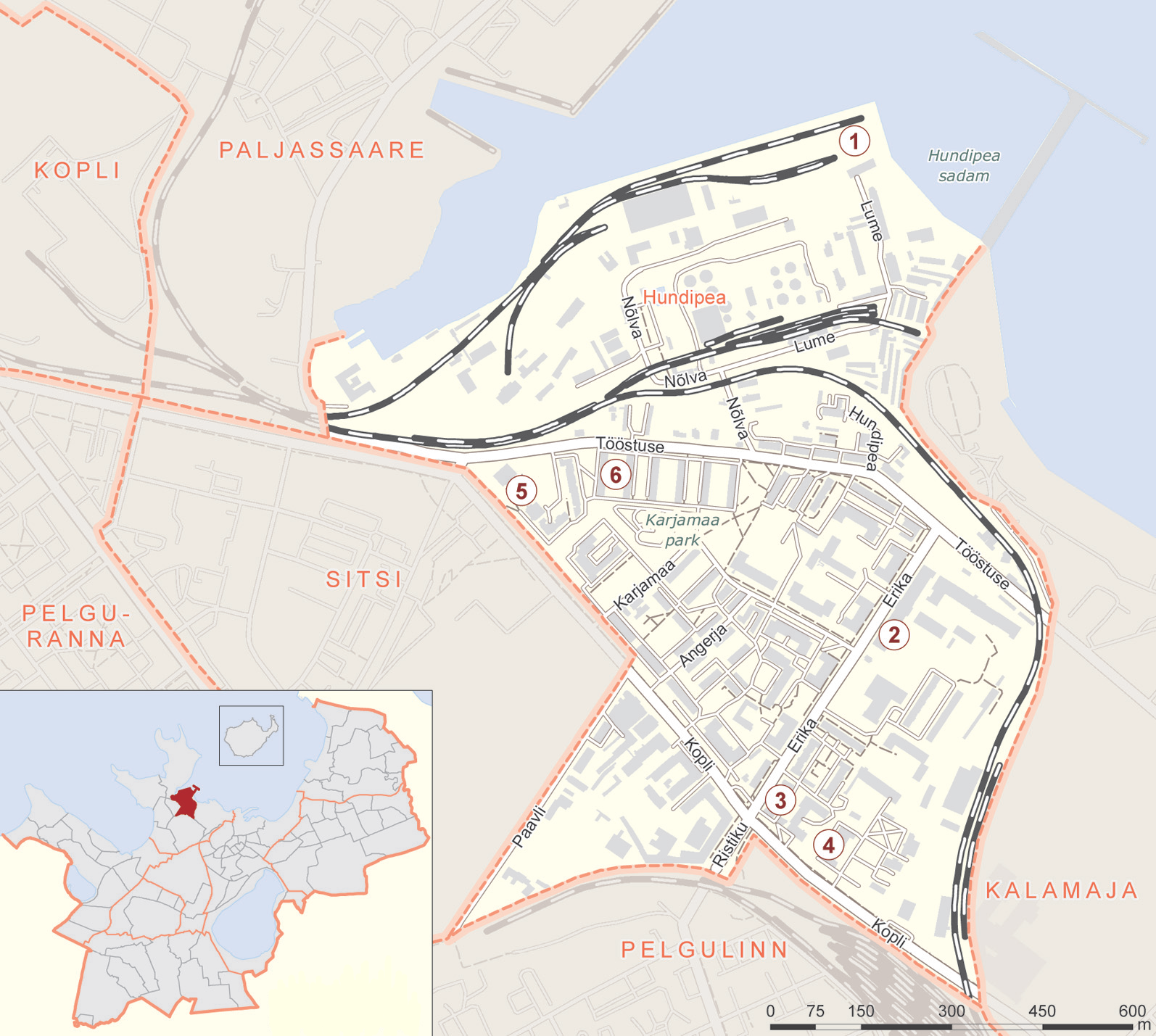
- Map of Karjamaa Streets

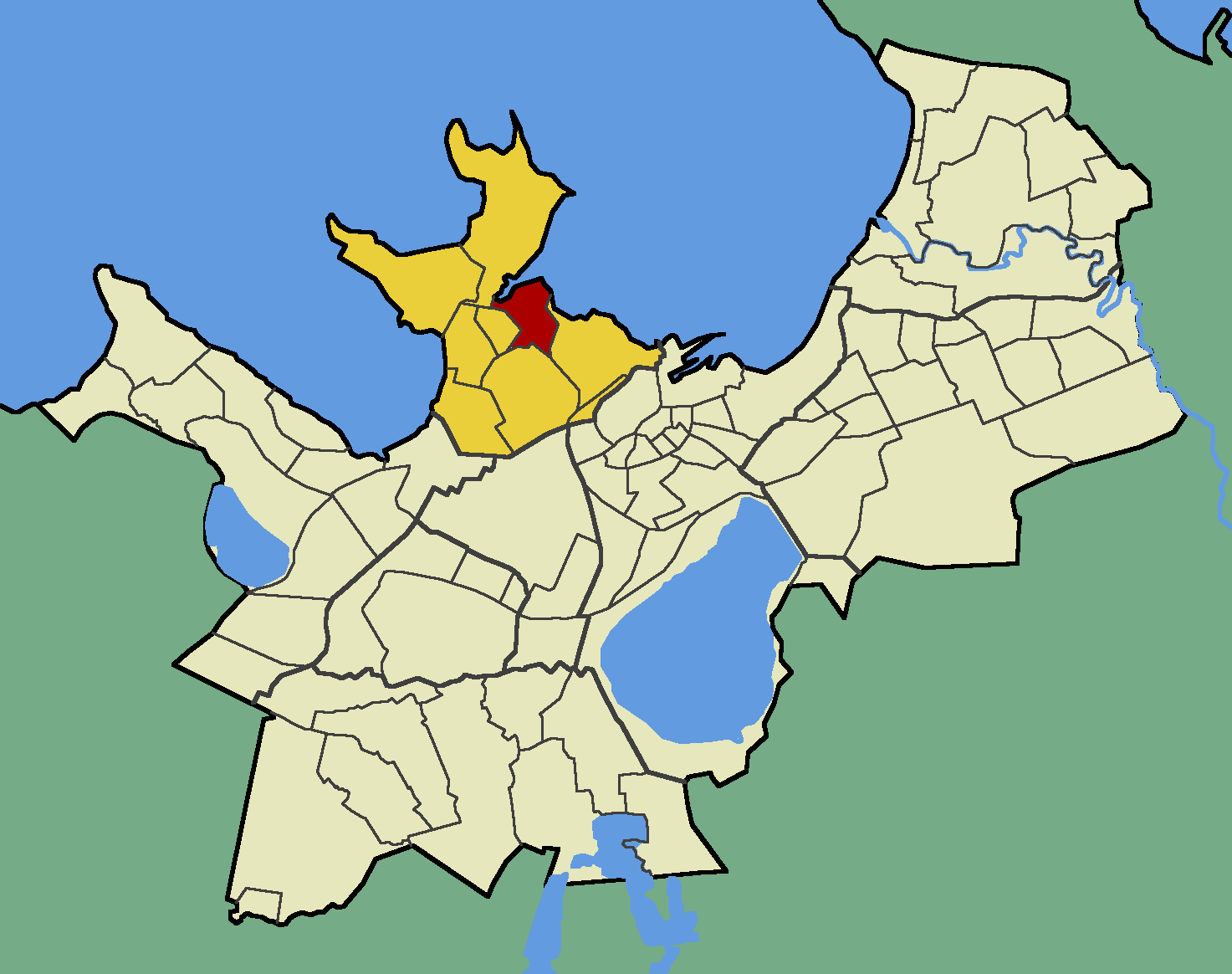
- Karjamaa within Põhja-Tallinn.
- Country: Estonia
- County: Harju County
- City: Tallinn
- District: Põhja-Tallinn

Population (01.01.2014)
  - Total: 5,314

Karjamaa (Estonian for "Pasture", literally "Grazing Land") is a subdistrict (Estonian: asum) in the district of Põhja-Tallinn, Tallinn, the capital of Estonia. It's located northwest of Kalamaja and east of Sitsi, main part is between Kopli, Tööstuse and Erika streets. Karjamaa also includes the Hundipea area and the Mine Harbour (Miinisadam) by the Tallinn Bay. Karjamaa has a population of 5,314 (As of 1 January 2014).

The name "Karjamaa" meaning pasture, was carried over to the neighbourhood because the area was mostly used as a pasture before the 19th century. The first known settlement in the Hundipea area is mentioned in 1374 as Zudenpeyke (Susipea). Karjamaa is also known as Sitsimägi (Chintz Hill). In 1728 a large stone building, which housed the navy hospital for a short time, was built in the area. The settlement was also influenced by the establishment of Kopli cemetery (in Kopli), a new road passed through Karjamaa. The biggest changes in the area took place in the end of the 19th century when the Baltic Cotton Factory with its dwellings were built nearby (the neighbourhood now known as Sitsi). Directly before the World War I the Mine Harbour and war factory "Arsenal" were built in Karjamaa. The Arsenal submachine gun is probably their most famous product.

== Gallery ==
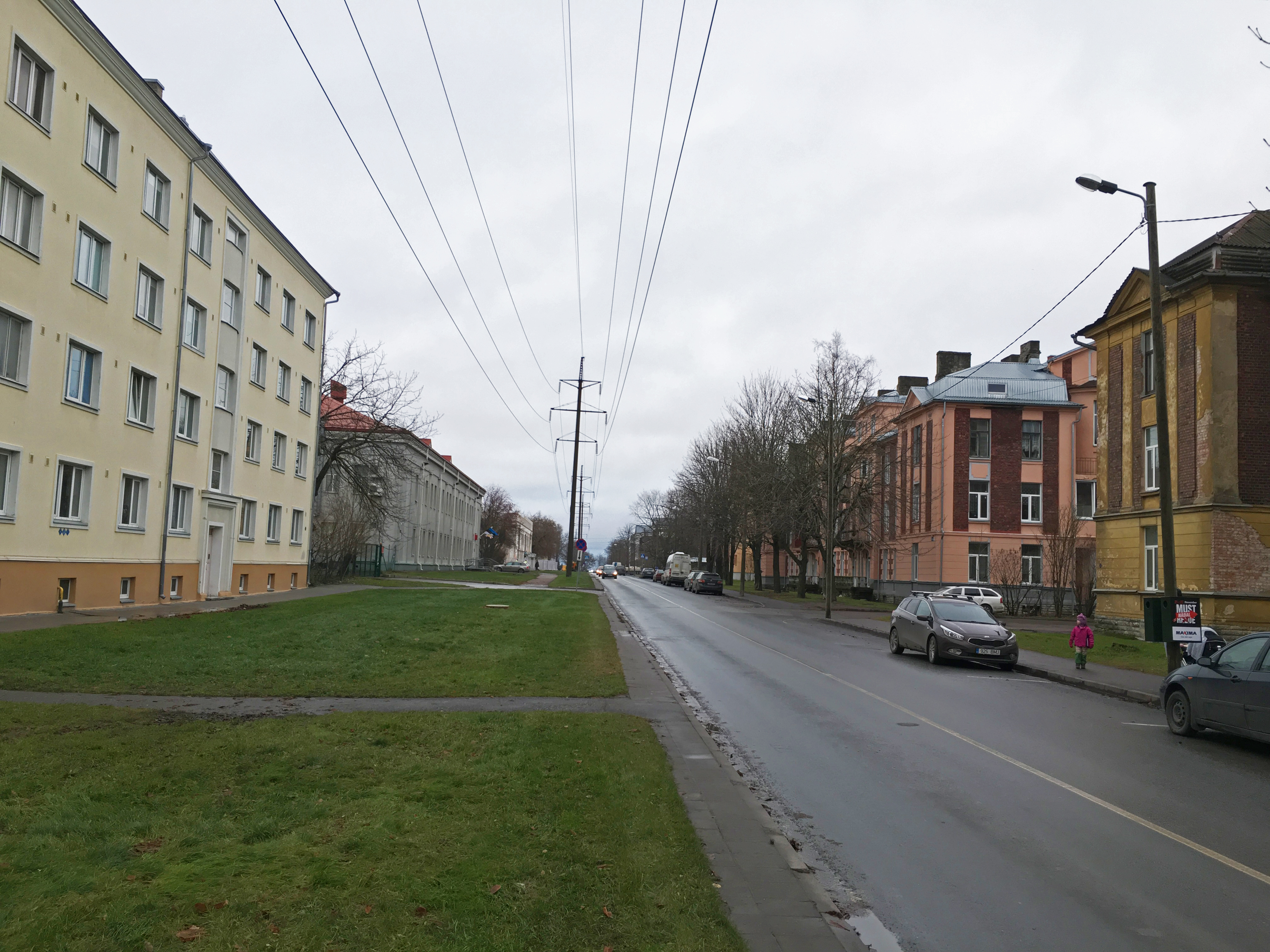
Erika Street

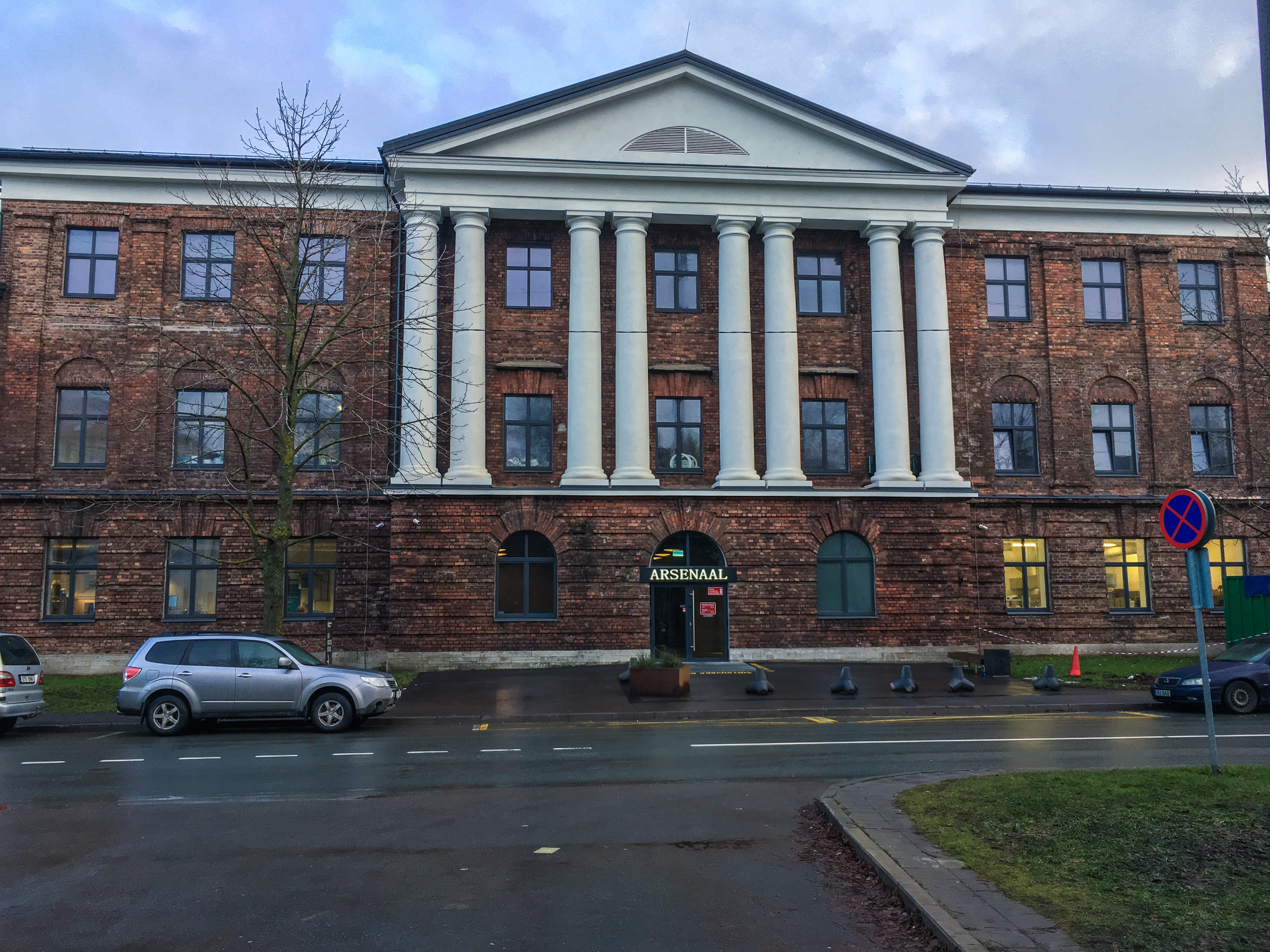
Arsenal Centre on Erika Street

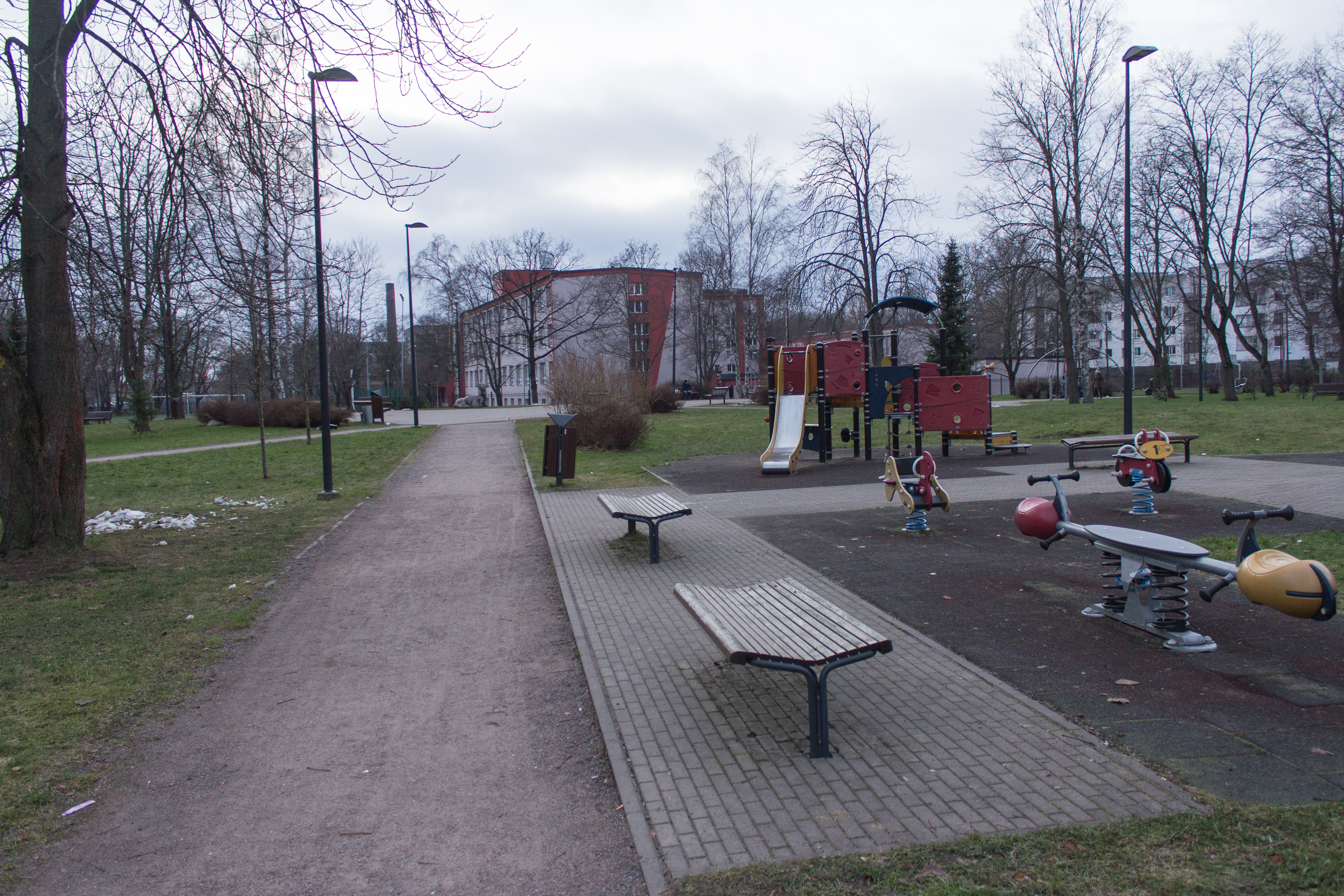
Karjamaa Park

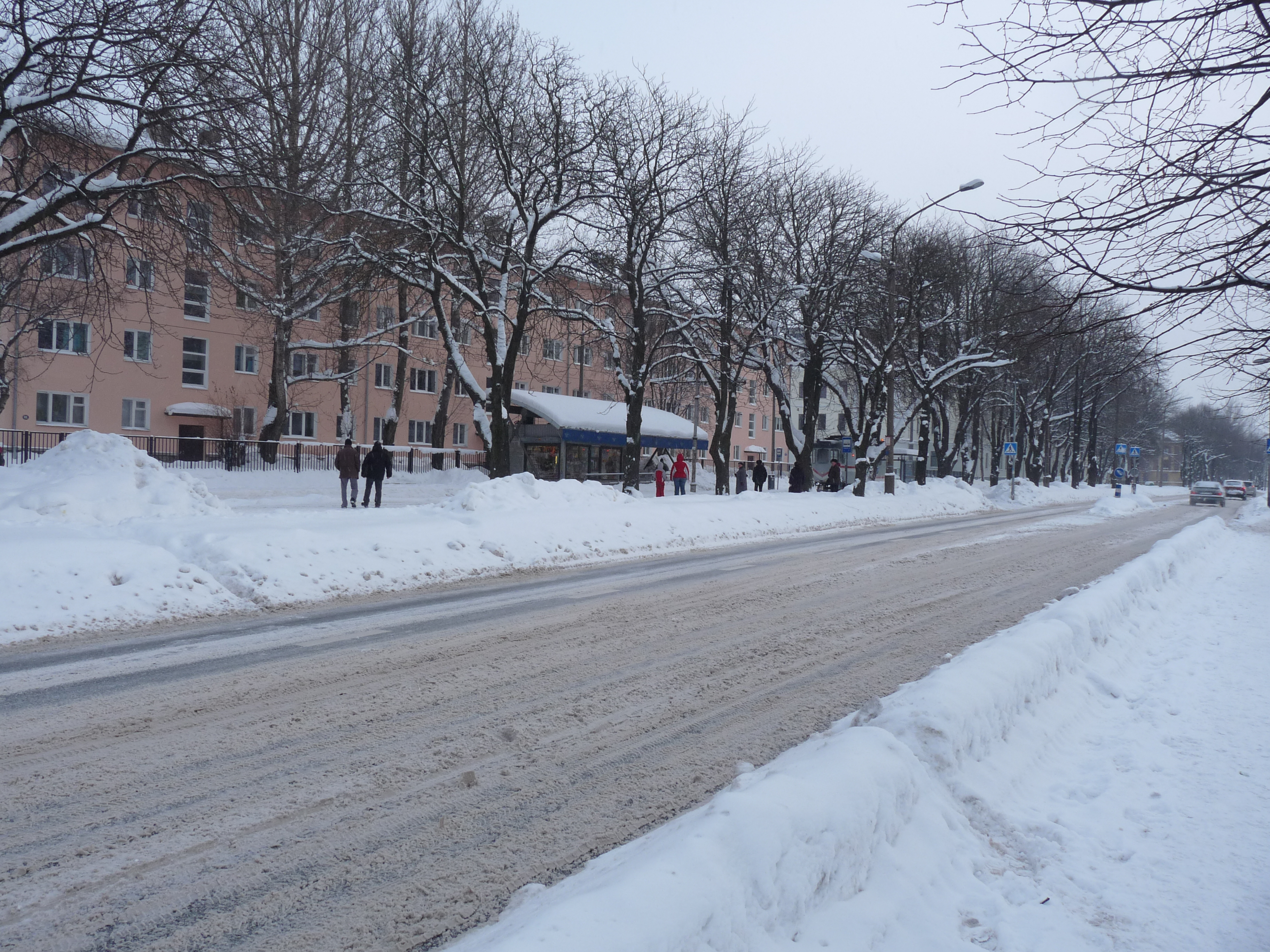
"Angerja" tram station on Kopli street

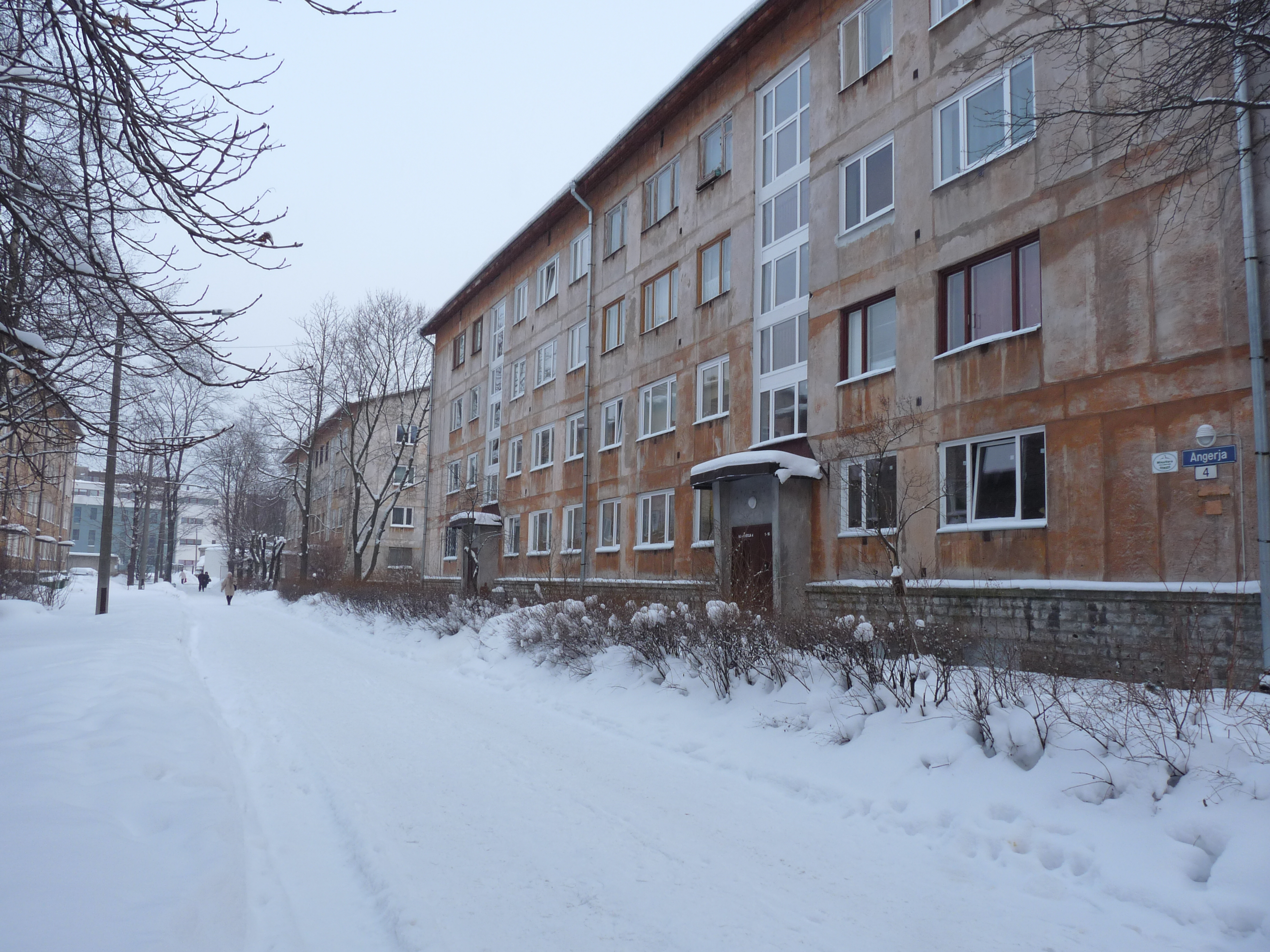
Angerja street

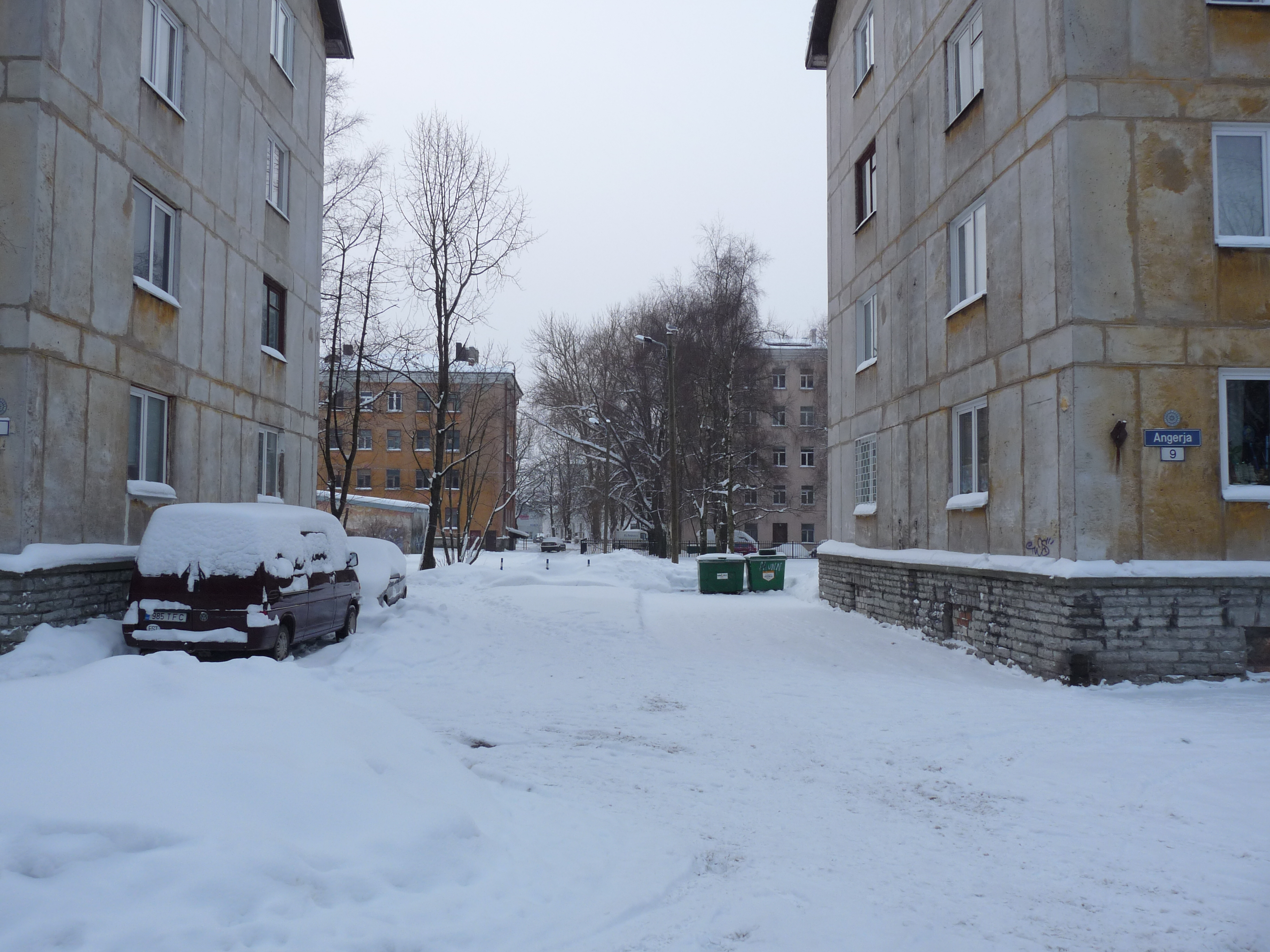
Apartment buildings

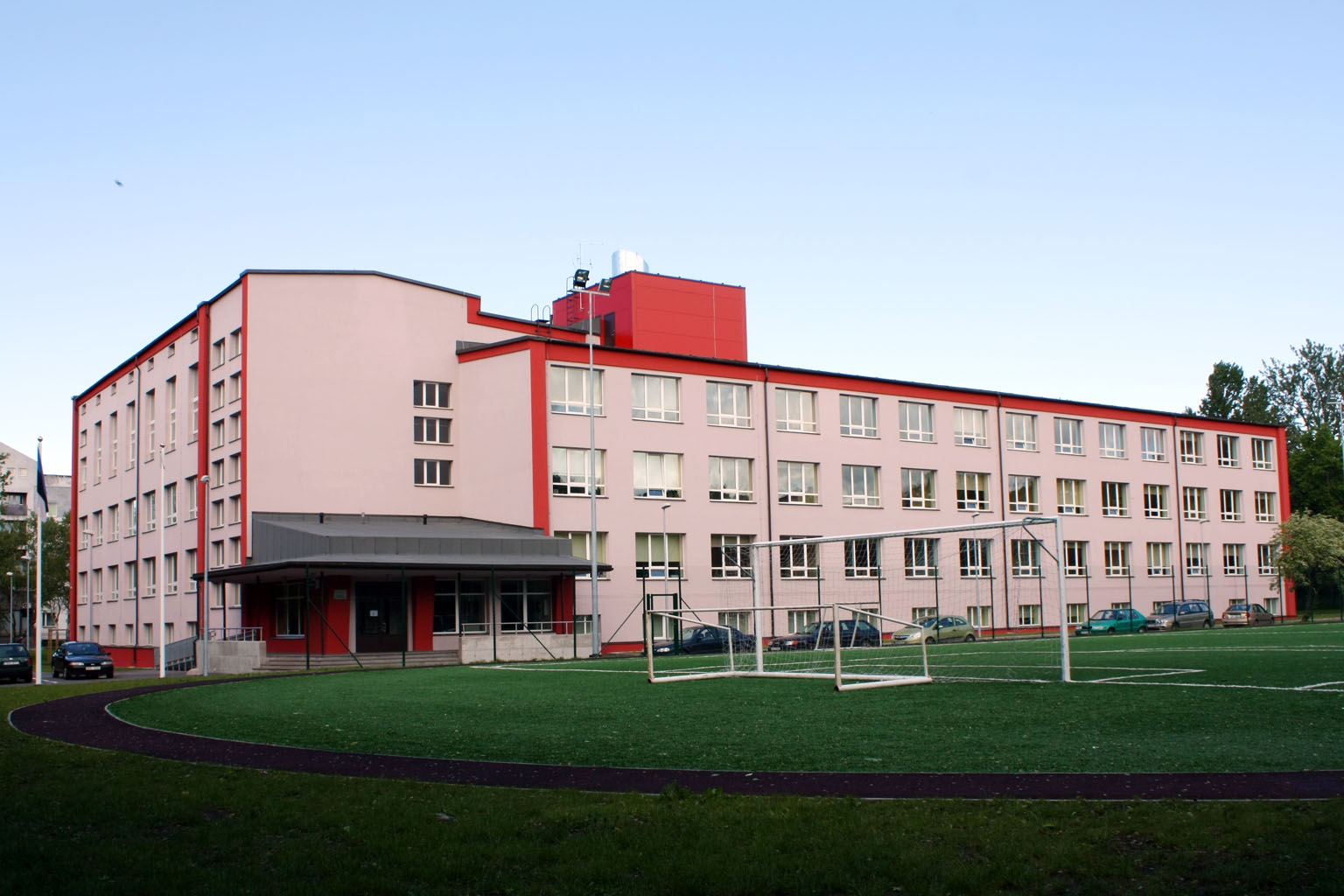
Karjamaa Elementary School

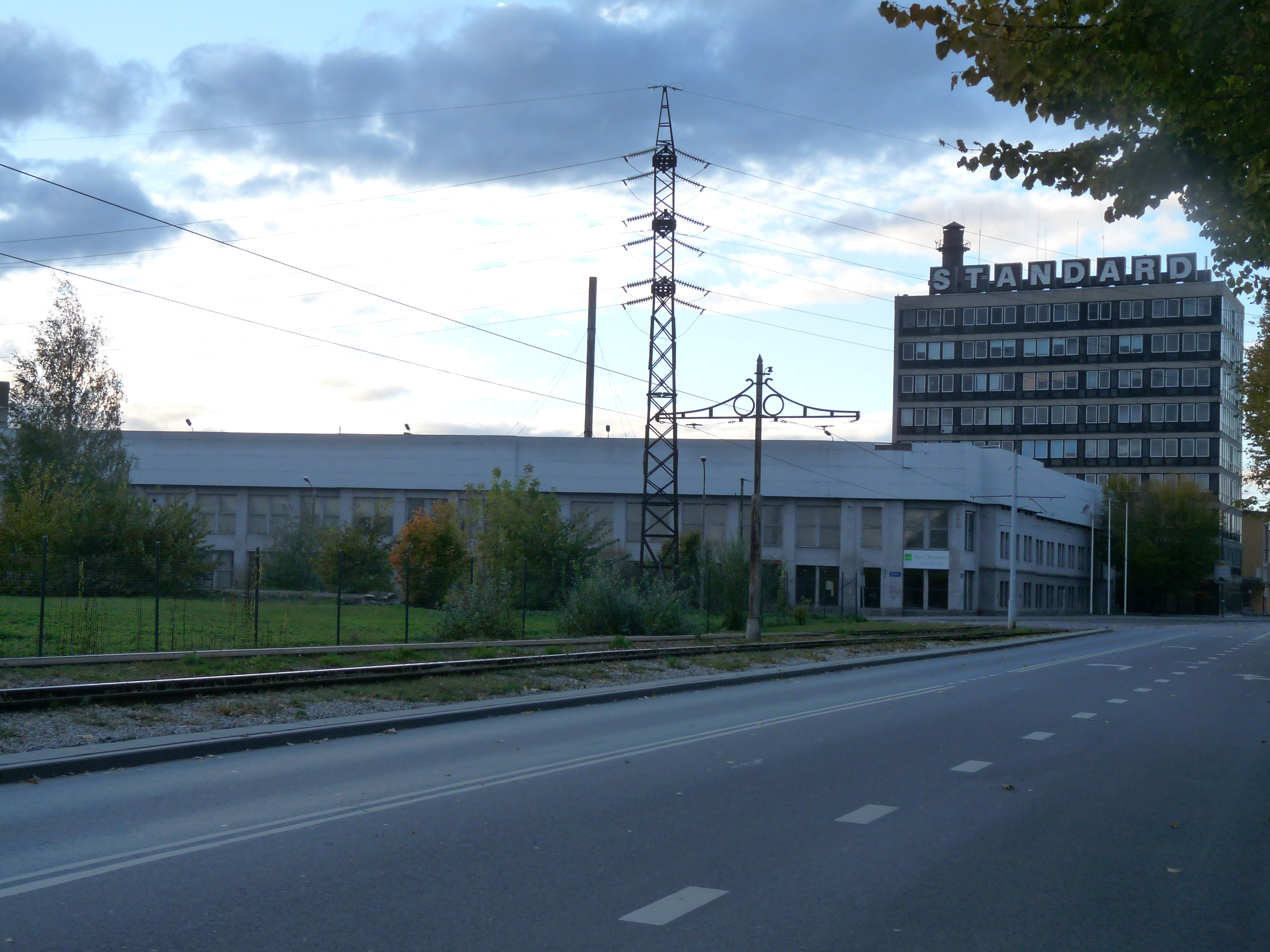
"Standard" furniture factory

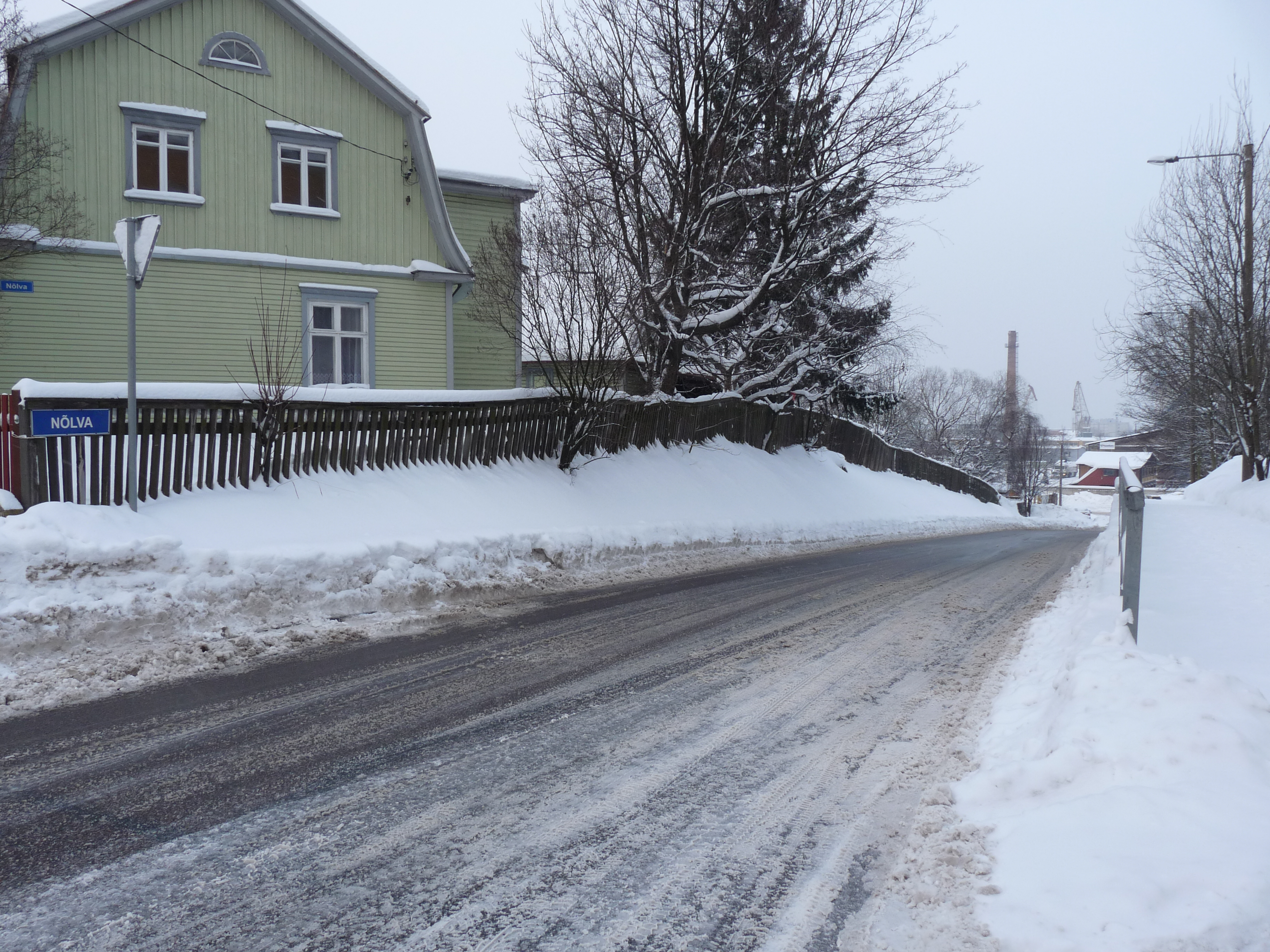
Nõlva street leads down to the Hundipea port.
