= August Hanko =

August Hanko may refer to:

- August Hanko (military personnel) (unknown date of birth and death), German flying ace during WW I
- August Hanko (politician) (1879–1952), Estonian politician
