= Karl Einbund's first cabinet =

Government of Estonia from July 1932 to November 1932

Karl Einbund's first cabinet was in office in Estonia from 19 July 1932 to 1 November 1932, when it was succeeded by Konstantin Päts' fourth cabinet.

== Members ==
This cabinet's members were the following:

| Name | Portrait | Position |
|---|---|---|
| Karl Einbund | | Prime Minister |
| Ado Anderkopp | | Minister of the Interior and Minister of Justice |
| Mihkel Pung | | Minister of Foreign Affairs |
| Johannes-Friedrich Zimmermann | | Minister of Economic Affairs |
| Oskar Köster | | Minister of Agricultural Affairs |
| Jaan Raudsepp | | Minister of Roads |
| Jaan Hünerson | | Minister of Education and Social Affairs |
