= Konstantin Päts's third cabinet =

Government of Estonia from 1931 to 1932

Konstantin Päts's third cabinet was in office in Estonia from 12 February 1931 to 19 February 1932, when it was succeeded by Jaan Teemant's fourth cabinet.

== Members ==
This cabinet's members were the following:

Name	Portrait	Position
Konstantin Päts		Prime Minister
Jaan Hünerson		Minister of the Interior and Minister of Justice
Jaan Tõnisson		Minister of Foreign Affairs
Mihkel Pung		Minister of Economic Affairs
August Jürmann		Minister of Agricultural Affairs
Aleksander Oinas		Minister of Roads
Jaan Piiskar		Minister of Education and Social Affairs
