= Hannes Hanso =

Estonian politician (born 1971)

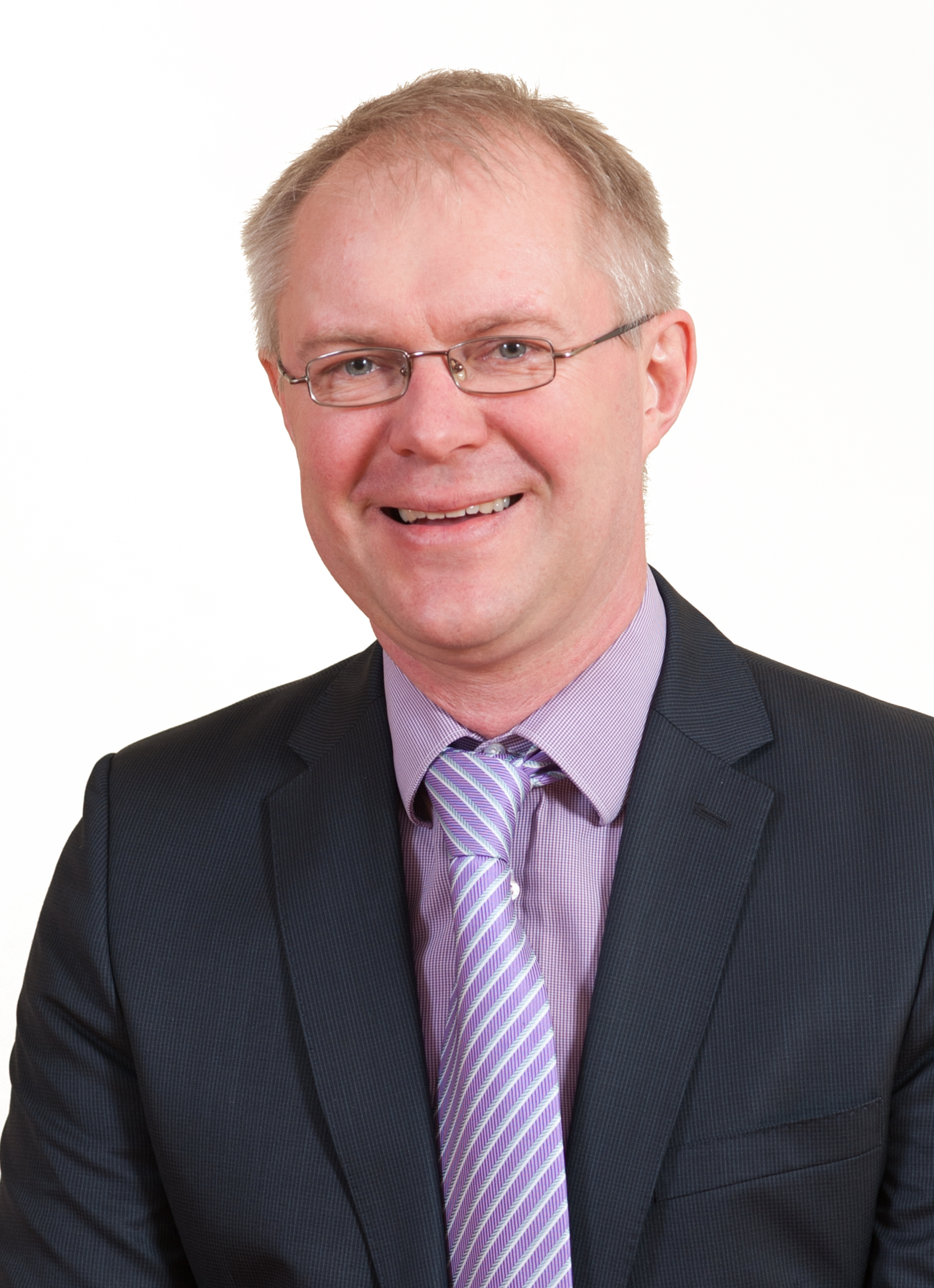

Minister of Defence
- In office 14 September 2015 – 23 November 2016
- Prime Minister: Taavi Rõivas
- Preceded by: Sven Mikser
- Succeeded by: Margus Tsahkna

Personal details
- Born: 6 October 1971 (age 54) Nõo Parish, then part of Estonian SSR, Soviet Union
- Party: Social Democratic Party
- Education: University of Tartu; Sichuan University; West London College

Hannes Hanso (born 6 October 1971) is an Estonian politician and diplomat, a former member of the Estonian Social Democratic Party. Hanso was the Minister of Defence in Taavi Rõivas' cabinet from September 2015 to November 2016. Since 2022, he has served as ambassador to China.

== Early life ==
Hanso graduated from Orissaare Gymnasium and studied special needs education and law at the University of Tartu, the Chinese language at Sichuan University, and transport management at Ealing, Hammersmith and West London College. Hanso has also studied politics and development studies at the School of Oriental and African Studies (SOAS) and acquired his MA in Asian politics in 2005. From 1998 to 2005, Hanso worked as a freelance correspondent for the Eesti Rahvusringhääling and Radio Free Europe.

== Political career ==
From 2005 to 2007, Hanso served as the Adviser to the International Cooperation Department of the Ministry of Defence and from 2007 to 2009, as the Adviser to the Minister of Finance.

Hanso was in the diplomatic service of the European Union in China and Mongolia from 2009 to 2011. He worked as a researcher at the International Centre for Defence and Security from 2011 to 2013 and was the Mayor of Kuressaare from 2013 to 2015.

In 2015, Hannes Hanso was a Member of the 13th Riigikogu and served as Chairman of the Foreign Affairs Committee.

On 14 September 2015, Hanso became the Minister of Defence in Taavi Rõivas' second cabinet.

Political offices
Preceded by Sven Mikser	Minister of Defence; 2015–2016	Succeeded by Margus Tsahkna
