= Uluots =

Uluots is a surname. Notable people with the surname include:

- Jüri Uluots (1890–1945), Estonian prime minister
- Ülo Uluots (1930–1997), Estonian politician
