= Madis Üürike =

Estonian politician

Madis Üürike (born 12 February 1943) is an Estonian politician and economist.

Madis Üürike was born in Tartu, Estonia. Following the re-occupation of Estonia by the Soviet Union, the family fled to Sweden, where Üürike was raised and educated. He received his master's degree in philosophy and economics at Stockholm University and studied for his doctorate at Uppsala University, where he also worked as a university lecturer.

In the 1970s and 1980s, he entered management positions within the construction and property industry in Stockholm.

Following the reestablishment of Estonia's independence, Üürike returned to Estonia. From 1992 until 1994, he was Minister of Finance. From 1994 until 1996, he was an advisor to the Prime Minister of Estonia.
