= Rein Miller =

Estonian banker, financial figure, politician and sports figure

Rein Miller (2 August 1938, Tallinn – 10 April 2017, Tallinn) was an Estonian banker, financial figure, politician and sports figure.

In 1992, he was Minister of Finance. From 1976 until 1999, he was President of the Estonian Ice Hockey Federation.
