= Nikolai Viitak =

Estonian politician (1896–1942)

Nikolai Viitak (14 November 1896 – 24 April 1942) was an Estonian politician and military figure. He was a member of VI Riigikogu.

Viitak was born in Allikukivi in Saarde Parish. He studied at St. Petersburg University and Riga Polytechnic Institute, participating as an officer in World War I and the Estonian War of Independence with the rank of captain (communication chief of the 1st Division). In 1925, he graduated from Technische Universität Darmstadt, then worked as a civil engineer after returning home to Estonia. His wife Helene was the daughter of Anton Teetsov, who was the Minister of Finance in Jaan Tõnisson's third cabinet.

Viitak was the Assistant to the Minister of Economy in from 1936 until 1937. On 4 July 1936, he was elected chairman of the board of the joint-stock company Telliskivitehaset. He was the Minister of Communications from 1937 until 1940.

Following the Soviet occupation of Estonia in 1941, Viitak was arrested by the NKVD in 1941, and was sentenced to death and executed at the Sevurallag Sosva Prison Camp, in Sverdlovsk Oblast.
