= Margus Hanson =

Estonian politician (born 1958)

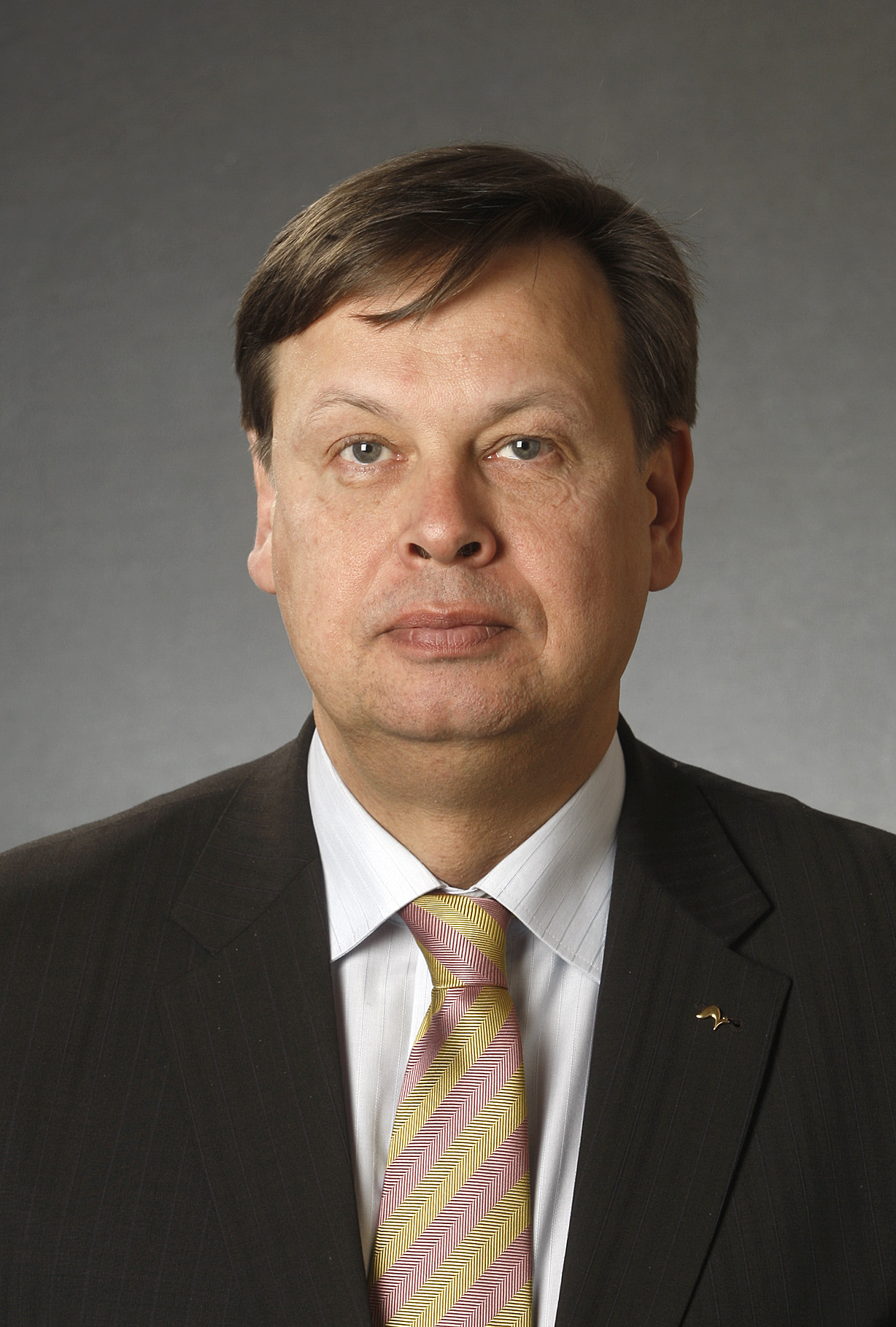
Margus Hanson

Margus Hanson (born 6 January 1958) is an Estonian politician, who was the Estonian Minister of Defence from 2003 to 2004. He is a member of the Estonian Reform Party.

== Career ==
Hanson was born in Tartu. Between 1997 and 2003, he was a Vice-Mayor of Tartu. He has been a member of Riigikogu since 2004 and was the defense minister of Estonia from 2003 until 2004.

== External sources ==
- CV in English

Political offices
Preceded by Sven Mikser	Estonian Minister of Defence; 2003–2004	Succeeded by Jaak Jõerüüt
