= Konstantin Päts's fourth cabinet =

Government of Estonia from 1932 to 1933

Konstantin Päts's fourth cabinet was in office in Estonia from 1 November 1932 to 18 May 1933, when it was succeeded by Jaan Tõnisson's fourth cabinet.

== Members ==
This cabinet's members were the following:

Name	Portrait	Position
Konstantin Päts		Prime Minister
Ado Anderkopp		Minister of the Interior and Minister of Justice
August Rei		Minister of Foreign Affairs
August Jürmann		Minister of Economic Affairs
Artur Tupits		Minister of Agricultural Affairs
Leopold Johanson		Minister of Roads
Hugo Villi Kukke		Minister of Education and Social Affairs
