= Jaak Jõerüüt =

Estonian writer and politician

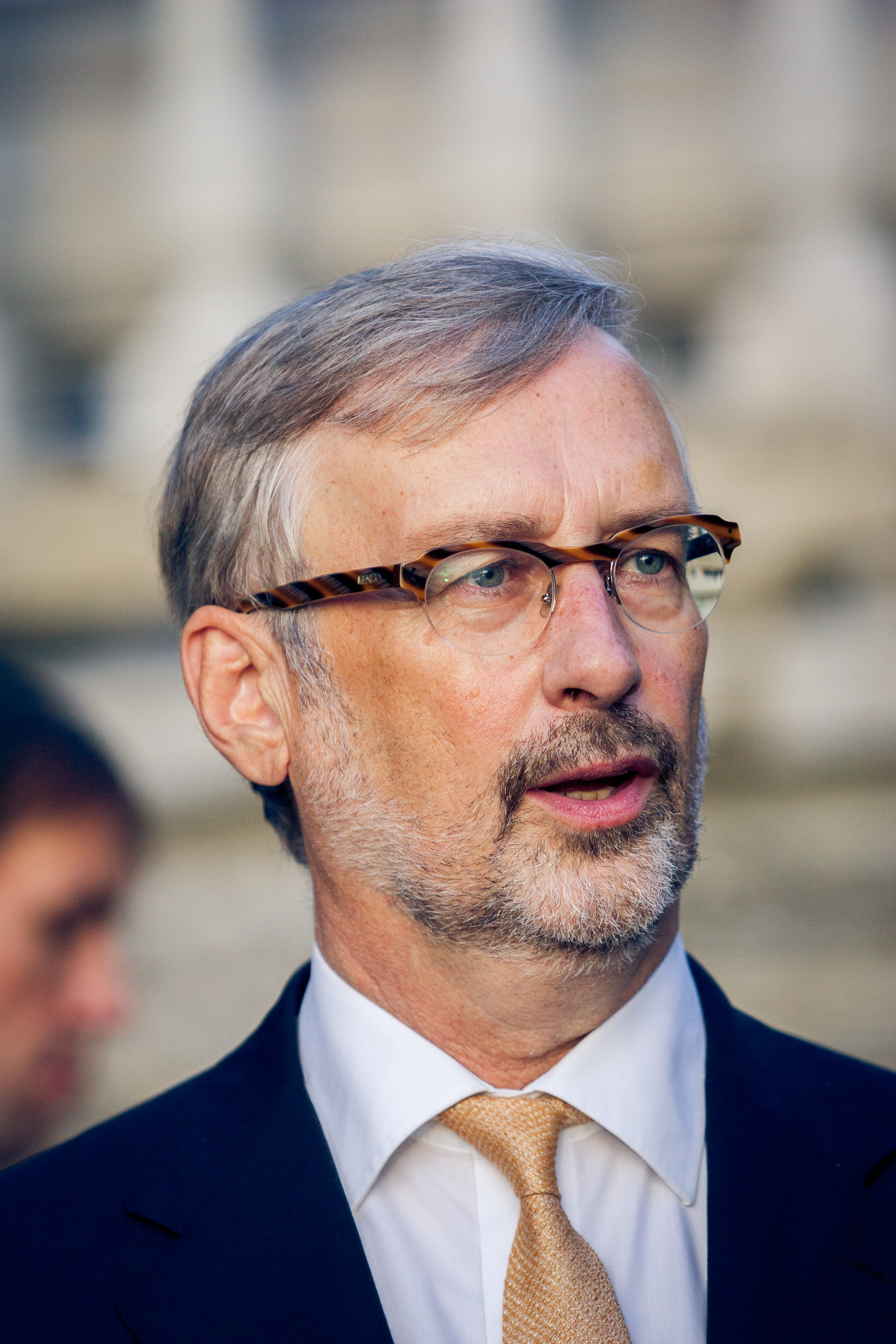
- Jaak Jõerüüt in 2012.

Minister of Defence
- In office November 2004 – 10 October 2005
- Prime Minister: Juhan Parts; Andrus Ansip
- Preceded by: Margus Hanson
- Succeeded by: Jürgen Ligi

Personal details
- Born: 9 December 1947 (age 78) Tallinn, then part of Estonian SSR, Soviet Union
- Party: Reform Party

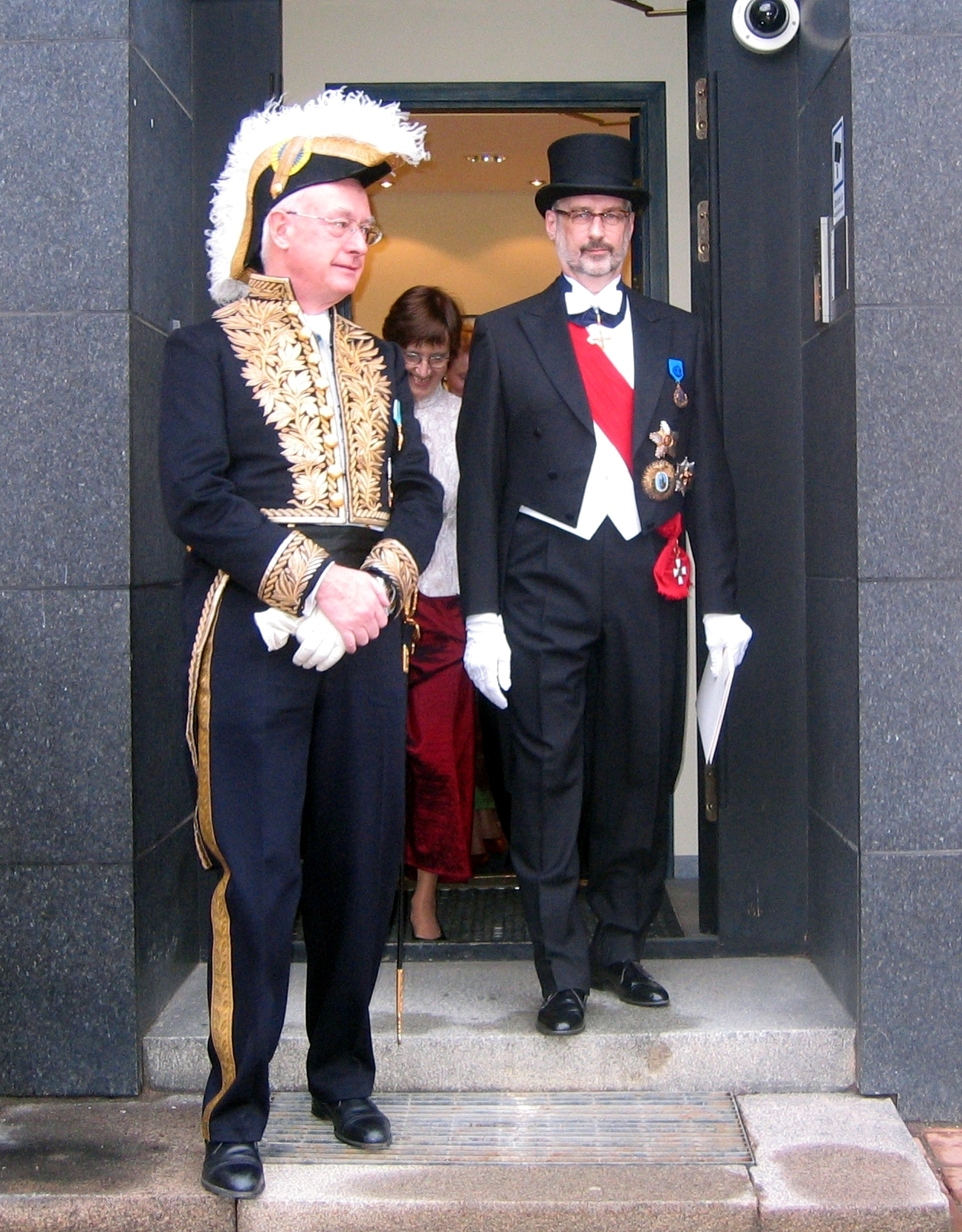
Swedish diplomat Sven Hirdman in diplomatic uniform with ambassador Jaak Jõerüüt of Estonia in white tie, and top hat (2011)

Jaak Jõerüüt (born 9 December 1947) is an Estonian writer and politician. He was the defense minister of Estonia from November 2004 to 10 October 2005.

Jõerüüt first came to political prominence when he became one of the voters for the Estonian restoration of Independence. He was then appointed to be Minister of Defence in November 2004 in Juhan Parts's government. When Parts resigned in April 2005, Jaak Jõerüüt was one of the few ministers retained in Andrus Ansip's government.

In September 2005, Jõerüüt resigned voluntarily over the so-called "T-Shirt Affair". (A T-shirt was produced with a list of the names of several Estonian politicians, including Jõerüüt, who are former members of the communist party; it was headed "Commies into the Oven!") At a soccer match, this was worn by several people who were in the employment of his ministry. Jõerüüt was succeeded by Jürgen Ligi.

Jõerüüt previously served as Estonia's ambassador to the United Nations in 2004. He served as ambassador to Italy and Malta from 1998 through 2002, and ambassador to Cyprus from 1999 through 2004. From 1993 to 1997, Jõerüüt was ambassador to Finland and from 2006 to 2010 to Latvia and now to Sweden from 2011 to 2014.

Political offices
Preceded by Margus Hanson	Minister of Defence; 2004–2005	Succeeded by Jürgen Ligi
Diplomatic posts
Preceded by Lennart Meri	Ambassador of Estonia to Finland; 1993–1997	Succeeded by Mati Vaarmann
Preceded by Office created	Ambassador of Estonia to Italy, Malta and Cyprus; 1998–2002	Succeeded by Jüri Seilenthal
Preceded by Merle Pajula	Permanent Representative of Estonia to the United Nations; 2004	Succeeded by Tiina Intelmann
Preceded by Toomas Lukk	Ambassador of Estonia to Latvia; 2006–2010	Succeeded by Mati Vaarmann
Preceded by Alar Streimann	Ambassador of Estonia to Sweden; 2011–2014	Succeeded by
