= Minister of Defence (Estonia) =

Estonian cabinet position

Minister of Defence of Estonia
- Eesti kaitseminister
- Standard of the Minister of Defence

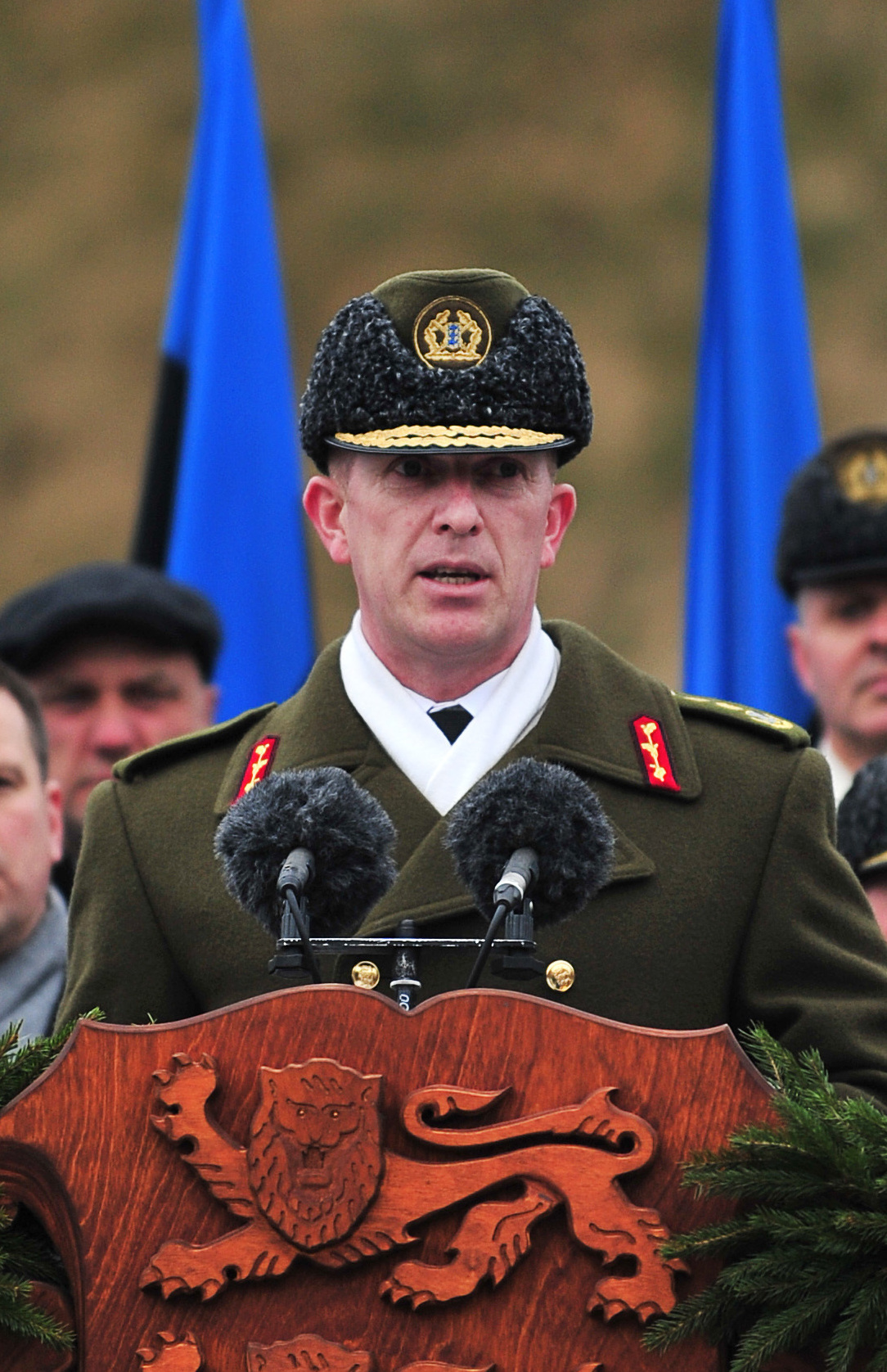
- Incumbent; Martin Herem since 16 September 2026
- Ministry of Defence
- Appointer: Prime Minister of Estonia

The Minister of Defence (Estonian: Kaitseminister) is the senior minister at the Ministry of Defence (Estonian: Kaitseministeerium) in the Estonian Government. The minister is one of the most important members of the Estonian government, with responsibility for coordinating the governments policies on national defence and the military forces. The defence minister is chosen by the prime minister as a part of the government.

When the position was originally established in 1918, it was called the minister of war (Sõjaminister). The post was renamed minister of defence on April 1, 1929, but would change back to minister of war in 1937. Though the name of the position, and subsequently the ministry, was changed, the main responsibilities of the position remained virtually same.

Since Estonia regained its independence in 1991 the post has been known as the minister of defence.

== List of ministers ==
=== 1918 to 1929 (Minister of War) ===
Name	Took office	Left office	Party
Andres Larka	February 24, 1918	November 27, 1918	Independent
Konstantin Päts	November 27, 1918	May 8, 1919	Rural League
Otto Strandman	May 8, 1919	November 18, 1919	Estonian Labour Party
August Johannes Hanko	November 18, 1919	July 28, 1920	Independent
Aleksander Tõnisson	July 28, 1920	October 26, 1920	Independent
Ants Piip	October 26, 1920	January 25, 1921	Estonian Labour Party
Jaan Soots	January 25, 1921	August 2, 1923	Farmers' Assemblies
Ado Anderkopp	August 2, 1923	February 19, 1924	Estonian Labour Party
Oskar Amberg	March 26, 1924	October 18, 1924	Christian People's Party
Hans Kurvits	November 11, 1924	November 26, 1924	Independent
Jaan Soots (2nd time)	December 16, 1924	March 4, 1927	Farmers' Assemblies
Nikolai Reek	March 4, 1927	December 4, 1928	Independent
Mihkel Juhkam	December 4, 1928	March 31, 1929	Estonian Labour Party

=== 1929 to 1937 (Minister of Defence) ===
Name	Took office	Left office	Party
Mihkel Juhkam	April 1, 1929	July 9, 1929	Estonian Labour Party
Oskar Köster	July 9, 1929	February 12, 1931	Settlers' Party
August Kerem	February 12, 1931	November 19, 1932	Estonian People's Party
Aleksander Tõnisson (2nd time)	November 1, 1932	May 18, 1933	Independent
August Kerem (2nd time)	May 18, 1933	October 21, 1933	Estonian People's Party
Paul Lill	October 21, 1933	March 31, 1937	Independent

=== 1937 to 1940 (Minister of War) ===
Name	Took office	Left office
Paul Lill	April 1, 1937	October 12, 1939
Nikolai Reek (2nd time)	October 12, 1939	June 21, 1940

=== 1992 to present (Minister of Defence) ===
Name	Took office	Left office	Party
Ülo Uluots	June 18, 1992	October 21, 1992	Popular Front of Estonia
Hain Rebas	October 21, 1992	August 5, 1993	Estonian National Independence Party
Jüri Luik	August 23, 1993	November 8, 1994	Pro Patria National Coalition Party
Indrek Kannik	January 7, 1994	May 23, 1994	Pro Patria National Coalition Party
Enn Tupp	June 28, 1994	April 17, 1995	Pro Patria National Coalition Party
Andrus Öövel	April 17, 1995	March 25, 1999	Estonian Coalition Party
Jüri Luik (2nd time)	March 25, 1999	January 28, 2002	Pro Patria Union
Sven Mikser	January 28, 2002	April 10, 2003	Estonian Centre Party
Margus Hanson	April 10, 2003	November 22, 2004	Estonian Centre Party
Jaak Jõerüüt	November 22, 2004	October 8, 2005	Estonian Centre Party
Jürgen Ligi	October 10, 2005	April 5, 2007	Estonian Centre Party
Jaak Aaviksoo	April 5, 2007	April 6, 2011	Union of Pro Patria and Res Publica
Mart Laar	April 6, 2011	May 11, 2012	Union of Pro Patria and Res Publica
Urmas Reinsalu	May 14, 2012	March 26, 2014	Union of Pro Patria and Res Publica
Sven Mikser (2nd time)	March 26, 2014	September 14, 2015	Social Democratic Party
Hannes Hanso	September 14, 2015	November 23, 2016	Social Democratic Party
Margus Tsahkna	November 23, 2016	June 12, 2017	Union of Pro Patria and Res Publica
Jüri Luik (3rd time)	June 12, 2017	January 26, 2021	Union of Pro Patria and Res Publica
Kalle Laanet	January 26, 2021	July 18, 2022	Estonian Reform Party
Hanno Pevkur	July 18, 2022	September 16, 2026	Estonian Reform Party
Martin Herem	September 16, 2026	Incumbent	Independent

== Sources ==
- https://kaitseministeerium.ee/et/ministeerium-kontaktid/kaitseminister/eesti-kaitseministrid-labi-ajaloo
