= Minister of Finance (Estonia) =

Government position in Estonia

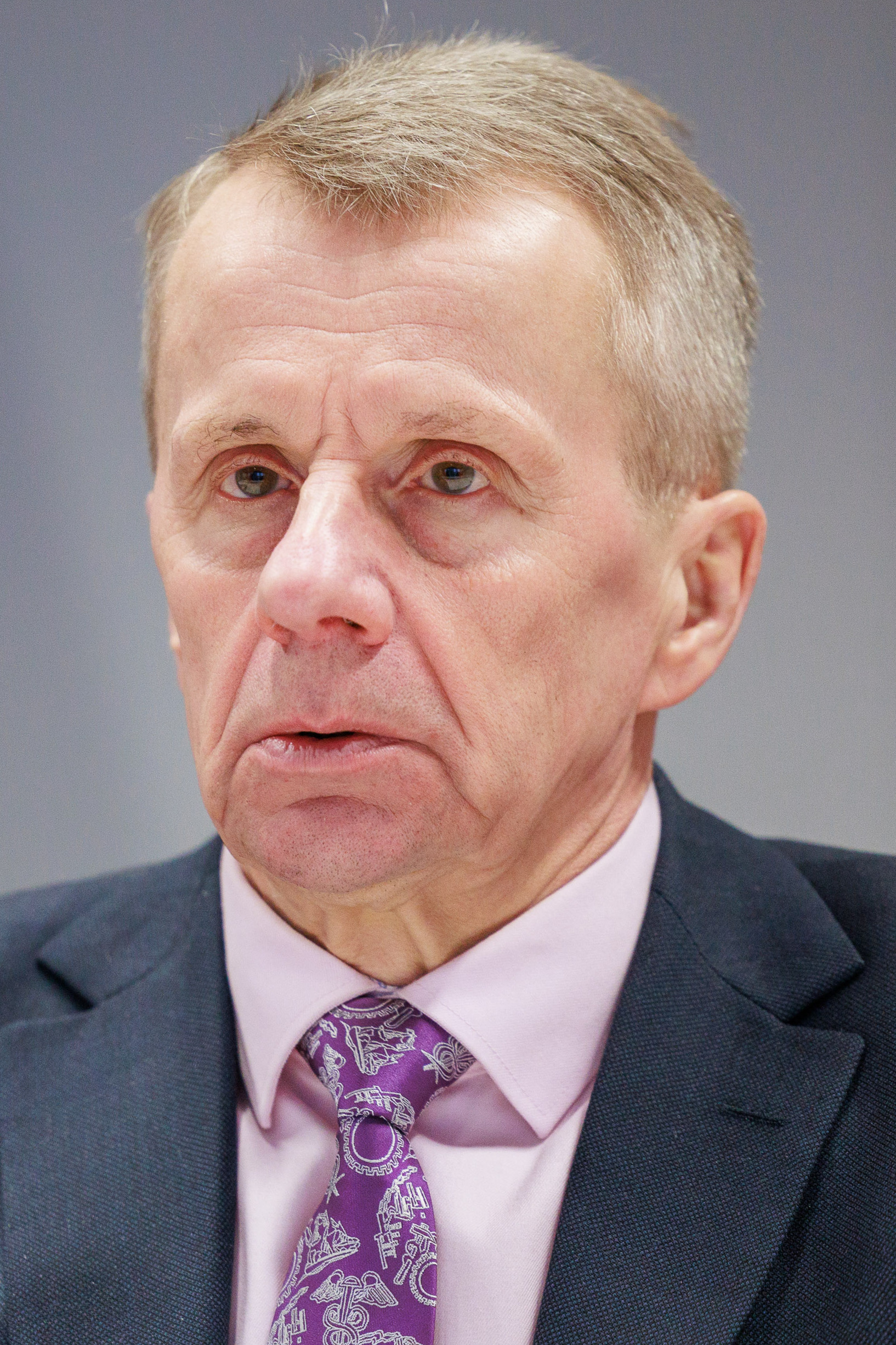
- Incumbent; Jürgen Ligi since 23 July 2024
- Ministry of Finance
- Appointer: Kristen Michal

Minister of Finance (Estonian: Rahandusminister) is the senior minister at the Ministry of Finance (Rahandusministeerium) in the Estonian Government. The Minister is one of the most important members of the Estonian government, with responsibility for coordinating the government's policies on national finances. The position was originally established in 1918.

The Minister of Finance is chosen by the Prime Minister as a part of the government. The current Finance Minister is Jürgen Ligi.

== List of ministers ==
=== Finance and economy (1918–1940) ===
- 1918–1920 Juhan Kukk (Minister of Finance)
- 1920 Tõnis Vares (Minister of Finance)
- 1920–1921 Karl August Baars (Minister of Finance)
- 1921–1924 Georg Vestel (Minister of Finance)
- 1924 Karl August Baars (Minister of Finance)
- 1924 Otto Strandman (Minister of Finance)
- 1924–1927 Leo Sepp (Minister of Finance)
- 1927–1928 Anton Teetsov (Minister of Finance)
- 1928–1929 Aleksander Oinas (Minister of Finance)
- 1929–1931 Johannes-Friedrich Zimmermann (Minister of Economy)
- 1931 Mihkel Pung (Minister of Economy)
- 1931–1932 August Jürman (Minister of Economy)
- 1932 Oskar Suursööt (Minister of Economy)
- 1932 Johannes-Friedrich Zimmermann (Minister of Economy)
- 1932–1933 August Jürman (Minister of Economy)
- 1933 Peeter Kurvits (Minister of Economy)
- 1933–1938 Karl Selter (Minister of Economy)
- 1938–1940 Leo Sepp (Minister of Economy)

=== Finance (1944) ===
- 1944 Hugo Pärtelpoeg (Minister of Finance in Otto Tief's Government from 18 September 1944 to 22 September 1944)

=== Finance (1990–present) ===
- 1990–1992 Rein Miller (Minister of Finance)
- 1992–1994 Madis Üürike (Minister of Finance)
- 1994 Heiki Kranich (Minister of Finance)
- 1994–1995 Andres Lipstok (Minister of Finance)
- 1995–1999 Mart Opmann (Minister of Finance)
- 1999–2002 Siim Kallas (Minister of Finance)
- 2002–2003 Harri Õunapuu (Minister of Finance)
- 2003 Tõnis Palts (Minister of Finance)
- 2003–2005 Taavi Veskimägi (Minister of Finance)
- 2005–2007 Aivar Sõerd (Minister of Finance)
- 2007–2009 Ivari Padar (Minister of Finance)
- 2009–2014 Jürgen Ligi (Minister of Finance)
- 2014–2015 Maris Lauri (Minister of Finance)
- 2015–2017 Sven Sester (Minister of Finance)
- 2017–2019 Toomas Tõniste (Minister of Finance)
- 2019–2021 Martin Helme (Minister of Finance)
- 2021–2022 Keit Pentus-Rosimannus (Minister of Finance)
- 2022–2023 Annely Akkermann (Minister of Finance)
- 2023–2024 Mart Võrklaev (Minister of Finance)
- 2024–present Jürgen Ligi (Minister of Finance)
