= Matti Päts =

Estonian politician (1933–2024)

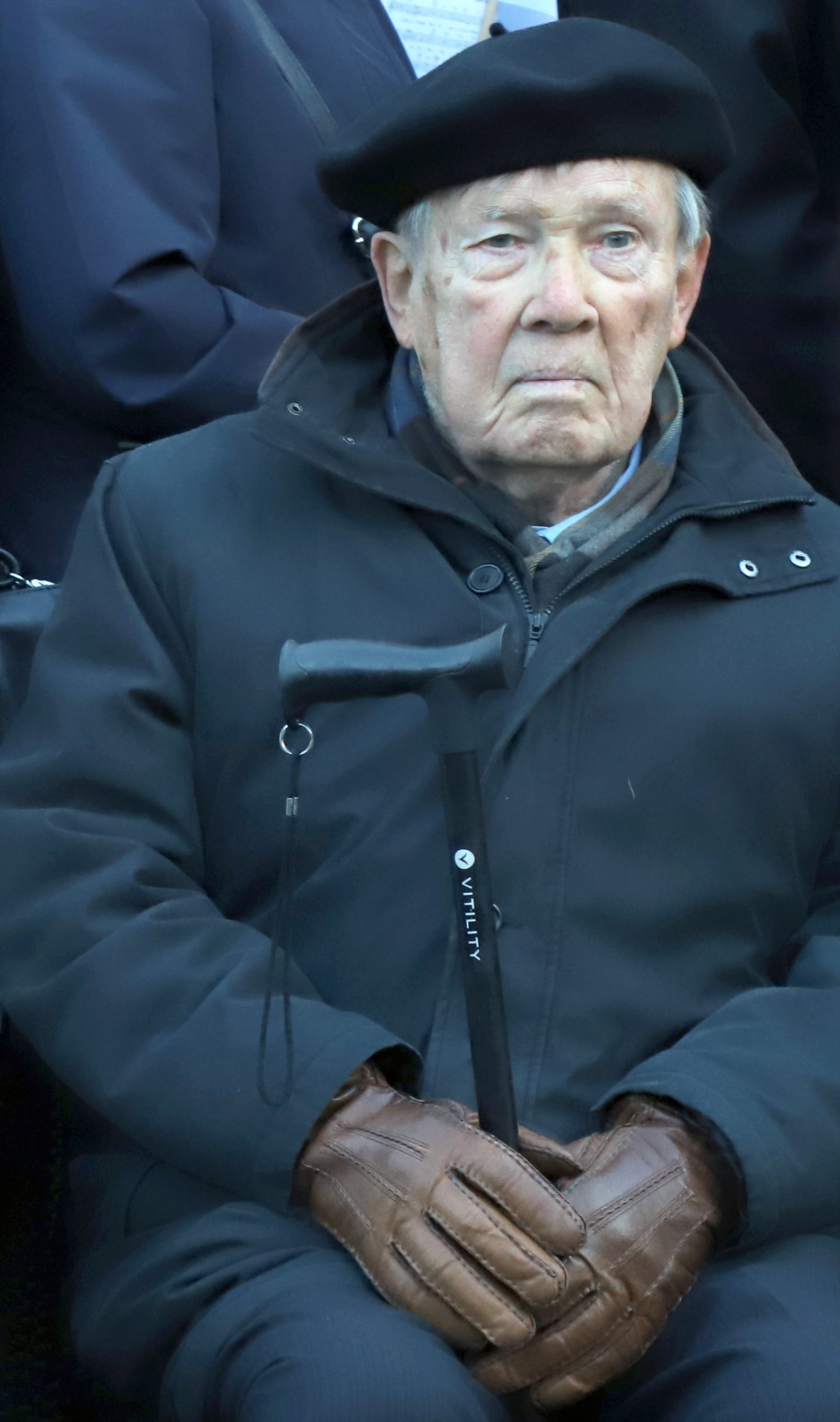
Matti Päts in 2022.

Matti Päts (10 April 1933 – 14 November 2024) was an Estonian politician. He was a member of VII Riigikogu. Born to politician Viktor Päts in Tallinn, he was a grandson of Estonian statesman Konstantin Päts and writer Jaan Lattik. Päts died on 14 November 2024, at the age of 91.
