= Tõnis Vares =

Estonian politician (1859–1925)

Tõnis Vares (23 July 1859 – 27 June 1925 Tallinn) was an Estonian politician.

In 1920 he was Minister of Finance.
