= Konstantin Päts's fifth cabinet =

Government of Estonia from 1933 to 1938

Konstantin Päts's fifth cabinet was in office in Estonia from 21 October, 1933 to 9 May, 1938 headed by Prime Minister of Estonia Konstantin Päts. It was succeeded by Kaarel Eenpalu's second cabinet.

== Members ==
This cabinet's members were the following:

Name	Portrait	Position
Konstantin Päts		Prime Minister
Johan Müller		Minister of the Interior and Minister of Justice
Julius Seljamaa		Minister of Foreign Affairs
Karl Selter		Minister of Economic Affairs
Nikolai Talts		Minister of Agricultural Affairs
Otto Sternbeck		Minister of Roads
Nikolai Kann		Minister of Education
