= Andrus Öövel =

Estonian rower and politician

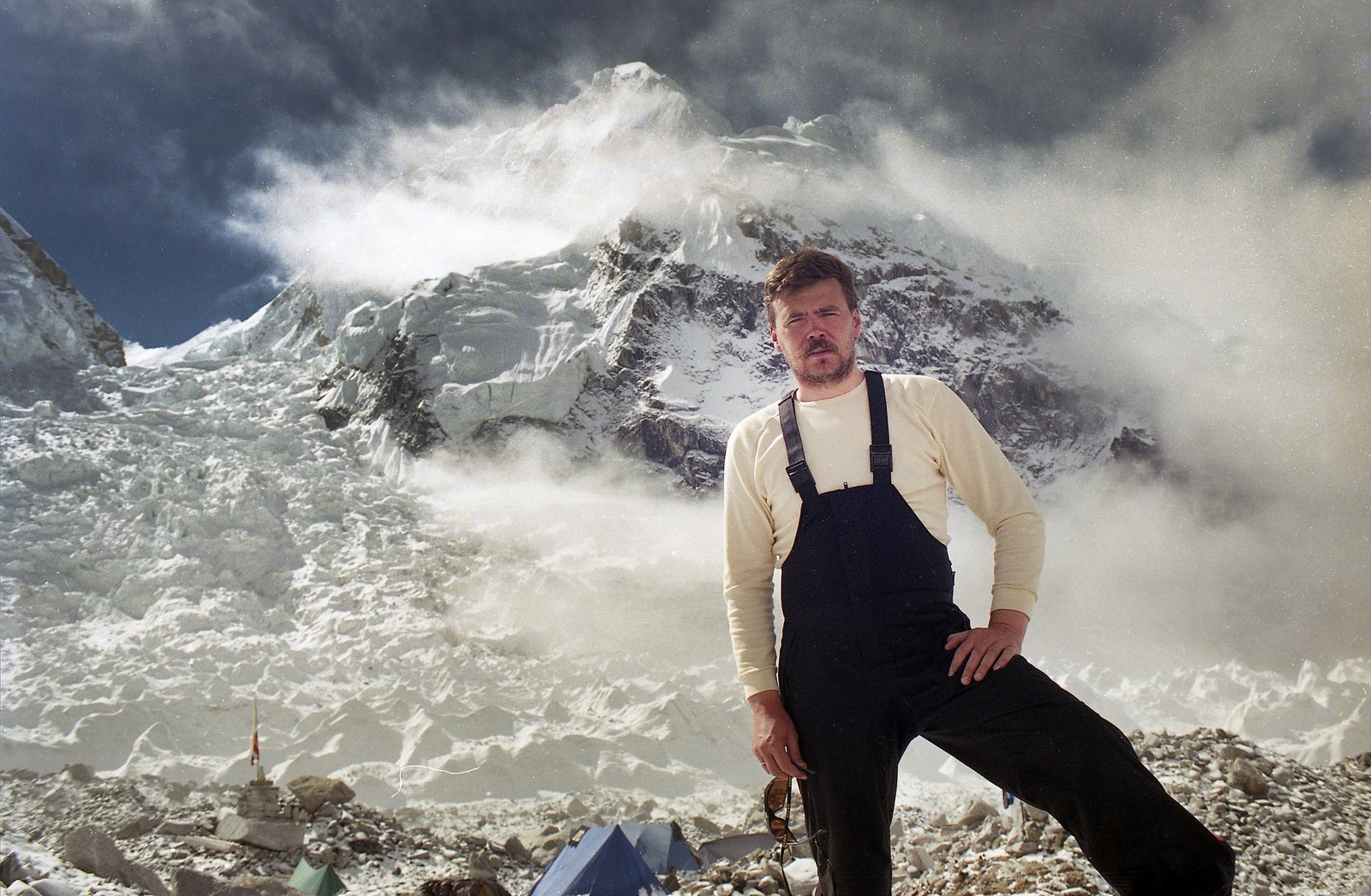
Andrus Öövel in 1998 in Everest base camp

Andrus Öövel (born 17 October 1957 Tallinn) is an Estonian rower and politician. From 1995 until 1999, he was Minister of Defence. He was a member of VIII Riigikogu. He was a 24-time champion of rowing in the Estonian SSR between 1974 and 1984.
