= August Hanko (politician) =

Estonian politician, journalist, and writer

August Johannes Hanko (18 January 1879 Suure-Kambja Parish, Tartu County – 25 May 1952 Kemerovo Oblast) was an Estonian politician, journalist, and writer.

From 1919 to 1920, he was minister of war.
