= Ülo Uluots =

Estonian politician (1930–1997)

Ülo Uluots (4 February 1930 Jõhvi – 18 July 1997 Tallinn) was an Estonian politician, mining engineer and military historian. From April 1992 until October 1992, Uluots was the first Estonian Minister of Defence since Estonia's regaining independence.

His father, Oskar Uluots, was an officer of the Republic of Estonia and brother of Prime Minister of Estonia Jüri Uluots.

He was a member of VIII Riigikogu.
