= Paul Lill =

Estonian military personnel and politician

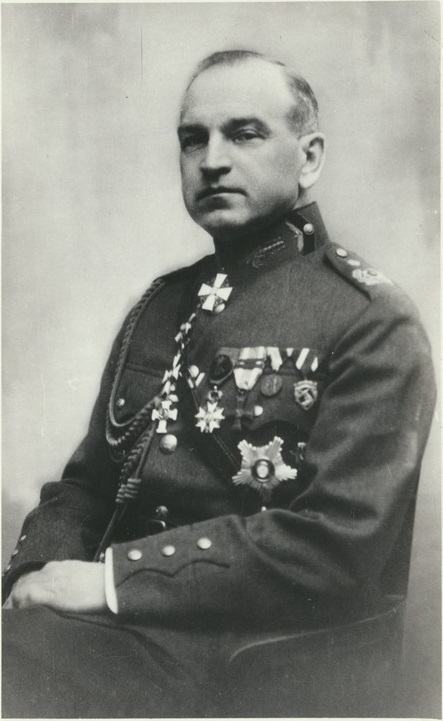
- Lill c. 1930s
- Born: Paul-Adolf Lill; 25 January 1882; Roobe, Governorate of Livonia, Russian Empire
- Died: 13 March 1942 (aged 60); Sverdlovsk Oblast, Russian SFSR, Soviet Union
- Military career
- Allegiance: Russian Empire; Estonia
- Branch: Imperial Russian Army; Estonian Army
- Service years: Russia: 1900–1917; Estonia: 1918–1939
- Rank: Lieutenant general
- Conflicts: Russo-Japanese War; World War I; Estonian War of Independence
- Awards

Paul-Adolf Lill (25 January 1882 – 13 March 1942) was an Estonian military officer and Minister of War. He served in the Imperial Russian Army, participating in the Russo-Japanese War and World War I. Lill joined the Estonian Army during the 1918–1920 Estonian War of Independence, and held important staff positions. After the war he continued military service, holding posts of Chief of Staff of the Estonian Defence Forces, Undersecretary of the Minister of War, and from 1933 to 1939 Minister of War, (Note: The post was named Minister of War until 1929, Minister of Defence from 1929 to 1937, and from 1937 again Minister of War) reaching the rank of lieutenant general. With the onset of Soviet occupation, he was arrested by NKVD in 1941, and died in imprisonment the following year.

== Biography ==
Paul Lill was born on 25 January 1882 to a family of a miller in Veski farm in Roobe Parish (now part of Tõrva Parish), Estonia, then part of the Governorate of Livonia of the Russian Empire. He studied 1891–1892 in Jõgeveste and 1892–1894 in Helme parish schools, and 1894–1899 in Valga town school.

In 1900, Lill voluntarily joined the Imperial Russian Army, and studied from 1901 to 1904 in Vilnius Military School where he met Johan Laidoner, the future Commander‑in‑Chief of the Estonian Armed Forces. In 1905, Lill participated in Russo-Japanese War as a junior officer in the 6th Rifle Regiment. In 1907 he was promoted to the rank of lieutenant. From 1908 to 1911 Lill studied in Imperial Nicholas Military Academy in Saint Petersburg. After graduation he was promoted to staff captain and served in the staff of Odesa Military District. Having reached rank of captain in 1914, Lill participated in the First World War as a commander of 11th company of 95th Infantry Regiment, and was awarded the Order of Saint Anna and Order of Saint Stanislaus. In October 1914 he was captured in East-Prussia by the Imperial German Army, and was held as a prisoner of war until his release in December 1918.

After release, Lill joined the Estonian Army engaged in the Estonian War of Independence, and became Chief of Operations Section of Operations Staff on 18 December 1918. In February 1919 he became temporary, and in May a permanent, Chief of Administrative Agency. In April Lill was promoted to rank of lieutenant-colonel, and in October to rank of colonel, becoming also a member of the War Council and commander of the Reserve Forces. For his service during the War of Independence, Paul Lill was awarded Estonia's Cross of Liberty and Latvia's Order of Lāčplēsis, as well as a farm and 300,000 marks.

After the war Lill continued military service, becoming initially acting, and from October 1920 permanent Chief of Staff of the Defence Forces. In December 1921 he was promoted to rank of major general and became a member of the War Council. In January 1925 Lill became Undersecretary of the Minister of War, position which he held for the next 9 years. In 1933 he became Minister of Defence (from 1937 titled again Minister of War). In January 1938 Lill became member of the National Defense Council, and in February was promoted to rank of lieutenant general, becoming the third Estonian officer to reach the rank. During his service as a Minister of War, Lill also had to repeatedly temporarily fulfill duties of Minister of Interior and Minister of Roads. On 12 October 1939 Paul Lill resigned as Minister of War, citing unacceptable conditions of the Bases Treaty with Soviet Union.

Lill was the chairman of SK Tallinna Sport club, and member of Korporatsioon Sakala, State Decorations Council, War of Independence Memorial Council, Cross of Liberty Brothers Society, and Mulgi Society.

In October 1940 Soviet occupation authorities revoked Lill's retirement pension, and in December evicted him from his apartment at so-called "generals house" at Gonsiori street. Afterwards he completed an accountancy course and tried to find a job. On 14 June 1941 he was arrested by NKVD and deported to Russia together with his sister Olga. Paul Lill died in a prison camp in Sverdlovsk Oblast on 13 May 1942, his place of burial is unknown.

== Honors ==
For his service in the Estonian War of Independence, Lill received Cross of Liberty 1st grade 2nd class and the Latvian Order of Lāčplēsis 2nd class. Service in World War I was rewarded with Russian Order of Saint Anna 3rd class and the Order of Saint Stanislaus 3rd class. In peacetime he received Order of the Cross of the Eagle 1st class and Order of the Estonian Red Cross 2nd class. Lill's foreign awards included Grand Cross of Order of the White Rose of Finland, French Officer of Legion of Honour, Polish Cross of Valour, and Czechoslovak and Hungarian orders. In 1991 a memorial plaque was unveiled on the wall of his birth home.

== Bibliography ==
- Lõhmus, Leho (2015). "I maailmasõja teenetemärgid eesti mehe rinnas". Estonian Yearbook of Military History (in Estonian). 5. Tallinn University Press. ISSN 2228-0669. Archived from the original on 29 June 2022.
- Pihlak, Jaak (2007). "Helme kihelkond ja Vabaduse Risti vennad" (PDF). Viljandi Muuseumi Aastaraamat (in Estonian). 11 (1). Museum of Viljandi. ISSN 1406-7498. Archived (PDF) from the original on 4 March 2016.
- Rosenthal, Reigo (2011). "Johan Laidoneri teenistusest Vene armees aastail 1901–1918". Estonian Yearbook of Military History (in Estonian). 1. Tallinn University Press. ISSN 2228-0669. Archived from the original on 18 March 2022.

Political offices
Preceded by August Kerem	Minister of War; 1933 - 1939	Succeeded by Nikolai Reek
