= Indrek Kannik =

Estonian politician

Minister of Defence
- In office January 1994 – May 1994

Member of VII Riigikogu

Personal details
- Born: 25 November 1965 (age 60) Tallinn, then part of Estonian SSR, Soviet Union

Indrek Kannik (born 25 November 1965 Tallinn) is an Estonian journalist, civil servant, and politician. In 1994, he was the Minister of Defence and a member of VII Riigikogu.
