= Ernst Ein =

Estonian politician

Ernst Heinrich Ein (28 December 1898 – 16 October 1956) was an Estonian jurist, politician and professor of law.

Ein was born in Tartu to Gustav and Helen Ein (née Plumberg). From 1919 until 1920, he served in the Estonian Defense Forces during the Estonian War of Independence. In 1928, he acquired a law degree from the Institute of Law in Rome. Between 1928 and 1944, he was a lecturer of law history at the University of Tartu. In 1932, became an associate professor of private law at the university after receiving his Juris Doctor degree. In 1934, he became a professor of Roman law. Ein taught at the university until 1944. In 1933 he was Minister of Justice and Internal Affairs in the government of Jaan Tõnisson.

Following the Soviet re-occupation of Estonia in 1944, Ein fled the country and later settled in the United States. He died in Claremont, California in 1956, aged 57.
