= Viktor Päts =

Estonian politician

Viktor Päts (18 April 1906 Pärnu – 4 March 1952 Butyrka Prison, Moscow) was an Estonian politician, lawyer, and son of Estonian president Konstantin Päts. He was a member of VI Riigikogu (its Chamber of Deputies).

Viktor Päts studied at the Gustav Adolf Gymnasium in Tallinn, graduating in 1924, then graduating from the Faculty of Law of the University of Tartu and practicing as a lawyer.

In 1931 after the bankruptcy of Dvigatel factory he became the Chairman of the Council of the new AS Eesti Dvigatel enterprise, AS Järvakandi Factories, the Tartu Yeast Factory, the insurance JSC Estonian Lloyd, and in 1939 became a Kirjastus-OÜ Culture Society board member.

Viktor Päts was a member of the First Chamber of the Estonian National Assembly since 1937 and then member of the VI Riigikogu elected from the 36th constituency in 1938.

On 13 April 1937, he was awarded the Latvian Order of the Three Stars 2nd Class.

Viktor Päts was deported on 30 July 1940 after the Soviet occupation of the Baltic states, with his father and family, to Ufa in the Bashkir ASSR. Later he was arrested in 1941, spending several years in prison and dying in 1952 in the Butyrka prison.

== Personal life ==
Viktor Päts was the son of politician Konstantin Päts and Helma Wilhelmine Päts (born Peeti, 1879–1910) and the brother of Leo Päts (1902–1988).

On July 20, 1932, Viktor Päts married Helice Alice Päts (born Lattik, 1911–1988), the daughter of clergyman and writer Jaan Lattik, and they had two sons: Matti Päts (1933–2024) and Henn Päts (1936–1944).
