= Oskar Kask =

Estonian politician (1898–1942)

Oskar Kask (7 January 1898, in Pärnu – 13 April 1942, in Sosva, Russia) was an Estonian politician. He was a member of the III, IV, and V Riigikogu.

Kask was the mayor of Pärnu from 1924 until 1936, and from 1936 until 1940, he was Minister of Social Affairs.

Following the Soviet occupation of Estonia, Kask was arrested by the NKVD and executed by gunshot in the gulag in Sosva, Sverdlovsk Oblast in the Russian Soviet Federative Socialist Republic in 1942.
