= Baltex 2000 =

Company based in Estonia

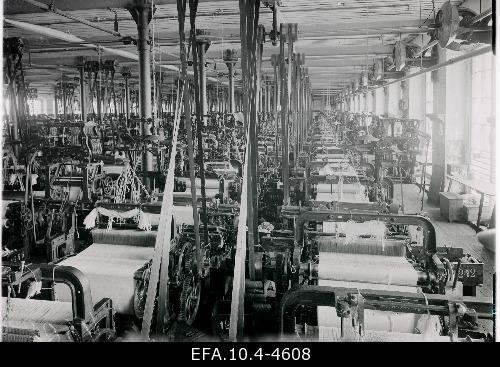
The company's factory in 1940

Baltex 2000 was a textile company in Tallinn, Estonia.

The company was established in 1898. From 1898 to 1941, the company used the name Baltic Cotton Factory (Estonian: Balti Puuvillavabrik). The company's facilities were destroyed in WW II. After the WW II, the facilities were rebuilt.

In 1984, the company had 2140 workers.

The company was shut down in 2006.

In 2020, AS Hepsor and Tolaram Grupp announced that they will jointly invest 100 million euros in the development of the area of the former Balti Manufaktuuri complex, which will result in the creation of a new residential area with commercial premises and 550 apartments. As the first stage of the development of the area, the Manufaktuuri quarter, 269 apartments were completed during the Sitsi Úunaaia development project. The new residential area is the second stage of the development of the Manufaktuuri quarter.
