= Anton Teetsov =

Estonian politician

Anton Teetsov (21 November 1889 – 19 August 1941) was an Estonian politician.

From 1927 to 1928 he was Minister of Finance.
