= Peeter Kurvits =

Estonian politician

Peeter Kurvits (7 November 1891, Polli – 12 February 1962 Tallinn) was an Estonian politician.

In 1933 he was Minister of Economic Affairs.
