= Albert Assor =

Estonian politician

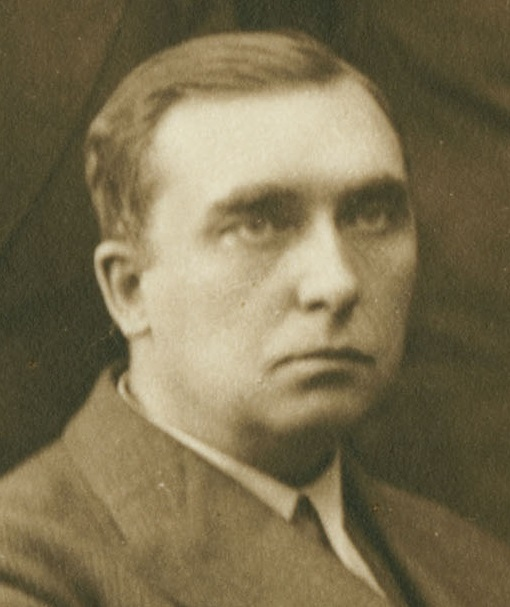
Albert Assor

Albert Assor (8 January 1895 – 16 September 1943 Krasnoyarsk Kray, Russia) was an Estonian politician.

1938–1940 he was Minister of Justice.
