= Leo Sepp =

Estonian politician 1892-1941

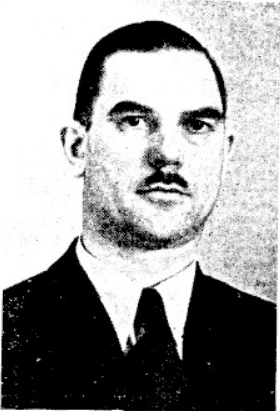
- Portrait of Leo Sepp

Minister of Finance
- In office December 1924 – December 1927
- Appointed by: Jüri Jaakson

Minister of Economy
- In office May 1938 – June 1940

Personal details
- Born: 7 November 1892 Simuna
- Died: 13 December 1941 (aged 49) Usolye
- Awards: Order of the White Star, 1st Class

Leo Sepp (7 November 1892 in Simuna, Estonia – 13 December 1941 in Solikamsk, Russia, USSR) was an Estonian politician, businessman and writer. From 1924 until 1927 he was Minister of Finance and from 1938 to 1940 Minister of Economic Affairs of Estonia.

From 1921 until 1924, he was the director and chairman of the Bank of Estonia. From 1933 until 1938 he was the director of Baltic Cotton Factory. In 1937, using the pen name Rein Sarvesaare, Sepp wrote a theatre play Kaupo; and it was published by the Estonian Academic Artists' Association (EAKK).

Following the Soviet occupation of Estonia in 1940, Sepp was arrested by the NKVD, deported to Soviet Russia, and imprisoned in the Gulag camp system. He died in custody in Solikamsk, Perm Oblast, Russia in 1941.
