= Jaan Lattik =

Estonian politician (1878–1967)

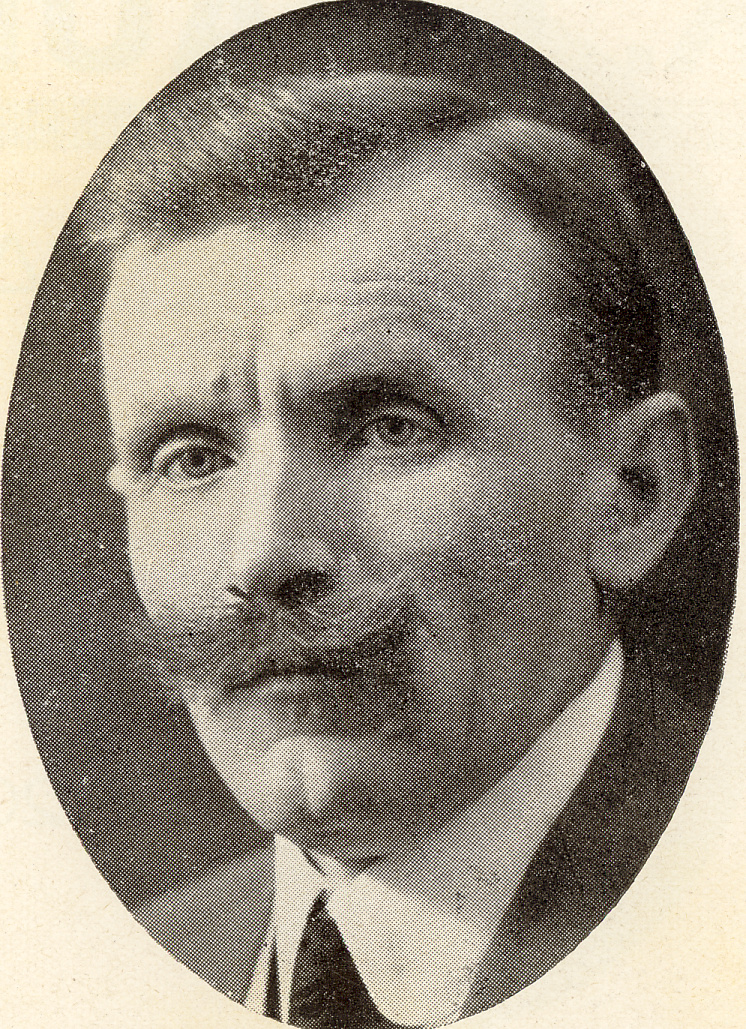
Jaan Lattik

Jaan Lattik (23 October [O.S. 11 October] 1878 near Karula Parish, Estonia – 27 June 1967 in Stockholm, Sweden) was an Estonian politician, writer and a former Estonian Minister of Education and Minister of Foreign Affairs of Estonia.

Lattik was a pastor by profession and studied theology at Tartu University. He was also a writer of children's stories, which were written in a Võro dialect from southern Estonia. Lattik was a member of the Estonian delegation to the League of Nations in 1921. In 1925 he became minister of education and Estonian foreign minister between 1928 and 1931. He was envoy to Lithuania from September, 1939, recalled to Estonia in July 1940. He fled to Sweden in 1944, following the second Soviet occupation of Estonia. He lived in Sweden for the remainder of his life.

In late 2008, Lattik's body was reburied to Viljandi's Old Graveyard in accordance with his relatives' wishes.

In 1932 his daughter Helice Alice (1911–1988) married Viktor, the son of Estonian statesman Konstantin Päts.

Political offices
| Preceded by Hugo Bernhard Rahamägi | Estonian Minister of Education; 1925–1927 | Succeeded by Alfred Julius Mõttus |
| Preceded by Hans Rebane | Minister of Foreign Affairs of Estonia; 1928–1931 | Succeeded by Jaan Tõnisson |
