= Jaan Hünerson =

Estonian politician (1882–1942)

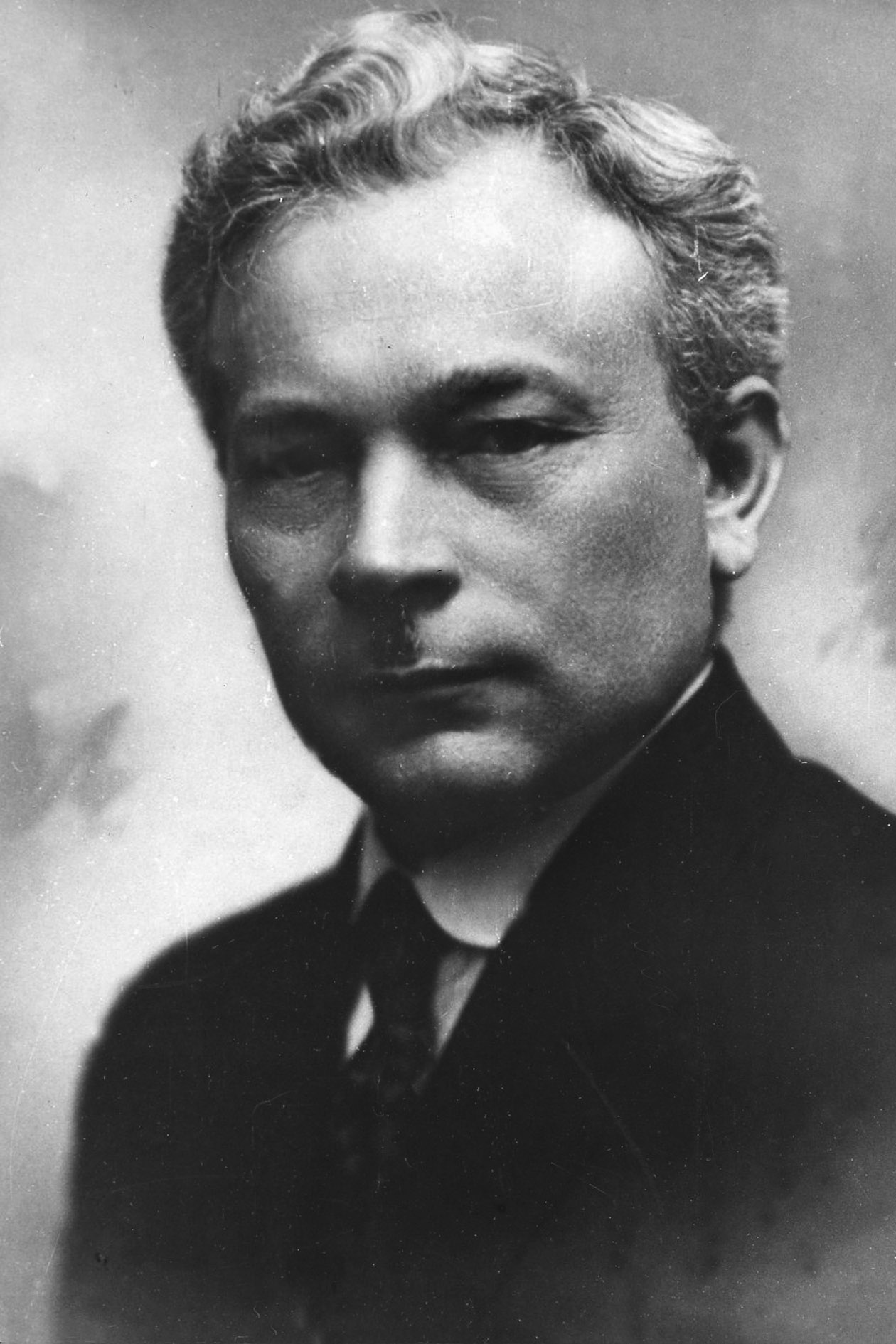
Jaan Hünerson

Jaan Hünerson (4 February 1882 – 5 June 1942 Sosva, Sverdlovsk Oblast, Russian SFSR) was an Estonian agronomist and politician.

Political offices:

- 1927–1928 Minister of Internal Affairs
- 1929–1931 Minister of Education and Social Affairs
- 1931 Minister of Justice and Internal Affairs
- 1931–1932 Minister of Agriculture
- 1932 Minister of Public Education and Social Affairs
