= Oskar Köster =

Estonian politician (1890–1941)

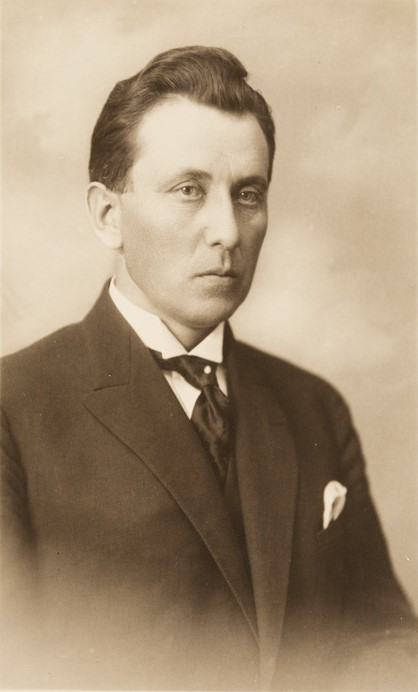
Oskar Köster (1930)

Oskar Köster (20 December 1890 in Pöide – 2 August 1941 Tallinn) was an Estonian politician.

In 1926, he founded the newspaper Maa and was its chief editor. Köster was arrested by the NKVD on 22 July 1940 in Tallinn. He died of a heart attack in Patarei Prison; according to other reports he was executed.

Political offices:

- Mayor of Rägavere Parish
- 1926–1928 and 1932 Minister of Agriculture
- 1928–1929 and 1933 Minister of Communications
- 1929–1931 Minister of Defence
