= Nikino =

Nikino Никино
- Village
- Location within Perm Krai Location within Russia
- Coordinates: 59°43′N 56°18′E
- Country: Russia
- Region: Perm Krai
- District: Solikamsky District
- Time zone: UTC+5:00

Nikino (Russian: Никино) is a rural locality (a village) in Solikamsky District, Perm Krai, Russia. The population was 23 as of 2010. There are 3 streets.

== Geography ==
Nikino is located 50 km northwest of Solikamsk (the district's administrative centre) by road. Kasib is the nearest rural locality.
