= Krasny Bereg =

Krasny Bereg Красный Берег
- Settlement
- Flag

- Location within Perm Krai Location within Russia
- Coordinates: 60°00′N 57°41′E
- Country: Russia
- Region: Perm Krai
- District: Solikamsky District
- Time zone: UTC+5:00

Krasny Bereg (Russian: Красный Берег) is a rural locality (a settlement) in Solikamsky District, Perm Krai, Russia. The population was 2,145 as of 2010. There are 17 streets.

== Geography ==
Krasny Bereg is located 76 km northeast of Solikamsk (the district's administrative centre) by road. Konovalova is the nearest rural locality.
