= Urolka =

Urolka Уролка
- Selo
- Location within Perm Krai Location within Russia
- Coordinates: 59°47′N 55°47′E
- Country: Russia
- Region: Perm Krai
- District: Solikamsky District
- Time zone: UTC+5:00

Urolka (Russian: Уролка) is a rural locality (a selo) in Solikamsky District, Perm Krai, Russia. The population was 120 as of 2010. There are 5 streets.

== Geography ==
Urolka is located 81 km northwest of Solikamsk (the district's administrative centre) by road. Basim is the nearest rural locality.
