= Lyzib =

Lyzib Лызиб
- Village
- Location within Perm Krai Location within Russia
- Coordinates: 59°40′N 56°19′E
- Country: Russia
- Region: Perm Krai
- District: Solikamsky District
- Time zone: UTC+5:00

Lyzib (Russian: Лызиб) is a rural locality (a village) in Solikamsky District, Perm Krai, Russia. The population was 82 as of 2010. There are 5 streets.

== Geography ==
Lyzib is located 56 km northwest of Solikamsk (the district's administrative centre) by road. Kasib is the nearest rural locality.
