= Geologorazvedka =

Geologorazvedka Геологоразведка
- Settlement
- Location within Perm Krai Location within Russia
- Coordinates: 59°32′N 56°43′E
- Country: Russia
- Region: Perm Krai
- District: Solikamsky District
- Time zone: UTC+5:00

Geologorazvedka (Russian: Геологоразведка) is a rural locality (a settlement) in Solikamsky District, Perm Krai, Russia. The population was 212 as of 2010. There are 4 streets.

== Geography ==
Geologorazvedka is located 15 km south of Solikamsk (the district's administrative centre) by road. Chashkina is the nearest rural locality.
