= Nizhneye Moshevo =

Nizhneye Moshevo Нижнее Мошево
- Settlement
- Location within Perm Krai Location within Russia
- Coordinates: 59°48′N 56°36′E
- Country: Russia
- Region: Perm Krai
- District: Solikamsky District
- Time zone: UTC+5:00

Nizhneye Moshevo (Russian: Нижнее Мошево) is a rural locality (a settlement) in Solikamsky District, Perm Krai, Russia. The population was 838 as of 2010. There are 5 streets.

== Geography ==
Nizhneye Moshevo is located 22 km northwest of Solikamsk (the district's administrative centre) by road. Yeskina is the nearest rural locality.
