= Usovsky =

Usovsky Усовский
- Settlement
- Location within Perm Krai Location within Russia
- Coordinates: 59°31′N 56°50′E
- Country: Russia
- Region: Perm Krai
- District: Solikamsky District
- Time zone: UTC+5:00

Usovsky (Russian: Усовский) is a rural locality (a settlement) in Solikamsky District, Perm Krai, Russia. The population was 413 as of 2010. There are 16 streets.

== Geography ==
Usovsky is located 16 km southeast of Solikamsk (the district's administrative centre) by road. Volodino is the nearest rural locality.
