= Chashkina =

Chashkina Чашкина
- Village
- Location within Perm Krai Location within Russia
- Coordinates: 59°32′N 56°43′E
- Country: Russia
- Region: Perm Krai
- District: Solikamsky District
- Time zone: UTC+5:00

Chashkina (Russian: Чашкина) is a rural locality (a village) in Solikamsky District, Perm Krai, Russia. The population was 23 as of 2010. There are 5 streets.

== Geography ==
Chashkina is located 17 km north of Solikamsk (the district's administrative centre) by road.
