= Maloye Gorodishche =

Maloye Gorodishche Малое Городище
- Village
- Location within Perm Krai Location within Russia
- Coordinates: 59°40′N 56°49′E
- Country: Russia
- Region: Perm Krai
- District: Solikamsky District
- Time zone: UTC+5:00

Maloye Gorodishche (Russian: Малое Городище) is a rural locality (a village) in Solikamsky District, Perm Krai, Russia. The population was 30 as of 2010. There is 1 street.

== Geography ==
Maloye Gorodishche is located 6 km northeast of Solikamsk (the district's administrative centre) by road. Gorodishche is the nearest rural locality.
