= Osokino =

Osokino Осокино
- Selo
- Location within Perm Krai Location within Russia
- Coordinates: 59°41′N 56°20′E
- Country: Russia
- Region: Perm Krai
- District: Solikamsky District
- Time zone: UTC+5:00

Osokino (Russian: Осокино) is a rural locality (a selo) in Solikamsky District, Perm Krai, Russia. The population was 127 as of 2010. There are 6 streets.

== Geography ==
Osokino is located 29 km northeast of Solikamsk (the district's administrative centre) by road.
