= Tyulkino =

Tyulkino Тюлькино
- Settlement
- Location within Perm Krai Location within Russia
- Coordinates: 59°50′N 56°31′E
- Country: Russia
- Region: Perm Krai
- District: Solikamsky District
- Time zone: UTC+5:00

Tyulkino (Russian: Тюлькино) is a rural locality (a settlement) in Solikamsky District, Perm Krai, Russia. The population was 1,331 as of 2010. There are 31 streets.

== Geography ==
Tyulkino is located 29 km northwest of Solikamsk (the district's administrative centre) by road. Verkhneye Moshevo is the nearest rural locality.
