= Verkhneye Moshevo =

Verkhneye Moshevo Верхнее Мошево
- Selo
- Location within Perm Krai Location within Russia
- Coordinates: 59°50′N 56°34′E
- Country: Russia
- Region: Perm Krai
- District: Solikamsky District
- Time zone: UTC+5:00

Verkhneye Moshevo (Russian: Верхнее Мошево) is a rural locality (a selo) in Solikamsky District, Perm Krai, Russia. The population was 168 as of 2010. There are 5 streets.

== Geography ==
Verkhneye Moshevo is located 26 km northwest of Solikamsk (the district's administrative centre) by road. Zaton is the nearest rural locality.
