= Kuksha of Odessa =

Eastern Orthodox hieromonk and saint (1875–1964)

Saint Kuksha of Odessa

Priest, Hieromonk, Schema-monk
- Born: Kuzma Kirillovich Velichko; 25 January 1875 (O.S. 12 January 1875); Arbuzynka, Kherson Governorate, Russian Empire
- Died: 24 December 1964; Odessa, USSR
- Cause of death: Pneumonia (after breaking hip)
- Venerated in: Ukrainian Orthodox Church (Moscow Patriarchate)
- Canonized: 1995 by Holy Synod of the Ukrainian Orthodox Church
- Major shrine: Holy Dormition Monastery, Odessa

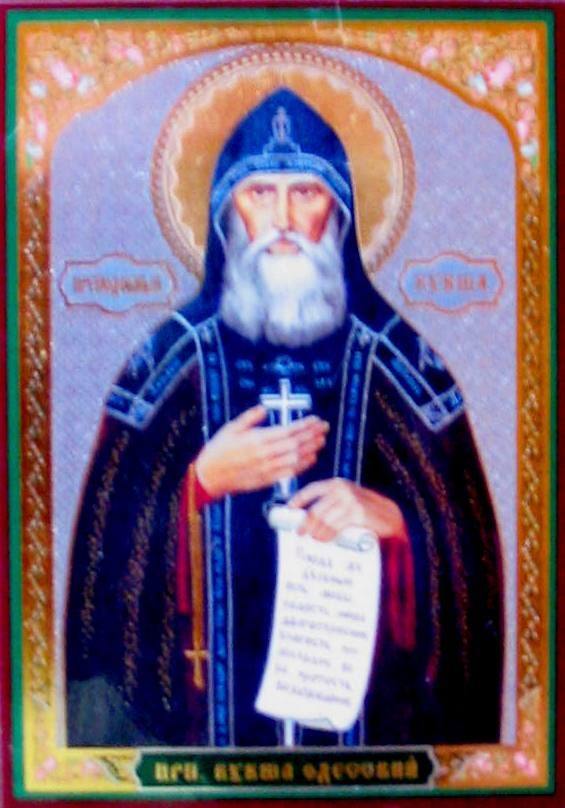
Icon of Kuksha of Odessa

Kuksha of Odessa, born Kuzma Kirillovich Velichko (25 January [O.S. 13 January] 1875 in Arbuzynka, Kherson Governorate, Russian Empire – 24 December 1964 in Odessa, USSR), was an imperial Russian priest and a Ukrainian Orthodox Church (Moscow Patriarchate) saint who was canonized in 1995.

== Early life ==
Kosma Velitchko was born on 12 January 1875 in the village of Arbuzynka in the Nikolaev Province of the Kherson Governorate to Kirill and Kharitina Velitchko. Although his mother dreamed of becoming a nun in her youth, she married to obey her parents. She had two more sons - Theodore (Fedor) and John (Ivan) - and a daughter, Maria, hoping that one of her children would enter the monastic life.

During his youth, Velitchko walked to the Kiev Pechersk Lavra, the Troitse-Sergiyeva Lavra, the far-northern Valaam and Solovki monasteries, and Jerusalem and the Holy Land in 1895. He lived in Jerusalem for six months, and visited all of Palestine's sacred places. On his way back, Velitchko visited Mount Athos. Before leaving the mountain, the pilgrims went to the archimandrite of Saint Panteleimon monastery for a blessing and Velitchko expressed his desire to join the monks there. The archimandrite told him to return after a year, and gave him a small icon of Saint Panteleimon (the monastery's patron saint). Velitchko kept it for his entire life.

== Joining Saint Panteleimon monastery (1896) ==
Velitchko arrived at Athos (with his parents’ blessing) in 1896, became a novice at Saint Panteleimon Monastery and was placed in charge of altar offerings (prosphoras). He visited Jerusalem again with his mother in 1897. Two events occurred in Jerusalem. Pilgrims unable to have children tried to bathe first at the Siloam baths, so God would grant them children. Velitchko fell into the water, to the amusement of the people who began saying that he would have many children. The second event occurred when he visited the Church of the Holy Sepulchre, where pilgrims wanted to anoint themselves with oil from the lamps. While Velitchko was worshiping, the central oil lamp spilled its oil all over him. People quickly surrounded him, trying to anoint themselves with oil from his clothing. After returning to Athos, Velitchko was a servant at the pilgrims' guesthouse for 11 years.

== Monastic vows as Xenophont (1904) ==
Soon after Velitchko was tonsured with the name Constantine on 5 April [O.S. 23 March] 1904, he received the monastic name Xenophont. The Imiaslavie movement reached the Athos monastery in 1912–1913, and Greek authorities demanded that many foreign monks leave (including Xenophont, who was uninvolved).

== Kiev Pechersk Lavra monastery (1913-1935) ==
In 1913, Xenophont entered the Kiev Pechersk Lavra monastery. The following year, after the outbreak of World War I, he and other monks worked on the Kiev-Lvov railway for 10 months before returning to the monastery. Although Xenophont wished to reach the Great Schema, his young age (40) was an obstacle.

=== Great Schema tonsure as Kuksha (1931) ===
Xenophont suddenly became gravely ill at age 56, and it was thought that he would not survive. Believed that he was dying, he was tonsured into schema on 8 April 1931 and given the name Kuksha (after a saint whose relics are in nearby caves). Kuksha recovered, and was consecrated a priest-deacon (hierodeacon) on 3 April 1934 and priest-monk (hieromonk) on 3 May of that year.

== First arrest by Soviet authorities (1938) ==
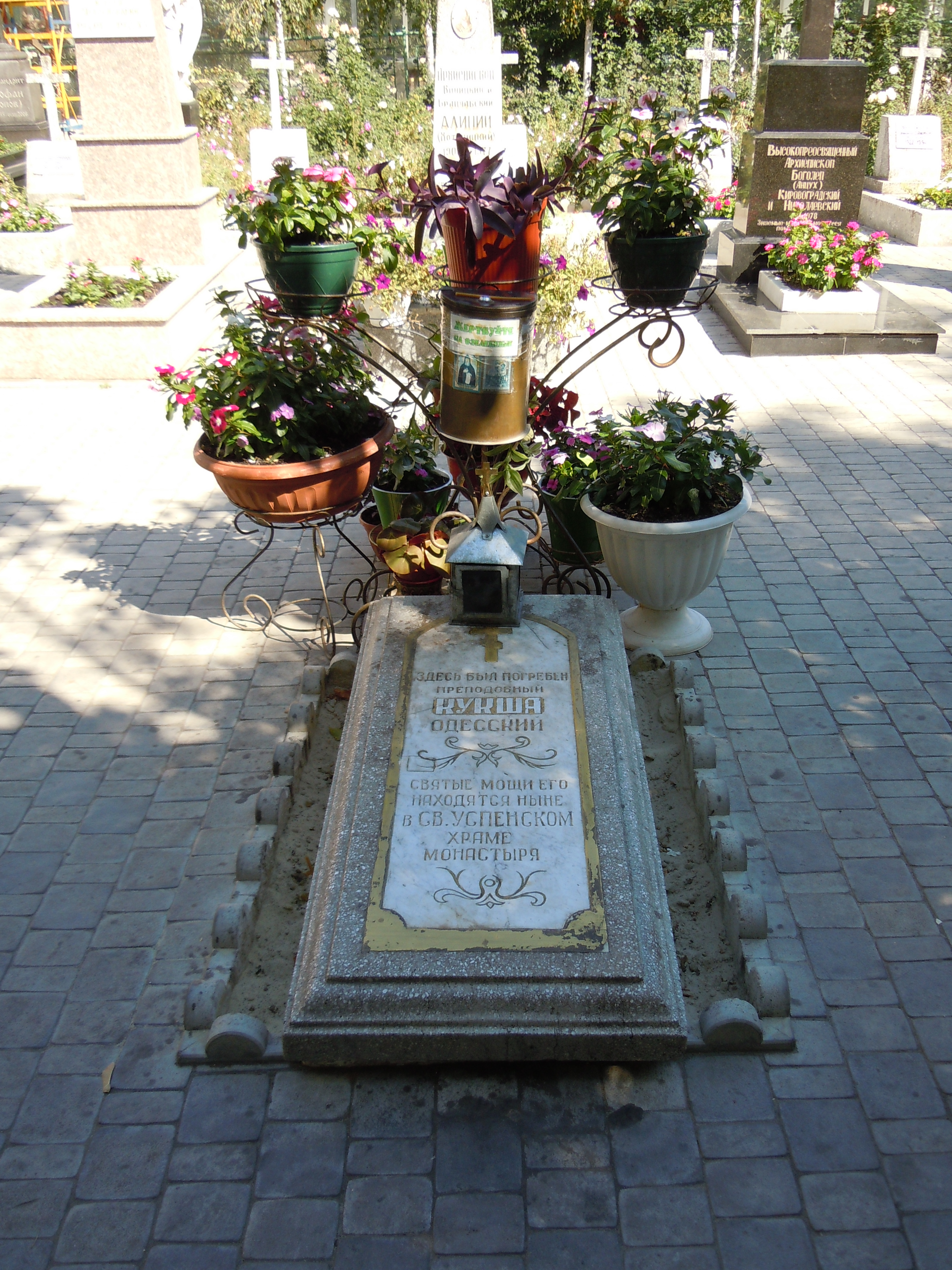
Kuksha's original grave

After the Kiev Pechersk Lavra was closed with a decision by Soviet Ukraine officials, Kuksha served at the church at Voskresenksaya Slobodka. In 1938, he was accused by Soviet authorities of being a "cult servant" and sentenced to five years in Vilva subcamp of Usollag labor camp of Gulag in Molotov Oblast (present-day Perm Krai), Ural. At age 63, Kuksha and other priests and monks were working 14 hours a day at hard labour in cold weather and were poorly fed. Pieces of the consecrated Eucharist were sent to the camp with other breads, so hundreds of convicted priests and monks could receive communion. After his release from the camp (on Saint George's Day in the spring of 1943), Kuksha was sentenced to three years of exile in the village of Kungur in Solikamsky District. He was blessed by the bishop of Solikamsk, and often conducted church services in the village.

== Return to Ukraine (1947) ==
In 1947, Kuksha returned to the Kiev Pechersk Lavra monastery. Four years later, Soviet authorities transferred him from Kiev to the Pochayiv Lavra monastery in western Ukraine. For three years, Kuksha conducted morning services in the monastery's cave churches.

In late April 1957, during the Great Lent's Holy Week, he was transferred to the Monastery of Saint John the Theologian in Khreshchatyk, Chernivtsi Oblast. Three years later, the Chernivtsi convent was closed; the nuns were transferred to the monastery, and the monks were sent to the Pochayiv Lavra. Kuksha was transferred to the Holy Dormition Monastery in Odessa on 19 July 1960, where he spent the last four years of his life.

== Death and canonization ==
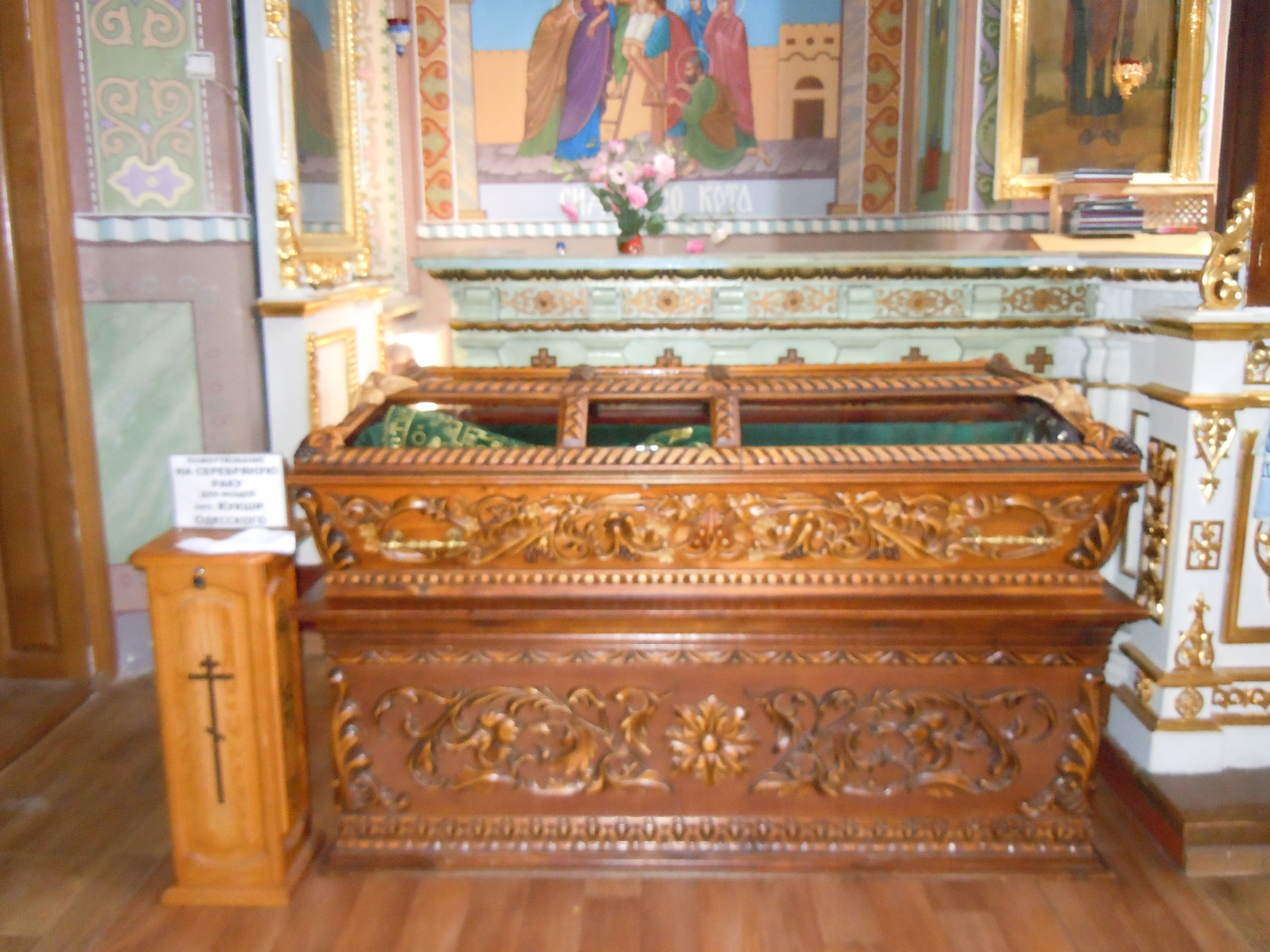
Kuksha's sarcophagus in Odessa's Holy Dormition Monastery

In October 1964, Kuksha fell and broke his hip. Lying on the cold ground, he caught a cold and developed pneumonia. Refusing to take medicine, Kuksha died on 24 December 1964 and was buried in the cemetery of the Holy Dormition Monastery in Odessa. After the collapse of the Soviet Union, he was glorified as venerable by the Holy Synod of the Ukrainian Orthodox Church in 1995; he is commemorated on September 16 (September 29).
