= Tokhtuyeva =

Tokhtuyeva Тохтуева
- Selo
- Location within Perm Krai Location within Russia
- Coordinates: 59°43′N 56°43′E
- Country: Russia
- Region: Perm Krai
- District: Solikamsky District
- Time zone: UTC+5:00

Tokhtuyeva (Russian: Тохтуева) is a rural locality (a selo) and the administrative center of Tokhtuyevskoye Rural Settlement, Solikamsky District, Perm Krai, Russia. The population was 1,583 as of 2010. There are 62 streets.

== Geography ==
Tokhtuyeva is located 9 km north of Solikamsk (the district's administrative centre) by road. Syola is the nearest rural locality.
