= Basim (settlement) =

Basim Басим
- Settlement
- Location within Perm Krai Location within Russia
- Coordinates: 59°45′N 55°41′E
- Country: Russia
- Region: Perm Krai
- District: Solikamsky District
- Time zone: UTC+5:00

Basim (Russian: Басим) is a rural locality (a settlement) and the administrative center of Basimskoye Rural Settlement, Solikamsky District, Perm Krai, Russia. The population was 461 as of 2010. There are 8 streets.

== Geography ==
Basim is located 92 km west of Solikamsk (the district's administrative centre) by road. Urolka is the nearest rural locality.
