= Polovodovo =

Polovodovo Половодово
- Selo
- Location within Perm Krai Location within Russia
- Coordinates: 59°39′N 57°04′E
- Country: Russia
- Region: Perm Krai
- District: Solikamsky District
- Time zone: UTC+5:00

Polovodovo (Russian: Половодово) is a rural locality (a selo) and the administrative center of Polovodovskoye Rural Settlement, Solikamsky District, Perm Krai, Russia. The population was 1,526 as of 2010. There are 42 streets.

== Geography ==
Polovodovo is located 19 km east of Solikamsk (the district's administrative centre) by road. Trenina is the nearest rural locality.
