= Saint Kuksha =

Saint Kuksha may refer to:

- Saint Kuksha of the Kiev Caves (died after 1114), monk and martyr from the Kyiv Pechersk Lavra (Kyiv Monastery of the Caves)
- Kuksha of Odessa (1875 - 1964), modern saint canonized by Ukrainian Orthodox Church
