= Constantine Coronini =

Russian Orthodox priest

Constantine Koronin (September 19, 1881 - December 11, 1924, Harbin, China ) was a Russian Orthodox (later Greek Catholic) priest.

== Biography ==
Born in Gorodishche, Solikamsky District, in the Perm Orthodox diocese, John Coronini's son, he also a converted to Catholicism from Orthodoxy. Koronin studied at the Perm and the Tiflis Theological Seminary, in 1909 graduated from the Saint Petersburg Theological Academy with a degree in theology. He studied at the Imperial Archaeological Institute. Constantine Koronin served as rector of the church in the Petrakovskaya county (Diocese of Warsaw), being from 1913 rector at Warsaw prison. Since the beginning of the First World War he was evacuated. In 1915 became rector of the Cathedral of Chita, a member of the Diocesan Council of the Trans-Baikal and diocesan missionary preacher. In 1921 twice been attempted by the Bolsheviks, in the same year immigrated to China, becoming the abbot of Holy Church in Iver Harbin and Professor of Russian-Chinese Polytechnic Institute and chairman of the commission that drafted the Far East Council of Churches.

== Conversion to Catholicism and death ==
In 1923 Koronin joined to Catholic Church came from Russian Orthodoxy and died in 1924 of stomach cancer.

== Sources ==
- Vladimir Kolupaev. Catholic communities of the Byzantine Rite and the Russian diaspora.
- Zhilevich (Miroshnichenko) T. In memory of the dead in the land of Manchuria and harbintsah. - Melbourne, 2000. S. 83.
- Tretjakewitsch L. Bishop Michel d `Herbigny sj and Russia. Augustinus-Verlag Wurzburg, 1990. - P. 168–254.
- Biography of Fr. KI Cronin. - Library of the Pontifical Oriental Institute in Rome.
- Vlasov piano Waldenberg B. A brief sketch of the Catholic movement in the Far East (1925-1935 gg.) - / / The Catholic Herald. - Harbin, 1935, No. 1.
- Jazep Hermanovich, Fr. China, Siberia, Moscow. (Translated from Belarus). - Melbourne, 1997. - P.12-13.
- Diodor Kolpinskiy, Fr. Catholicism in the Russian Far East. - / / Kitezh. - Warsaw, 1931, No. 1.
- Vladimir Kolupaev, Fr. John and Fr Constantine Koronin- Russian Byzantine Rite Catholic priests. - / / Siberian Catholic newspaper. - Novosibirsk, 2004, No. 10. - P. 10–11.; Continued number 11, p. 15-17, 22.
- Konstantin Nikolaev Eastern Rite. - Paris: YMCA, 1950.
