= Ural mining civilization =

Ural mining civilization (or Ural'skaya Gornozavodskaya tsivilizatsiya; Russian: Уральская горнозаводская цивилизация) refers to a historical period in the Ural region of Russia spanning from the early 18th to the mid-19th century.

== History ==
Ethnographer Pavel Bogoslovsky coined the term "Ural mining civilization" in 1926 to describe a specific period of rapid and unprecedented growth in immigration, agricultural development and mining (both salt and metallurgic) in the Ural, following cultural and historical study of the region. Of the approximately 500 industrial cities established in Russia from the early 18th to the mid-19th century, over half were established in this region. These cities made the Ural not only the area of largest industrial construction, but also the world's largest metallurgy center. The rapid economic growth in the region contributed to the development of Siberia and Far-Eastern Russia.

The period is defined by a "distinctive" culture. Cities in the region had a specific purpose and style of design. By the beginning of the 19th century, these industrial cities had grown large enough to have architectural ensembles - both a governorate (regional) architect, and architects of mining factories and areas.

== See also ==
- History of Metallurgy in the Urals

== Bibliography ==
- History and ecology: essays on the origins of historical hydrogeography. Monograph / Lev Ban'kowski. - Solikamsk: RIO GOU VPO "SGPI", 2008. - 356 p. - ISBN 978-5-89469-055-1.
