= Usolka =

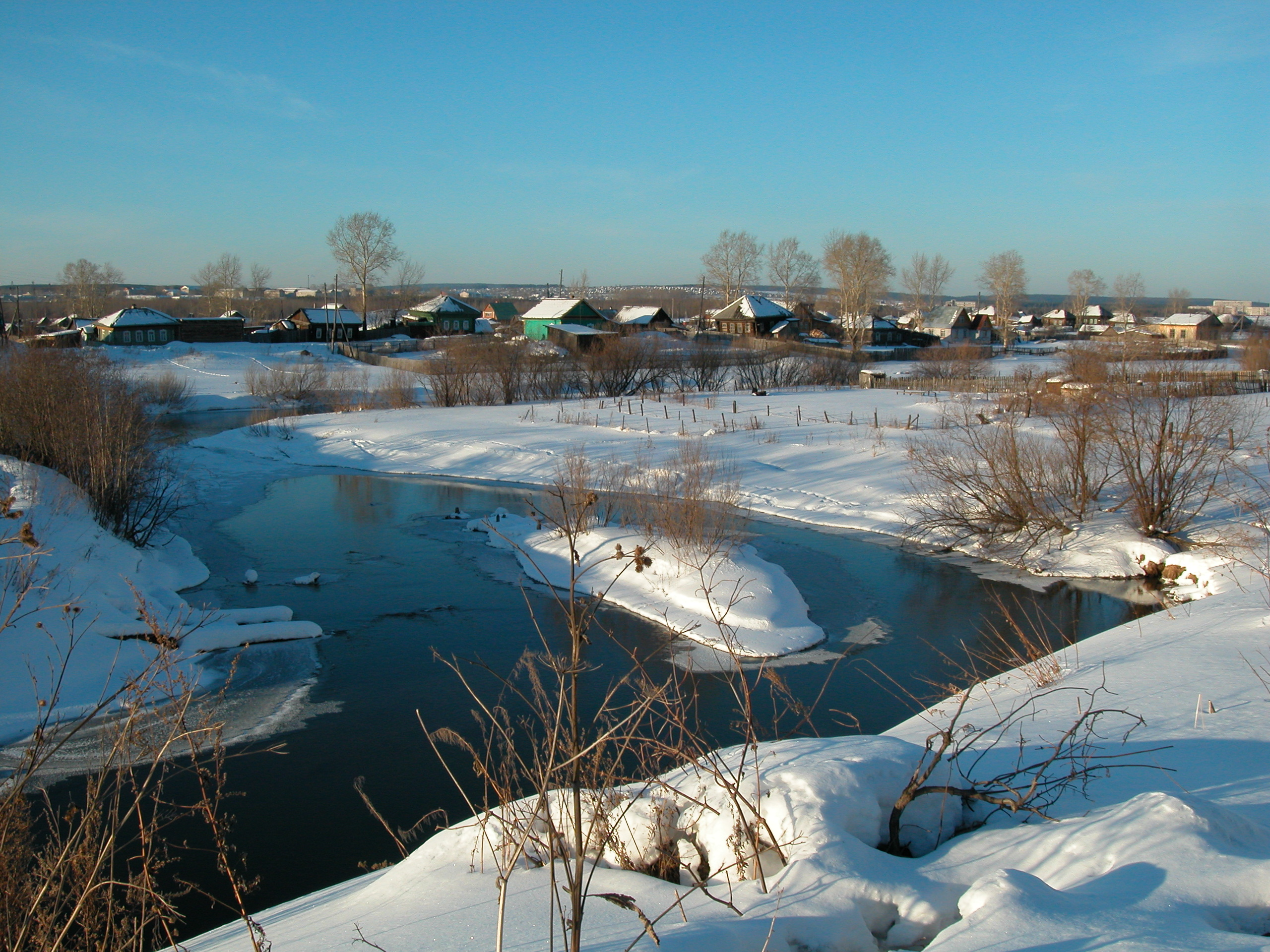
- The Usolka in Solikamsk

Location
- Country: Russia

Physical characteristics
- Mouth
  - location: Kama
  - coordinates: 59°37′24″N 56°41′33″E
- Length: 57 km (35 mi)
- Basin size: 506 km^{2} (195 sq mi)

Basin features
- Progression: Kama→ Volga→ Caspian Sea

The Usolka (Russian: Усолка) is a river in Perm Krai, Russia; the west tributary of the river Kama. It is 57 kilometres (35 mi) long, and its drainage basin covers 506 square kilometres (195 mi^{2}).
