= Ust-Borovaya Saltworks =

Saltworks and museum in Solikamsk, Russia

Coordinates: 59.7107°N 56.6668°E

Salt Museum Музей соли
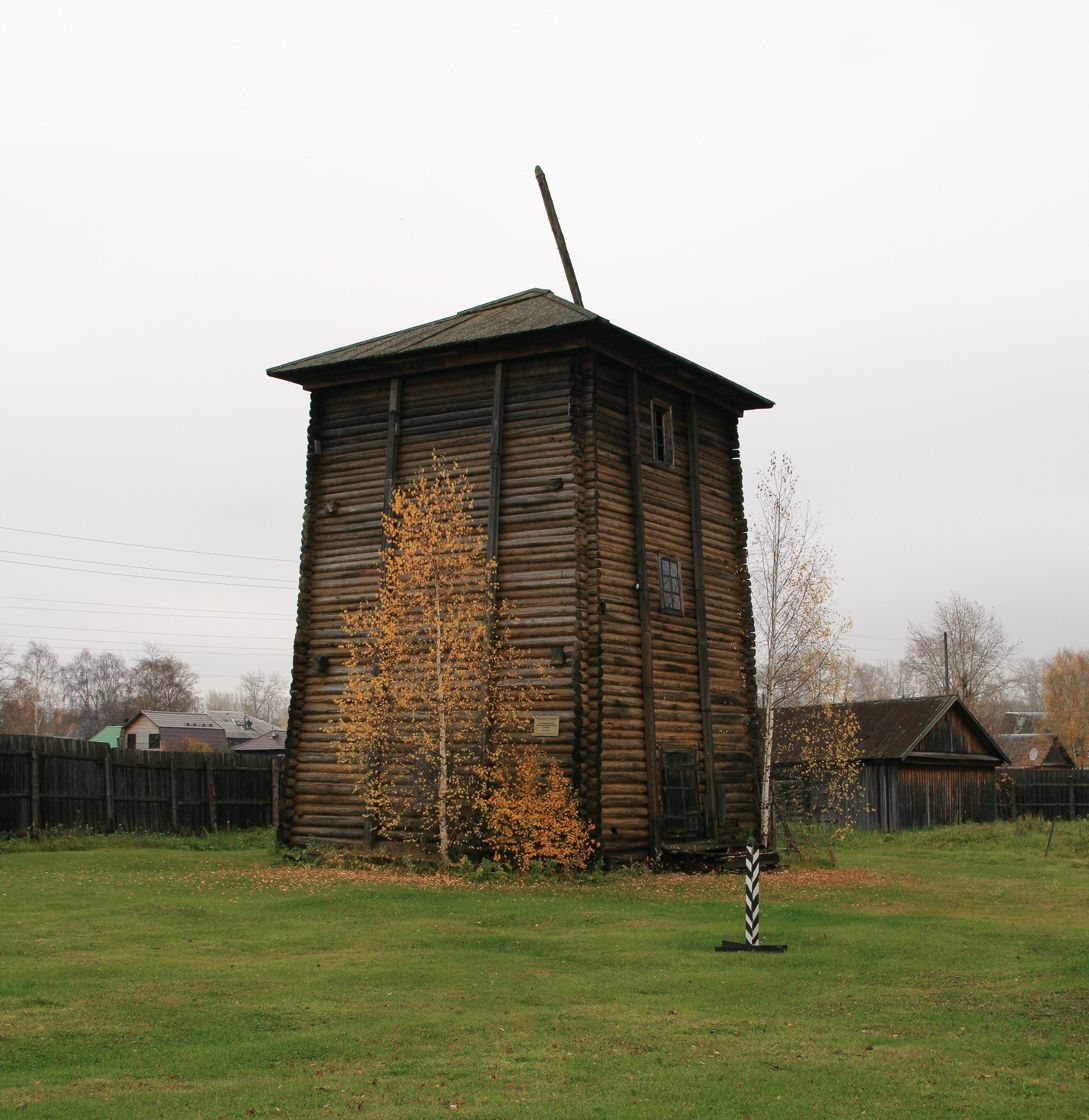
- The Resurrection (Voznesenskaya) salt tower
- Established: 1982
- Location: Solikamsk, Russia
- Type: Historical
- Website: http://muzeisolik.ru

Ust-Borovaya Saltworks (Russian: Усть-Боровской солеваренный завод) is a former saltworks in the city of Solikamsk, Perm Krai, Russia. It is unique since all of its buildings, with the exception of the ground floor of the administration office, are made of wood. The saltworks hosts the Salt Museum. The ensemble of the saltworks is designated as cultural heritage monument protected at the federal level.

== History ==
Solikamsk was traditionally a center of salt extraction, which was mainly concentrated in the city center and was initially controlled by the Stroganov family. By the second half of the 19th century, the salt wells in the city center were exhausted, and local merchant Alexander Ryazantsev started exploration in Ust-Borovaya, on the left bank of the Kama River north of Solikamsk. In 1882, he built the saltworks, which also served as a research laboratory. The saltworks used the traditional evaporation technology, and by the middle of the 20th century it remained the only saltworks in Russia using this technology. On 1 January 1972, it was closed down and eventually transformed into a museum.

== Technology ==
The wells in Ust-Borovaya are more than 100 metres (330 ft) deep. Above each well there was a wooden salt tower. Originally the solution was lifted from the well by buckets, like in a water well, later pumps were employed. The solution was lifted to the second floor of the tower and then it along a pipe was channeled to a different wooden building, a lar - a solution depot, which could hold up to approximately 200 cubic metres (7,100 ft^{3}) of solution. From the depot, solution was taken to dedicated buildings where water was evaporated. Subsequently, salt was collected to bags and put into dry salt depots. In the spring, when ice on the Kama melted, salt was transferred to cargo ships which went down the Kama.

== Museum ==
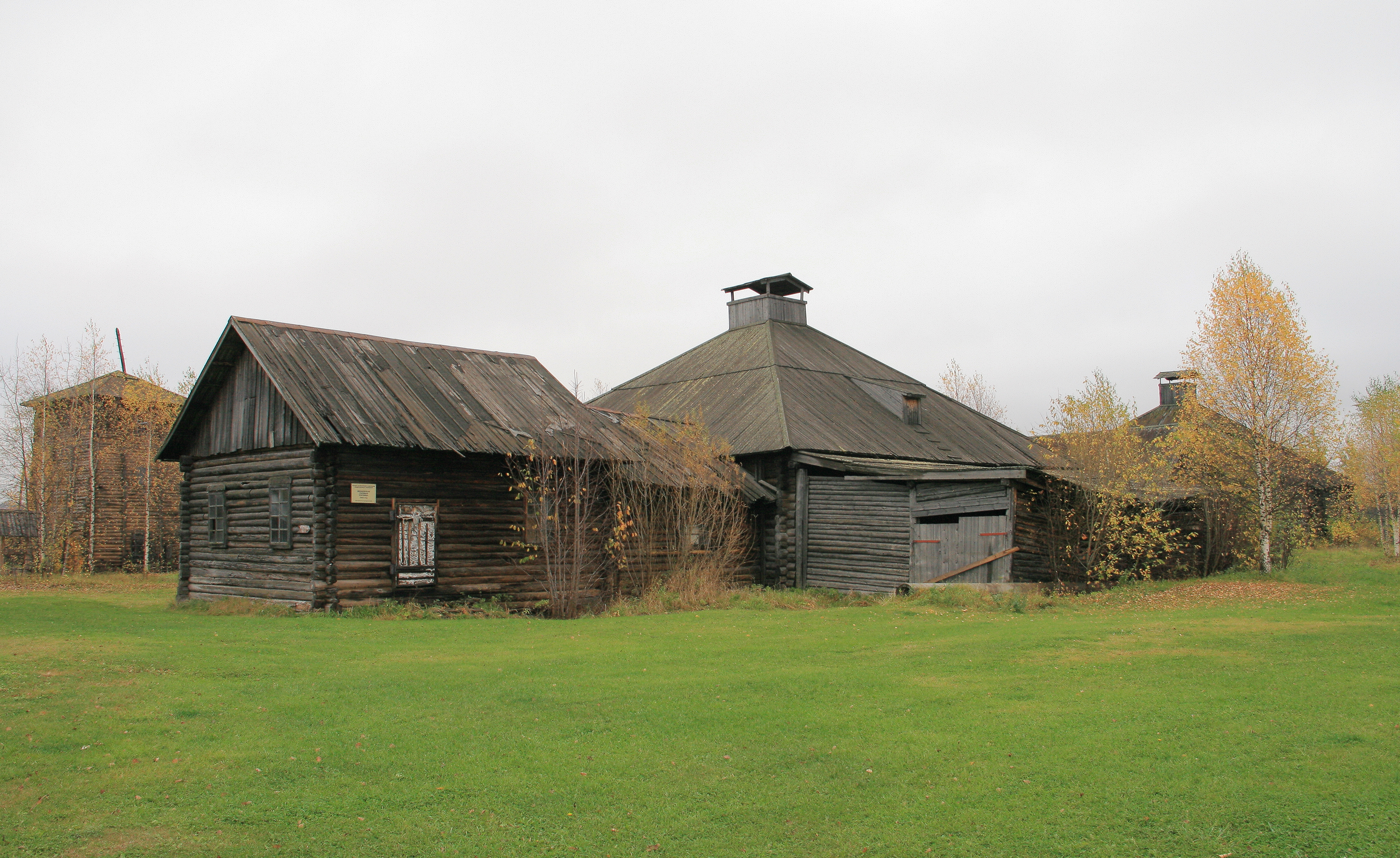
Ivan salt evaporation building

The saltworks preserve the following buildings, each of which is protected separately as a historical monument:

- The direction building (1884)
- Alexander salt tower (1904, Russian: Башня рассолоподъёмная Александровская)
- Resurrection salt tower (1928, Башня рассолоподъёмная Воскресенская)
- Alexander dry salt depot (1882, Амбар соляной Александровский)
- Georgy dry salt depot (end of the 19th century, Амбар соляной Георгиевский)
- Ivan dry salt depot (end of the 19th century, Амбар соляной Ивановский)
- Vasily salt evaporation building (1882, Варница соляная Васильевская)
- Georgy salt evaporation building (1882, Варница соляная Георгиевская)
- Ivan salt evaporation building (1882, Варница соляная Ивановская)
- Alexander salt lar (1882, Ларь соляной Александровский)
- Ivan salt lar (1882, Ларь соляной Ивановский)
- The security building (end of the 19th century)
