= John Coronini =

Father John Coronini (? - 4 August 1925, Harbin, China) - Russian Orthodox (later the Greek-Catholic) priest.

== Biography ==
John Coronini served as an Orthodox priest in the village of Gorodishche, Solikamsky County. After 1917, together with his son was in exile in China. In 1924 his son Constantine died and in 1925 John Coronini also joins to the Catholic Church and the Greek-Catholic community in Harbin, previously headed by his son. Coronini also helped Latin priests Vladislav Ostrovsky and Anthony Lashchevich in pastoral works to Russian Catholics. He died on 4 August 1925.

== Sources ==
Biography of Fr. KI Cronin. - Library of the Pontifical Oriental Institute in Rome.

Vlasov background Waldenberg B. A brief sketch of the Catholic movement in the Far East (1925-1935 gg.) - / / The Catholic Herald. - Harbin, 1935, № 1. - P.5.

Germanovich Joseph, Fr. China, Siberia, Moscow. (Translated from Belarus). - Melbourne, 1997. - P.12-13. Kolpinsky D. Catholicism in the Russian Far East / / Kitezh. - Warsaw, 1931, № 1., P.31.

Vladimir Kolupaev. Fr John and Fr Constantine Coronini - Russian Byzantine Rite Catholic priests / / Siberian Catholic newspaper. - Novosibirsk, 2004, № 10. - P. 10-11.; Continued number 11, p. 15-17, 22.

Konstantin Nikolaev Eastern Rite. - Paris: YMCA, 1950. - P. 211. Biographical information provided by Vladimir Kolupaev.
