= Vilva, Solikamsky District, Perm Krai =

Vilva Вильва
- Village
- Location within Perm Krai Location within Russia
- Coordinates: 59°46′N 56°28′E
- Country: Russia
- Region: Perm Krai
- District: Solikamsky District
- Time zone: UTC+5:00

Vilva (Russian: Вильва) is a rural locality (a village) in Solikamsky District, Perm Krai, Russia. The population was 469 as of 2010. There are 15 streets.

== Geography ==
Vilva is located 38 km northwest of Solikamsk (the district's administrative centre) by road. Pukhireva is the nearest rural locality.
