= Gorodishche, Solikamsky District, Perm Krai =

Gorodishche Городище
- Selo
- Location within Perm Krai Location within Russia
- Coordinates: 59°40′N 56°51′E
- Country: Russia
- Region: Perm Krai
- District: Solikamsky District
- Time zone: UTC+5:00

Gorodishche (Russian: Городище) is a rural locality (a selo) in Solikamsky District, Perm Krai, Russia. The population was 898 as of 2010. There are 18 streets.

== Geography ==
Gorodishche is located 8 km northeast of Solikamsk (the district's administrative centre) by road. Maloye Gorodishche is the nearest rural locality.
