= Solikamsky District =

Solikamsky District Соликамский район (Russian)
- District
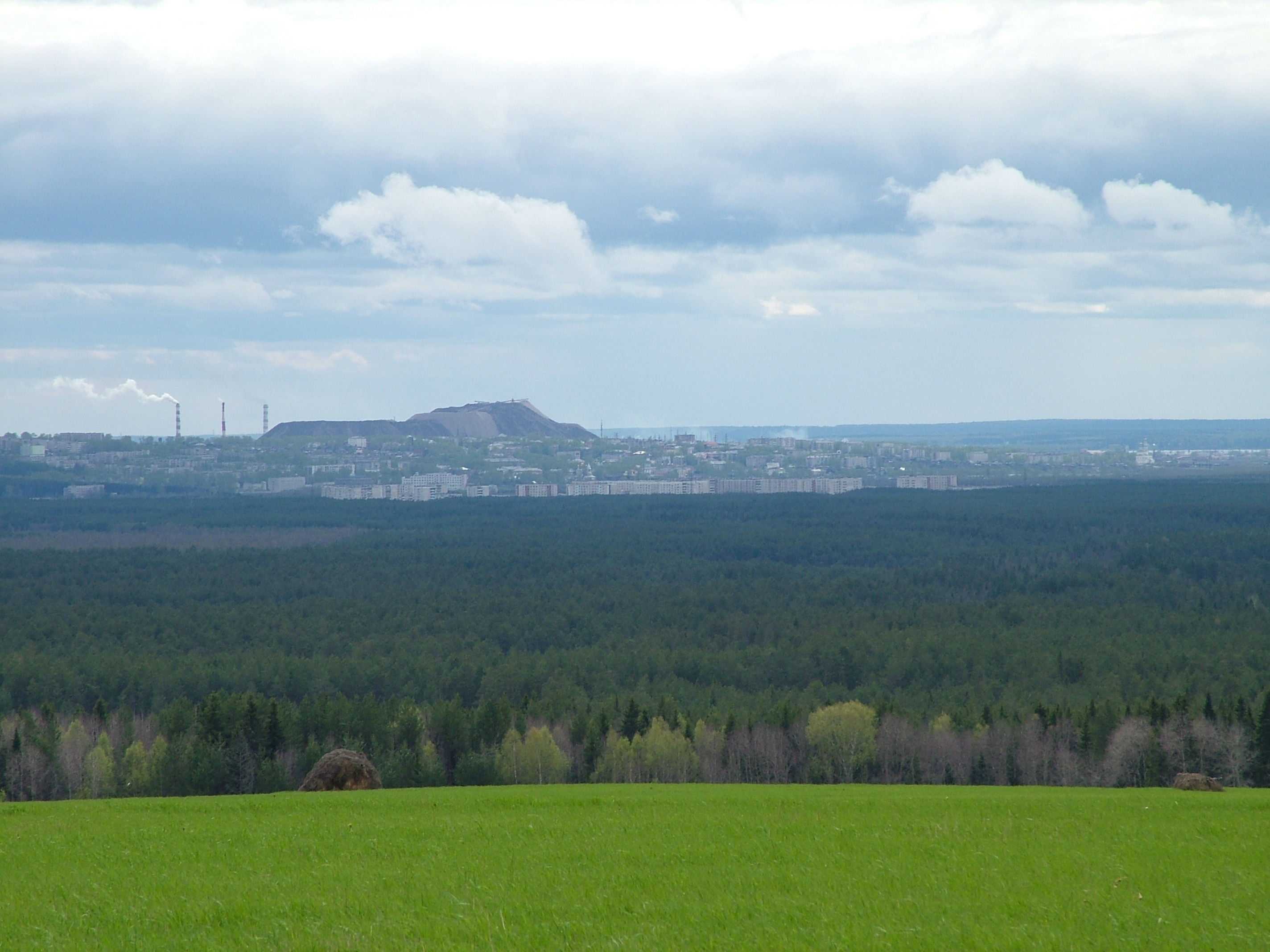
- View of Solikamsk from the north

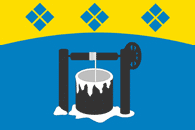
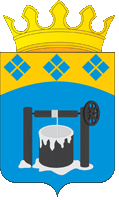
- Flag Coat of arms
- Location of Solikamsky District in Perm Krai
- Coordinates: 59.782°N 56.601°E
- Country: Russia
- Federal subject: Perm Krai
- Established: 1924 (first); 1938 (second)
- Administrative center: Solikamsk

Area
  - Total: 5,421 km^{2} (2,093 sq mi)

Population (2010 Census)
  - Total: 17,165
  - Density: 3.166/km^{2} (8.201/sq mi)
  - Urban: 0%
  - Rural: 100%

Administrative structure
  - Inhabited localities: 58 rural localities

Municipal structure
  - Municipally incorporated as: Solikamsky Municipal District
  - Municipal divisions: 0 urban settlements, 7 rural settlements
- Time zone: UTC+5 (MSK+2)
- OKTMO ID: 57650000
- Website: http://solikamsk-raion.ru

Solikamsky District (Russian: Солика́мский райо́н) is an administrative district (raion), one of the thirty-three in Perm Krai, Russia. Within the framework of municipal divisions, it is incorporated as Solikamsky Municipal District. It is located in the northern central part of the krai. The area of the district is 5,421 square kilometers (2,093 sq mi). Its administrative center is the town of Solikamsk (which is not administratively a part of the district). Population: 17,165 (2010 census); 18,333 (2002 census); 19,450 (1989 Soviet census).

== Geography ==
About 80% of the district's territory is covered by forests, mostly coniferous.

== History ==
The district was established in 1924, but was abolished between 1930 and 1938. In October 1938, it became a part of Perm Oblast.

== Administrative and municipal status ==
Within the framework of administrative divisions, Solikamsky District is one of the thirty-three in the krai. The town of Solikamsk serves as its administrative center, despite being incorporated separately as a town of krai significance—an administrative unit with the status equal to that of the districts.

As a municipal division, the district is incorporated as Solikamsky Municipal District. The town of krai significance of Solikamsk is incorporated separately from the district as Solikamsk Urban Okrug.

== Demographics ==
Ethnic composition (as of the 2002 Census):

- Russians: 89.8%
- Komi peoples: 1.8%
- Ukrainians: 1.6%

== Economy ==
The economy of the district is based on agriculture and forestry.

== Notable residents ==
- Constantine Coronini (1881-1924), priest, born in the village of Gorodishche
- Aleksandr Kisakov (born 2002), ice hockey player, born in Solikamsk
- Pelageya Shajn (1894–1956), astronomer, born in the village of Ostanin

== See also ==
- Vilva
