= Solikamsk =

Town in Perm Krai, Russia

Solikamsk Соликамск
- Town
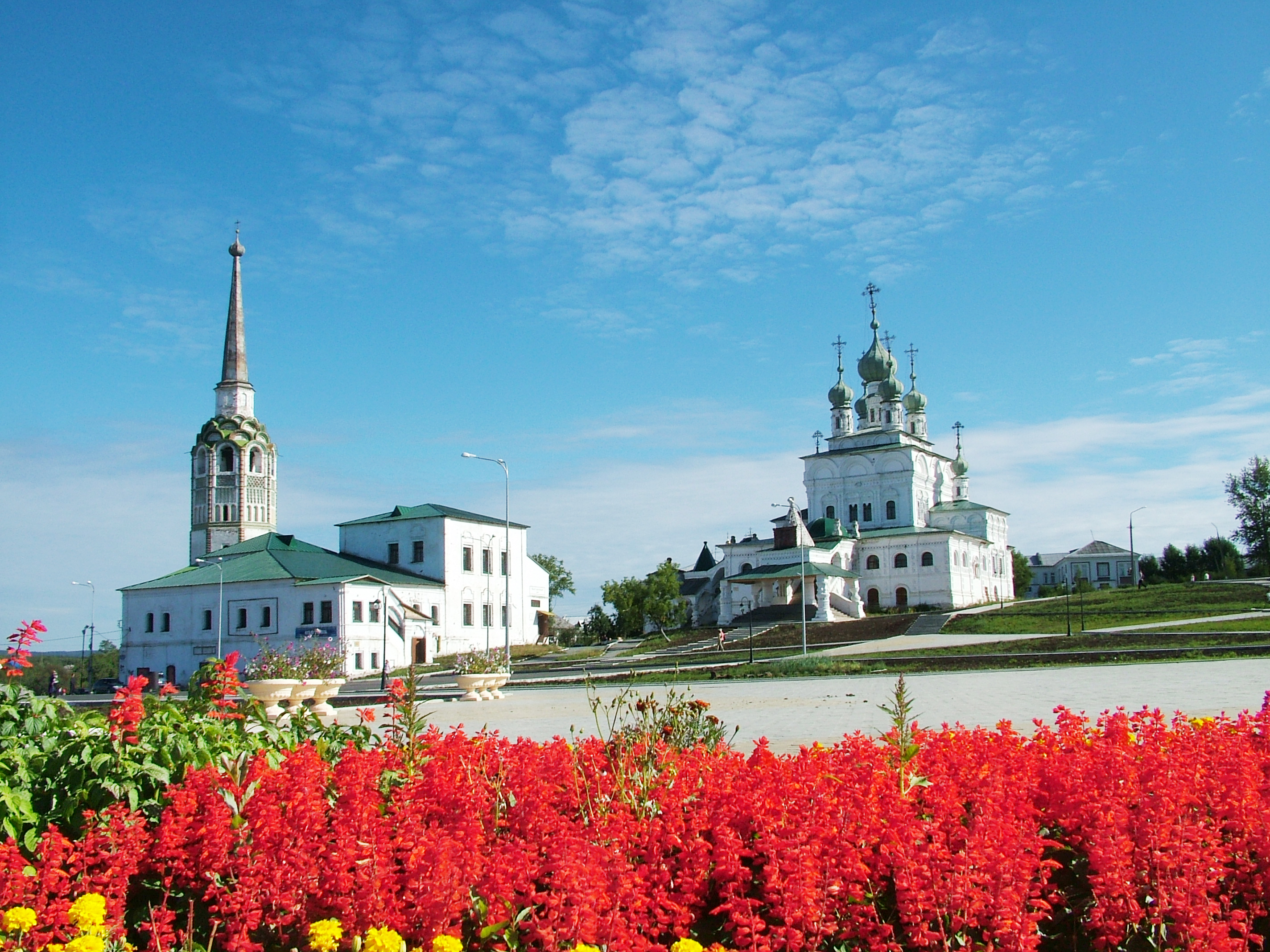
- Central square in Solikamsk

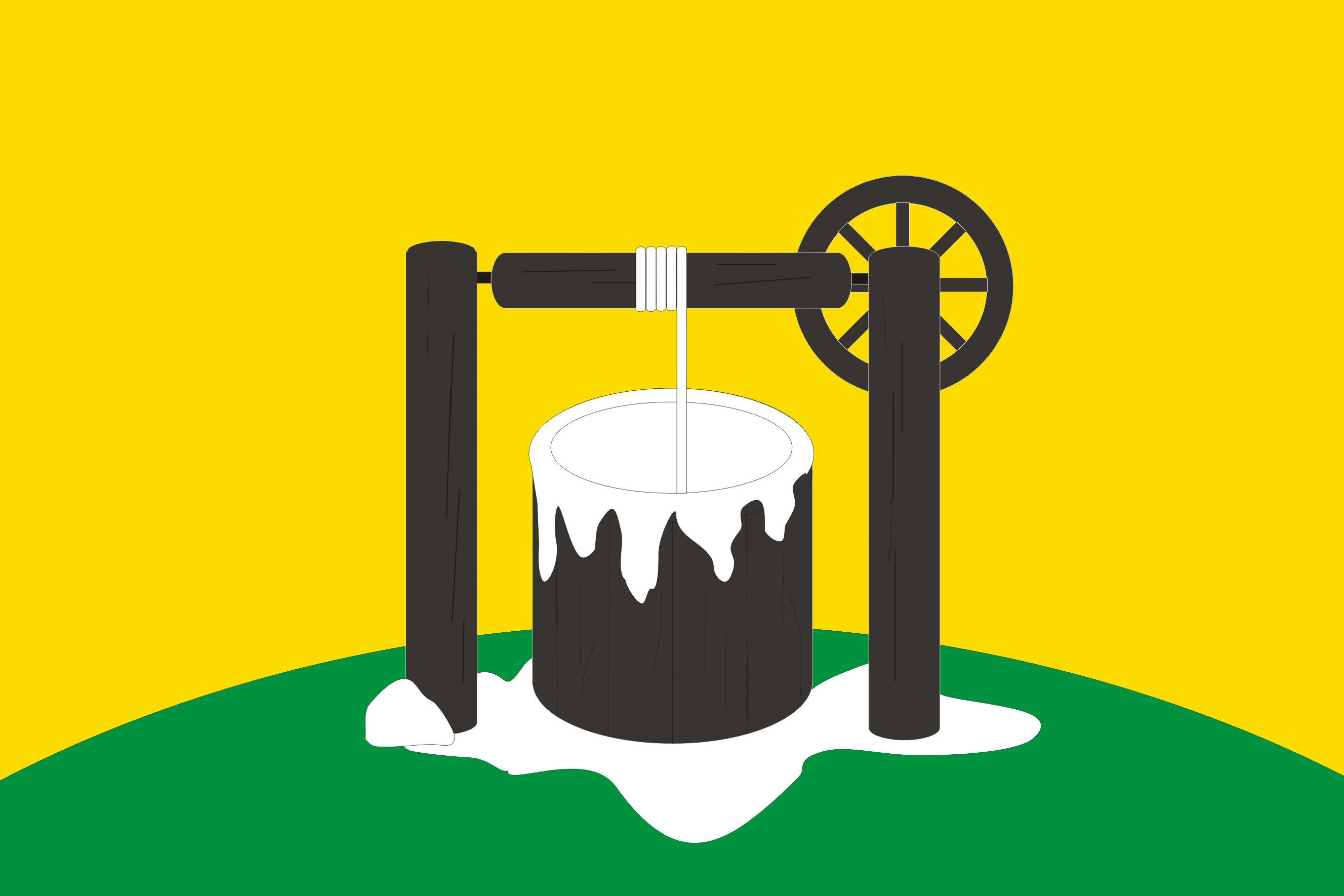
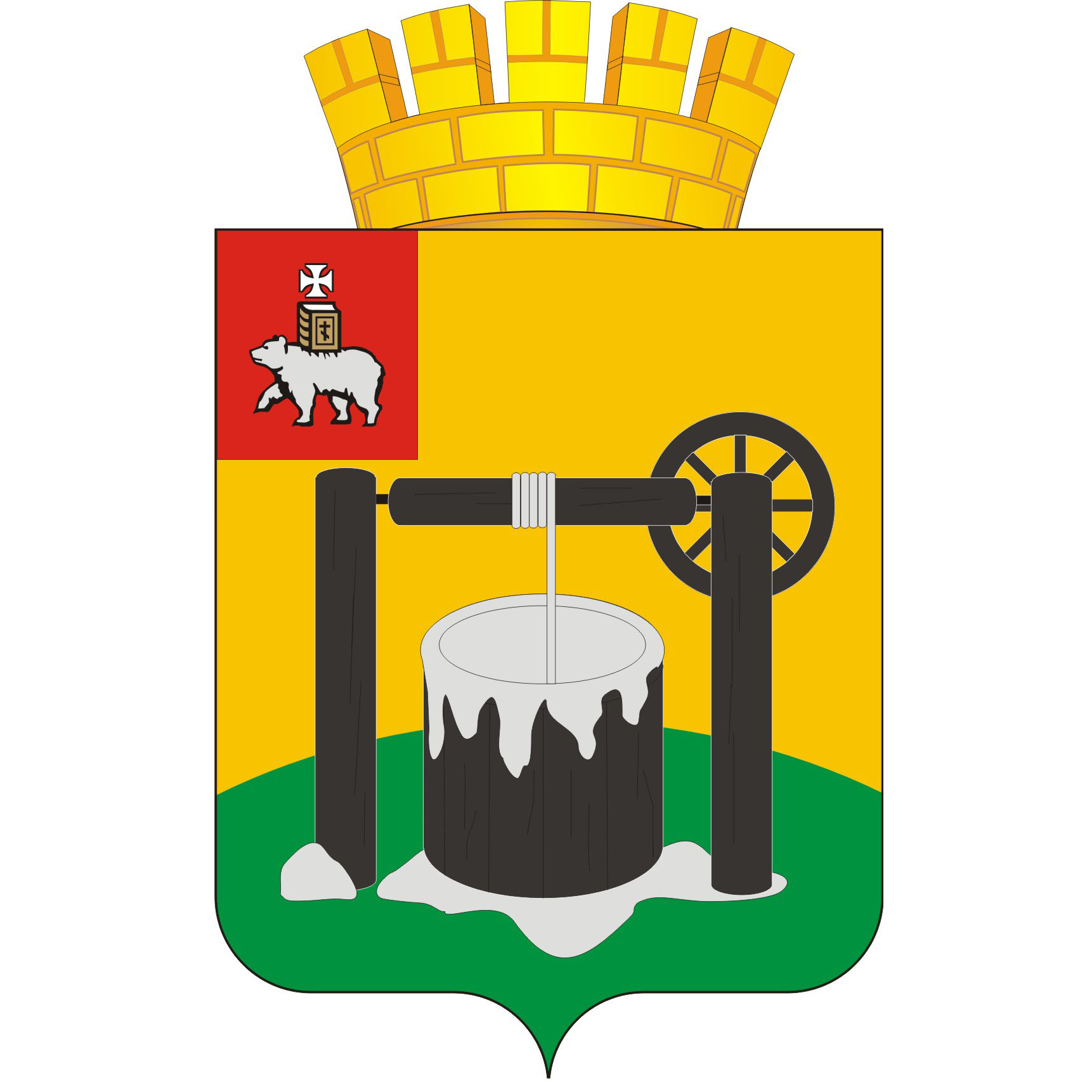
- Flag Coat of arms
- Interactive map of Solikamsk
- Location of Solikamsk Solikamsk (Perm Krai)
- Coordinates: 59°38′36″N 56°45′00″E
- Country: Russia
- Federal subject: Perm Krai
- Founded: 1430
- Elevation: 150 m (490 ft)

Population (2010 Census)
  - Total: 97,384
  - Estimate (2025): 87,745 (−9.9%)
  - Rank: 174th in 2010

Administrative status
  - Subordinated to: town of krai significance of Solikamsk
  - Capital of: Solikamsky District, town of krai significance of Solikamsk

Municipal status
  - Urban okrug: Solikamsk Urban Okrug
  - Capital of: Solikamsk Urban Okrug, Solikamsky Municipal District
- Time zone: UTC+5 (MSK+2)
- Postal code: 618540–618556
- OKTMO ID: 57730000001

Solikamsk (Note: Russian: Солика́мск, Komi-Permyak: Совкар, romanized: Sovkar, also Соликамскӧй, Sovkamsköy) is a town in Perm Krai, Russia. Modern Solikamsk is the third-largest town in the krai, with a population of 97,384 (2010 census); 102,531 (2002 census); 110,098 (1989 Soviet census).

== History ==
The earliest surviving recorded mention of Solikamsk, initially as "Usolye-na-Kamskom" (Усолье на Камском) dates from 1430, in connection with the discovery and exploitation by miners and merchants, probably from Vologda, of massive salt deposits on the banks of the Usolka River. The name of the town is derived from the Russian words "соль" (sol, meaning "salt") and "Кама" (Kama River, flowing through the town).

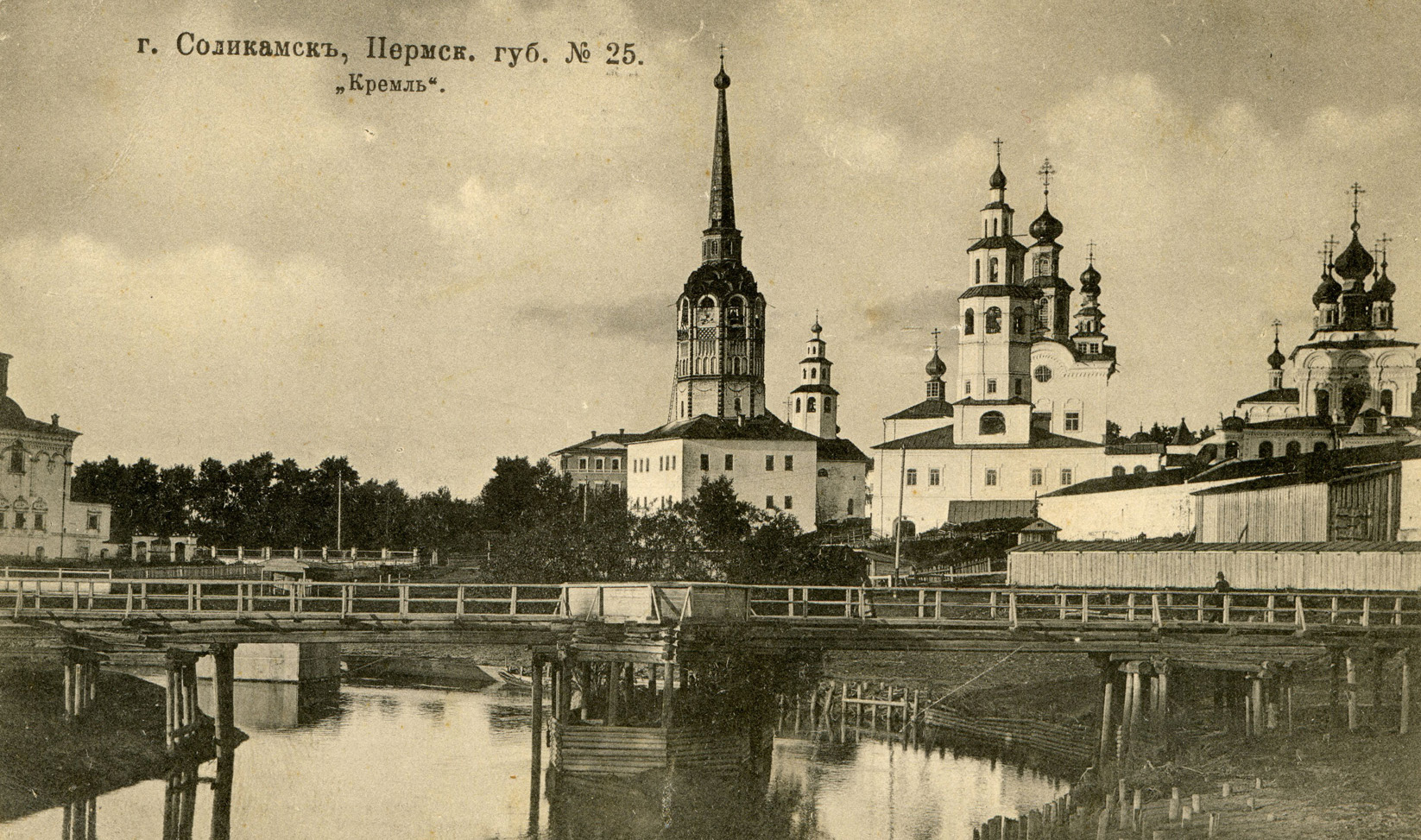
Old postcard of Solikamsk

The rapid growth of Solikamsk in the 17th century was predicated on the establishment of the Babinov Road, which was the only overland route leading from European Russia to Siberia. This road started in Solikamsk. The Stroganov family operated the country's largest salt-mining facilities in Solikamsk and the surrounding area. The local saltworks were described in detail by Johann Georg Gmelin. In the mid-17th century Solikamsk also became the first centre of copper casting in Russia. Some Polish insurgents of the January Uprising were exiled in Solikamsk in the 1860s.

After the establishment of iron works in Yekaterinburg and Perm and the construction of a southern highway to Siberia the importance and prosperity of Solikamsk gradually declined. Until 1923, the town was the administrative center of Solikamsky Uyezd in Perm Governorate.

The town's Svyato-Troitskoe monastery was closed by the Bolsheviks in 1918. After 1938 its buildings housed the transit prison of Usollag, a camp complex in the area run by the NKVD. Many were shot and buried in the monastery grounds; in 2012 a wooden commemorative cross was raised there.

In November 2014 a sinkhole opened near Solikamsk because of a mining problem.

=== Coat of arms ===
Coat of arms was granted to Solikamsk on July 17, 1783. The arms show in the upper half the arms of Perm Governorate. The lower half shows a salt well, due to Solikamsk being the largest producer of salt and magnesium in Russia at the time.

== Cultural heritage ==
Cultural heritage monuments in Solikamsk include a slew of old churches and several civic buildings of importance, including:

- The governor's residence (1673–1688), the oldest surviving house in the Urals.
- A two-storey wooden house dating from the early 18th century.
- Turchaninov's residence from the 1760s and 1780s.

The most important religious buildings are the following:

- The Trinity Cathedral (1683–97) with five domes, three far-flung porches (of which two survive), the annex of John the Baptist (consecrated 1689) and the annex of Saint Nicholas (consecrated in 1693). Some architectural elements have no parallel anywhere in Russia.
- The octagonal Bell Tower was built in 1713. It also has no parallel in Russian architecture.
- The five-domed Church of the Lord's Epiphany (1688–95) contains a choice selection of icons from a local art museum. The tent-like belfry was rebuilt in the 1940s.
- The Church of St. John the Baptist (1721–28) with a tall belfry and a huge refectory.
- The Cathedral of the Cross (1698–1709) was rebuilt by the Soviets into a brewery. It was only in 2009 that the church's dome was restored. The palmette decoration of the walls is the earliest of its kind in Russia.
- The 5-domed Church of the Mandylion (1689–91) is situated in the former kremlin. Its altar contains another altar, which is very rare. The smaller 1-domed church of Michael the Archangel (1712–25) was intended for winter services.
- The Monastery of the Holy Trinity contains the 1-domed katholikon (built in 1698–1704) and the belfry-church of the Lord's Ascension (built in 1731–1734, mainly using funds provided by the Turchaninov industrialist family).
- The Convent of the Saviour's Transfiguration contains the 5-domed katholikon (built in 1683–92) with a tent-like belfry and a tiny church of Mary's Presentation at the Temple (consecrated in 1713).
- The large and complex Church of the Nativity and the Resurrection was built from 1714 onward. Its domes and belfry were removed by the Bolsheviks.

Other local sights include an old salt pit (in use since 1906) and the Salt Museum which occupies the buildings of the Ust-Borovaya Saltworks established in 1878.

The oldest brick building in the Urals, the Church of the Cross's Exultation (1678), is located in the former village of Verkh-Borovaya, 20 kilometers (12 mi) north of Solikamsk.

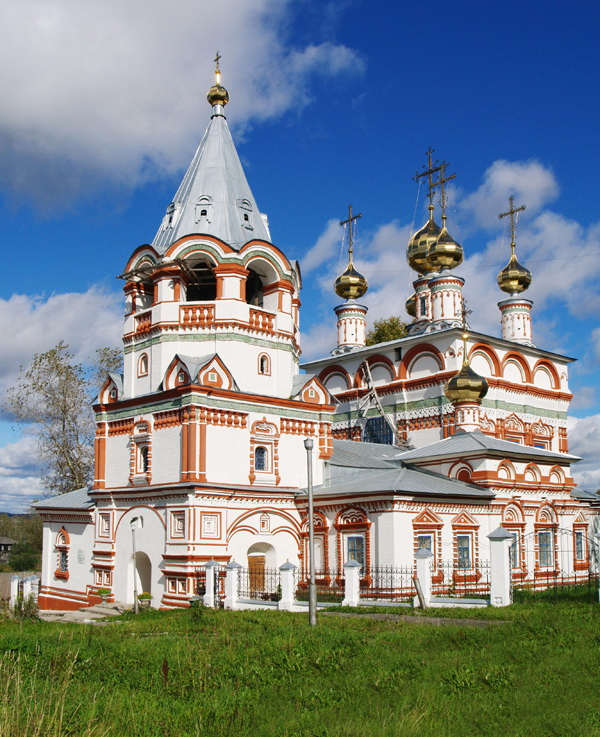
The Epiphany Church, 1688–95

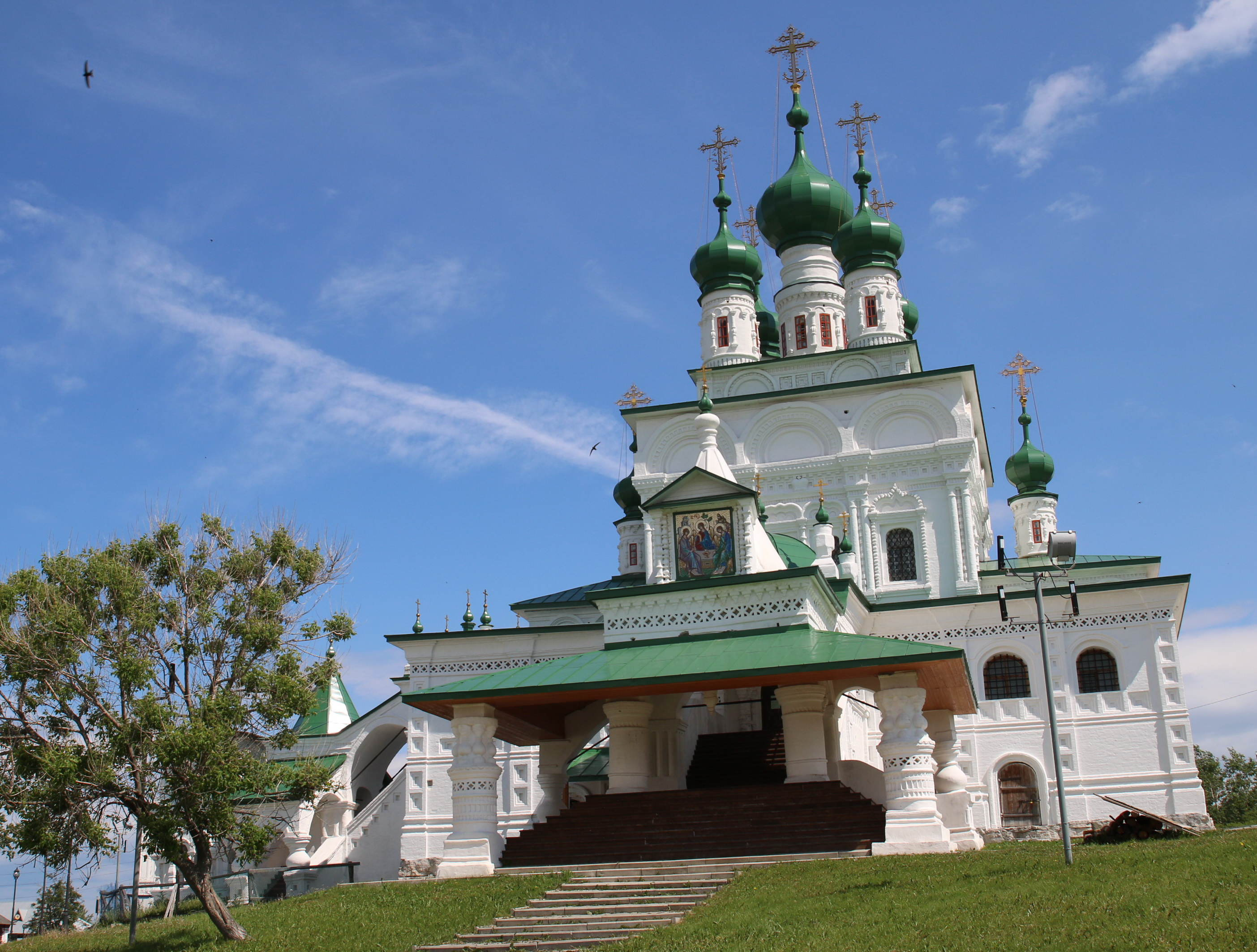
The Trinity Cathedral, 1683–97

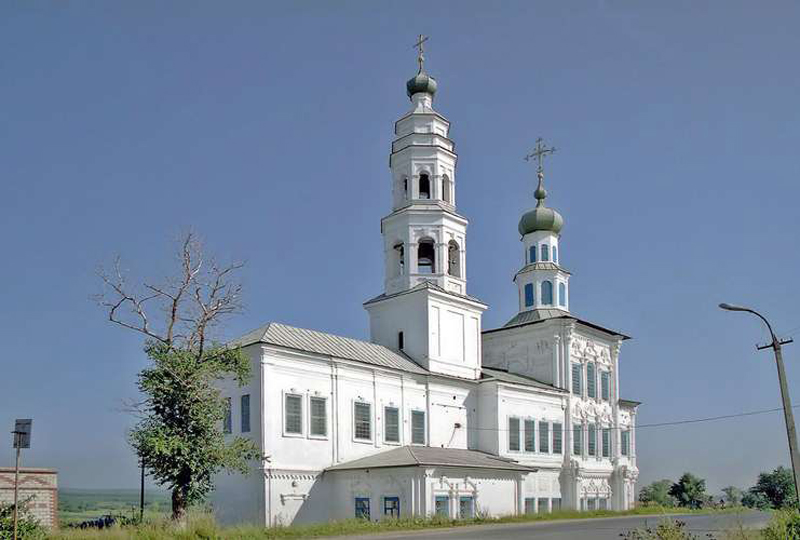
The Church of John the Baptist, 1721–28

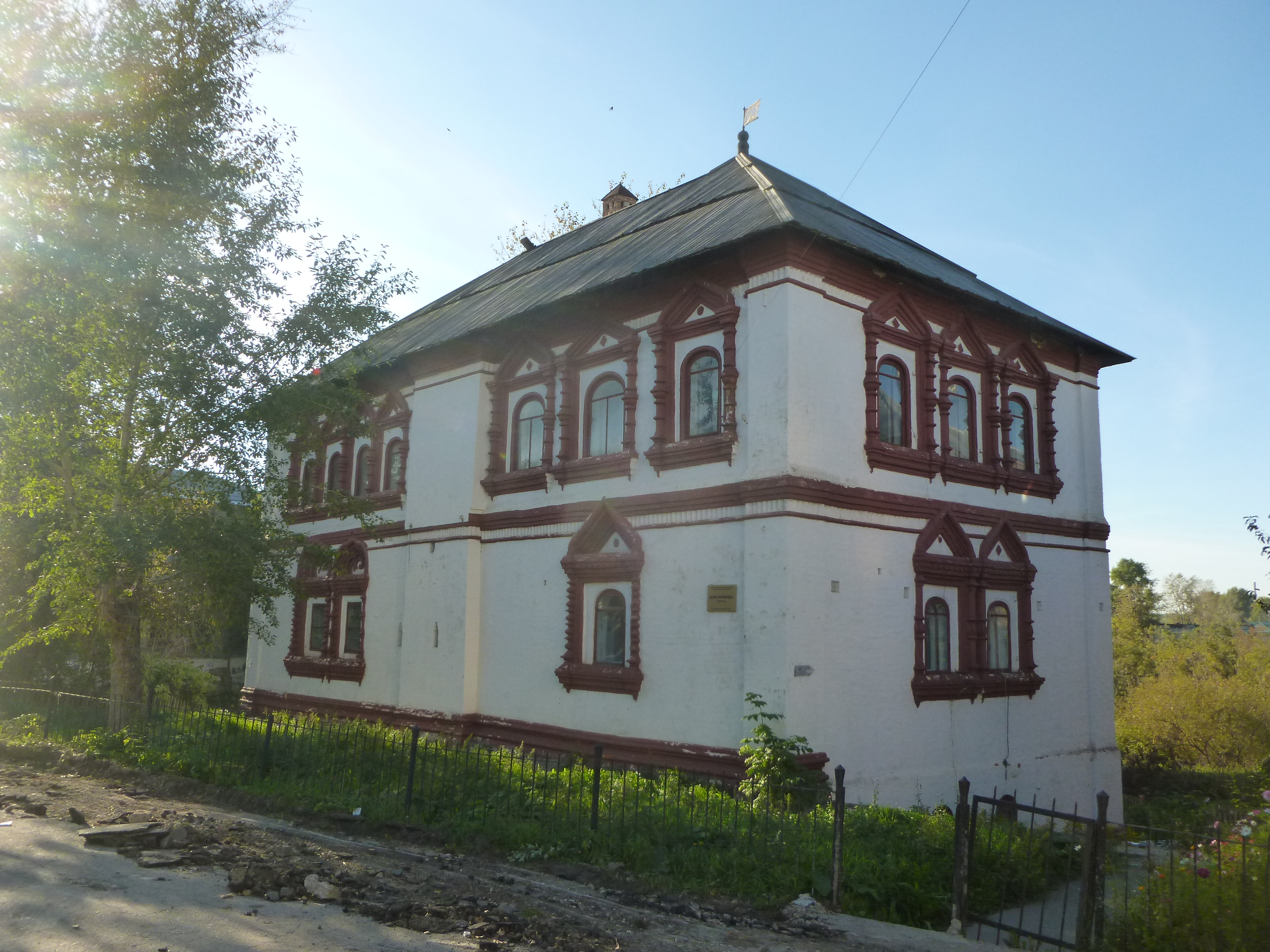
The governor's residence, 1673–88

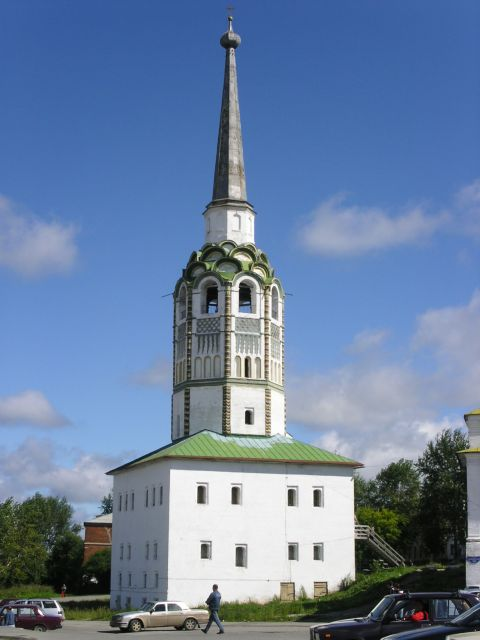
The main city bell tower, 1713

== Education ==
Solikamsk is the home of Solikamsky State Teachers' Training Institute (branch of Perm State University).

== Administrative and municipal status ==
Within the framework of administrative divisions, Solikamsk serves as the administrative center of Solikamsky District, even though it is not a part of it. As an administrative division, it is incorporated separately as the town of krai significance of Solikamsk—an administrative unit with the status equal to that of the districts. As a municipal division, the town of krai significance of Solikamsk is incorporated as Solikamsk Urban Okrug.

== Salt production ==
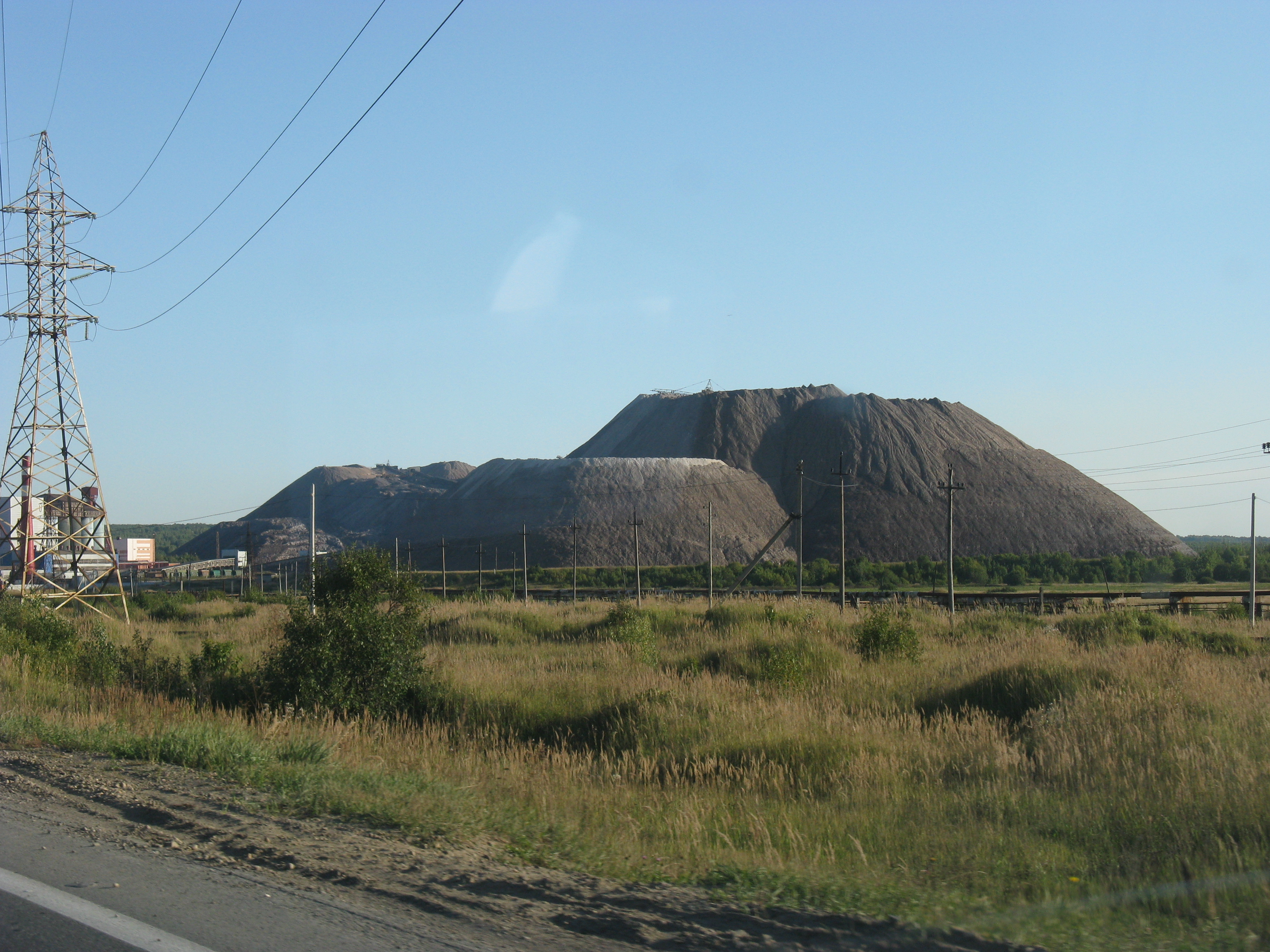
Spoil tips in Solikamsk

The town is famous for its production of salt; in particular, potassium chloride, which is used as a fertilizer. More than 11,000 people work in salt mining, 3,000 underground, and 7,000 above ground. It is also close to a labor camp from the Soviet times, which is now used as a museum. There is also a museum dedicated to explaining all stages of salt mining and refining.
